= List of privateers =

A privateer was a private person authorized by a country's government by letters of marque to attack foreign shipping. Privateering was an accepted part of naval warfare from the 16th to the 19th centuries, authorised by all significant naval powers.

== Notable privateers ==
- Wetheman (active 1151/52 – c.1170), Danish, Wendish Crusade
- Victual Brothers or Vitalians or Likedeelers 1360–1401
- Gödeke Michels (leader of the Likedeelers) 1360–1401
- Klaus Störtebeker, Wismar, (leader of the Likedeelers), 1360–1401
- Didrik Pining, German, c. 1428–1491
- Paul Beneke, German, born in Hanseatic City of Danzig, Pomerelia c. 1440s–1490s
- Kemal Reis, Turkish, c. 1451–1511
- Oruç Reis (Barbarossa), Turkish, c. 1474–1518
- Barbarossa Hayreddin Pasha, Turkish, 1478–1546
- Turgut Reis (Dragut), Turkish, c. 1485–1565
- Timoji, Hindu, 1496–1513
- Murat Reis the Older, Turkish, c. 1506–1609
- Sir Francis Drake, English, c. 1540–1596
- Sir George Somers, English 1554–1610
- Captain Christopher Newport, English, c. 1561–1617
- Magnus Heinason, Faroese, c. 1568–1578 privateer in Dutch service under the Dutch revolt and 1580s, and privateer and merchant in Danish service on the Faroe Islands c. 1578–1589
- Piet Hein, Dutch, 1577–1629
- Alonso de Contreras, Spanish, 1582–1641, privateer against the Turks under the banner of the Order of Malta and later commanded Spanish ships
- James Erisey, English, 1585–1590s
- Peter Easton, England/Newfoundland, c. 1611–1614
- Sir Henry Morgan, Welsh, 1635–1688
- Jean Bart, French, 1651–1702
- William Dampier, English, 1652–1715
- William Kidd, Scottish, c. 1654–1701
- Nicolas Baeteman, Dunkirker 1659–1720
- Alexander Dalzeel, Scotland, c. 1662–1715
- René Duguay-Trouin, French, 1673–1736
- Kanhoji Angre, Maratha, 1698–1729
- Lars Gathenhielm, Swedish, 1710–1718
- Ingela Gathenhielm, Swedish, 1710/18–1721
- Fortunatus Wright, English of Liverpool, 1712–1757
- David Hawley, colonial United States, 1741–1807
- Jonathan Haraden, colonial United States, 1744–1803
- William Death, English, 1756
- Alexander Godfrey, colonial Nova Scotia, 1756–1803
- Jose Campuzano-Polanco, colonial Santo Domingo, 1689-1760
- Etienne Pellot, aka "the Basque Fox", French, 1765–1856
- Noah Stoddard, United States, 1755-1850
- Robert Surcouf, French, 1773–1827
- John Goodrich (1722-1785), Loyalist privateer in the American Revolution
- David McCullough, colonial United States, 1777-1778
- Jean Gaspard Vence, French, –1783
- Joseph Barss, Colonial Nova Scotia, 1776–1824
- Jean Lafitte 1776–1854, French Louisiana hero in the Gulf of Mexico
- John Ordronaux (privateer), United States, 1778–1841
- Ephraim Sturdivant, United States, 1782–1868
- Hipólito Bouchard, Argentina, 1783–1843
- Otway Burns, North Carolina, United States 1775–1850
