= 12 Paces Without a Head =

2009 film

- German theatrical release poster
- Directed by: Sven Taddicken
- Written by: Matthias Pacht
- Produced by: Stefan Schubert; Björn Vosgerau; Ralph Schwingel; Uwe Kolbe
- Starring: Ronald Zehrfeld; Matthias Schweighöfer
- Cinematography: Daniela Knapp
- Edited by: Andreas Wodraschke; Alexander Dittner; Florian Miosge
- Music by: Christoph Blaser; Steffen Kahles
- Production companies: Wüste Film; Warner Bros. Film Productions Germany; Magnolia Filmproduktion
- Distributed by: Warner Bros. Pictures
- Release dates: 11 July 2009 (Munich Film Festival); 10 December 2009 (Germany)
- Running time: 103 minutes
- Country: Germany
- Language: German

12 Paces Without a Head (German: Zwölf Meter ohne Kopf) is a 2009 film directed by Sven Taddicken. Set in the North Sea in 1401, the film centers on the German folk hero Klaus Störtebeker, who was a pirate at the time. The title comes from a legend which asserts that when he was captured by the Hanseatic League, he struck a deal with his captors that every one of his men whom he could walk past after being decapitated, would be let go. Störtebeker's body allegedly managed to make twelve paces before collapsing.

== Cast ==
- Ronald Zehrfeld as Klaus Störtebeker
- Matthias Schweighöfer as Gottfried Michaelsen
- Oliver Bröcker as Lupe
- Hinnerk Schönemann as Keule
- Jacob Matschenz as Nolle
- Franziska Wulf as Bille
- Jana Pallaske as Okka
- Devid Striesow as Simon of Utrecht
- Alexander Scheer as Herman Lange
- Milan Peschel as Nicolaus Schocke
- Detlev Buck as arms dealer
- Peter Kurth as Keno tom Brok
- Matthias Klimsa as innkeeper
- Simon Gosejohann as Fokko Johannson
- Ferris MC as Beule
- Achim Reichel as hangman
- Kåre Johannessen as lord (credited as "Kore Johannessen")

== See also ==
- List of historical drama films
