= Dessauer Ufer =

Subcamp of the Neuengamme concentration camp in Nazi Germany (1944–1945)

Coordinates: 53°31′35″N 10°0′42″E

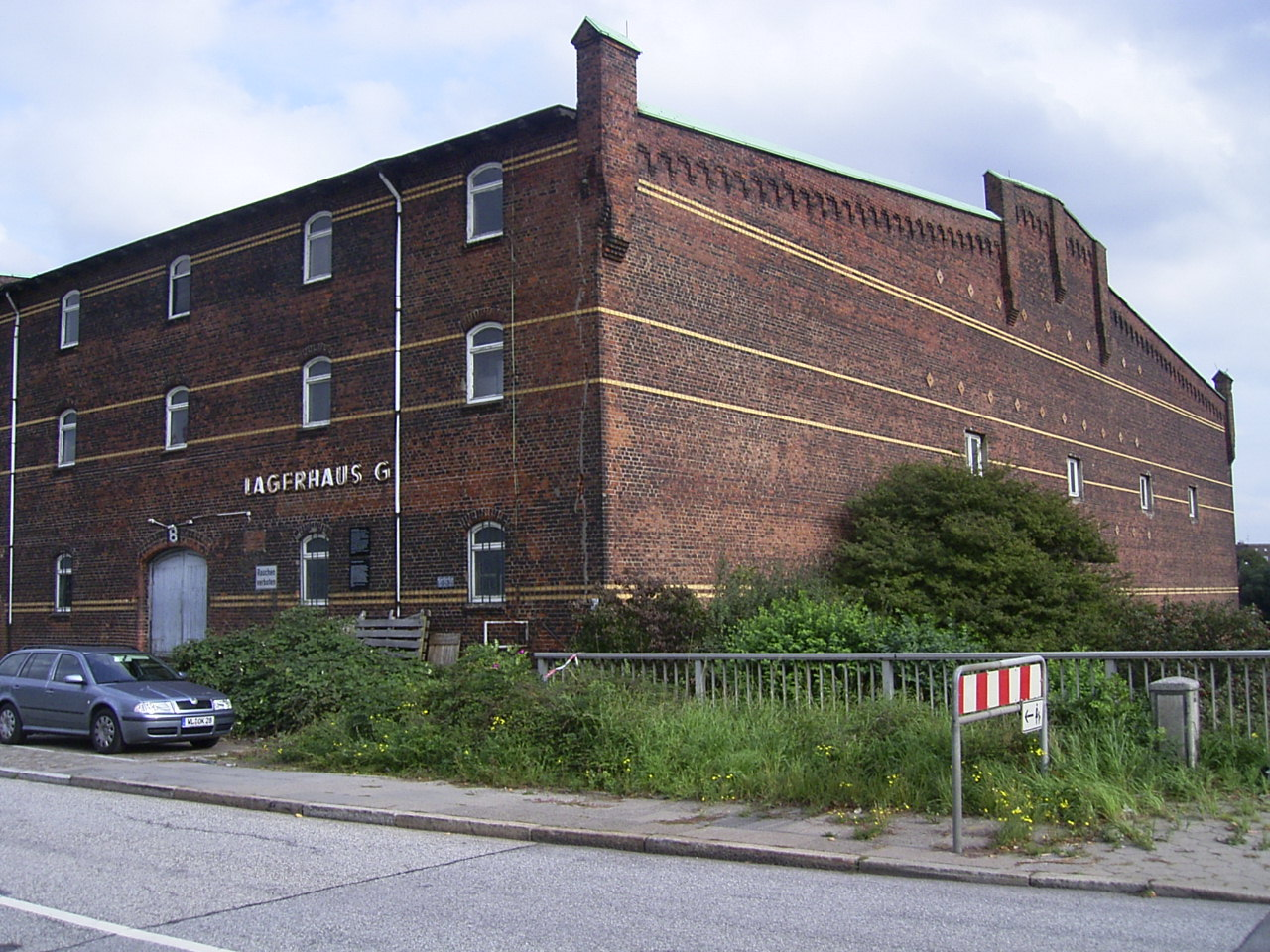
Lagerhaus G

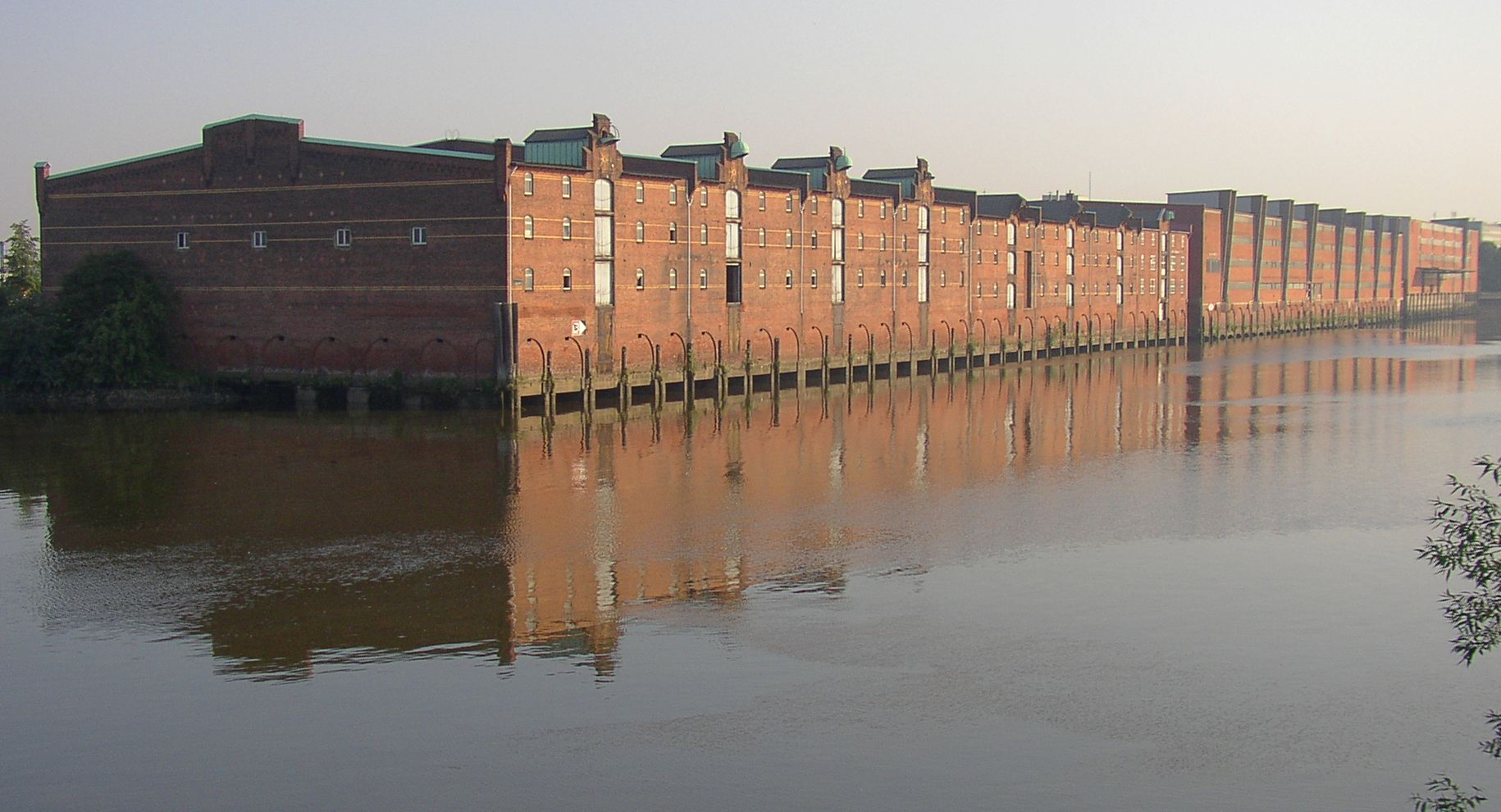
Lagerhaus G from the water side (Saalehafen)

Dessauer Ufer was a subcamp of the Neuengamme concentration camp in Nazi Germany, located inside the Port of Hamburg on the Kleiner Grasbrook in Veddel. It was in operation from July 1944 to April 1945. Inmates were mostly used for forced labour at rubble clearing and building in the Hamburg port area.

== Location ==
The subcamp was located in a warehouse (Lagerhaus G) in Hamburg Veddel on the Dessauer Ufer or Dessauer Strasse (at the Kleiner Grasbrook). It was built in 1903.

== Operation ==
The camp was the first subcamp for women in the Neuengamme system, opened in mid-July 1944 for 1,000 Czechs and Hungarian Jewish women selected from Auschwitz-Birkenau. Around one month later, they were joined by 500 more Polish-Jewish from the Łódź ghetto, previously also at Birkenau. The women were employed under the Geilenbergprogramm to restore the production of the German petroleum industry. They were forced to do rubble clearing/rebuilding work at refineries like Rhenania Ossag (Shell), Ebano-Oehler (Esso), J. Schindler, Jung-Öl and other port facilities, such as Blohm + Voss. On 13 September 1944, the women were transported to the Hamburg-Sasel, Wedel and Hamburg-Neugraben camps.

Two days later, 2,000 male prisoners were transported to Veddel from the central Neuengamme camp. They too were used to do rubble clearing and construction work under the Geilenbergprogramm, at water works, breweries, in the petroleum industry and at the Reichsbahn. One work gang had to dig anti-tank ditches at Hittfeld. The men were guarded by customs officers seconded to the SS.

In a 25 October 1944 air raid, the camp was largely destroyed at the reported loss of 150 prisoners' lives. The survivors were transported to the Fuhlsbüttel subcamp, but they continued to work at the same sites as before.

On 15 February 1945, 800 male prisoners were transported back from Fuhlsbüttel to the camp to produce petrol for Jung-Öl at Wilhelmsburg. On 14 April 1945, the SS permanently evacuated the camp, transporting the inmates to the Stalag X-B camp at Sandbostel.

== Memorial ==
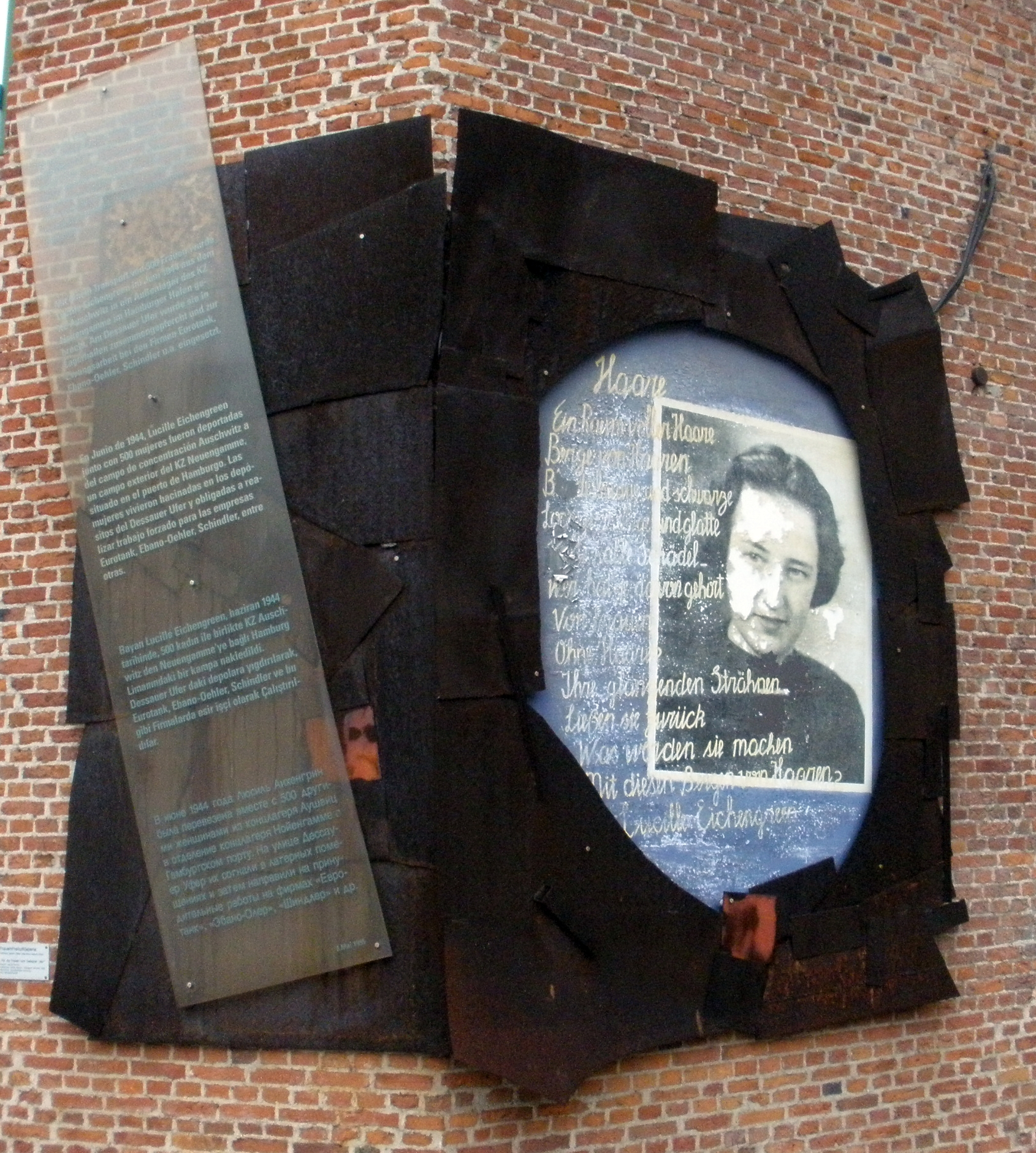
The Mural for the women from Dessauer Ufer

The warehouse in which the camp was located has been under historic preservation since 1998 because it represents a "historic type of warehouses outside the Speicherstadt featuring the brick architecture typical at the time". Moreover, the building has not changed much since 1945 and traces of the inmates' presence are still visible inside, making the warehouse "an important witness" of Nazi period activities in the port.

At the building today there are two memorial plaques for the inmates (one in German, one in English). The building itself is not open to the public. A mural commemorating the women imprisoned at the subcamp is located in another part of the city. The Mural from 1995 is part of Hamburg’s FrauenFreiluftGalerie (Women’s Open-air Gallery) and depicts the Holocaust survivor Lucille Eichengreen, who was imprisoned in the subcamp.
