= Eichengreen =

Eichengreen is a surname. Notable people with the surname include:

- Barry Eichengreen (born 1952), American economist and economic historian
- Lucille Eichengreen (1925–2020), Nazi concentration camp survivor and author
