= Magister Wigbold =

German pirate (died 1401)

Magister Wigbold (died 1401), (alternative spellings: Wygbold, Wycholt), also called “Master of the Seven Arts” was a German pirate who belonged to the famous Likedeeler pirates of Klaus Störtebeker who were active in the North and Baltic seas. Wigbold was one of the most noted Likedeeler, along with Gödeke Michels and Störtebeker. The nickname Wigbold comes from wig (strife) and bold (courageous, bold). Whether Wigbold was a nickname, or possibly his real name, is unknown.

== Life ==
Nothing is known about Wigbold's early life. Contemporary chronicles call him a Master of the Seven Arts. According to the historian Ludwig Bühnau, he may have attended university at Oxford. His name or variants of it are however not listed in A.B. Emden's Biographical Register of the University of Oxford to A.D.1500. It is possible that he studied under a different name, or that records of his time at Oxford have been lost.

Wigbold is first mentioned as one of those pirates who left the Baltic Sea in 1395 for the North Sea. Matthias Puhle calls him a Likedeeler captain of the second generation, no longer members of the Mecklenburg aristocracy. They operated from East Frisia, where the local chieftains supported them. In 1400, the Hanseatic League sent a sizable military force to smash the group. Michels and Wigbold escaped at first, and probably spent a winter in Norway, before returning to East Frisia, where they were finally captured. One year after the death of Störtebeker, they too were executed on the Grasbrook in Hamburg together with eighty other pirates.

== Literature ==
=== Non-fiction ===
- Matthias Blazek: Seeräuberei, Mord und Sühne – Eine 700-jährige Geschichte der Todesstrafe in Hamburg 1292–1949. ibidem, Stuttgart 2012, ISBN 978-3-8382-0457-4.
- Ortwin Pelc: Seeräuber auf Nord- und Ostsee: Wirklichkeit und Mythos. Boyens, Heide, 2005, ISBN 3804211704.
- Matthias Puhle: Die Vitalienbrüder: Klaus Störtebeker und die Seeräuber der Hansezeit. Campus Verlag, Frankfurt, 2012, ISBN 9783593398013.

=== Fiction ===
- Thomas Einfeldt: Störtebekers Kinder. Ravensburger Buchverlag, Ravensburg 2002, ISBN 3-473-58200-X.
- Gustav Schalk: Klaus Störtebeker. Ueberreuter, Wien 2002, ISBN 3-8000-2876-X.
