= Battle of Bergen =

Battle of Bergen may refer to:

- Sacking of Bergen (1393); first Victual Brothers sack of Bergen
- Battle of Bergen (1677) in which the Danes invaded the Swedish-held island of Rügen
- Battle of Bergen (1759)
- Battle of Bergen (1799)
- Battle of Mons (1914), called Bergen in Flemish
