= Wilhelmsburg, Hamburg =

Wilhelmsburg
- Quarter of Hamburg
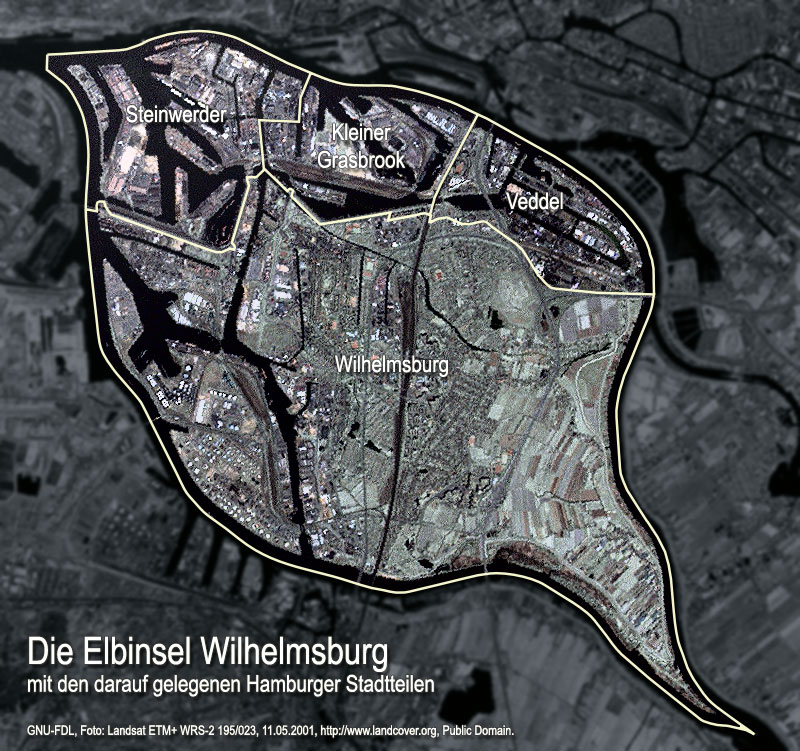
- Aerial photo of Wilhelmsburg

- Coat of arms

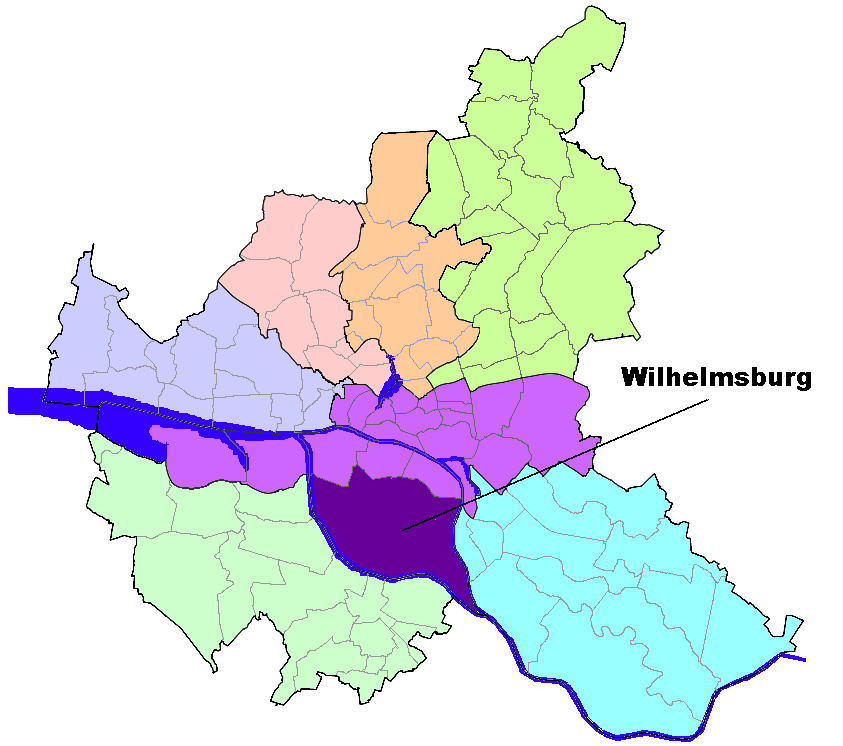
- Location of Wilhelmsburg
- Interactive map of Wilhelmsburg
- Location within Germany Location within Hamburg
- Coordinates: 53°29′42″N 10°00′40″E
- Country: Germany
- State: Hamburg
- City: Hamburg
- Borough: Hamburg-Mitte

Area
  - Total: 35.3 km^{2} (13.6 sq mi)

Population (2024-12-31)
  - Total: 54,073
  - Density: 1,530/km^{2} (3,970/sq mi)
- Time zone: UTC+01:00 (CET)
  - Summer (DST): UTC+02:00 (CEST)
- Dialling codes: 040
- Vehicle registration: HH

Wilhelmsburg (German pronunciation: [ˈvɪlhɛlmsˌbʊʁk]; Low German: Willemsborg) is a quarter (Stadtteil) of Hamburg, Germany within the borough (Bezirk) of Hamburg-Mitte. It is situated on several islands between the Northern and Southern branches of the Elbe river (Norderelbe and Süderelbe), together with the other quarters of Steinwerder, Veddel and Kleiner Grasbrook. The latter almost exclusively consists of facilities of the port of Hamburg. In 2020 the population was 53,064.

== History ==
In 1642, George William, Duke of Brunswick-Lüneburg acquired three islets in the river Elbe and connected them by means of dams. The resultant island was named Wilhelmsburg in his honour.

In 1705, the Principality of Lüneburg passed on to the Electorate of Hanover, and Wilhelmsburg became part of the Hanoverian state, which then subsequently became the Prussian Province of Hanover in 1866. In 1925, the Prussian authorities designated Wilhelmsburg as a city district, and merged it with nearby Harburg two years later to form the city of Harburg-Wilhelmsburg.

In 1937, Harburg-Wilhelmsburg, along with the cities from the Prussian Province of Schleswig-Holstein, Altona and Wandsbek, was annexed to Hamburg in the Greater Hamburg Act.

During World War II, the port of Hamburg and therefore Wilhelmsburg were targets of the air raids of the so-called Operation Gomorrah. A subcamp to the Neuengamme concentration camp existed in Wilhelmsburg.

On the night of February 16–17, 1962, Wilhelmsburg was widely flooded and seriously damaged by the North Sea flood.

On March 1, 2008, Wilhelmsburg was transferred from the borough Harburg to the borough Hamburg-Mitte by a Hamburg law.

== Geography ==
In 2006, according to the statistical office of Hamburg and Schleswig-Holstein, the quarter Wilhelmsburg has a total area of 35.3 km^{2} (14 sq mi). Wihelmsburg borders in the north to the quarters Steinwerder, Kleiner Grasbrook and Veddel. In the east are the quarters Spadenland and Ochsenwerder of the Bergedorf borough. In the south are the quarters Neuland and Harburg of the Harburg borough and the state of Lower Saxony and in the west are the quarters Moorburg and Altenwerder of the Harburg borough.

== Demographics ==
In 2006, Wilhelmsburg had 49,132 inhabitants. The population density was 1,394/km^{2} (3,610/sq mi). 22.6% of the population were under the age of 18, and 14.6% were 65 years of age or older. 33.7% were resident aliens. 4,298 people were registered as unemployed. In 1999 there were 21,345 households, out of which 26.8% had children under the age of 18 living with them and 39.9% of all households were made up of individuals. The average household size was 2.18.

Population by year

1987	1988	1989	1990	1991	1992	1993	1994	1995	1996	1997	1998	1999
44,047	44,477	45,636	46,686	46,876	47,523	47,729	47,670	47,772	47,604	47,256	46,280	46,110

2000	2001	2002	2003	2004	2005	2006
46,125	47,180	47,857	47,847	48,322	48,957	49,132

In 2006, there were 7,204 criminal offences (147 crimes per 1,000 people).

There were 8 elementary schools and 6 secondary schools in the quarter Wilhelmsburg and 52 physicians in private practice and 11 pharmacies.

== Politics ==
These are the results of Wilhelmsburg in the Hamburg state election:

State Election	SPD	Left	Greens	CDU	AfD	FDP	Others
2025	35.4 %	22.5 %	12.0 %	10.4 %	8.9 %	1.2 %	9.6 %
2020	44.6 %	17.7 %	17.4 %	5.9 %	6.3 %	1.9 %	6.2 %
2015	48.2 %	14.8 %	11.3 %	9.0 %	6.8 %	3.7 %	6.2 %
2011	53.2 %	10.8 %	8.1 %	15.3 %	–	3.4 %	9.2 %
2008	43.6 %	8.7 %	5.6 %	35.6 %	–	2.6 %	4.8 %
2004	35.5 %	–	6.1 %	43.0 %	–	1.6 %	13.8 %
2001	36.2 %	0.3 %	3.4 %	19.1 %	–	2.1 %	38.9 %
1997	41.8 %	0.4 %	6.7 %	25.6 %	–	1.8 %	23.7 %
1993	47.7 %	–	7.2 %	17.5 %	–	2.4 %	25.2 %
1991	59.4 %	0.2 %	3.3 %	28.0 %	–	2.6 %	6.5 %
1987	58.4 %	–	3.6 %	33.5 %	–	2.9 %	1.6 %
1986	55.7 %	–	5.8 %	34.3 %	–	2.3 %	1.9 %
Dec 1982	65.7 %	–	3.9 %	28.3 %	–	1.3 %	0.8 %
Jun 1982	56.3 %	–	4.9 %	33.3 %	–	3.5 %	2.0 %
1978	66.7 %	–	2.1 %	26.5 %	–	2.5 %	2.2 %
1974	60.5 %	–	–	29.0 %	–	7.1 %	3.4 %
1970	68.0 %	–	–	24.1 %	–	3.2 %	4.7 %
1966	72.4 %	–	–	21.5 %	–	3.3 %	2.8 %

== Economy ==
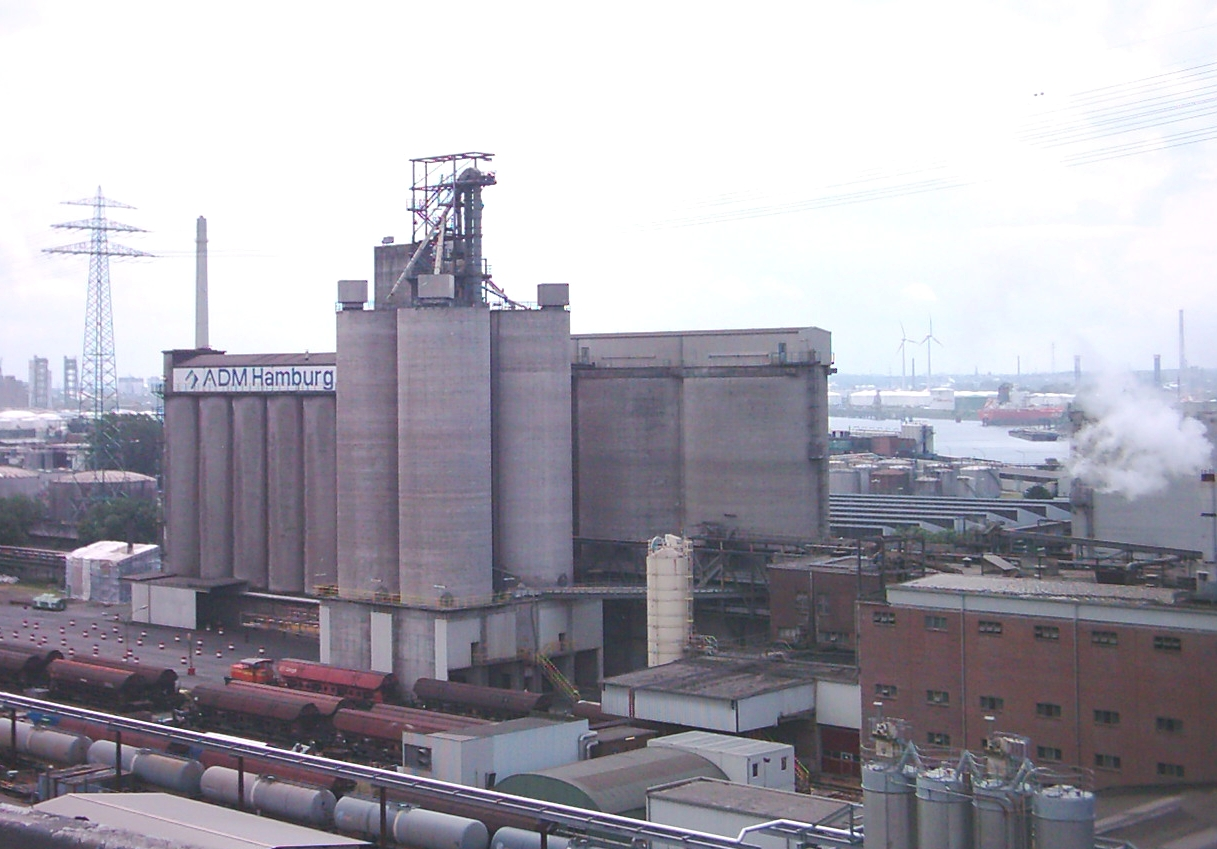
View of the company ADM Hamburg AG from the Köhlbrand Bridge (2007)

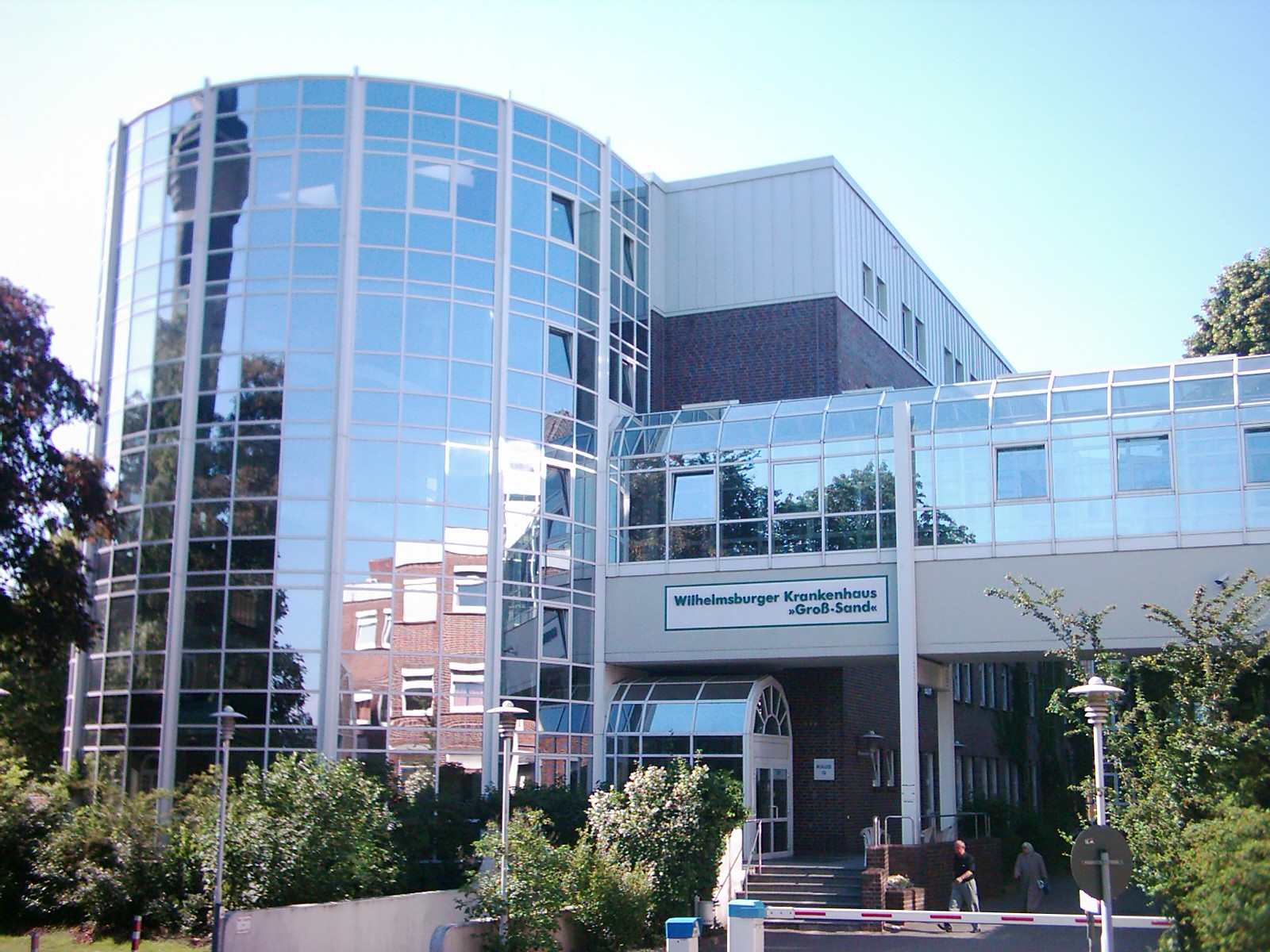
Hospital Groß Sand

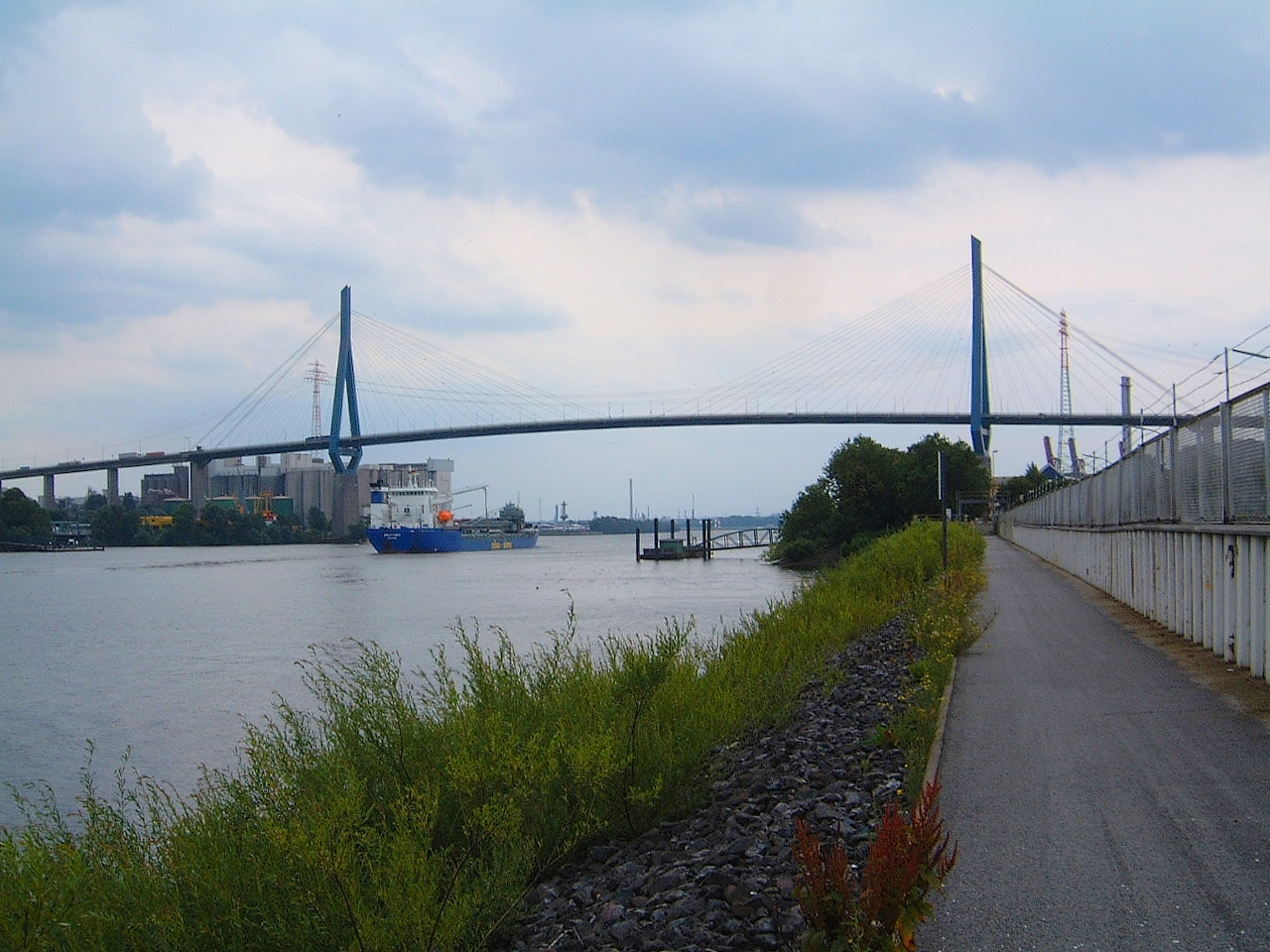
View of the Köhlbrand Bridge from the North (2004)

Parts of the port of Hamburg are located in Wilhelmsburg.

== Infrastructure ==
The hospital Wilhelmsburger Krankenhaus Groß Sand has 257 beds and a day care center for geriatrics.

== Transportation ==
Wilhelmsburg is serviced by the rapid transit system of the city train with the Wilhelmsburg station.

The islands of Wilhelmsburg, Steinwerder, Veddel and Kleiner Grasbrook are connected via numerous bridges. The main connections to other parts of Hamburg are the Hamburger Elbbrücken (Hamburg Elbe Bridges) which consist of the Norder- und Süderelbbrücken (Northern and Southern Elbe Bridges), that connect Wilhelmsburg with the City Center of Hamburg in the north and with the quarter of Harburg in the south, the Kattwyk-Bridge (world's largest vertical lift bridge) in the southwest and the Köhlbrand Bridge which is a major connection from Wilhelmsburg to the nearby motorway 7 and the New Elbe Tunnel in the northwest.

According to the Department of Motor Vehicles (Kraftfahrt-Bundesamt), in the quarter Wilhelmsburg were 13,714 private cars registered (280 cars/1,000 people).

== Culture ==
Since 2007, the music and art festival Dockville takes place every year in summer.

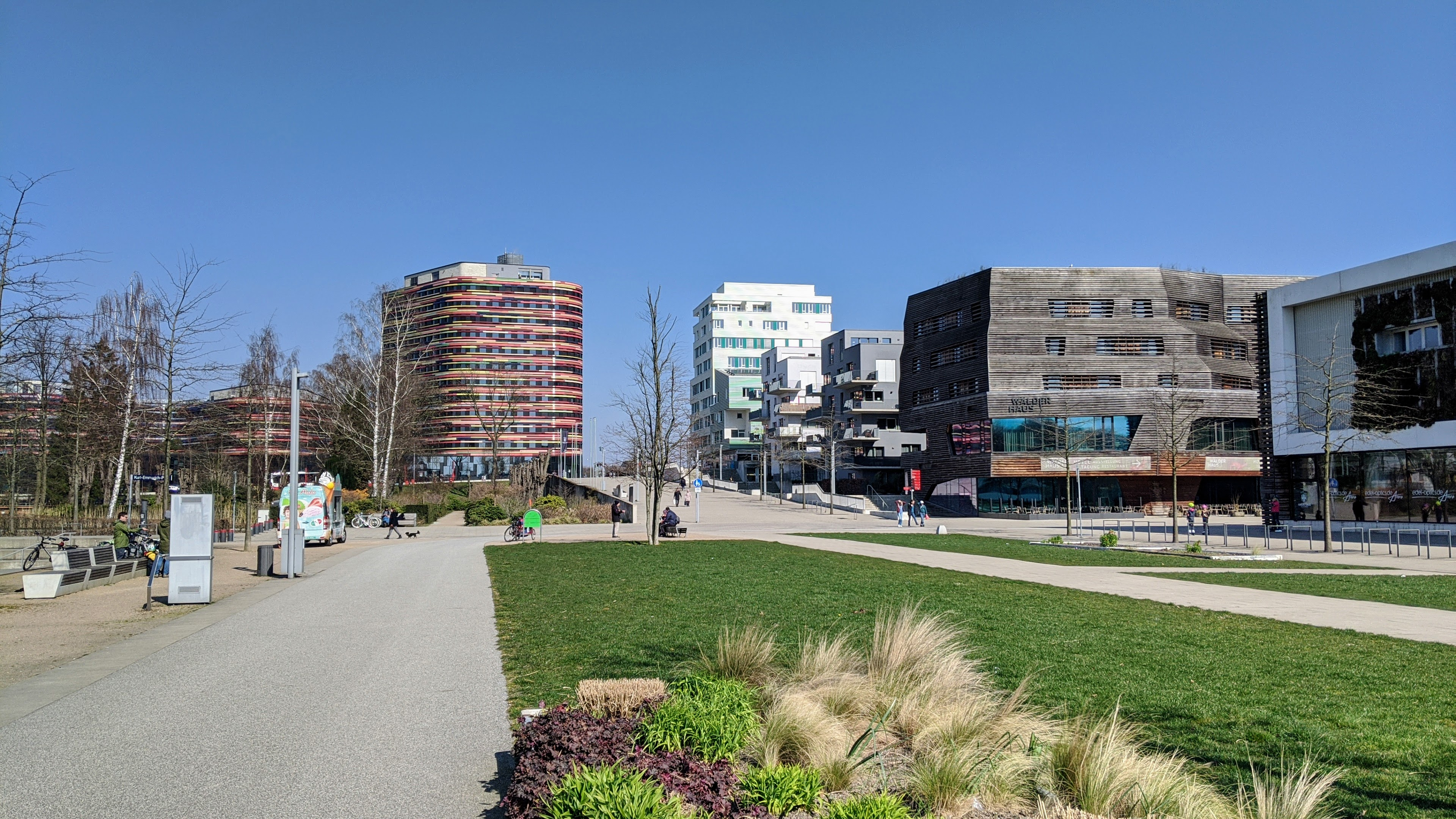
IBA buildings in the district
