= Container Terminal Altenwerder =

Container terminal in Hamburg, Germany

Coordinates: 53°30′14″N 9°56′03″E

- Location of HHLA Container Terminal Altenwerder in Hamburg CTA (Germany)

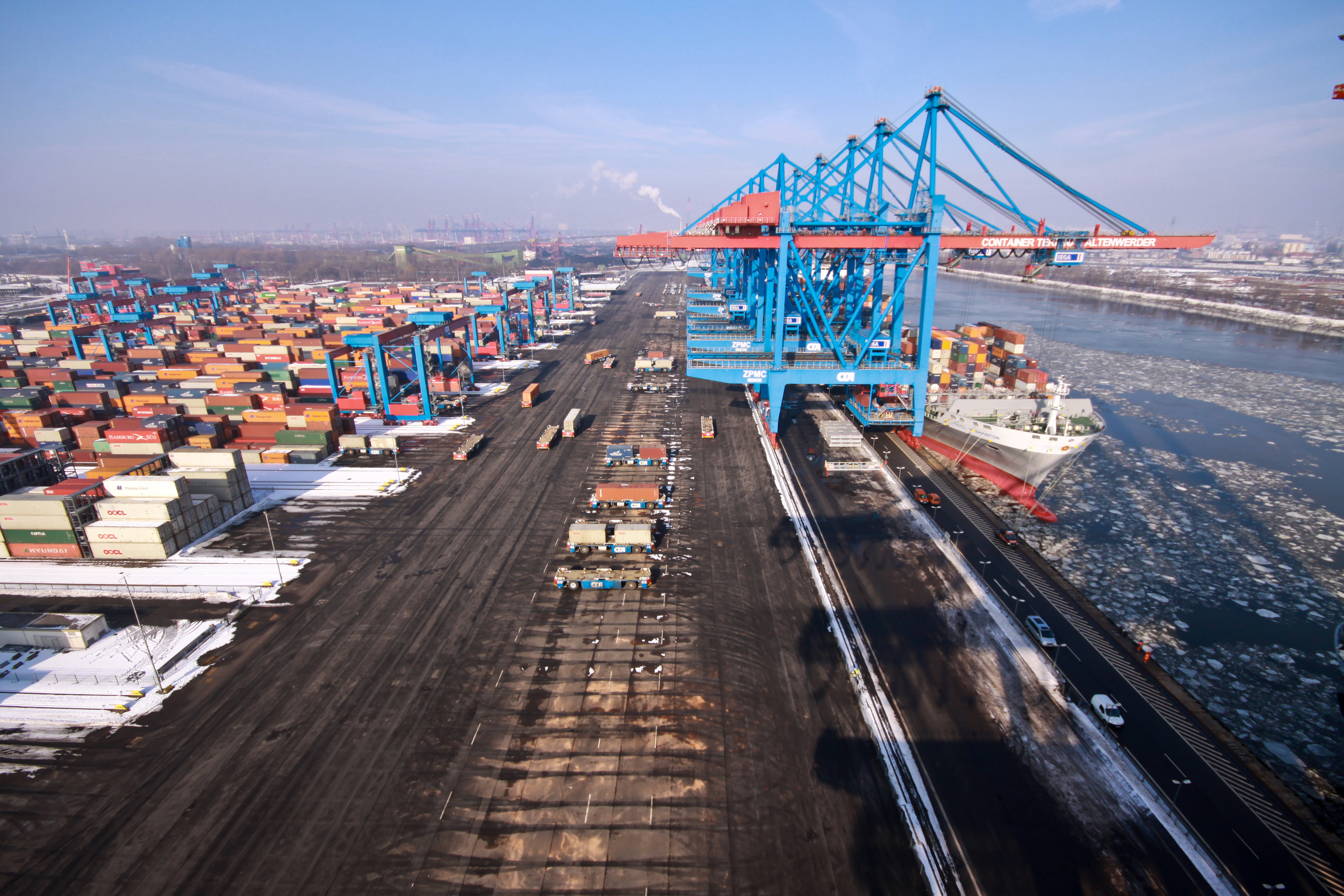
CTA in February 2010

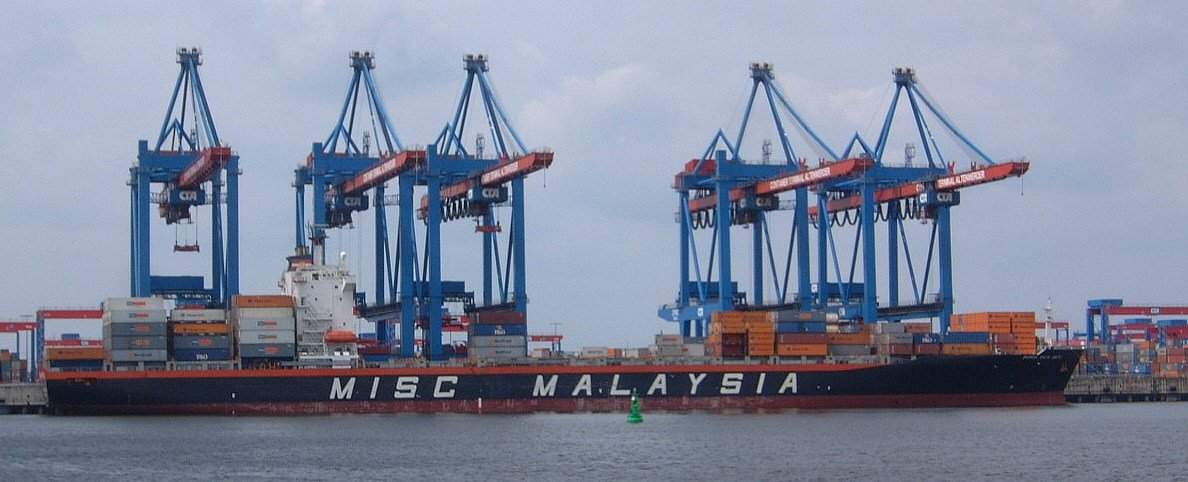
Vessel Bunga Raya Satu at CTA

The HHLA Container Terminal Altenwerder (CTA) in Hamburg, Germany, is a container handling terminal. It is located in the Altenwerder quarter. It is owned by Hamburger Hafen und Logistik AG (HHLA) (74.9%) and Hapag-LLoyd AG shipping lines (25.1%) and lies in the south of Hamburg on the river Elbe.

The terminal opened in 2001. It covers across 983,500 square metres (10,586,306 sq ft) and can process approximately 3 million TEU's annually.

== Capacity ==
It extends along a 1,400 metres (4,593 ft) long quay wall. It can load/empty up to four container ships. Maximum draught is 16.7 metres (55 ft). The quay wall has a height of 7.5 metres (25 ft) over NN (mean sea level). With 12 million M3 sand, a height difference between dock edge and base of the Elbe river of 24 metres (79 ft) was created.

The centric container area has a capacity of 30.000 TEU takes the largest part of the surface with container connections. The area is served by 22 pairs of cranes and 53 vehicles. The terminal has nearly fully automated operations.

== Loading/unloading ==
The ship docks in one of the four couch places. One of the 14 two-Katz container bridges transports containers. The crane driver in the main cat transports it on the lax platform of the bridge, where lax worker removes Twistlocks.

In the port, handling is fully automatic. As soon as one of the 65 AGVs on the land side of the bridge activates, the portal cat reloads the container. The driverless AGV crosses to the destination conveyed by radio waves while it is watched by GPS. Pedestrian access to the area of AGV drive is prohibited for security reasons.

The AGV parks in front of one of the 26 camp blocks, where a pair of gantry cranes (double Rail Mounted Gantry - DRMG) unloads the container for temporary storage. Each block covers 10 rows of 37 TEU places, at each place can four - in the external rows five containers be stacked. The DRMG consists of two independent cranes, so that the sea-side with the AGV and the opposite side with the trucks can be served simultaneously. Due to their different sizes, two cranes can work simultaneously, the smaller crane drives under the larger one.

On the back of the camp 4 tracks for trucks and 6,700 metres (21,982 ft) long railway. The container is loaded from the DRMG on the chassis of the truck by remote control.

If the container is to continue by truck, it remains on the chassis. In the case of rail transport, it is carried to the station. It is loaded there by one of three manual rail cranes on the train. Drivers receive their driving orders from radio data transmission terminals within the CTA.

Before leaving the port, the railway or the road, another tariff control takes place.
