= Simon of Utrecht =

German warship captain

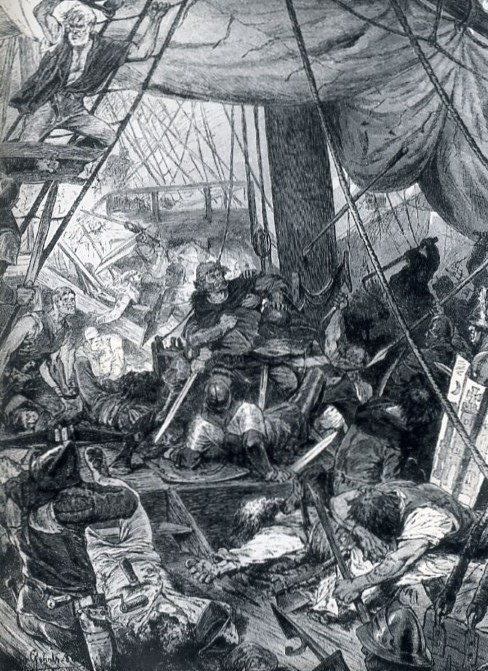
Battle against the Likedeelers, 1401

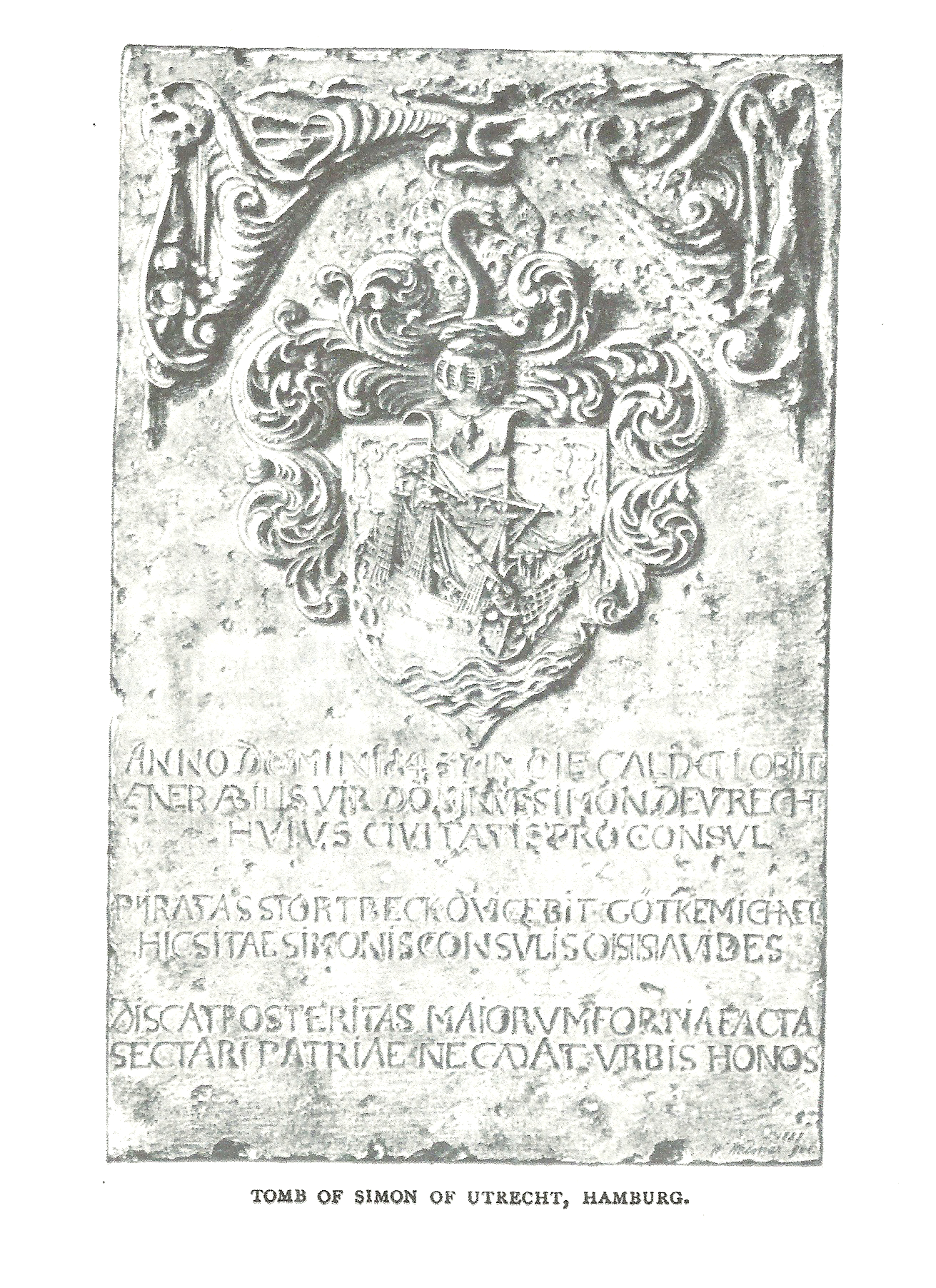
1889 Illustration of Simon of Utrecht memorial stone outside St Nikolai Church.

Simon of Utrecht (Simon van Utrecht, died 14 October 1437) was a warship captain of the Hanseatic League during the Middle Ages. He was probably born in Flanders, but emigrated to Hamburg, Germany, where he received citizenship in 1400. He became famous for his participation in the capturing the pirate Klaus Störtebeker in 1401.

Based on his popularity stemming from his battle against the Likedeelers at Heligoland, he was voted into Hamburg's city council in 1425. Despite his political obligations, he continued to participate in sea battles, for example the war between the Hanseatic League and the Danish islands in 1428. From 1432 until 1433, he commandeered the Hanseatic fleet fighting Frisian looters, culminating in the destruction of the Frisian pirate base Sebaldusburg and occupation of their capital Emden. For his merits in the fight against the enemies of the Hanseatic League, he was named the only "honorary Mayor" of the city of Hamburg in 1433.

Simon of Utrecht died on 14 October 1437 in Hamburg and was buried in the St. Nikolai Church in Hamburg. In 1566, his descendants sold the grave to Hinrich Rheder, but the Hamburg Senate intervened and reversed the deal. In 1661, the grave was sold to Jürgen Kellinghusen.

Utrecht's burial stone is property of the Museum for Hamburg History.

Several bridges and streets in cities of the Hanseatic League such as Hamburg and Rostock were named in honor of Simon of Utrecht. In Lübeck, the medieval capital of the Hanseatic League, a whole city district was named after Utrecht's flagship Bunte Kuh (transl. "Brindled Cow").

== Statue ==
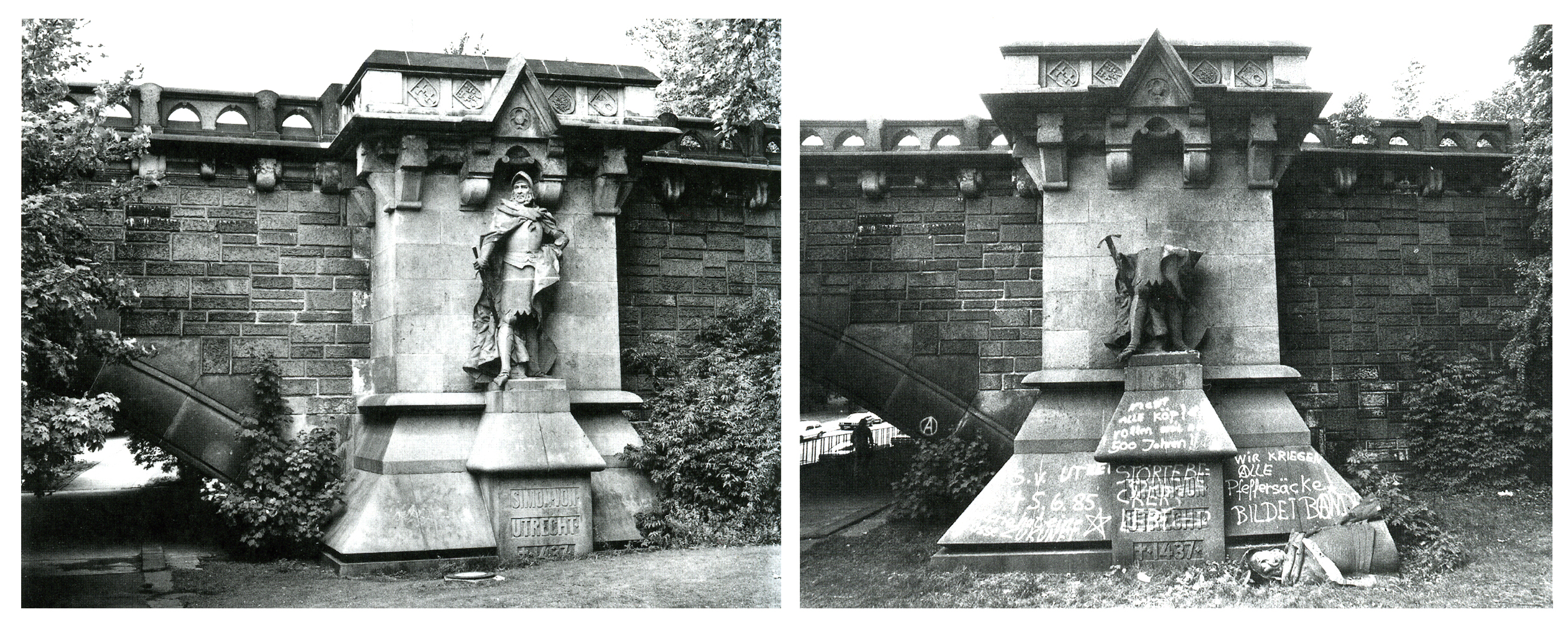
Beheaded statue of van Utrecht in 1985.

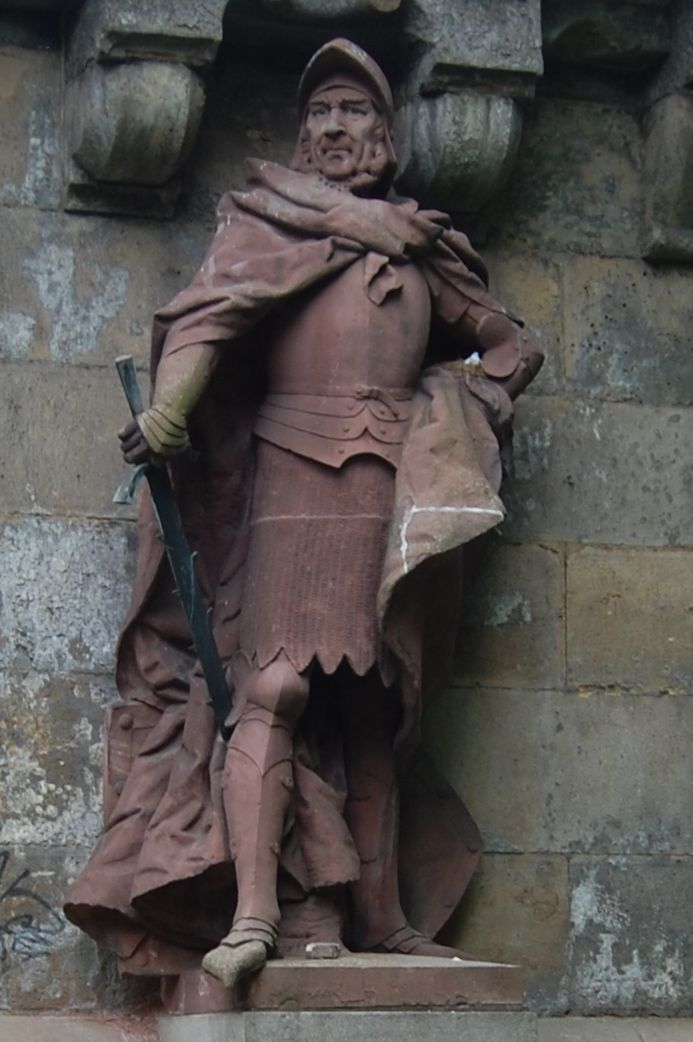
The restored statue in Hamburg (2012)

In 1897 the Kersten-Miles-Brücke (Kersten-Miles-Bridge) in Hamburg-Neustadt was inaugurated, featuring four statues of personalities important to Hamburg's history, one of which depicted Simon of Utrecht. The vandalism of this statue in 1985 is considered as a political act, as the graffiti placed on the bottom of the statue indicated. The graffiti slogans said Wir kriegen alle Pfeffersäcke! (We will get hold of all Pfeffersäcke! Pfeffersack is a derogatory term referring to the wealthiest amongst the merchants of the Hanse) and Nicht alle Köpfe rollen erst nach 500 Jahren! (Not all heads roll off after 500 years only!). This incident is considered to be a reaction to van Utrecht's involvement in the seizing and beheading of Gödeke Michels, a famous pirate during the late 14th century. The statue has since been restored.

== See also ==
- List of mayors of Hamburg
