= Störtebeker Braumanufaktur =

German brewery

Störtebeker Braumanufaktur GmbH
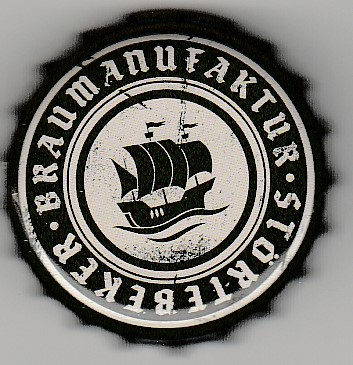
- Type: GmbH
- Location: Stralsund, Germany
- Coordinates: 54°17′26″N 13°5′41″E
- Opened: 1827
- Annual production volume: 300,000 hectolitres (260,000 US bbl) in 2020
- Owned by: Nordmann Unternehmensgruppe
- Employees: 145
- Website: stoertebeker.com

Störtebeker Braumanufaktur GmbH is a brewery in Stralsund, Germany, which produces beer under the brands "Störtebeker" and "Stralsunder", as well as mineral water and other non-alcoholic beverages. The brewery adopted its present name in 2011; before this, it was known as Stralsunder Brauerei GmbH. The name is a homage to the German pirate Klaus Störtebeker.

== History ==
Störtebeker Braumanufaktur was founded in 1827 as "Stralsunder Vereinsbrauerei" and served the surrounding area, including a number of resorts along the Baltic coast. Due to increasing demand, the brewery constructed a new building along the Greifswalder Chaussee with modern technology, including one of the first mechanical refrigeration units.

After the Second World War, operations continued, and the brewery was reincorporated as a publicly owned Volkseigener Betrieb (VEB). Due to aging technology and the difficulty of acquiring quality raw materials, the quality and profitability of the brewery declined. After German reunification, the brewery was purchased by Nordmann Unternehmensgruppe in 1991, which invested in modernization and the creation of the new "Braugasthaus Alter Fritz".

== Production ==
In 2005, the brewery was producing 88,000 hectolitres (75,000 US bbl) per year, and the brewery invested in new production capacity. In May 2010, the brewery purchased two 120,000 liter tanks for the production of Bernstein-Weizen. By 2013, the brewery produced 110,000 hectolitres (94,000 US bbl), in 2014, this had risen to 123,000 hectolitres (105,000 US bbl). In 2016, Störtebeker's most successful year to date, the brewery produced and sold 180,000 hectolitres (150,000 US bbl). By 2020, this figure had increased to 300,000 hectolitres (260,000 US bbl)
