= Altenwerder =

- Quarter of Hamburg
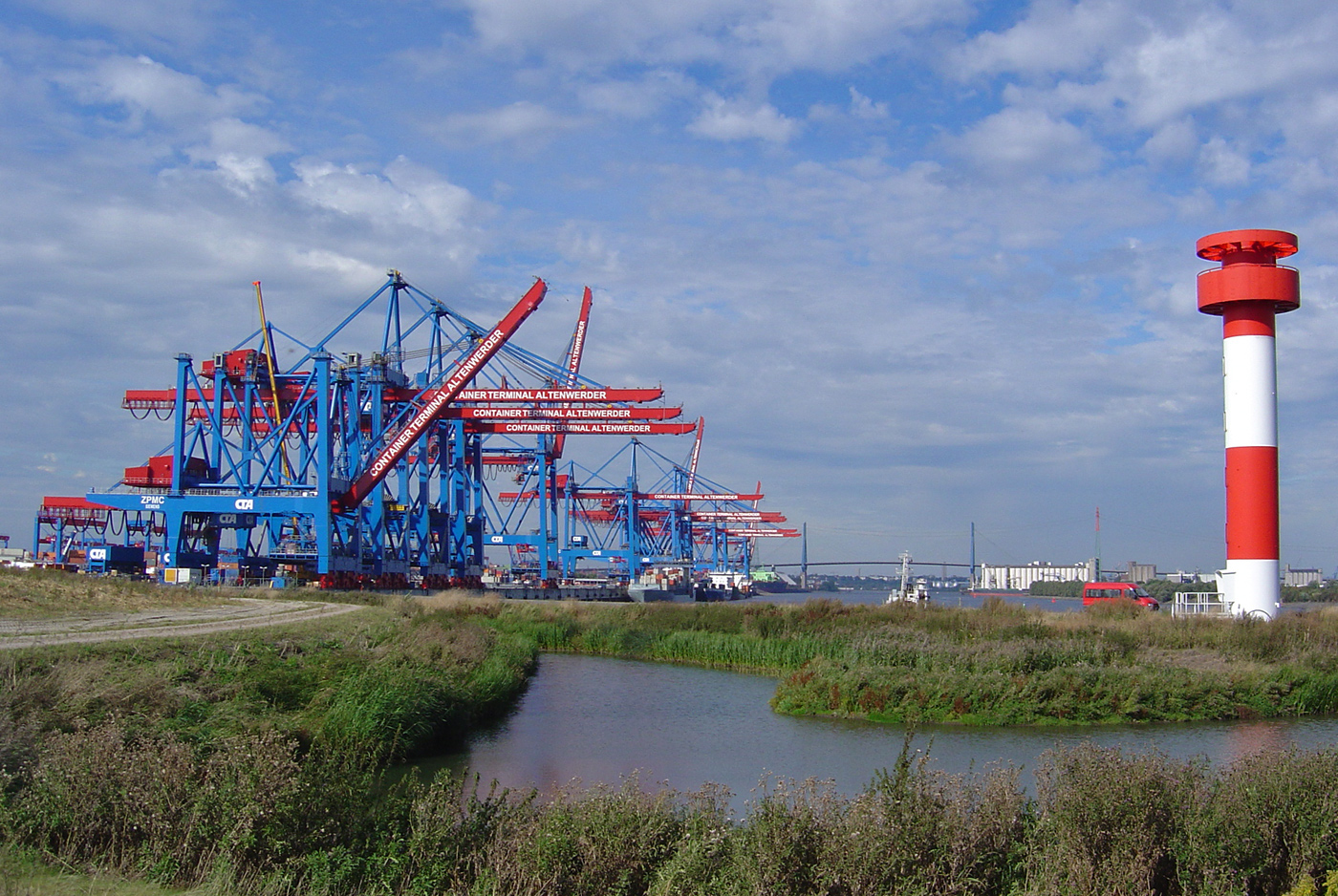
- Container Terminal Altenwerder in 2004

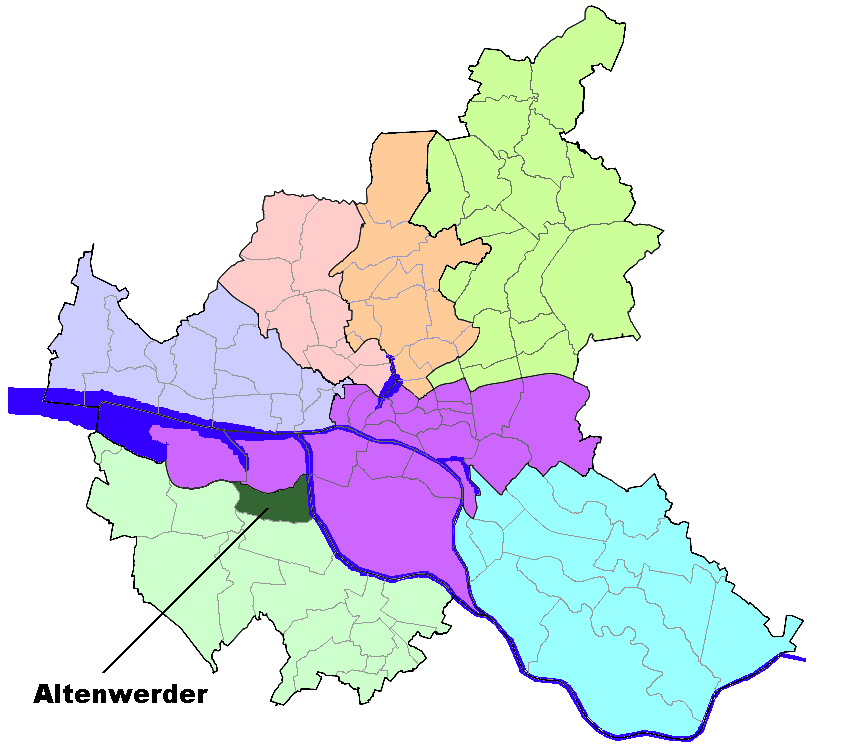
- Location of Altenwerder in Hamburg
- Interactive map of Altenwerder
- Location within Germany Location within Hamburg
- Coordinates: 53°30′0″N 9°55′0″E
- Country: Germany
- State: Hamburg
- City: Hamburg
- Borough: Harburg, Hamburg

Area
  - Total: 6.8 km^{2} (2.6 sq mi)

Population (2024-12-31)
  - Total: 2
  - Density: 0.29/km^{2} (0.76/sq mi)
- Time zone: UTC+01:00 (CET)
  - Summer (DST): UTC+02:00 (CEST)
- Dialling codes: 040
- Vehicle registration: HH

Altenwerder (German pronunciation) is a quarter in the Harburg borough of the Free and Hanseatic city of Hamburg in northern Germany. The former village on an Elbe island became a port expansion area in the 1960s. In the 1970s the city of Hamburg announced the formal dispossession of all property to build the Container Terminal Altenwerder. Only the Altenwerder church remains from the old buildings. The terminal started its operation in 2003. Today, Altenwerder is a quarter almost without population. In 2023 the population was 4.

== History ==
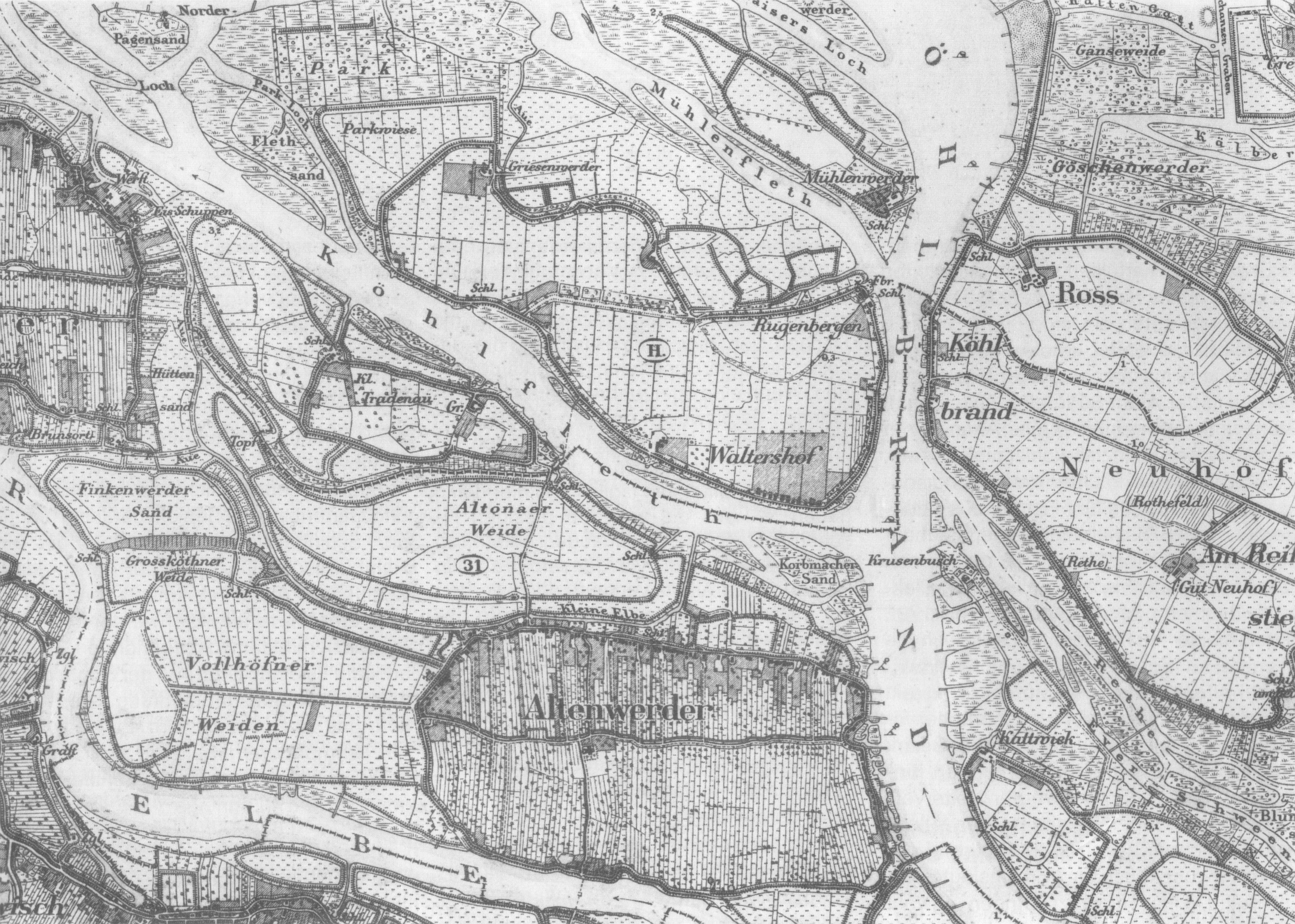
Map of Altenwerder in 1878

The island of Altenwerder was separated from the diked Elbe island of Gorieswerder by the Allerkindlein flood in 1248. The oldest surviving documents mentioning the village of Altenwerder do not mention a date, but have been dated by historians to around 1250. In addition, feudal registers of the Corvey monastery give indirect evidence that Altenwerder may have been used or settled before 844.[1] The name, shown in the early documents as Oldenwerdere, is justified by the fact that this Elbe island, compared to Finkenwerder or Silrandiswerder, was settled earlier and for a longer time, Werder meaning river island.

Since parts of the land had become uninhabitable due to a series of storm surges, among them especially the Cäcilien flood in 1412, Altenwerder was newly diked on the basis of a treaty of February 27, 1418 by the two sovereigns Johann Slamsdorp, the Prince-Archbishop of Bremen and the Duke of Brunswick-Lüneburg.

== Geography ==
In 2006 according to the statistical office of Hamburg and Schleswig-Holstein, the quarter Altenwerder has a total area of 6.8 km^{2}. In the north is the quarter Waltershof of the borough Hamburg-Mitte, in the east is the quarter Wilhelmsburg. Alternwerder borders in the South to Moorburg and in the West to Francop.

== Demographics ==
In 2016 in the quarter Altenwerder were living 3 people.

In 1999 there were 18 households, out of which 11.1% had children under the age of 18 living with them and 83.3% of all households were made up of individuals. The average household size was 1.44.

Population by year

1987	1988	1989	1990	1991	1992	1993	1994	1995	1996	1997	1998	1999
76	74	67	90	105	421	410	319	324	130	52	37	23

2000	2001	2002	2003	2004	2005	2006	2007	2008	2009	2010	2011	2017
1	12	0	n/a	0	0	2	2	3	3	3	3	3

In 2006 there were 54 criminal offences.

== Notes ==
=== References ===
- Statistical office Hamburg and Schleswig-Holstein Statistisches Amt für Hamburg und Schleswig-Holstein, official website (in German)
