= Lucille Eichengreen =

American memoirist (1925–2020)

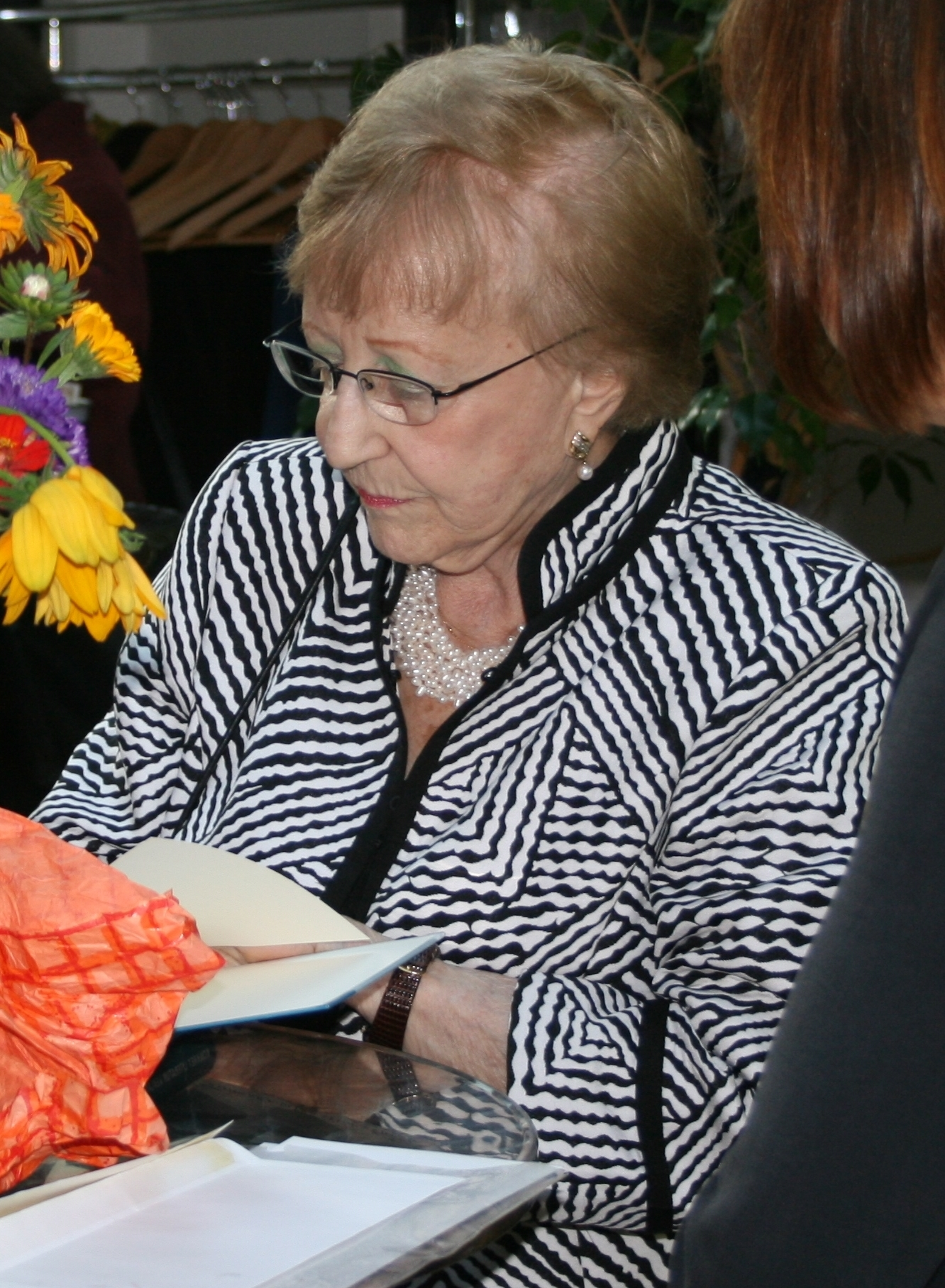
- Eichengreen in 2012
- Born: Cecilie Landau; February 1, 1925; Hamburg, Germany
- Died: February 7, 2020 (aged 95); Oakland, California, U.S.
- Occupation: Writer
- Organization: University of Giessen
- Known for: Holocaust survivor

Lucille Eichengreen (née Cecilie Landau; February 1, 1925 – February 7, 2020) was a survivor of the Łódź (Litzmannstadt) Ghetto and the Nazi German concentration camps of Auschwitz, Neuengamme and Bergen-Belsen. She moved to the United States in 1946, married, had two sons and worked as an insurance agent. In 1994, she published From Ashes to Life: My Memories of the Holocaust. She frequently lectured on the Holocaust at libraries, schools and universities in the U.S. and Germany. She took part in a documentary from the University of Giessen on life in the Ghetto, for which she was awarded an honorary doctorate.

== Life ==
Born Cecilie Landau in Hamburg, Germany, on February 1, 1925, she was the older of two daughters of the Polish-born wine merchant Benjamin Landau and his wife Sala (Sara), née Baumwollspinner. She described her childhood as "very nice, very comfortable" before Hitler came to power in 1933. After that, the Jews became exposed to growing repressive measures by the Nazis as well as insults and assaults by the local population. After returning to Hamburg in the spring of 1939, Benjamin Landau was arrested by the Gestapo on September 1 of that year during the attack on Poland, as a "foreign enemy". He was first brought to a police jail in Fuhlsbüttel, then to Oranienburg concentration camp, and finally to Dachau concentration camp, where he was murdered on December 31, 1940. The family learned of his death only in February 1941, when the Gestapo brought his ashes, "in a cigar box with a rubber band", to their apartment, as Eichengreen recalls:

Two Gestapo came to the house and threw them on the kitchen table. ... They only said 'Ashes, Benjamin Landau!' And walked out. They didn't talk.

=== Deportation ===
On October 25, 1941, she was deported, at age 16, to the Łódź (Litzmannstadt) Ghetto with her mother and her younger sister Karin. In the ghetto, her mother starved to death, dying on July 13, 1942. Lucille found work and survived, living under inhumane conditions. Karin, whom she took care of, was separated from her at age eleven in September 1942, deported to Chełmno extermination camp and murdered. Lucille was among female office workers who suffered sexual abuse from ghetto leader Chaim Rumkowski, of which she recalled: "I felt disgusted and I felt angry [...] but if I would have run away he would have had me deported."

Lucille worked as a secretary for the journalist and writer Oskar Singer. In 1943, she was hit on the left ear during an interrogation by the Nazi police after a denunciation, resulting in permanent deafness in that ear. In August 1944, she was deported to Auschwitz concentration camp, where she was deemed fit to work during the selection process. A few weeks later, when she went through another selection process, concentration camp doctor Josef Mengele sent her to the satellite camp Dessauer Ufer of KZ Neuengamme, where she was forced to perform heavy labour, working in construction and removing detritus from bomb damage. Later, she was assigned to office work, although she was still exposed to mistreatment from supervisors. In March 1945, she was deported to Bergen-Belsen concentration camp.

=== After liberation of the concentration camps ===
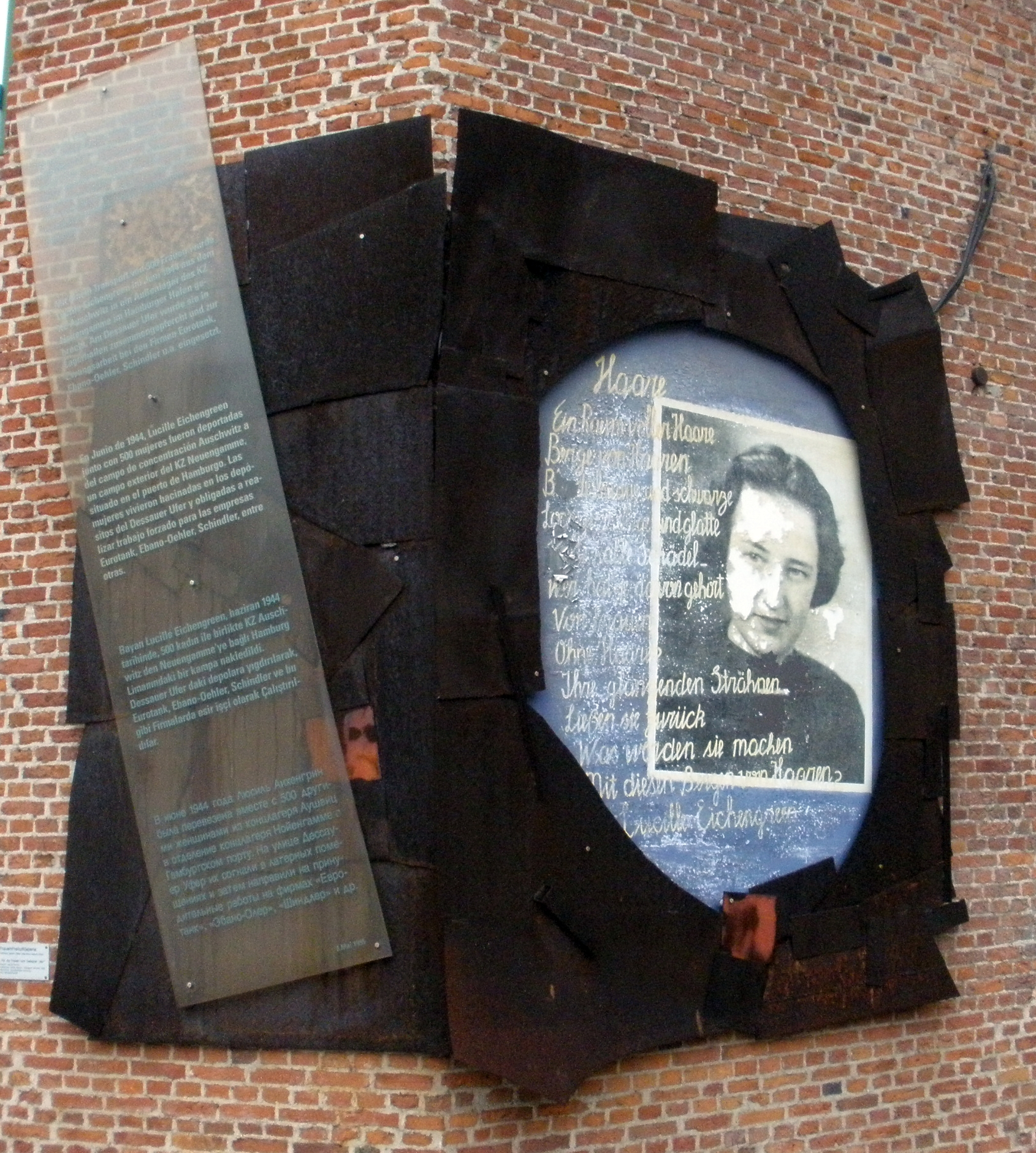
Commemorative plaque with an image of Lucille Eichengreen

Landau was the only member of her immediate family to survive the Holocaust, although it was not until 1947 that she was certain that her sister had died. After the liberation of the Bergen-Belsen camp by the British army, she spent a few months in the camp for displaced persons in Bergen-Belsen, working as a translator for the British. In cooperation with the British forces, she identified 40 members of the SS as having worked in the Neuengamme concentration camp, leading to their arrest and trial before a court.

After receiving death threats, Landau moved to the United States, where she married another Jewish emigrant from Hamburg, Dan Eichengreen. According to her own account, she struggled to overcome the effects of the traumatic events of her youth and suffered from recurring nightmares. In 1995, she returned to Poland and Germany for the first time since 1945, including a visit to Hamburg after accepting an invitation by the Hamburg senate. She also returned to Auschwitz and the former Łódź ghetto.

Eichengreen last lived in Oakland, California. One of her two sons is the American economist Barry Eichengreen. She died on February 7, 2020 at the age of 95.

== Work ==
In the 1990s, Eichengreen began to write her memoirs for publication. Her book From Ashes to Life. My Memories of the Holocaust. was published in the United States in 1994. After first visiting Germany, she lectured in schools, universities and at commemorative events. She worked with the research unit for Holocaust literature at the University of Giessen on the chronicles of the Łódź ghetto, a text which gives an account of life in the ghetto. For her involvement, she was awarded an honorary doctorate in the field of language, culture and literature from the university in May 2007.

During a 2009 exhibition in Hamburg with the title In den Tod geschickt. Die Deportation von Juden, Roma und Sinti aus Hamburg 1940 bis 1945 (Sent to Death: The Deportation of Jews, Roma and Sinti from Hamburg, 1940 to 1945), she was awarded the Hamburger Ehrendenkmünze in Gold (Hamburg gold medal of honour) by mayor Ole von Beust. In 2015, a commemorative volume (Festschrift) honoring her work was published.
