= Victual Brothers =

Northern European pirates (1393–1440)

- Vitalienbrüder
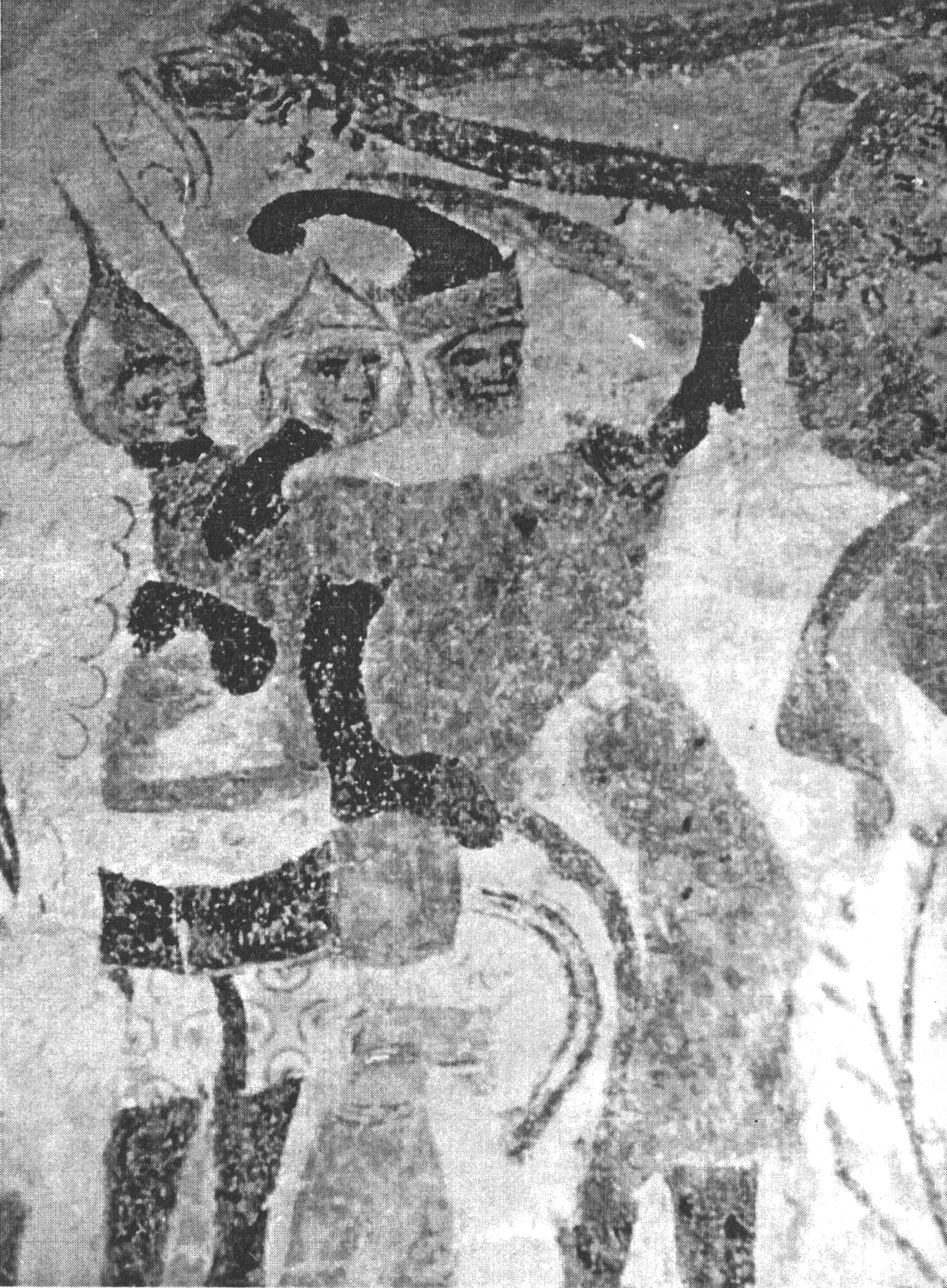
- One of the few contemporary representations of the Victual Brothers from a wall painting in Bunge church, Gotland, Sweden, c. 1405
- Successor: Likedeelers
- Formation: 1393
- Dissolved: 1440
- Headquarters: Visby, Gotland, Sweden
- Location(s): North Sea and Baltic Seas, Germany and Scandinavia
- Region served: Northern Europe
- Methods: Privateering, blockade running, piracy
- Key people: Klaus Störtebeker; Gottfried Michaelsen; Hennig Wichmann; Magister Wigbold

The Victual Brothers (German: Vitalienbrüder) were a loosely organized guild of privateers who later turned to piracy. They affected maritime trade during the 14th and 15th centuries in both the North and Baltic Seas.

They were initially hired in 1392 by the Dukes of Mecklenburg to support their fight against Queen Margaret I of Denmark, who was besieging Stockholm. Named after the Latin word victualia ('provisions'), their mission was to supply the city with goods. They initially had the support of most of the Hanseatic league apart from Lübeck. Over time, they became notorious pirates, attacking coastal towns around the Baltic region, so that the maritime trade in the Baltic Sea virtually collapsed. At the peak of their power in 1394, they took over the island of Gotland. Their influence in the Baltic region declined after the Teutonic Order drove them out of Gotland in 1398.

After being expelled, the remaining Victual Brothers, now calling themselves the Likedeelers ('equal sharers'), continued their piracy and expanded their activities into the North Sea and along the Atlantic coast, raiding as far as France and Spain. Their most famous leader was Klaus Störtebeker. The Likedeelers kept up their attacks into the early 15th century, including a major raid on Bergen in 1429.

== Guild of the Victual Brothers ==
During the 14th century, Queen Margaret I of Denmark was battling Albert of Mecklenburg for Scandinavian supremacy. Albert had been King of Sweden since 1364 and Duke of Mecklenburg since 1383. The Vitalian Brotherhood were hired in 1392 by the Dukes of Mecklenburg to fight against Denmark, after Queen Margaret had imprisoned Albert and his son Eric of Mecklenburg in order to subdue the Kingdom of Sweden. While Queen Margaret's forces were besieging Stockholm, the blockade runners who came to be known as the Victual Brotherhood engaged in war at sea and shipped provisions to keep the city supplied. The name Victual Brothers is derived from the Latin word "victualia"—meaning provisions—and refers to their first mission, which was to supply the besieged city.

The Victual Brothers were organised as a brotherhood or guild. Their main naval enemy in 1392 was the powerful Hanseatic town of Lübeck, which supported Denmark in the war. Apart from Lübeck, the Hanseatic League initially supported the Victual Brothers. Most of the Hanseatic towns had no desire for a victory for Denmark, with its strategic location for control of the seaways. For several years from 1392, the Victual Brothers were a strong power in the Baltic Sea. They had safe harbours in the cities of Rostock, Ribnitz, Wismar and Stralsund. They soon turned to open piracy and coastal plunder. In 1393 they sacked the town of Bergen for the first time and in 1394 they conquered Malmö. They occupied parts of Frisia and Schleswig. They also plundered Turku, Vyborg, Styresholm, Korsholm and Faxeholm castle at Söderhamn in Hälsingland.

At the climax of their power, the Victual Brothers occupied the island of Gotland, Sweden, in 1394 and set up their headquarters in Visby. They also operated from the Turku archipelago; Knut Bosson, who was the chief of Turku Castle from 1395 to 1398, had allied himself with the people of Mecklenburg, which is why he supported the hijacking activities of the Victual Brothers and allowed them to operate in the area. Maritime trade in the Baltic Sea virtually collapsed, and the herring industry suffered from their depredations. Queen Margaret even turned to King Richard II of England and sought to charter English ships to combat the pirates. From 1395 onwards, Queen Margaret gained the upper hand politically. She united Denmark, Sweden and Norway and formed the Kalmar Union. The Hanseatic League was forced to cooperate with her, foreshadowing its eventual decline. King Albert of Sweden conceded Gotland to the allied Teutonic Order as a pledge (similar to a fiefdom). An invasion army under Konrad von Jungingen (1355–1407), the Grand Master of the Order, conquered the island in 1398, driving the Victual Brothers out of Gotland.

== Likedeelers, successors of Victual Brothers ==
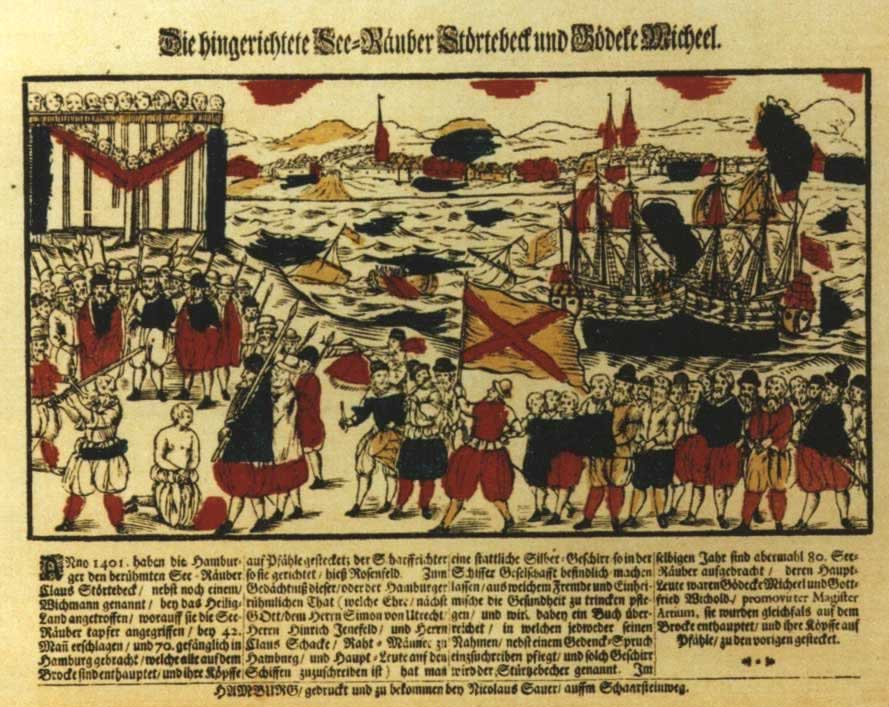
The summary execution of Störtebeker, 1401; tinted woodcut by Nicolaus Sauer, Hamburg, 1701 (Hamburger Staatsarchiv)

After the Victual Brothers' defeat and expulsion from Gotland in 1398, the Hanseatic League tried repeatedly but unsuccessfully to completely control the Baltic Sea. Many Victual Brothers still remained at sea. When they lost their influence in the Gulf of Bothnia, the Gulf of Finland and Gotland, they operated from the Schlei, the mouth of the river Ems and other locations in Friesland. The successors to the Victual Brothers gave themselves the name Likedeelers ("equal sharers"): they shared with the poor coastal population. They expanded their activities into the North Sea and along the Atlantic coastline, raiding Brabant and France and striking as far south as Spain.

Their most famous leader was Captain Klaus Störtebeker, who first appears in the record as a Victual Brother around 1394. The Low German word Störtebeker means "Down the beakerful". He allegedly got his name because he could swallow four litres of beer without taking the beaker from his mouth. However, it might simply be a family name from Wismar. In 1401 the Hamburg warship Die Bunte Kuh (literally The Colorful Cow), leading a small fleet under Commander Simon of Utrecht, caught up with Störtebeker's forces near Heligoland. After three days' running battle, Störtebeker and his crew were finally overpowered, trapped and executed.

This was not the end of piracy and coastal raiding by the Likedeelers. In 1429, some 28 years after the execution of Störtebeker, members of the Victual Brothers attacked and plundered the important trading town of Bergen, eventually burning it to the ground. Until about 1440, maritime trade in both the North and Baltic Seas was seriously in danger of attack by the Likedeelers.

== See also ==
- Thalassocracy

== Sources ==
- Meier, Dirk (2006). Seafarers, Merchants and Pirates in the Middle Ages. Translated by McGeoch, Angus. Boydell Press. ISBN 978-1-843-83237-9.
