= Sacking of Bergen (1393) =

Coordinates: 60°23′50″N 5°19′25″E

- Part of Sackings of Bergen (1393) and (1429)
Date	1393
Location	Bergen (Bjørgvin)
Result	Victual Brothers victory

Belligerents
The Victual Brothers	Kingdom of Norway

Commanders and leaders
Unknown	Unknown

Units involved
Victual Brothers fleet	Bergen garrison

Strength
Large, strong ships, 900 men	Small garrison, small ships

Casualties and losses
Unknown, probably few	Unknown, probably many

The Sacking of Bergen in 1393 was one of two attacks on Bergen by the Victual Brothers, a former trading guild turned to piracy. The second attack was many years later, in 1429. The Victual Brothers raided the town, pillaged and looted goods and killed the garrison and possibly also civilians. After they had taken control they proceeded to burn down the town before leaving with their booty.
