= Kleiner Grasbrook =

- Quarter of Hamburg
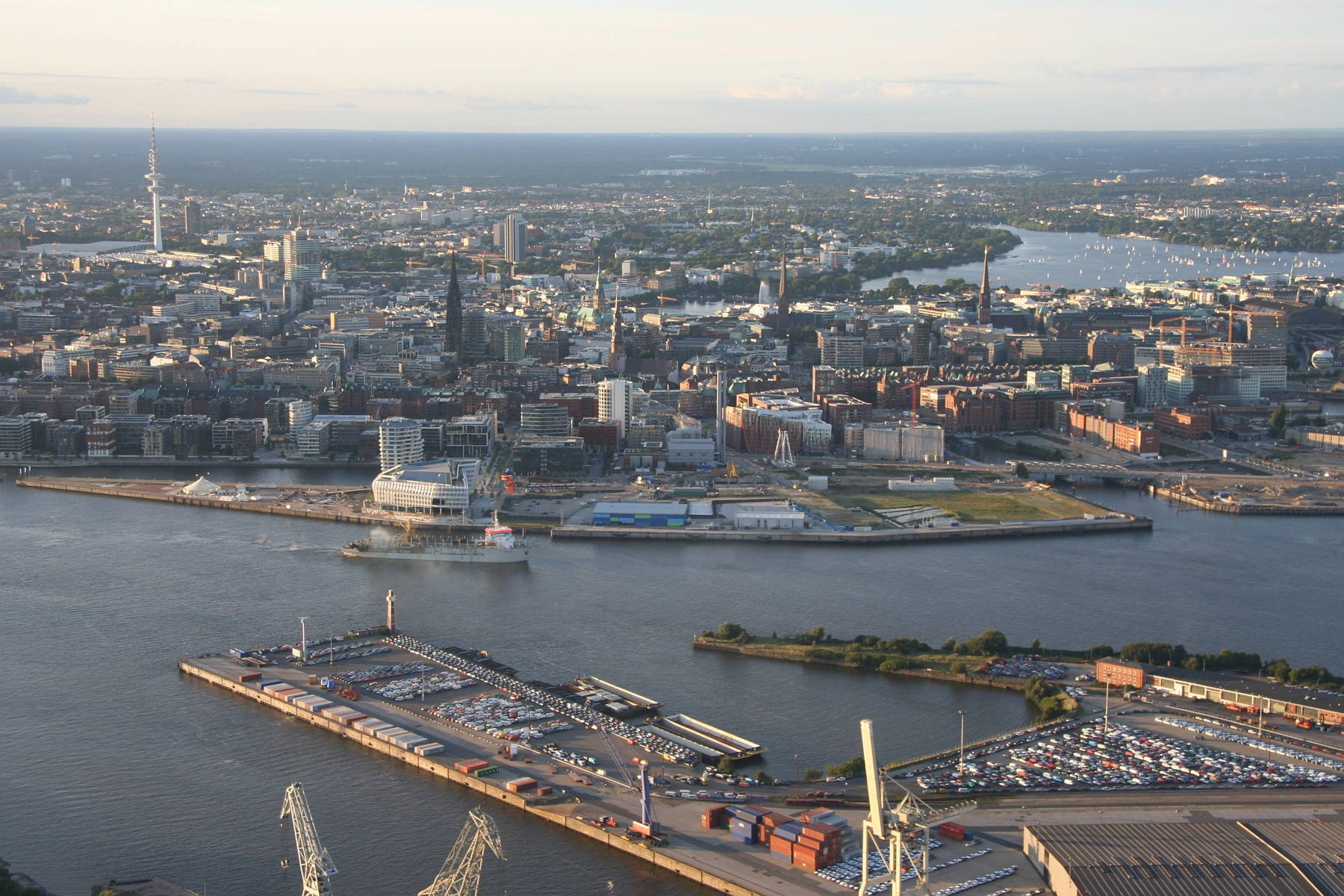
- Parts of Kleiner Grasbrook in the foreground. View towards HafenCity across the Norderelbe.

- Coat of arms

- Location of Kleiner Grasbrook
- Interactive map of Kleiner Grasbrook
- Location within Germany Location within Hamburg
- Coordinates: 53°31′52″N 9°59′37″E
- Country: Germany
- State: Hamburg
- City: Hamburg
- Borough: Hamburg-Mitte

Area
  - Total: 4.5 km^{2} (1.7 sq mi)

Population (2024-12-31)
  - Total: 1,061
  - Density: 240/km^{2} (610/sq mi)
- Time zone: UTC+01:00 (CET)
  - Summer (DST): UTC+02:00 (CEST)
- Dialling codes: 040
- Vehicle registration: HH

Kleiner Grasbrook (pronounced [ˈklaɪnɐ ˈɡʁaːsbʁoːk]) is a quarter (Stadtteil) of Hamburg, Germany within the borough (Bezirk) of Hamburg-Mitte. It is situated on the eponymous island between the Northern and Southern branches of the Elbe river (Norderelbe and Süderelbe), together with the other quarters of Steinwerder, Veddel and Wilhelmsburg. It almost exclusively consists of facilities of the port of Hamburg. The four quarters are technically all islands of their own, as they are all separated by their own dams. In 2020 the population was 1,120.

== History ==
It is believed that the privateer Klaus Störtebeker was beheaded on the Grasbrook island in 1400 or 1401.

During World War II the port of Hamburg and therefore Kleiner Grasbrook were targets of the air raids of the so-called Operation Gomorrah. From mid-July 1944 until October 1945 the subcamp Dessauer Ufer to the Neuengamme concentration camp existed in the quarter.

On the night of 16 to 17 February 1962 the island was widely flooded and seriously damaged by a north sea flood.

== Geography ==
In 2006 according to the statistical office of Hamburg and Schleswig-Holstein, the Kleiner Grasbrook quarter has a total area of 4.5 square kilometres (2 sq mi). Kleiner Grasbrook borders in the north to the HafenCity quarter. In the east is the Veddel quarter and in the west the Steinwerder quarter. In the south is the Wilhelmsburg quarter.

== Demographics ==
In 2006 Kleiner Grasbrook had 1,219 inhabitants. The population density was 274/km^{2} (710/sq mi). 12.7% of the population were under the age of 18, and 8% were 65 years of age or older. 55.9% were resident aliens. 137 people were registered as unemployed. In 1999 there were 694 households, out of which 21.3% had children under the age of 18 living with them, and 47.7% of all households were made up of individuals. The average household size was 1.95.

Population by year

1987	1988	1989	1990	1991	1992	1993	1994	1995	1996	1997	1998	1999
1,177	1,203	1,285	1,390	1,488	1,583	1,607	1,624	1,643	1,512	1,492	1,362	1,345

2000	2001	2002	2003	2004	2005	2006	2007
1,326	1,345	1,320	1,384	1,368	1,299	1,262	1,219

In 2006 there were 334 criminal offences (274 crimes per 1,000 people).

== Politics ==
These are the results of the Hamburg state election:

Election	Left	Greens	SPD	AfD	CDU	FDP	Others
2020	43,6 %	23,2 %	10,3 %	3,6 %	2,2 %	1,8 %	15,3 %
2015	31,5 %	16,2 %	19,0 %	1,6 %	3,2 %	2,6 %	25,9 %
2011	19,3 %	19,2 %	36,1 %	–	5,3 %	1,6 %	18,5 %
2008	21,1 %	14,8 %	35,2 %	–	17,2 %	0,8 %	10,9 %
2004	–	12,2 %	44,9 %	–	29,9 %	0,0 %	13,0 %
2001	0,9 %	6,1 %	41,7 %	–	24,3 %	1,7 %	25,3 %
1997	0,0 %	4,2 %	50,0 %	–	21,7 %	1,8 %	22,3 %
1993	–	4,8 %	55,9 %	–	13,1 %	0,9 %	25,3 %

== Economy ==
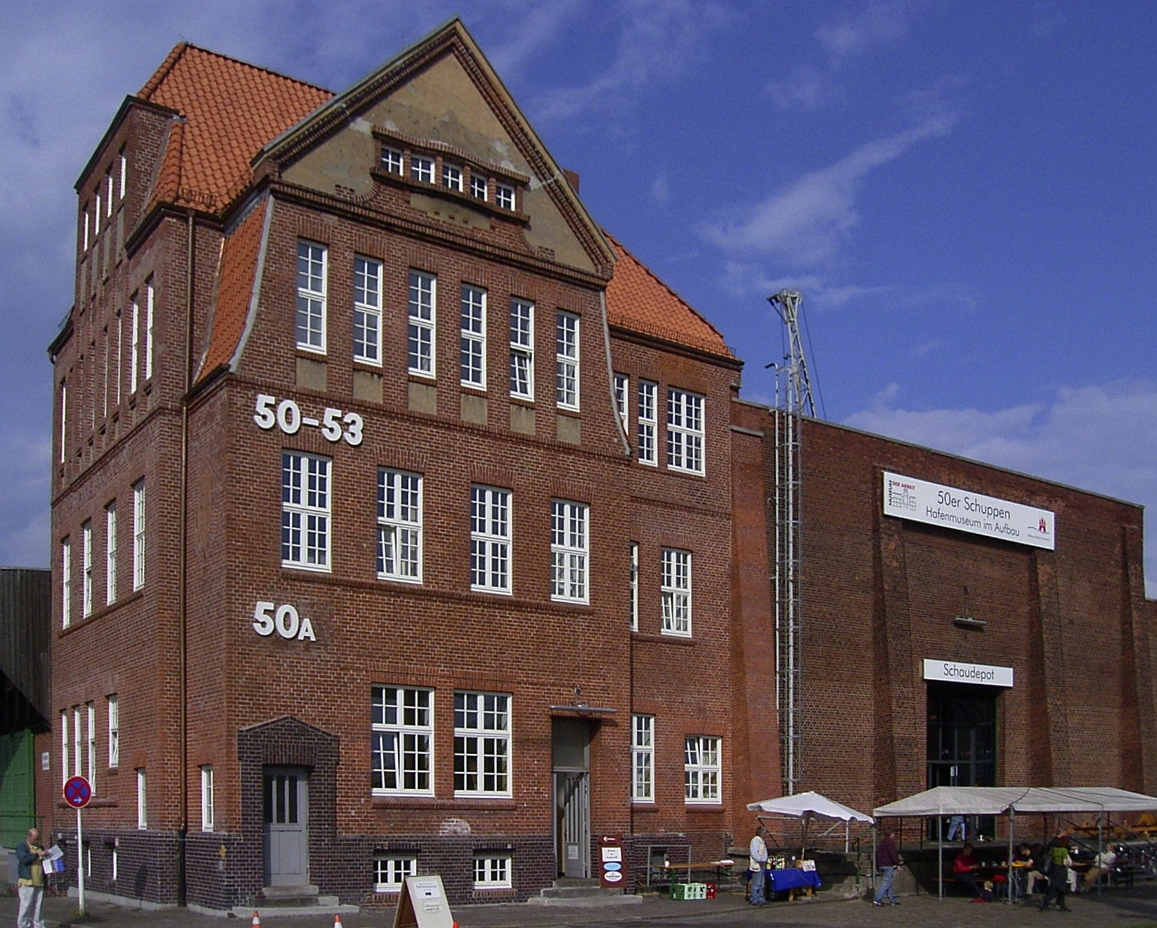
Part of the storage Schuppen 50, in 2008 branch office of the museum of work

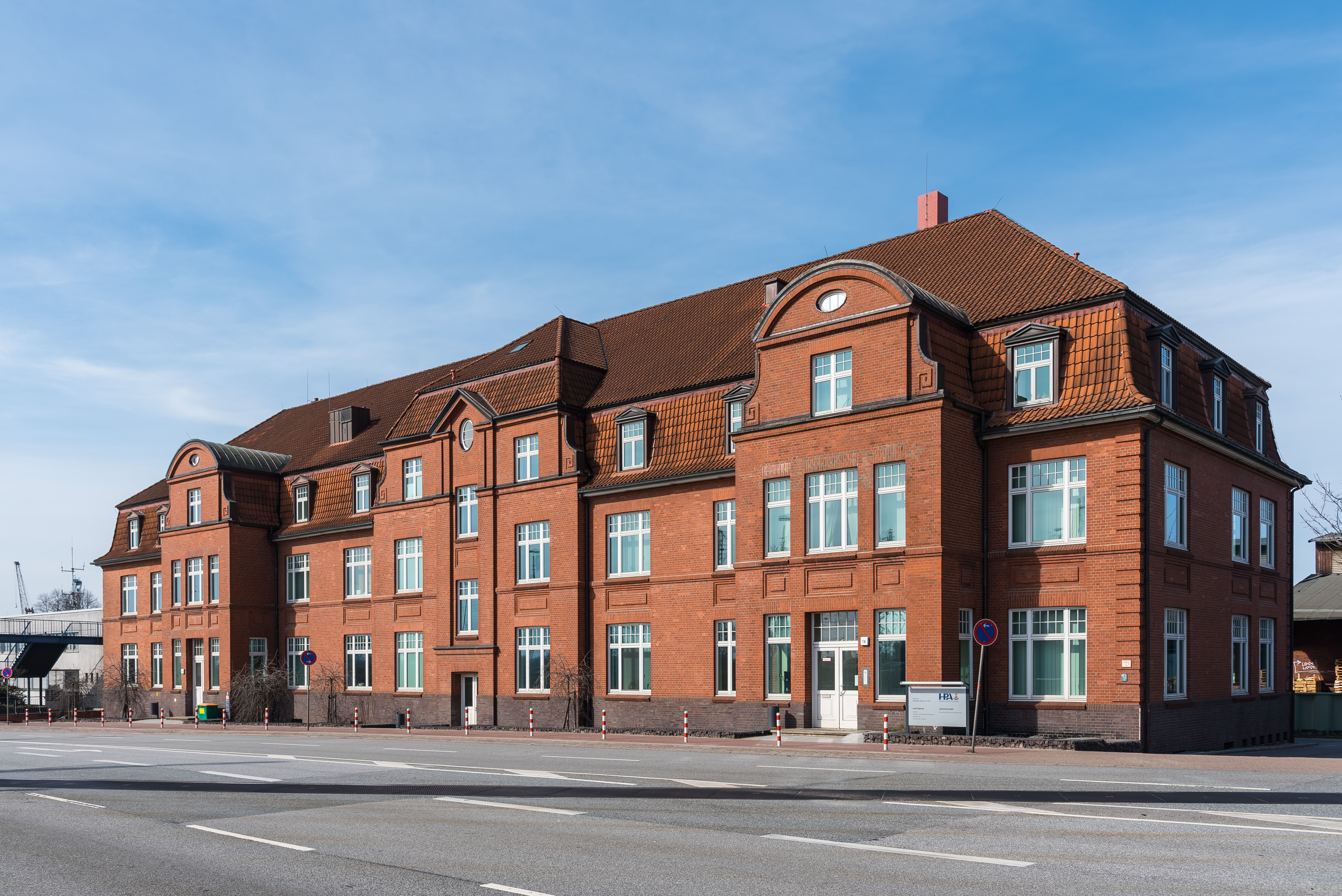
Building of the Hamburg port authority

Parts of the port of Hamburg are located in the Kleiner Grasbrook quarter.

== Infrastructure ==
There were no schools in the quarter and no physicians in private practice and no pharmacies.

=== Transportation ===
According to the Department of Motor Vehicles (Kraftfahrt-Bundesamt), in the quarter were 113 private cars registered (93 cars/1,000 people).
