= Klaus Störtebeker =

German pirate (1360–1401)

Störtebeker
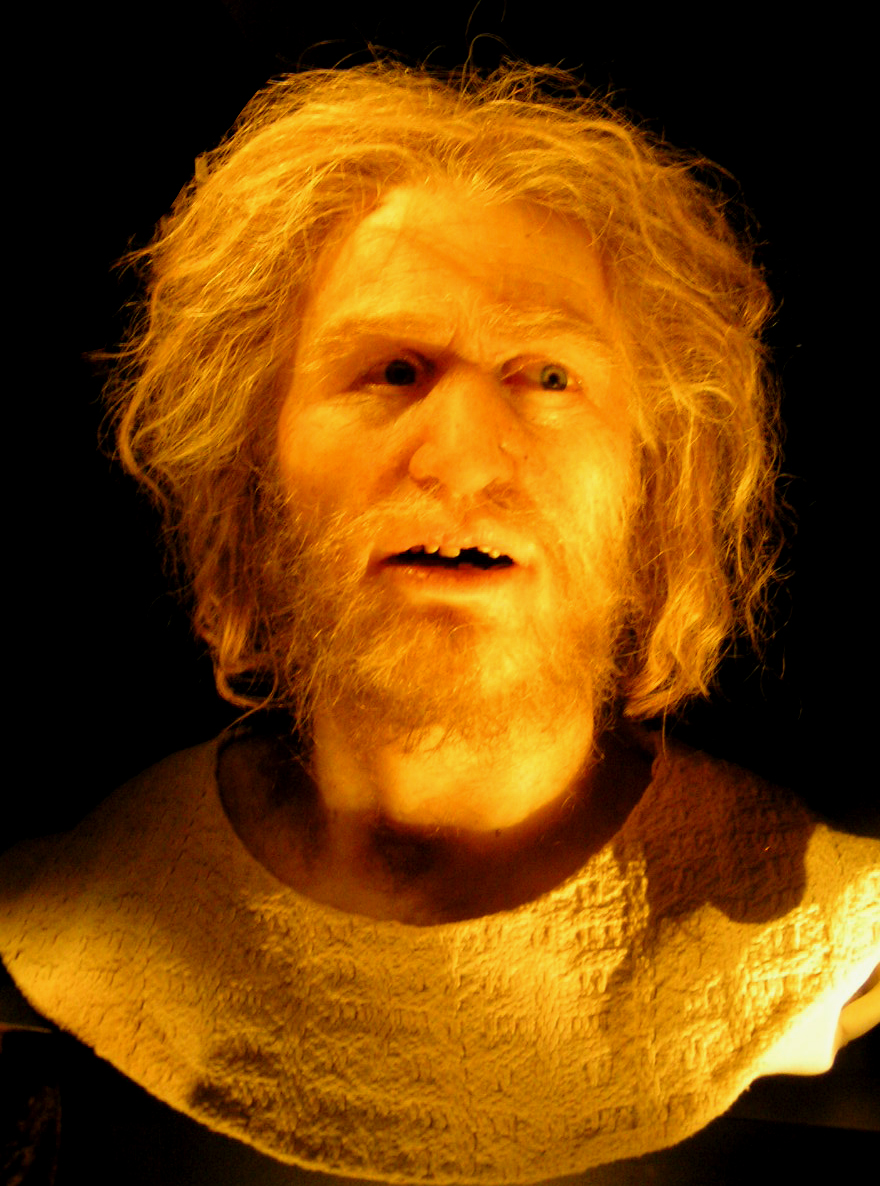
- Reconstruction of head from skull ascribed to Störtebeker
- Born: assumed 1360; Unknown
- Died: Assumed 20 October 1401 (aged 40–41); Assumed Hamburg
- Cause of death: Execution by beheading
- Other name: Storzenbecher
- Occupations: Merchant, privateer, violent entrepreneur
- Years active: Assumed 1392–1401

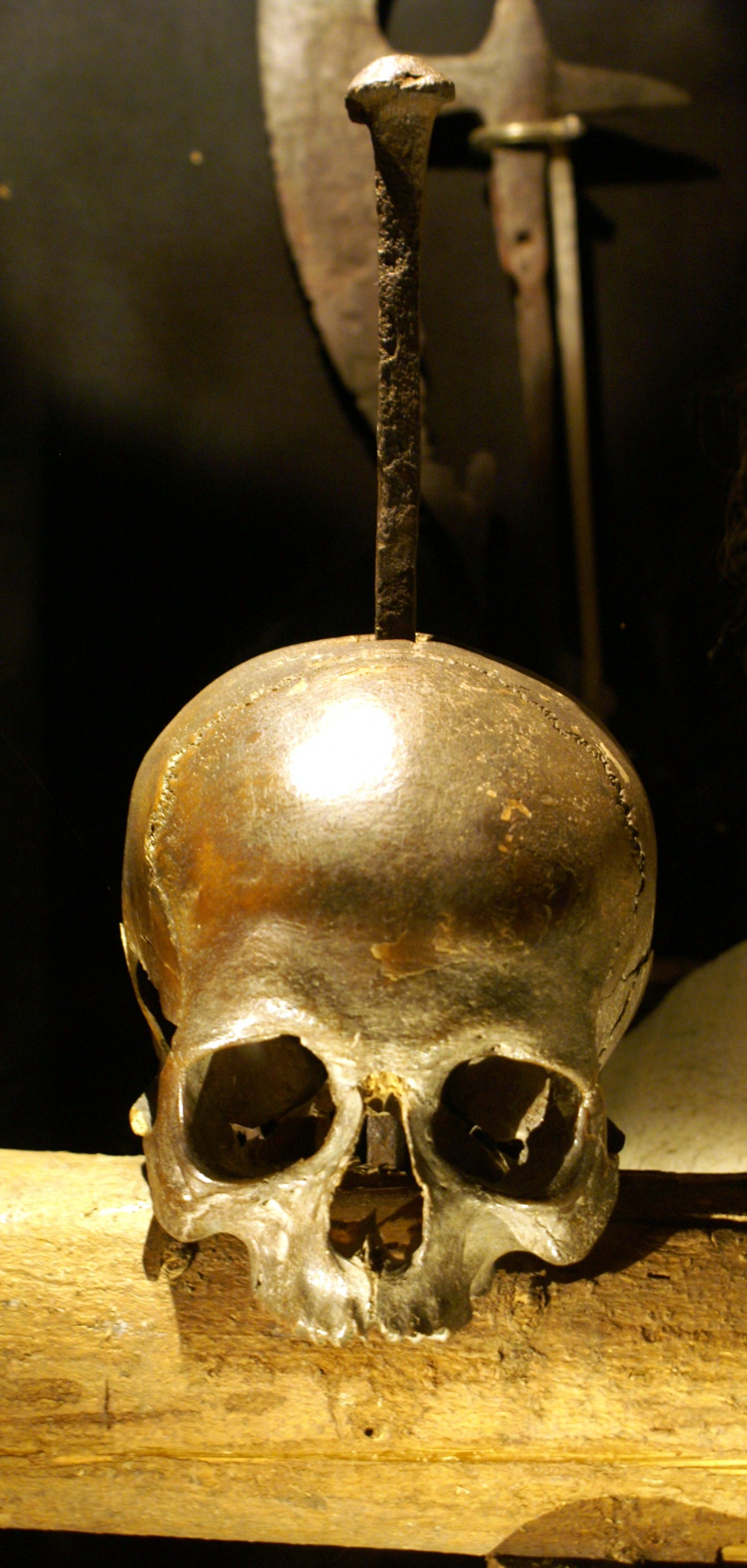
Skull ascribed to Störtebeker, found in 1878

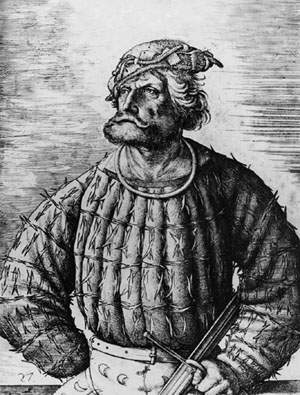
Portrait (Etching) of Kunz von der Rosen the court jester of emperor Maximilian I by Daniel Hopfer, which is often erroneously identified as a portrait of Klaus Störtebeker

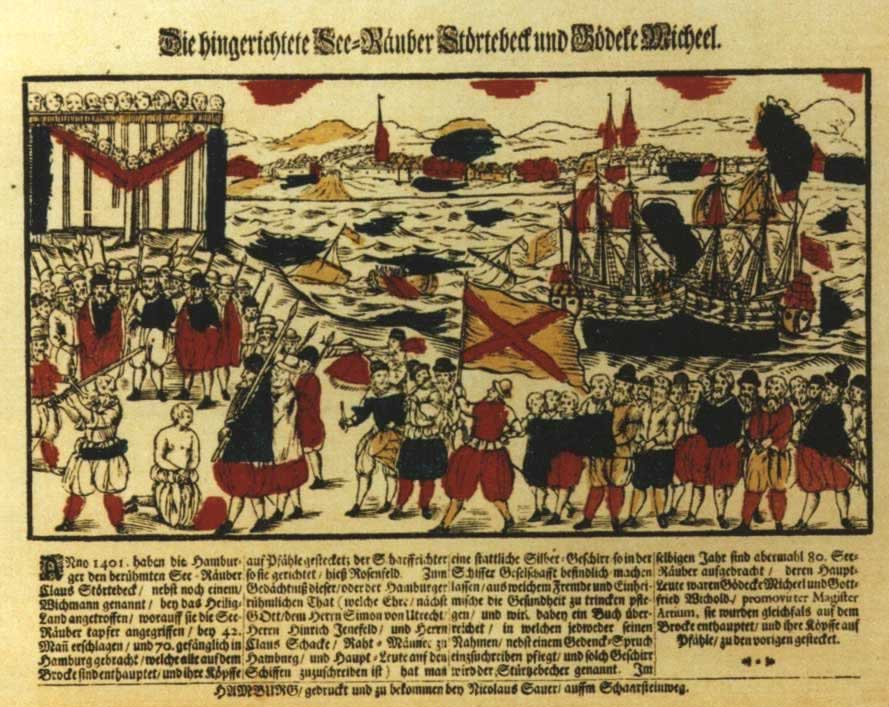
The summary execution of Störtebeker, 1401; tinted woodcut tby Nicolaus Sauer, Hamburg, 1701 (Hamburger Staatsarchiv)

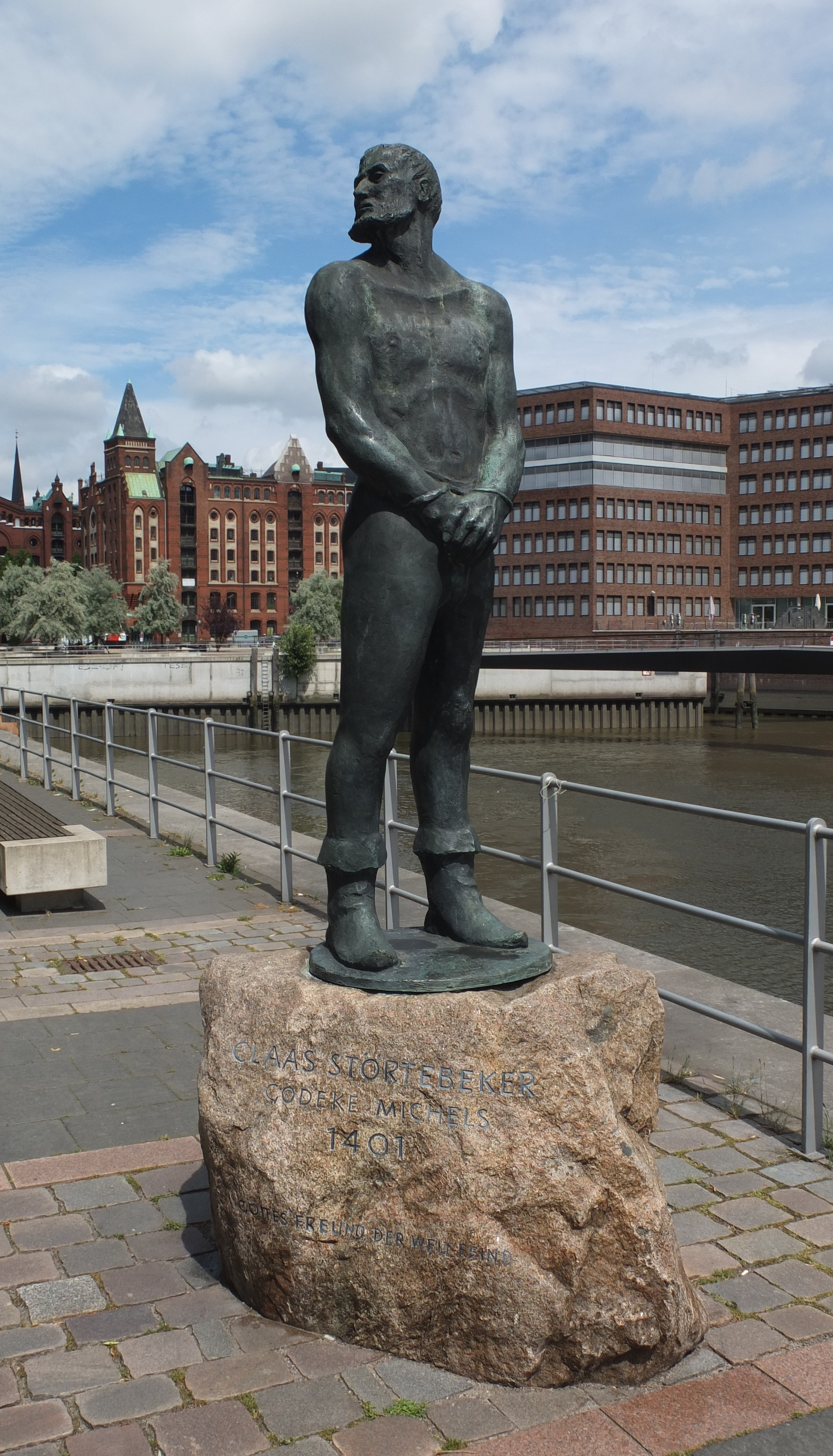
Störtebeker memorial in Hamburg

Klaus Störtebeker (also known as Klaas Störtebecker, Johann Störtebecker or Nikolaus Storzenbecher) (circa 1360 – supposed 20 October 1401) was a German pirate. He was reputed to be the leader of the Victual Brothers (German: Vitalienbrüder), his group was hired to assist in a war between Sweden and Denmark and continued to capture merchant vessels mainly in the Baltic Sea and North Sea. Sharing their spoils equally, they named themselves "Likedeelers" (lit. 'equal sharers').

Within German folklore, Störtebecker is a legendary figure similar to Robin Hood, stealing from the rich to help the poor, and amassing and hiding great treasure. His reputed feats border the supernatural, such as allegedly walking past his crew after being beheaded.

== Biography ==
A large number of myths and legends surround the few facts known about Störtebeker's life. His name is both a nickname and a surname, meaning 'empty the mug with one gulp' in Low German. The moniker refers to the pirate's supposed ability to empty a 4-litre (1.1 US gal) mug of beer in one gulp. At this time, pirates and other fugitives from the law often adopted a colourful nom de guerre.

Störtebeker entered public consciousness around 1398, after the expulsion of the Victual Brothers from the Baltic Sea island of Gotland, where they had set up a stronghold and headquarters in the town of Visby. During the following years, Störtebeker and some of his fellow captains (the most famous of whom were Gödeke Michels, Hennig Wichmann and Magister Wigbold) captured Hanseatic ships, irrespective of their origin.

Störtebeker had a stronghold in Marienhafe, East Frisia, dating from about 1396. He married a daughter of the East Frisian chieftain Keno ten Broke (c. 1310–1376). A tower bearing his name (Störtebekerturm) still exists at the Evangelical Lutheran Marienkirche in Marienhafe.

== Legend ==
According to legend, in 1401, a Hamburgian fleet led by Simon of Utrecht caught up with Störtebeker's force near Heligoland. According to some stories, Störtebeker's ship had been disabled by a traitor who cast molten lead into the links of the chain which controlled the ship's rudder. Störtebeker and his crew were captured and brought to Hamburg, where they were tried for piracy. Legend says that Störtebeker offered a chain of gold long enough to enclose the whole of Hamburg in exchange for his life and freedom. However, Störtebeker and all of his 73 companions were sentenced to death and were beheaded on the Grasbrook. The most famous legend of Störtebeker relates to the execution itself. Störtebeker is said to have asked the mayor of Hamburg to release as many of his companions as he could walk past after being beheaded. Following the granting of this request and the subsequent beheading, Störtebeker's body arose and walked past eleven of his men before the executioner tripped him with an outstretched foot. Nevertheless, the eleven men were executed along with the others. The senate of Hamburg asked the executioner if he was not tired after all this, but he replied he could easily execute the whole of the senate as well. For this, he himself was sentenced to death and executed by the youngest member of the senate.

According to other legends, when Störtebeker's ship was found, the masts contained metal cores (one of gold, one of silver, and one of copper). This was used to create the tip of St. Catherine's church in Hamburg. His famous drinking cup was stored in the town hall of Hamburg, until it was destroyed in the great fire of 1842.

Recent events have suggested it is more likely that Störtebeker and his crew died in 1400. A bill for digging graves for 30 Victual Brothers dated to this year survives in the Hamburg records. This would also suggest the story that Störtebeker was sentenced to death with 70 other privateers is at least misleading; at minimum, he certainly was buried with 30 other men. The year 1400 also excludes the involvement of Simon of Utrecht and the ship Bunte Kuh ('colourful cow'), since the records show the ship was not completed until 1401. In fact, the Hanseatic fleet that attacked Störtebeker was commanded by Hermann Langhe (also Lange) and Nikolaus Schoke (Nicoalus Schocke), who set sail for Heligoland in August 1400, and the course of the battle is not described by any reliable sources.

== Appearance ==
No authentic portrait of Störtebeker is known. An etching made by fifteenth century German artist Daniel Hopfer, often erroneously identified as a portrait of Klaus Störtebeker, is actually of Kunz von der Rosen (1470–1519), court jester of Emperor Maximilian I. However, a tentative reconstruction of Störtebeker's appearance has been made using a skull alleged to be his. This skull, displayed at the Museum for Hamburg History since 1922, was stolen in January 2010 and found by the police in March 2011.

== Memorials and legacy ==
- Statues depicting him stand in a number of Northern German cities, including Hamburg, Verden an der Aller and Marienhafe.
- Störtebeker Festival (Störtebeker Festspiele) is an open-air theatre event, held annually in the town of Ralswiek on the isle of Rügen.
- The term Störtebekerland has been adopted to promote tourism in East Frisia.

=== Novels, TV, and beer ===
Störtebeker is mentioned in several Apothecer Melchior books by Estonian writer Indrek Hargla.

Stortebeker is the name of the leader of the youth gang The Dusters in the novel The Tin Drum by Gunter Grass.

The character of Klaus Störtebeker has appeared in various recent publications including Die Vitalienbrüder: Ein Störtebeker Roman, a German language novel by Willi Bredel (Hinstorff Verlag, 1996, ISBN 978-3-356-00658-2).

Störtebeker was portrayed on television by Ken Duken in Störtebeker, a 2006 miniseries. He was also the subject of a 2007 documentary and of the feature-length movie 12 Paces Without a Head, in the making in 2008.

The German brewery Störtebeker Braumanufaktur chose their name as a homage to Störtebeker.

== Other sources ==
- Bents, Harm (2003). Störtebeker. Dichtung und Wahrheit [Störtebeker: fiction and truth] (in German). SKN Druck und Verlag Norden. ISBN 978-3-928327-69-5.
- Herrmann, Bernd (2005). "Review: Klaus Störtebeker. Ein Mythos wird entschlüsselt by R. Wiechmann, G. Bräuer and K. Püschel". Anthropologischer Anzeiger. 63 (2): 239. JSTOR 29542662.
- Lornsen, Boy (2005). Klaus Störtebeker: Gottes Freund und aller Welt Feind [Klaus Störtebeker: Friend of God and enemy of the world] (in German). Carlsen Verlag GmbH. ISBN 978-3-551-35447-1.
- Puhle, Matthias (1992). Die Vitalienbruder: Klaus Stortebeker und die Seeräuber der Hansezeit [The Victual Brothers: Klaus Störtebeker and the pirates of the Hanseatic period] (in German). Campus Verlag. ISBN 978-3-593-34525-3.
- Püschel, Klaus; Wiechmann, Ralf; Bräuer, Günter, eds. (2003). Klaus Störtebeker: Ein Mythos wird entschlüsselt [Klaus Störtebeker: A legend deciphered] (in German). Munich: Wilhelm Fink. ISBN 978-3-7705-3837-9. Reviewed in Herrmann (2005).
