= Gottfried Michaelsen =

German pirate (died 1402)

- Born: c. 1360; Wismar, Hanseatic League, present-day Wismar, Germany
- Died: 1400 or 20 October 1401 (age 40-41); Hamburg, Hanseatic League, Holy Roman Empire, present-day Hamburg, Germany
- Cause of death: execution by beheading with sword
- Other name: Gödeke Michels
- Occupations: privateer, pirate, privateer ship captain, privateer fleet commander
- Spouse: 1
- Relatives: 1 brother
- Military career
- Allegiance: Sweden (Kingdom) Dukes of Mecklenburg Victual Brothers Hennig Wichmann Magister Wigbold
- Branch: independent naval privateers (allies of Kingdom of Denmark)
- Rank: Captain
- Commands: Victual Brothers privateer fleet
- Conflicts: Denmark-Sweden War Hanseatic League Wars

Gödeke Michels (Low Saxon; died 1402), also known as Gottfried Michaelsen in High German, was a German pirate and one of the leaders of the Likedeeler, a combination of former Vitalienbrüder.

== Career ==
Together with Klaus Störtebeker, Hennig Wichmann and Magister Wigbold, as well as other leaders of the Likedeeler, he raided shipping in the North and Baltic Sea near the end of the 14th century.

They possessed fast ships, which easily outmaneuvered the ships of the Hanse. Like many of the Likedeeler, Michels was primarily concerned with capturing valuable prizes. However, he disdained cowardice and those surviving crewmen who had not resisted were usually thrown overboard.

== Death ==
Gottfried Michaelsen was eventually captured and executed in the year 1402, shortly after Klaus Störtebeker and crewmen were allegedly beheaded on the Grasbrook in Hamburg.
