= Veddel =

- Quarter of Hamburg
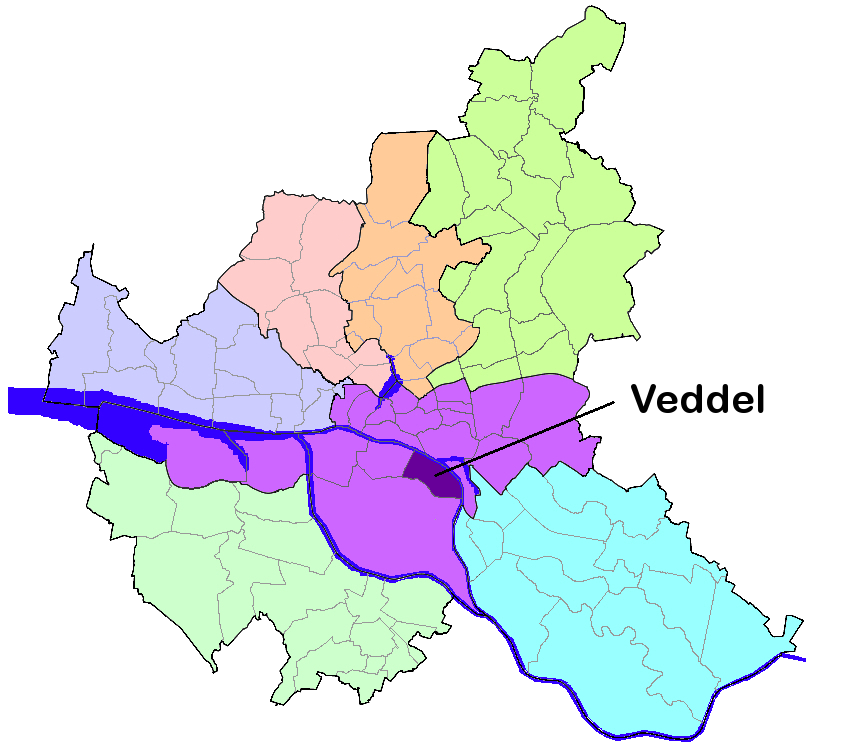
- Location of Veddel in Hamburg
- Interactive map of Veddel
- Location within Germany Location within Hamburg
- Coordinates: 53°31′N 10°2′E
- Country: Germany
- State: Hamburg
- City: Hamburg
- Borough: Hamburg-Mitte

Area
  - Total: 4.4 km^{2} (1.7 sq mi)

Population (2024-12-31)
  - Total: 4,328
  - Density: 980/km^{2} (2,500/sq mi)
- Time zone: UTC+01:00 (CET)
  - Summer (DST): UTC+02:00 (CEST)
- Dialling codes: 040
- Vehicle registration: HH

Veddel (German pronunciation: [ˈfɛdl̩]) is a quarter (Stadtteil) in the Hamburg-Mitte borough of the Free and Hanseatic City of Hamburg on the homonymous island in the Elbe river, in northern Germany. In 2020, the population was 4,356.

== Geography ==
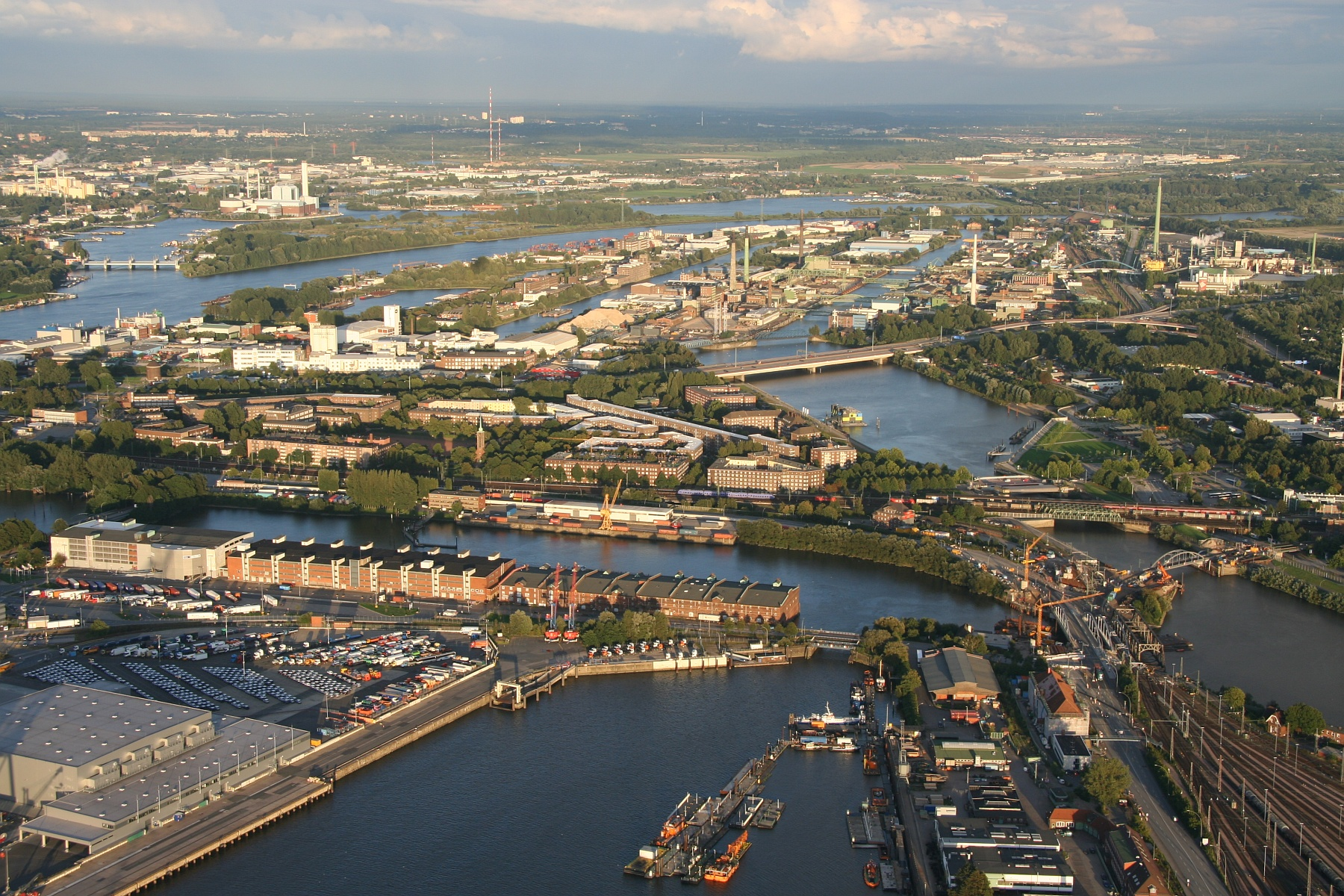
Aerial view of Veddel, seen towards the east across Saalehafen.

Veddel has an area of 4.4 km^{2} (1.7 sq mi).

== Demographics ==
In 2006 in the Veddel quarter were living 4,944 people. The population density was 1,136/km^{2} (2,942/sq mi). 22% were children under the age of 18, and 7.5% were 65 years of age or older. Resident aliens were 51.1% of the population. 407 people were registered as unemployed.

In 1999 there were 2,106 households, out of which 30.5% had children under the age of 18 living with them and 40.9% of all households were made up of individuals. The average household size was 2.25.

== Notes ==
=== References ===
- Selectable database: Statistical office Hamburg and Schleswig-Holstein Statistisches Amt für Hamburg und Schleswig-Holstein. (in German)
