= Adolph IX of Holstein-Kiel =

German noble

Adolph IX, Count of Holstein-Kiel
- Born: c. 1327
- Died: 26 January 1390
- Noble family: House of Schauenburg
- Spouse: Anna of Mecklenburg-Schwerin
- Father: John III, Count of Holstein-Plön
- Mother: Catherine of Glogów

Adolph IX, Count of Holstein-Kiel, also known as Adolph VII, (c. 1327 – 26 January 1390) was count of Holstein-Kiel and Holstein-Plön from 1359 until his death.

== Life ==
His parents were John III "the Mild" (c. 1297 – 27 September 1359) and Catherine (died 1327), the daughter of Duke Henry III of Glogów and the widow of Margrave John V of Brandenburg (1302–1317). In December 1362, Adolph IX married Anna of Mecklenburg-Schwerin (1343–1415), the daughter of Albert II, Duke of Mecklenburg.

Adolph's reign was mostly peaceful. In 1375, Prince-Archbishop Albert II of Bremen mortgaged the Haseldorf Marsh to him. The prince-archbishop of Bremen later failed to redeem the mortgage, and the Haseldorf Marsh has been part of Holstein ever since.

Adolph IX died without an heir on 26 January 1390. After his death, Count Nicholas of Holstein-Rendsburg and his nephews occupied Holstein-Kiel and Holstein-Plön. The Counts of the Holstein-Pinneberg branch of the House of Schauenburg objected and demanded a share of the inheritance. The dispute was settled amicably, with the counts in Pinneberg receiving monetary compensation, plus the district of Nienland (consisting of Neuland and the Lordship of Herzhorn) and some land along the Elbe. The Counts of Holstein-Rendsburg and Holstein-Pinneburg also concluded a treaty of mutual inheritance: if one line were to die out, the other would inherit all their possessions and hereditary fiefs.

== Ancestors ==
Ancestors of Adolph IX of Holstein-Kiel

16. Adolf IV, Count of Holstein
8. Gerhard I, Count of Holstein-Itzehoe
17. Heilwig of Lippe
4. Gerhard II, Count of Holstein-Plön
18. John I, Lord of Mecklenburg
9. Elisabeth of Mecklenburg
19. Luitgard of Henneberg
2. John III, Count of Holstein-Plön
20. Albert II, Margrave of Brandenburg
10. John I, Margrave of Brandenburg
21. Mathilde of Landsberg
5. Agnes of Brandenburg; Queen of Denmark
22. Albert I, Duke of Saxony
11. Bridget (Jutta) of Saxony
23. Agnes of Thuringia and Meissen
1. Adolphus IX (VII) of Holstein-Kiel
24. Henry II the Pious
12. Conrad I, Duke of Silesia-Glogau
25. Anne of Bohemia
6. Henry III, Duke of Silesia-Glogau
26. Władysław Odonic
13. Salome of Greater Poland
27. Jadwiga
3. Catherine of Silesia-Glogau
28. Otto I, Duke of Brunswick-Lüneburg
14. Albert I, Duke of Brunswick-Lüneburg
29. Matilda of Brandenburg
7. Matilda of Brunswick-Lüneburg
30. Boniface II, Marquess of Montferrat
15. Alessia of Montferrat
31. Margaret of Savoy

== Footnotes ==
Adolph IX of Holstein-Kiel House of Schauenburg Born: c. 1327 Died: 26 January 1390
Preceded by John III	Count of Holstein-Kiel; 1359–1390	Succeeded by Nicholas, Albert II and Gerhard VI as Counts of Holstein-Rendsburg
