= Counts of Schauenburg and Holstein =

German noble family

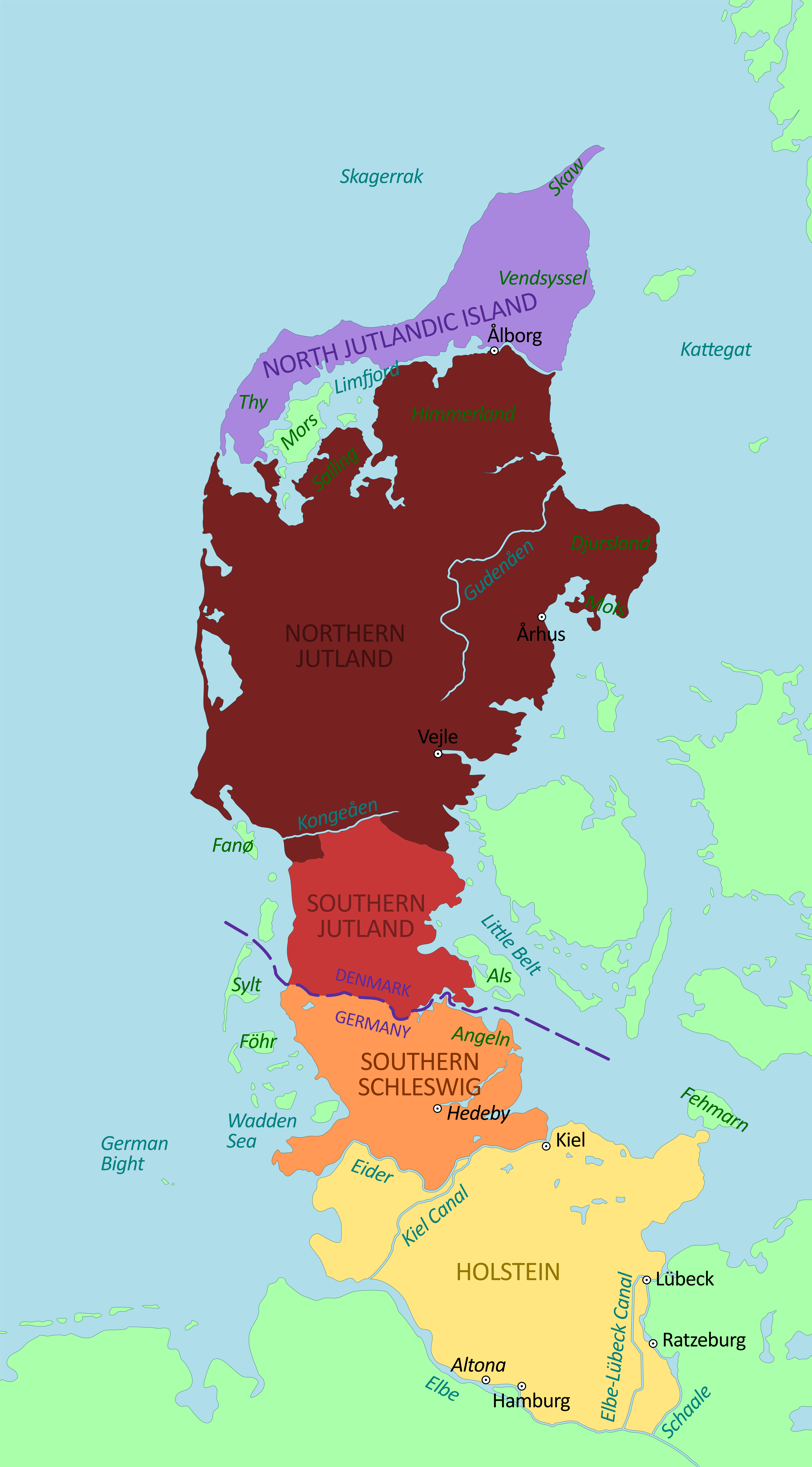
Jutland and Northernmost Germany showing Schleswig and Holstein in today's German Federal State of Schleswig-Holstein.

The Counts of Schauenburg and Holstein were titles of the Holy Roman Empire. The dynastic family came from the County of Schauenburg near Rinteln (district Schaumburg) on the Weser in Germany. Together with its ancestral possessions in Bückeburg and Stadthagen, the House of Schauenburg ruled the County of Schauenburg and the County of Holstein. The comital titles of Holstein were subject to the liege lord, the Dukes of undivided Saxony until 1296, and thereafter the Dukes of Saxe-Lauenburg.

== The counties of Schauenburg and Holstein ==
The County of Schaumburg originated as a medieval county, which was founded at the beginning of the 12th century. It was named after Schauenburg Castle, near Rinteln on the Weser, where the owners started calling themselves Lords (from 1295 Counts) of Schauenburg. Adolf I probably became the first Lord of Schauenburg in 1106. In 1110, Adolf I, Lord of Schauenburg was appointed by Lothair, Duke of Saxony to hold Holstein and Stormarn, including Hamburg, as fiefs.

In a battle with Denmark, however, Adolf III became prisoner of the king Valdemar II, to whom he had to give Holstein in exchange for his freedom. In 1227 Adolf III's son, Adolf IV, recovered the lost lands from Denmark. Subsequently, the House of Schaumburg were also counts of Holstein and its partitions Holstein-Itzehoe, Holstein-Kiel, Holstein-Pinneberg (till 1640), Holstein-Plön, Holstein-Segeberg and Holstein-Rendsburg (till 1460) and through the latter at times also the dukes of Schleswig.

=== Partitions of Holstein ===
==== Holstein partitions of 1261 and 1273 ====
After 1261 the previously jointly ruling brothers Gerhard I and the elder John I divided the Counties of Holstein and Schauenburg (Schaumburg). Gerhard I received the Counties of Holstein-Itzehoe and Schaumburg, whereas John received the County of Holstein-Kiel. After the death of John I, his sons Adolphus V and John II reigned jointly in Holstein-Kiel. In 1273 they partitioned Holstein-Kiel and John II continued ruling over Kiel; Adolphus V the Pomeranian then received Segeberg (aka County of Stormarn). After the death of Adolphus V, Holstein-Segeberg was reincorporated into Holstein-Kiel.

==== Holstein partition of 1290 and reversions of 1350 and 1390 ====
After Gerhard I's death in 1290 his three younger sons partitioned Holstein-Itzehoe and Schaumburg into three branches, with Adolph VI the Elder, the third brother, getting Holstein-Pinneberg and Schaumburg south of the Elbe, the second brother Gerhard II the Blind getting Holstein-Plön, and the fourth Henry I receiving Holstein-Rendsburg. The eldest brother John was Canon at the Hamburg Cathedral.

After the death of Gerhard II his sons Gerhard IV and his younger half-brother John III the Mild inherited and ruled in Holstein-Plön together. In 1316 the brothers militarily seized the possessions of John II the One-Eyed (d. 1321) in Holstein-Kiel, whose sons had been killed. John III the Mild, before a second-born co-ruling count in Plön, then received Kiel from the deposed John II the One-Eyed, a cousin of his father Gerhard II the Blind. Gerhard IV continued ruling Holstein-Plön as sole count.

After the death of John III's nephew Gerhard V, Count of Holstein-Plön in 1350, who had succeeded Gerhard IV, the Plön line became extinct and John III re-inherited their possessions. In 1390 his son Adolphus IX (aka VII) ruling since 1359 Kiel including Plön, died without issue and thus Nicholas (Claus) of Holstein-Rendsburg and his nephews Albert II and Gerhard VI (jointly ruling till 1397) succeeded to the territories of Holstein-Kiel and Holstein-Plön.

==== Holstein partition of 1397 and the extinction of the Rendsburg line in 1459 ====
In 1390 the Holstein-Rendsburg line had assembled the larger part of the partitioned Holstein counties, to wit Kiel, Plön and Segeberg, but not Holstein-Pinneberg, which existed until 1640. Members of the Rendsburg family branch were often also simply titled as Counts of Holstein after 1390. For the Pinneberg family branch, usually residing in the County of Schaumburg, the titling after Schaumburg started to prevail.

In 1397 after the death of their uncle Nicholas (Claus), with whom the nephews Albert II and the elder Gerhard VI had jointly ruled Holstein-Rendsburg, they partitioned Holstein-Segeberg (aka county of Stormarn) from Holstein-Rendsburg, with Albert receiving the new branch county in return for waiving his co-rule in Rendsburg. After Albert's death in 1403 Segeberg reverted to Rendsberg. In 1459, with the death of Adolphus XI (aka VIII), the Rendsburg branch was extinct in the male line and the nobility of Holstein-Rendburg and of Schleswig then assigned the succession to his sister's son King Christian I of Denmark, House of Oldenburg.

==== The last Schauenburg line ruling Schaumburg and Holstein-Pinneberg till 1640 ====
After King Christian I of Denmark, House of Oldenburg had been chosen as heir to the County of Holstein-Rendsburg Christian ascended to the comital throne in 1460. In 1474 Frederick III, Holy Roman Emperor, elevated Christian I from Count of Holstein-Rendsburg to Duke of Holstein. For his succession in the Duchy of Holstein see List of rulers of Schleswig-Holstein#House of Oldenburg (1460–1544). The Schauenburg line in the Counties of Holstein-Pinneberg and Schaumburg persisted until its extinction in the male line in 1640. This line is also known as Holstein-Schauenburg. The Counts were elevated to Princes of Schaumburg in 1619/1620, however, the Dukes of Holstein opposed the transition of that title to the County of Holstein-Pinneberg.

==== Schaumburg partition of 1640 ====
After the death in 1640 of Count Otto V without children, the rule of the House of Schaumburg ended in Holstein. The County of Holstein-Pinneberg was merged under Christian IV with his royal share in the Duchy of Holstein, which is now part of the state of Schleswig-Holstein. For Christian IV and his successors see List of rulers of Schleswig-Holstein#House of Oldenburg (1640–1713)

The Principality of Schaumburg proper, however, was partitioned among the agnatic Schauenburg heirs into three parts, one incorporated into the Principality of Lüneburg of the Duchy of Brunswick and Lüneburg, the second becoming the County of Schaumburg-Lippe and the third continuing the name County of Schaumburg, ruled in personal union by Hesse-Cassel. All the three are now part of the state of Lower Saxony. The Sovereign Lordship of Gemen, in 1531 acquired for Schaumburg through marriage by Jobst I, and ruled by his second-born son of Jobst II (ca. 1520–1581, regnant since 1531), passed on to the family of Limburg Stirum. Gemen is in today's North Rhine-Westphalia.

=== House of Schauenburg ===
==== Partitions of Holstein and Schauenburg under Schauenburg rule ====
Counties of Holstein and Schauenburg (1110–1261)
County of Itzehoe (with Schauenburg) (1261–1290)
County of Segeberg (1st creation) (1273–1315)
Renamed; County of Plön (1290–1350)	County of Pinneberg (with Schauenburg) (1290–1640)
County of Kiel (1261–1390)
County of Segeberg (2nd creation) (1397–1403)	County of Rendsburg (1290–1459) (with Duchy of Schleswig in 1325–30 and 1375–1433)
Annexed by Denmark, forming the Duchy of Holstein
County of Gemen (1531-1622)
Annexed to the Duchy of Holstein

==== Table of rulers ====
Ruler	Born	Reign	Ruling part	Consort	Death	Notes
Adolph I	c.1090? Son of Adolf?	1106 – 13 November 1130	County of Schauenburg (with Holstein since 1110)	Hildewa before 1128 four children	13 November 1130 aged 39-40?	First count of Schauenburg, in 1110 becomes count of Holstein.
Regency of Hildewa (1128-1142)						Between 1137 and 1143, Holstein fell under the control of Henry of Badewide, who married a relative of the King of Denmark. However, Adolph and his mother kept Schauenburg and made great efforts to recover Holstein, as much as, by 1139, Henry's domain was already restricted to Wagria.
Adolph II	c.1128 Son of Adolph I and Hildewa	13 November 1130 – 6 July 1164	County of Schauenburg (with Holstein)	Matilda of Schwarzburg-Käfernburg c.1155 one child	6 July 1164; Verchen aged 35-36	Between 1137 and 1143, Holstein fell under the control of Henry of Badewide, who married a relative of the King of Denmark. However, Adolph and his mother kept Schauenburg and made great efforts to recover Holstein, as much as, by 1139, Henry's domain was already restricted to Wagria.
Regency of Matilda of Schwarzburg-Käfernburg (1164-1174)						Count of Schauenburg and Holstein, ceded Holstein to Denmark in 1203 in order to be released from captivity. In 1208 Holstein passed to the Count of Weimar-Orlamünde, Albert I, who held residence at Stormarn. In 1227, Albert would be defeated by Adolph III's son, Adolph IV.
Adolph III	1160; Son of Adolph II and Matilda of Schwarzburg-Käfernburg	6 July 1164 – 3 January 1225	County of Schauenburg (with Holstein until 1203)	Adelaide of Assel; 1182 no children Adelaide of Querfurt; Before 10 May 1189 four children	3 January 1225 aged 64-65	Count of Schauenburg and Holstein, ceded Holstein to Denmark in 1203 in order to be released from captivity. In 1208 Holstein passed to the Count of Weimar-Orlamünde, Albert I, who held residence at Stormarn. In 1227, Albert would be defeated by Adolph III's son, Adolph IV.
Adolph IV	c.1200 Son of Adolph III and Adelaide of Querfurt	3 January 1225 – 1238	County of Schauenburg (with Holstein from 1227)	Heilwig of Lippe (I); 1223 four children	8 July 1261; Kiel aged	Count of Holstein by military victory over Valdemar II; In fulfilment of an oath taken before this same victory, Adolph withdrew in 1238 to a Franciscan friary and in 1244 was ordained a priest in Rome.
Regency of Heilwig of Lippe (I) and Abel of Denmark (1238-1243)						Children of Adolph IV. John and Gerhard ruled jointly on their first years of rule, under regency. They had to wait their abdicated father's death, because only that would explain their late division of the inheritance. After Gerhard's death in 1290 his sons partitioned Holstein-Itzehoe and Schaumburg into three branches. Matilda received property in Schleswig that she left to her brothers after her death.
John I	1229; First son of Adolph IV and Heilwig of Lippe (I)	1238 – 20 April 1263	County of Kiel (co-rulership in Schauenburg-Holstein until 1261)	Elisabeth of Saxe-Wittenberg; 1249 or 1250 four children	20 April 1263 aged 33-34	Children of Adolph IV. John and Gerhard ruled jointly on their first years of rule, under regency. They had to wait their abdicated father's death, because only that would explain their late division of the inheritance. After Gerhard's death in 1290 his sons partitioned Holstein-Itzehoe and Schaumburg into three branches. Matilda received property in Schleswig that she left to her brothers after her death.
Gerhard I	1232; Second son of Adolph IV and Heilwig of Lippe (I)	1238 – 21 December 1290	County of Itzehoe (co-rulership in Schauenburg-Holstein until 1261)	Elisabeth of Mecklenburg; 1250 eleven children Alexia of Montferrat; 1282 no children	21 December 1290 aged 57-58	Children of Adolph IV. John and Gerhard ruled jointly on their first years of rule, under regency. They had to wait their abdicated father's death, because only that would explain their late division of the inheritance. After Gerhard's death in 1290 his sons partitioned Holstein-Itzehoe and Schaumburg into three branches. Matilda received property in Schleswig that she left to her brothers after her death.
Matilda	c.1220 Daughter of Adolph IV and Heilwig of Lippe (I)	1238 – 1288	County of Holstein (at Stapelholm, Fræzlæt and Swania)	Abel of Denmark; 25 April 1237 four children Birger Jarl; 1261br/>no children	1288; Kiel aged 57-58	Children of Adolph IV. John and Gerhard ruled jointly on their first years of rule, under regency. They had to wait their abdicated father's death, because only that would explain their late division of the inheritance. After Gerhard's death in 1290 his sons partitioned Holstein-Itzehoe and Schaumburg into three branches. Matilda received property in Schleswig that she left to her brothers after her death.
Regency of Elisabeth of Saxe-Wittenberg (1263-1267)						Sons of John I, divided officially their inheritance in 1273. After Adolph V's death without descendants, Segeberg went to a son of John I. In 1316, John II was deposed in a coup led by his cousin John III, from Plön.
Adolph V the Pomeranian	1252; First son of John I and Elisabeth of Saxe-Wittenberg	20 April 1263 – 11 November 1308	County of Segeberg	Euphemia of Pomerania-Wolgast; 1273 or 1278 one child	11 November 1308 aged 55-56	Sons of John I, divided officially their inheritance in 1273. After Adolph V's death without descendants, Segeberg went to a son of John I. In 1316, John II was deposed in a coup led by his cousin John III, from Plön.
John II the One-Eyed	1253; Second son of John I and Elisabeth of Saxe-Wittenberg	20 April 1263 – 1316	County of Kiel	Margareta of Denmark; 1276 two children	1321 aged 67-68	Sons of John I, divided officially their inheritance in 1273. After Adolph V's death without descendants, Segeberg went to a son of John I. In 1316, John II was deposed in a coup led by his cousin John III, from Plön.
Gerhard II the Blind	1254; First son of Gerhard I and Elisabeth of Mecklenburg	21 December 1290 – 28 October 1312	County of Itzehoe, renamed County of Plön	Ingeborg of Sweden; 12 December 1275 four children Agnes of Brandenburg; 1293 one child	28 October 1312 aged 57-58	Children of Gerhard I, divided the land. Gerhard II received his father's capital at Itzehoe, but changed it to Plön, while Adolph VI received, with his portion at Pinneberg, the original Schauenburg. Henry I, the younger son, received a portion of the inheritance in Rendsburg.
Adolph VI the Elder	1256; Second son of Gerhard I and Elisabeth of Mecklenburg	21 December 1290 – 13 May 1315	County of Pinneberg (with Schauenburg)	Helen of Saxe-Lauenburg; 14 February 1294 seven children	13 May 1315 aged 58-59	Children of Gerhard I, divided the land. Gerhard II received his father's capital at Itzehoe, but changed it to Plön, while Adolph VI received, with his portion at Pinneberg, the original Schauenburg. Henry I, the younger son, received a portion of the inheritance in Rendsburg.
Henry I	1258; Third son of Gerhard I and Elisabeth of Mecklenburg	21 December 1290 – 5 August 1304	County of Rendsburg	Heilwig of Bronckhorst; 1289 four children	5 August 1304 aged 45-46	Children of Gerhard I, divided the land. Gerhard II received his father's capital at Itzehoe, but changed it to Plön, while Adolph VI received, with his portion at Pinneberg, the original Schauenburg. Henry I, the younger son, received a portion of the inheritance in Rendsburg.
Regency of Heilwig of Bronckhorst (1304-1306)						Profited from the minority of the duke of Schleswig to take over the duchy to himself, but handed it over in 1330. However, his career and profit rose up to the point where he can be called the de facto ruler of Denmark during the Interregnum of 1332-40.
Gerhard III the Great	1292; Son of Henry I and Heilwig of Bronckhorst	5 August 1304 – 1 April 1340	County of Rendsburg (with Schleswig 1326-1330, and major Denmark 1332-1340)	Sophia of Werle; 1315 four children	1 April 1340; Randers aged 47-48	Profited from the minority of the duke of Schleswig to take over the duchy to himself, but handed it over in 1330. However, his career and profit rose up to the point where he can be called the de facto ruler of Denmark during the Interregnum of 1332-40.
Adolph (VII)	c.1276 Son of John II and Margareta of Denmark	11 November 1308 – 1315	County of Segeberg	Luitgard of Mecklenburg; 1315 no children	1315 aged 38-39	Succeeded his uncle Adolph V at Segeberg. Died assassinated and without heirs.
Segeberg re-absorbed in Kiel; in 1316 it was divided between Pinneberg and Rendsburg
Gerhard IV	1277; Son of Gerhard II and Ingeborg of Sweden	28 October 1312 – 1323	County of Plön (from 1314 only in a small part of the county)	Anastasia of Schwerin; 30 July 1313 two children	1323 aged 45-46	Sons of Gerhard II, ruled jointly. On 7 June 1314 Gerhard sold most of his inheritance part to his brother, who in 1316 also deposed John II of Kiel. Ruling over two main parts of Holstein, John III also served, alongside Gerhard III, as lord ruling in guardianship the Danish Duchy of Schleswig 1332–1340.
John III the Mild	1297; Son of Gerhard II and Agnes of Brandenburg	28 October 1312 – 1316 22 September 1350 – 27 September 1359	County of Plön	Catherine of Głogów; 25 December 1317 or 27 January 1319 three children Miroslawa of Schwerin-Wittenburg; 1327 three children	27 September 1359 aged 61-62	Sons of Gerhard II, ruled jointly. On 7 June 1314 Gerhard sold most of his inheritance part to his brother, who in 1316 also deposed John II of Kiel. Ruling over two main parts of Holstein, John III also served, alongside Gerhard III, as lord ruling in guardianship the Danish Duchy of Schleswig 1332–1340.
John III the Mild	1297; Son of Gerhard II and Agnes of Brandenburg	1316 – 27 September 1359	County of Kiel	Catherine of Głogów; 25 December 1317 or 27 January 1319 three children Miroslawa of Schwerin-Wittenburg; 1327 three children	27 September 1359 aged 61-62	Sons of Gerhard II, ruled jointly. On 7 June 1314 Gerhard sold most of his inheritance part to his brother, who in 1316 also deposed John II of Kiel. Ruling over two main parts of Holstein, John III also served, alongside Gerhard III, as lord ruling in guardianship the Danish Duchy of Schleswig 1332–1340.
Adolph VII	1297; Son of Adolph VI and Helen of Saxe-Lauenburg	13 May 1315 – 9 October 1354	County of Pinneberg (with Schauenburg)	Hedwig of Schwalenberg by 1301 no children Heilwig of Lippe (II); 1322 eight children	9 October 1354 aged 56-57	
Regency of Anastasia of Schwerin (1323-1329)						Ruler of only a small part of Plön, after the sell his father made to his uncle. After his death, the aforementioned uncle reunites effectively the entirety of both Plön and Kiel.
Gerhard V	1315; Son of Gerhard IV and Anastasia of Schwerin	1323 – 22 September 1350	County of Plön	Unmarried	22 September 1350 aged 34-35	Ruler of only a small part of Plön, after the sell his father made to his uncle. After his death, the aforementioned uncle reunites effectively the entirety of both Plön and Kiel.
Plön definitively annexed to Kiel
Henry II of Iron	1317; First son of Gerhard III and Sophia of Werle	1 April 1340 – 1384	County of Rendsburg (with Schleswig 1375-1386)	Matilda of Lippe one child Ingeborg of Mecklenburg-Schwerin before 1374 four children	1384 aged 66-67	Nicholas and Henry ruled jointly as sons of Gerhard III. In 1375 they inherited the Duchy of Schleswig from the House of Estridsen. In 1384, with the death of his brother, Nicholas associated his nephews (Gerhard and Albert, sons of Henry) to power. In 1386 he abdicated of Schleswig to his older nephew Gerhard, who assumed alone this lands. In 1390 Nicholas inherited Holstein-Kiel. After Nicholas' death in 1397, the co-ruling nephews, Gerhard and Albert, divided the land.
Nicholas I	1321; Second son of Gerhard III and Sophia of Werle	1 April 1340 – 8 May 1397	County of Rendsburg (with Schleswig 1375-1386)	Elisabeth of Brunswick-Lüneburg; 1354 one child	8 May 1397 aged 75-76	Nicholas and Henry ruled jointly as sons of Gerhard III. In 1375 they inherited the Duchy of Schleswig from the House of Estridsen. In 1384, with the death of his brother, Nicholas associated his nephews (Gerhard and Albert, sons of Henry) to power. In 1386 he abdicated of Schleswig to his older nephew Gerhard, who assumed alone this lands. In 1390 Nicholas inherited Holstein-Kiel. After Nicholas' death in 1397, the co-ruling nephews, Gerhard and Albert, divided the land.
Adolph VIII the Younger	c.1325 First son of Adolph VII and Heilwig of Lippe (II)	9 October 1354 – 13 October 1370	County of Pinneberg (with Schauenburg)	Unmarried	13 October 1370; Famagusta aged 44-45	
Adolph IX the Mild	1327; Son of John III and Catherine of Głogów	27 September 1359 – 26 January 1390	County of Kiel	Anne of Mecklenburg-Schwerin; 4 December 1362 or 21 September 1365 no children	26 January 1390 aged 62-63	After his death in 1390 without descendants, Kiel and its patrimony was divided between Holstein-Pinneberg and Holstein-Rendsburg.
Otto I	c.1330 Fourth son of Adolph VII and Heilwig of Lippe (II)	13 October 1370 – 1404	County of Pinneberg (with Schauenburg)	Matilda of Brunswick-Lüneburg; 25 June 1368 ten children	1404	
Gerhard VI	1367; First son of Henry II and Ingeborg of Mecklenburg-Schwerin	8 May 1397 – 5 August 1404	County of Rendsburg (in Schleswig since 1386)	Catherine Elisabeth of Brunswick-Lüneburg; 1390 six children	5 August 1404; Dithmarschen aged 36-37	Co-rulers in Rendsburg with their uncle Nicholas since 1384. After the abdication of Nicholas in Schleswig, Gerhard took over the duchy, and assumed Rendsburg only after the former's death. Gerhard's brother Albert revived in 1397 the duchy of Segeberg, making official the new division, but after his death in 1403, Segeberg merged again in Rendsburg, still in hands of Gerhard, who died in the following year. The brothers also co-ruled with their cousin, Elisabeth, who had received property in Rendsburg.
Albert II	1369; Second son of Henry II and Ingeborg of Mecklenburg-Schwerin	8 May 1397 – 28 September 1403	County of Segeberg	Agnes of Saxe-Lauenburg before 23 March 1399 no children	28 September 1403; Dithmarschen aged 33-34	
Elisabeth	1360; Daughter of Nicholas I and Elisabeth of Brunswick-Lüneburg	8 May 1397 – 25 January 1416	County of Rendsburg (at Åbenrå, Sønder-Rangstrup Herred and Rise Herred)	Albert IV, Duke of Mecklenburg; 1373 no children Eric V, Duke of Saxe-Lauenburg; 1404 no children	25 January 1416; Cammin aged 55-56	
Henry III	c.1372 Third son of Henry II and Ingeborg of Mecklenburg-Schwerin	1404 – February 1421	County of Rendsburg	Unmarried	February 1421 aged 48-49	Also Prince-Bishop of Osnabrück as Henry I (1402–1410), and regent in Schleswig.
Adolph X	1375; Son of Otto I and Matilda of Brunswick-Lüneburg	1404 – 9 October 1426	County of Pinneberg (with Schauenburg)	Helen of Hoya; 1378 three children	9 October 1426 aged 50-51	
Regency of Catherine Elisabeth of Brunswick-Lüneburg and Henry III, Count of Holstein-Rendsburg and Prince-Bishop of Osnabrück (1404–1413), in Schleswig only						Died without descendants. Passed the land to his brothers.
Henry IV	1397; First son of Gerhard VI and Catherine Elisabeth of Brunswick-Lüneburg	February 1421 – 28 May 1427	County of Rendsburg (in Schleswig since 1404)	Unmarried	28 May 1427; Flensburg aged 29-30	Died without descendants. Passed the land to his brothers.
Otto II	1400; Son of Adolph X and Helen of Hoya	9 October 1426 – 2 June 1464	County of Pinneberg (with Schauenburg)	Elisabeth of Hohenstein; 1418 ten children	2 June 1464 aged 63-64	
Adolph XI	1401; Second son of Gerhard VI and Catherine Elisabeth of Brunswick-Lüneburg	28 May 1427 – 4 December 1459	County of Rendsburg (with Schlewig)	Matilda before 1433 no children Margareta of Mansfeld; 1433 no children	4 December 1459; Bad Segeberg aged 57-58	Sons of Gerhard VI, ruled jointly in Holstein-Rendsburg. As Gerhard also wanted to rule in Schleswig he claimed (unsuccessfully) this duchy for himself against his brother. Adolph was the mightiest vassal of Danish crown at his time, gaining royal Danish recognition in 1440. After Adolph's death his patrimony is annexed by Denmark.
Gerhard VII	1404; Third son of Gerhard VI and Catherine Elisabeth of Brunswick-Lüneburg	28 May 1427 – 24 July 1433	County of Rendsburg (with Schlewig)	Agnes of Baden; 2 June 1432; Baden ten children	24 July 1433; Emmerich am Rhein aged 28-29	Sons of Gerhard VI, ruled jointly in Holstein-Rendsburg. As Gerhard also wanted to rule in Schleswig he claimed (unsuccessfully) this duchy for himself against his brother. Adolph was the mightiest vassal of Danish crown at his time, gaining royal Danish recognition in 1440. After Adolph's death his patrimony is annexed by Denmark.
Rendsburg and Schleswig were annexed to Denmark; with the Rendsburg patrimony the Danish formed the Duchy of Holstein
Adolph XII	1419; First son of Otto II and Elisabeth of Hohenstein	2 June 1464 – 9 October 1474	County of Pinneberg (with Schauenburg)	Irmgard of Hoya; 1459 no children	9 October 1474 aged 54-55	Children of Otto II, succeeded each other, and leaving no descendants. John IV, the eighth son, was the one who left a successor.
Eric I	1420; Second son of Otto II and Elisabeth of Hohenstein	9 October 1474 – 25 March 1492	County of Pinneberg (with Schauenburg)	Heba of East Frisia; 1476 no children	25 March 1492 aged 71-72	Children of Otto II, succeeded each other, and leaving no descendants. John IV, the eighth son, was the one who left a successor.
Otto III	1426; Fifth son of Otto II and Elisabeth of Hohenstein	25 March 1492 – 1510	County of Pinneberg (with Schauenburg)	Unmarried	1510 aged 83-84	Children of Otto II, succeeded each other, and leaving no descendants. John IV, the eighth son, was the one who left a successor.
Anton I	1439; Sixth son of Otto II and Elisabeth of Hohenstein	1510 – 22 December 1526	County of Pinneberg (with Schauenburg)	Sophia of Saxe-Lauenburg; 29 November 1492 no children Anna of Schönburg before 25 September 1497 no children	22 December 1526 aged 86-87	Children of Otto II, succeeded each other, and leaving no descendants. John IV, the eighth son, was the one who left a successor.
John IV	1449; Eighth son of Otto II and Elisabeth of Hohenstein	22 December 1526 – 30 March 1527	County of Pinneberg (with Schauenburg)	Cordula of Gehmen; 1482 one child	30 March 1527 aged 77-78	Children of Otto II, succeeded each other, and leaving no descendants. John IV, the eighth son, was the one who left a successor.
Jobst I	1483; Son of John IV and Cordula of Gehmen	30 March 1527 – 5 June 1531	County of Pinneberg (with Schauenburg)	Maria of Nassau-Siegen; 1506 eight children	5 June 1531 aged 47-48	
Adolph XIII	19 January 1511; Second son of Jobst and Maria of Nassau-Siegen	5 June 1531 – 1544	County of Pinneberg (with Schauenburg)	Unmarried	20 September 1556; Brühl aged 45	Children of Jobst, divided their inheritance. The elder brothers ruled jointly in Pinneberg; Jobst II inherited Gemen alone. Adolphus abdicated in 1544, and became Archbishop of Cologne as Adolph III (1547–1556). In 1559 the Reformation officially began in Schauenburg and Holstein-Pinneberg.
John V	1512; Fourth son of Jobst and Maria of Nassau-Siegen	5 June 1531 – 10 January 1560	County of Pinneberg (with Schauenburg)	Elisabeth of East Frisia; 1558 no children	10 January 1560; Bückeburg aged 47-48	Children of Jobst, divided their inheritance. The elder brothers ruled jointly in Pinneberg; Jobst II inherited Gemen alone. Adolphus abdicated in 1544, and became Archbishop of Cologne as Adolph III (1547–1556). In 1559 the Reformation officially began in Schauenburg and Holstein-Pinneberg.
Otto IV	1517; Fifth son of Jobst I and Maria of Nassau-Siegen	5 June 1531 – 21 December 1576	County of Pinneberg (with Schauenburg)	Maria of Pomerania-Stettin before 1545 four children Elisabeth Ursula of Brunswick-Lüneburg; 1558 three children	21 December 1576; Bückeburg aged 58-59	Children of Jobst, divided their inheritance. The elder brothers ruled jointly in Pinneberg; Jobst II inherited Gemen alone. Adolphus abdicated in 1544, and became Archbishop of Cologne as Adolph III (1547–1556). In 1559 the Reformation officially began in Schauenburg and Holstein-Pinneberg.
Jobst II	1520; Seventh son of Jobst I and Maria of Nassau-Siegen	5 June 1531 – 29 May 1581	County of Gemen	Elisabeth of Pallant; 1558 three children	29 May 1581 aged 60-61	Children of Jobst, divided their inheritance. The elder brothers ruled jointly in Pinneberg; Jobst II inherited Gemen alone. Adolphus abdicated in 1544, and became Archbishop of Cologne as Adolph III (1547–1556). In 1559 the Reformation officially began in Schauenburg and Holstein-Pinneberg.
Adolph XIV	27 February 1547; Son of Otto IV and Maria of Pomerania-Stettin	21 December 1576 – 2 July 1601	County of Pinneberg (with Schauenburg)	Elisabeth of Brunswick-Wolfenbüttel; 6 May 1583; Wolfenbüttel one child	2 July 1601; Minden aged 54	
Henry V	21 February 1566; Son of Jobst II and Elisabeth of Pallant	29 May 1581 – 15 October 1597	County of Gemen	Matilda of Limburg-Styrum; 4 August 1592; Styrum one child	15 October 1597 aged 61	
Ernest	24 September 1569; Bückeburg; Son of Otto IV and Elisabeth Ursula of Brunswick-Lüneburg	2 July 1601 – 17 January 1622	County of Pinneberg (with Schauenburg)	Hedwig of Hesse-Kassel; 11 September 1597; Schmalkalden ten children	17 January 1622; Bückeburg aged 52	He was elevated to "Prince of Schaumburg" in 1619.
Jobst Herman	6 October 1593; Borken; Son of Henry V and Matilda of Limburg-Styrum	15 October 1597 – 17 January 1622	County of Gemen	Catherine Sophia of Brunswick-Harburg (1577-1665) no children	5 November 1635; Bückeburg aged 42	Inherited the main County of Pinneberg after his cousin Ernest died without descendants. He too died childless.
Jobst Herman	6 October 1593; Borken; Son of Henry V and Matilda of Limburg-Styrum	17 January 1622 – 5 November 1635	County of Pinneberg (with Schauenburg)	Catherine Sophia of Brunswick-Harburg (1577-1665) no children	5 November 1635; Bückeburg aged 42	Inherited the main County of Pinneberg after his cousin Ernest died without descendants. He too died childless.
Gemen annexed to Pinneberg
Otto V	1 March 1614; Borken; Son of George Herman of Holstein-Gemen and Elisabeth of Lippe	5 November 1635 – 15 November 1640	County of Pinneberg (with Schauenburg)	Unmarried	15 November 1640; Bückeburg aged 26	Nephew of Henry V and cousin of Jobst Herman. Died unmarried.
Pinneberg annexed to the Duchy of Holstein

== See also ==
- House of Schaumburg
- List of Rulers of Schleswig-Holstein
