= Gerhard II of Holstein-Plön =

German nobleman

Gerhard II, Count of Holstein-Plön
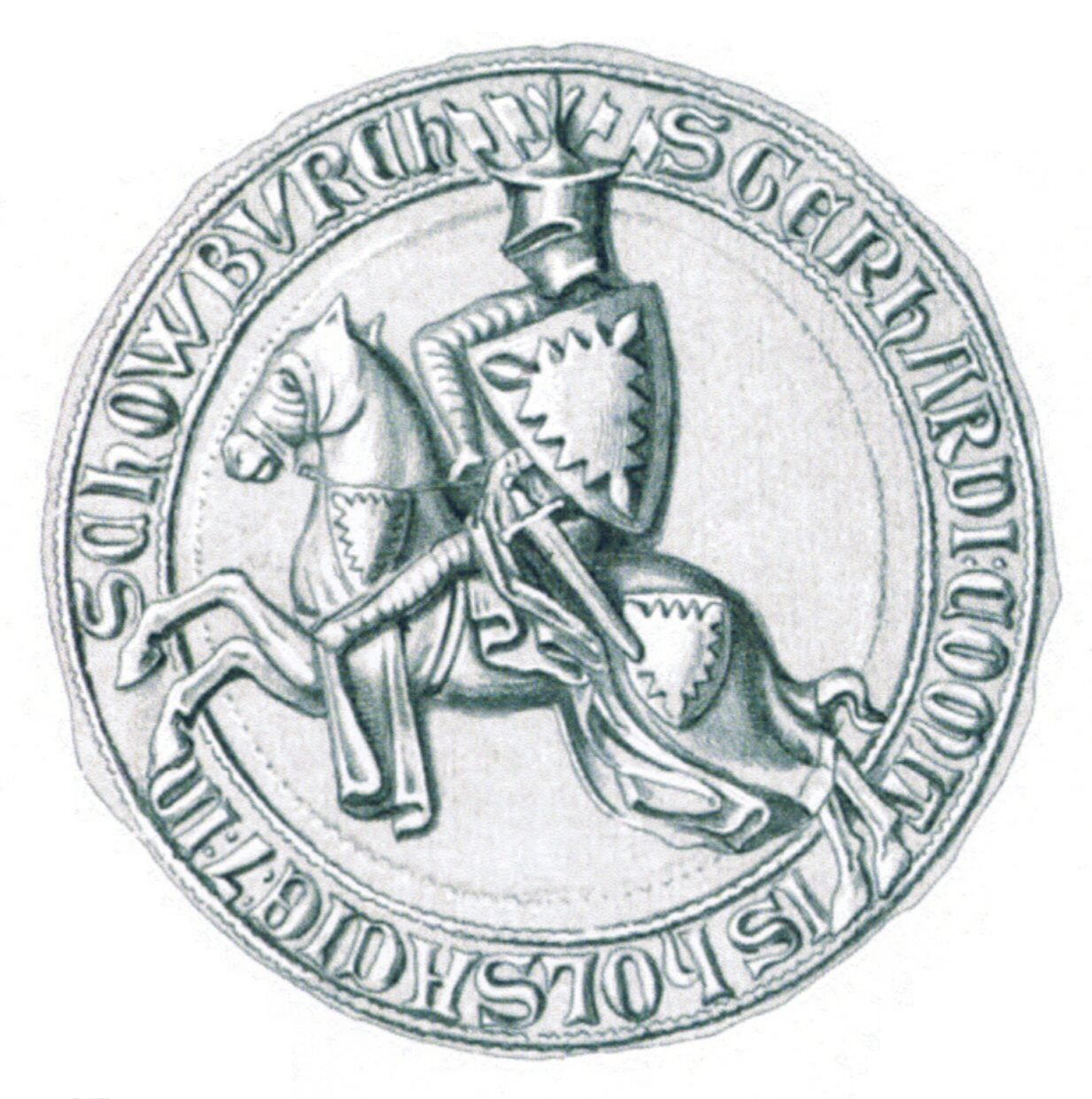
- Seal used by Gerhard between 1274 and 1311
- Born: 1254
- Died: 28 October 1312 (aged 57–58)
- Noble family: House of Schauenburg
- Spouses: Ingeborg of Sweden; Agnes of Brandenburg
- Issue: by Ingeborg: Catherine; Gerhard IV; Valdemar, Count of Holstein-Schauenburg; Elizabeth, Duchess of Pomerania by Agnes: John III
- Father: Gerhard I, Count of Holstein-Itzehoe
- Mother: Elisabeth of Mecklenburg

Gerhard II of Holstein-Plön (1254 - 28 October 1312), nicknamed the Blind, was Count of Holstein-Plön from 1290 to 1312.

== Life ==
He was the second son of Gerhard I, Count of Holstein-Itzehoe and Elisabeth of Mecklenburg.

After his father's death in 1290, the county was divided among the surviving sons. Gerhard II received Holstein-Plön; his younger brother Adolph VI received Holstein-Schauenburg and Henry received Holstein-Rendsburg.

== Seal ==
The seal reads

S(IGILLUM)*GERARDI*COMITIS*HOLTSACIE*ET*IN*SCHOWENBURCH
"Seal of Count Gerhard of Hostein and Schauenburg"

== Marriages and issue ==
He married on 12 December 1275 the Swedish Princess Ingeborg (c. 1262 – c. 1293), a daughter of King Valdemar of Sweden and his wife Sophia. They had four children:

- Catherine (c. 1276 – before 1300)
- Gerhard IV (1277–1323), Count of Holstein-Plön
- Valdemar (c. 1279 – 29 July 1306), Count of Holstein-Schauenburg, died after the Second Battle of Uetersen
- Elizabeth (c. 1282 – { 20 July 1318 or 1319), married Otto I, Duke of Pomerania
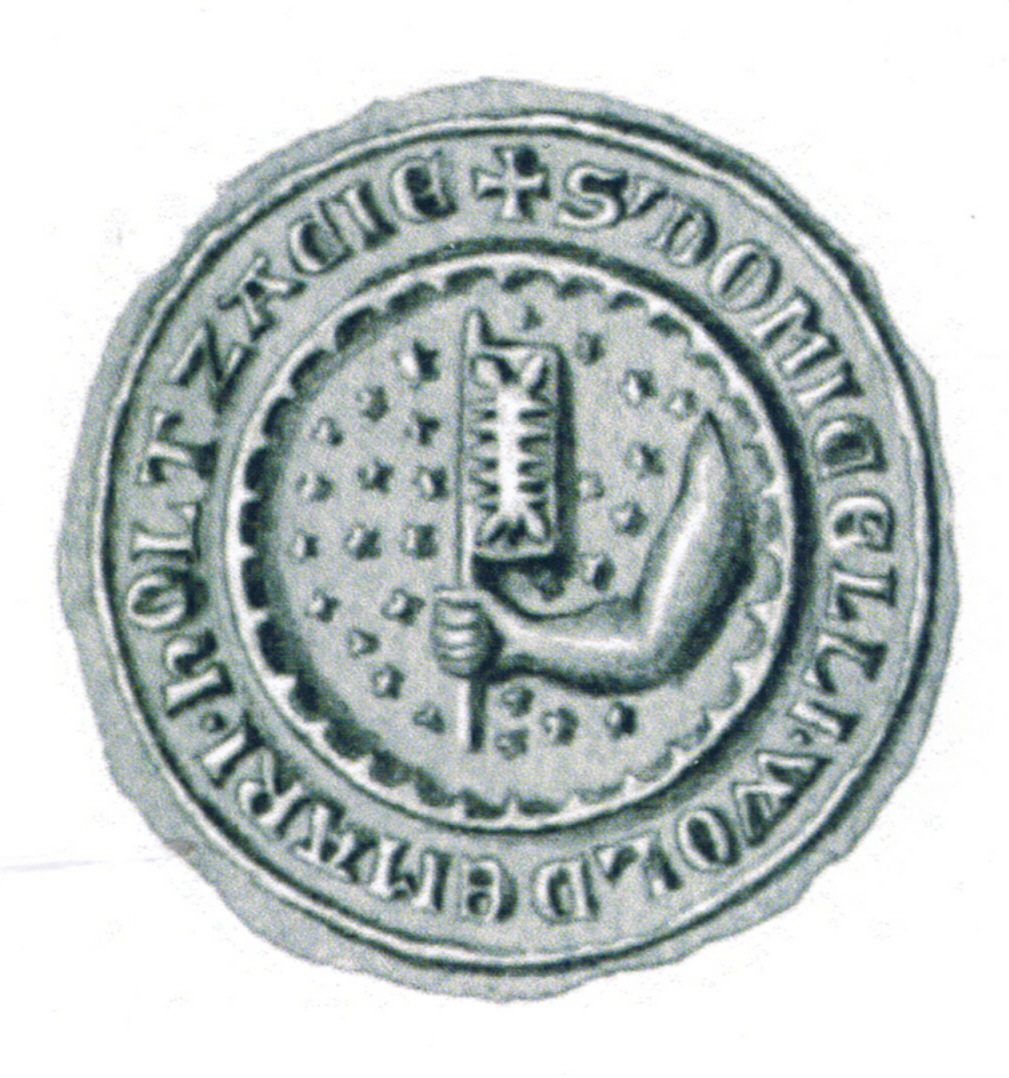
Seal of Waldemar of Holstein-Plön

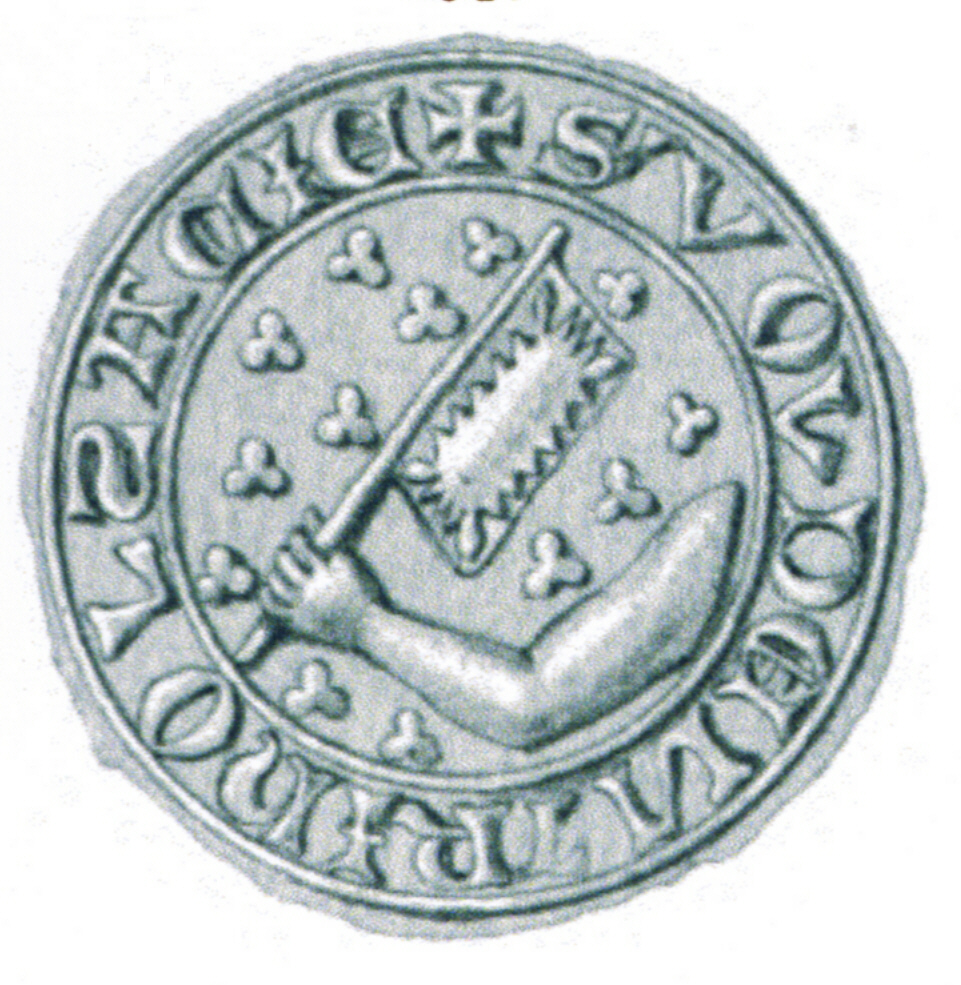
Seal of Waldemar of Holstein-Plön

In 1293 Gerhard married Agnes of Brandenburg, the widow of King Eric V of Denmark. With her, he had a son:

- John III (c. 1297 - 27 September 1359), Count of Holstein in Kiel from 1312 until his death.

== Ancestors ==
Ancestors of Gerhard II of Holstein-Plön

8. Adolf III of Holstein (1160-1225); Count of Schauenburg and Holstein
4. Adolf IV of Holstein (1205-1261); Count of Schauenburg and Holstein
9. Adelheid of Querfurt
2. Gerhard I, Count of Holstein-Itzehoe (1232-1290); Count of Holstein-Itzehoe
10. Hermann II, Lord of Lippe
5. Heilwig of Lippe
11. Oda of Tecklenburg
1. Gerhard II, Count of Holstein-Plön (1254-1312); Count of Holstein-Plön
12. Henry Borwin II, Lord of Mecklenburg
6. John I, Lord of Mecklenburg
13. Christina of Sweden
3. Elizabeth of Mecklenburg
14. Poppo VII of Henneberg
7. Luitgart of Henneberg
15. Elisabeth of Widlberg

Gerhard II of Holstein-Plön House of Schauenburg Born: 1254 Died: 28 October 1312
Preceded by Gerhard I as Count of Holstein-Itzehoe	Count of Holstein-Plön; 1290-1312	Succeeded by Gerhard IV and John III
