= Holstein-Plön =

County of Holstein-Plön Grafschaft Holstein-Ploen
- 1290–1390
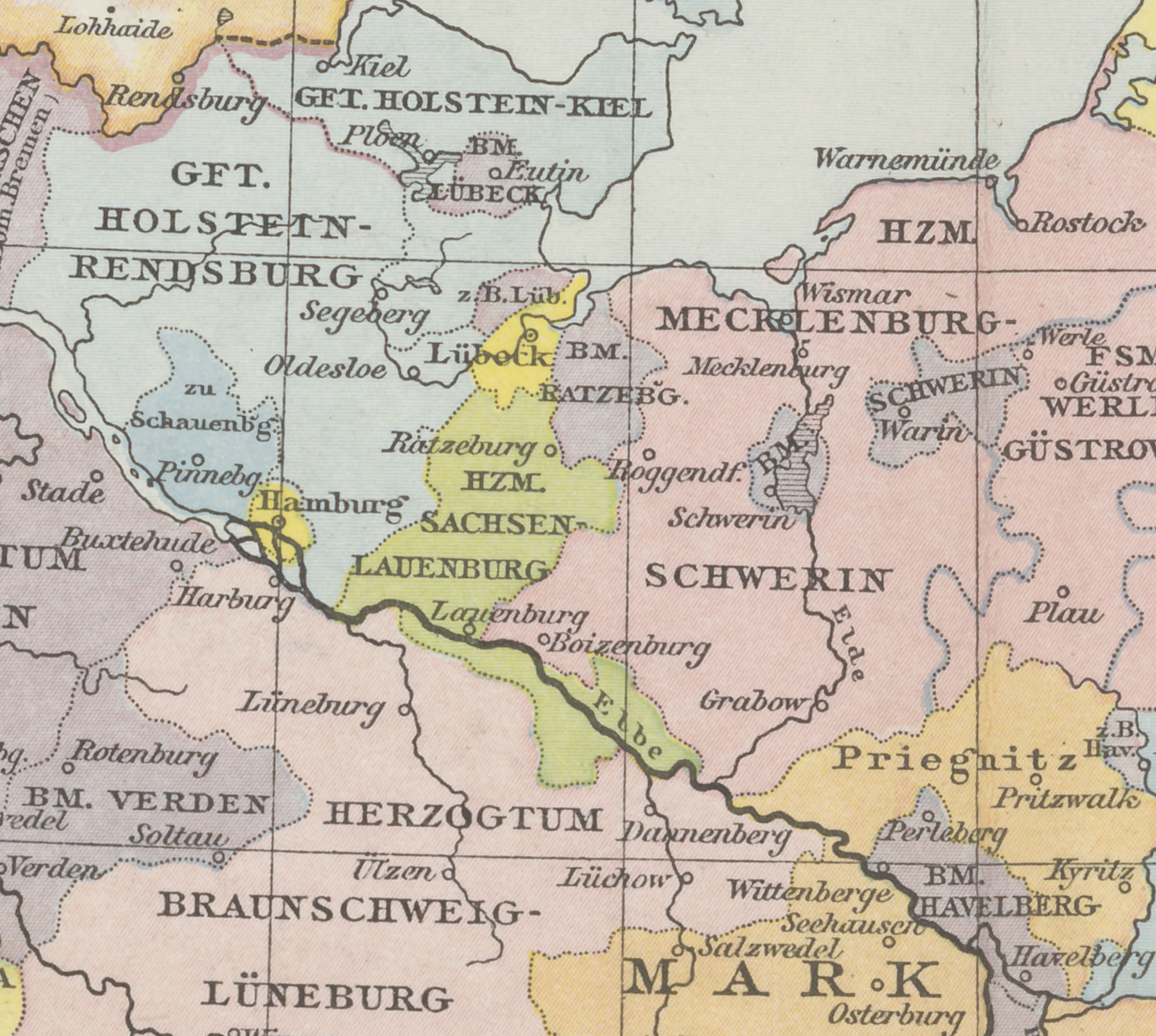
- Holstein-Plön within Holstein-Kiel and neighbouring territories circa 1400
- Status: imperial county
- Capital: Plön
- Common languages: Northern Low Saxon, German
- Religion: Roman Catholic
- Government: monarchy
- Counts of Schauenburg
  - Upper house: House of Schauenburg
- Historical era: Middle Ages
  - Partition of Holstein-Itzehoe following death of Gerhard I: 1290
  - Reversion in 1390 to Holstein-Rendsburg after the comital male line died out: 1390
Preceded by	Succeeded by
Image missing / Holstein-Itzehoe	Holstein-Rendsburg

Holstein-Plön was a county (Grafschaft) in the Holy Roman Empire centred on Plön in Holstein. It was held by the House of Schauenburg who had ruled in Holstein and Stormarn since 1110/11. The county emerged before 1295 when the County of Holstein-Itzehoe was partitioned after the death of Count Gerhard I of Holstein-Itzehoe (died 1290) into the counties of Holstein-Plön, Holstein-Pinneberg and Holstein-Rendsburg.

The following counts ruled over Holstein-Plön:

- 1295–1312 Gerhard II the Blind (born 1253; died 1312), married Agnes of Brandenburg (born after 1255; died 1304), daughter of John I of Brandenburg, in 1293
- 1312–1314 Gerhard IV (died before 1320), dean (Dompropst) of Lübeck Cathedral, 1300–1311
- 1312–1359 John III the Mild (born c. 1296; died 1359)
- 1323–1350 Gerhard V (born c. 1315; died 1350) was never a ruler, but only a landowner and canon at Lübeck Cathedral
- 1321–1359 John III the Mild, also Count of Holstein-Kiel and Lord of Fehmarn
- 1359–1390 Adolphus VII (died 1390), also Count of Holstein-Kiel and Lord of Fehmarn

Following the death of Gerhard II his sons, Gerhard IV of Holstein-Plön and his younger half-brother John III, ruled jointly over Holstein-Plön. In 1314 Gerhard IV sold his lands to John III, who thus became the sole Count of Holstein-Plön. John III conquered Holstein-Kiel with Gerhard III of Holstein-Rendsburg. Holstein-Plön reverted to Holstein-Kiel in 1350 upon the death of 27-year-old Gerhard V without issue.

When the Plön line died out in 1390, Holstein-Kiel (and Holstein-Plön within it) reverted to Holstein-Rendsburg, ruled by Count Nicholas of Holstein-Rendsburg (died 1397) and his nephew, Count Gerhard VI of Holstein-Rendsburg (died 1404). A circa-1400 map of the region shows the borders of Holstein-Rendsburg and its subordinate counties, Holstein-Kiel and Holstein-Plön.

== Rise and fall of the county ==
Holstein
Holstein-Kiel (1261–1390)	Holstein-Itzehoe (1261–1300)
Holstein-Segeberg (1273-1308)
Holstein-Plön (1300–1390)	Holstein-Rendsburg (1300–1459)	Holstein-Pinneberg (1300–1640)
Duchy of Holstein (from 1474)
Imperial County of Rantzau (1650–1726)
