= Holstein-Kiel =

The imperial county of Holstein-Kiel was a line of the House of Schauenburg and Holstein from 1261 to 1390.

== History ==
The County of Holstein was ruled until 1238 by Adolphus IV of Schauenburg and Holstein. When he retired, his sons John I and Gerhard I ruled jointly in Holstein. In 1261 they divided the county, John taking Kiel and founding the line of Holstein-Kiel, and Gerhard taking Itzehoe and founding the Holstein-Itzehoe line.

In 1300 Holstein-Itzehoe was further divided into Holstein-Plön, Holstein-Pinneberg and Holstein-Rendsburg.

In 1350 the County of Holstein-Plön fell to the counts of Holstein-Kiel.

In 1390 the last Count of Holstein-Kiel, and hence of Holstein-Plön, died without issue. Both counties were inherited by the line of Holstein-Rendsburg.

== Counts of Holstein-Kiel ==
- 1261-1263 John I (1229 – 1263)
- 1263-1273 Adolphus V the Pomeranian (1252 – 1308), from 1273 Count of Holstein-Segeberg
- 1263-1316 John II the One-Eyed (1253 – 1321)
- 1316-1359 John III the Mild (ca. 1297 – 1359), from 1312 Count of Holstein-Plön
- 1359-1390 Adolphus VII (ca. 1329 – 1390), also Count of Holstein-Plön

Following the death of John I, his sons, Adolphus V and John II ruled Holstein-Kiel jointly. In 1273, they divided Holstein-Kiel, John II ruling from Kiel; Adolphus V ruling from Segeberg and founding the line of Holstein-Segeberg. When Adolphus V died in 1308 without a male heir, Holstein-Segeberg returned to Holstein-Kiel.

The successor of John II in 1316 was John III, a son of Gerhard II of Holstein-Plön.

After the death of Count Gerhard V of Holstein-Plön, a nephew of John III, the Plön main line ended in 1350 and so John III took over the County of Holstein-Plön.

When Adolphus VII died without heirs in 1390, Holstein-Kiel and Holstein-Plön went into the hands of Count Gerhard VI of Holstein-Rendsburg.
