= Stormarn =

Stormarn may refer to:

- Stormarn (district) (1867 - present), a district or county within the German state of Schleswig-Holstein
- Stormarn (gau) (before 11th century - 1867), a Saxon gau in northern Europe
