= County of Rantzau =

State of the Holy Roman Empire

Imperial County of Rantzau Reichsgrafschaft Rantzau
- 1651–1864
- Coat of arms
- Status: Imperial county
- Capital: Barmstedt
- History
  - Established: 1651
  - Acquired by Denmark-Norway: 9 April 1726
  - Mediatised to Prussia: 1864
Preceded by	Succeeded by
Image missing / Holstein-Gottorp	Kingdom of Prussia

The Imperial County of Rantzau (German: Reichsgrafschaft Rantzau) was an immediate state of the Holy Roman Empire which lasted from 1650 to 1864. Its territory is more or less congruent with the present Amt Rantzau.

== History ==
Map of the County of Rantzau (c. 1860)

In 1650, Frederick III, Duke of Holstein-Gottorp, sold his part of the Lordship of Pinneberg, which had formerly belonged to the County of Schauenburg, to Count Christian zu Rantzau (1614–1663), royal Danish governor of Holstein. In 1650 or 1651, Rantzau became an immediate county and state of the Holy Roman Empire. In 1726, it was annexed by the Danish rulers, after Wilhelm Adolf, Count of Rantzau (1688-1734), had murdered his brother and was imprisoned. Wilhelm Adolf died in 1733 and Rantzau was inherited by the Duchy of Holstein, which was reigned by the Danish kings and its secundogenitures.

== Origin in the House of Holstein ==
Holstein
Holstein-Kiel (1261–1390)	Holstein-Itzehoe (1261–1300)
Holstein-Segeberg (1273-1308)
Holstein-Plön (1300–1390)	Holstein-Rendsburg (1300–1459)	Holstein-Pinneberg (1300–1640)
Duchy of Holstein (from 1474)
Imperial County of Rantzau (1650–1726)
