= Adolf II of Holstein =

Count of Schauenburg and Holstein (1128–1164)

- Born: c. 1128
- Died: 6 July 1164; Verchen
- Buried: Minden
- Noble family: House of Schauenburg
- Spouse: Mechthild of Schwarzburg-Käfernburg
- Issue: Adolf III of Holstein
- Father: Adolf I of Holstein
- Mother: Hildewa

Adolf II of Holstein (c. 1128 – 6 July 1164) was the Count of Schauenburg and Holstein from 1130 until his death, though he was briefly out of Holstein from 1137 until 1142. He succeeded his father Adolf I under the regency of his mother, Hildewa.

After the death of the Emperor Lothair II (1137), the new king, Conrad III, granted the Duchy of Saxony to Albert the Bear. Adolf was consequently deprived of Holstein because he was a Welf supporter and refused to recognise Albert as duke. He only received it back in 1142 when Conrad and Henry the Lion were reconciled.

In 1143 as a result of the Wendish Crusade, Henry and Adolf divided the rule of the conquered Slavic lands to their east. Adolf received Wagria with its chief city, the castle of Sigberg, built by Lothair, and Henry received Polabia with Ratzeburg as its capital. Sigberg became Adolf's chief fortress and most regular seat. Adolf promoted Christianity in his new lands, especially through the missionary work of Vicelinus. Adolf, encouraged by Lothair, promoted German colonisation of his Slavic territories, especially with colonists from not only his own lands but also from Westphalia, Flanders, Holland, Utrecht, and Frisia.

In 1143 or 1144, Adolf built Lübeck, the first German port on the Baltic Sea. Adolf also built the first castle (1143) in Lübeck: a wood and earth construction. In 1157, Lübeck was burned and rebuilt by Henry the Lion, to whom Adolf transferred it in 1159.

Adolf supported Sweyn III of Denmark against the claimant Canute V in a dispute over the Danish throne. Canute, with the help of Etheler von Dithmarschen, attacked Holstein and burned Oldenburg in Holstein, devastating the German north coast.

In 1159, Adolf accompanied the Emperor Frederick I into Italy and in 1164 he aided Henry the Lion against the Obotrites, dying in the Battle of Verchen. He was buried in Minden. He was succeeded by his son, Adolf III, under the regency of his widow, Mechtild of Schwarzburg-Käfernburg.

== Sources ==
- Thompson, James Westfall (1928). Feudal Germany, Volume II. New York: Frederick Ungar Publishing.
- Manuel Talaván (2010). Relaciones germano eslavas en el contexto de cruzada: la cruzada venda. Intus-Legere Historia. Vol. 4, Nº 2; pp. 19–44

Adolphus of Schauenburg House of Schaumburg Born: c. 1128 Died: 6 July 1164 in Verchen
Regnal titles
Preceded by Adolf I	Count of Holstein; 1130–1137	Succeeded by Henry
Preceded by Adolf I	Count of Schauenburg; 1130–1164	Succeeded by Adolf III
Preceded by Henry	Count of Holstein; 1142–1164	Succeeded by Adolf III
