= Gerhard I of Holstein-Itzehoe =

Count of Holstein-Itzehoe

Gerhard I, Count of Holstein-Itzehoe
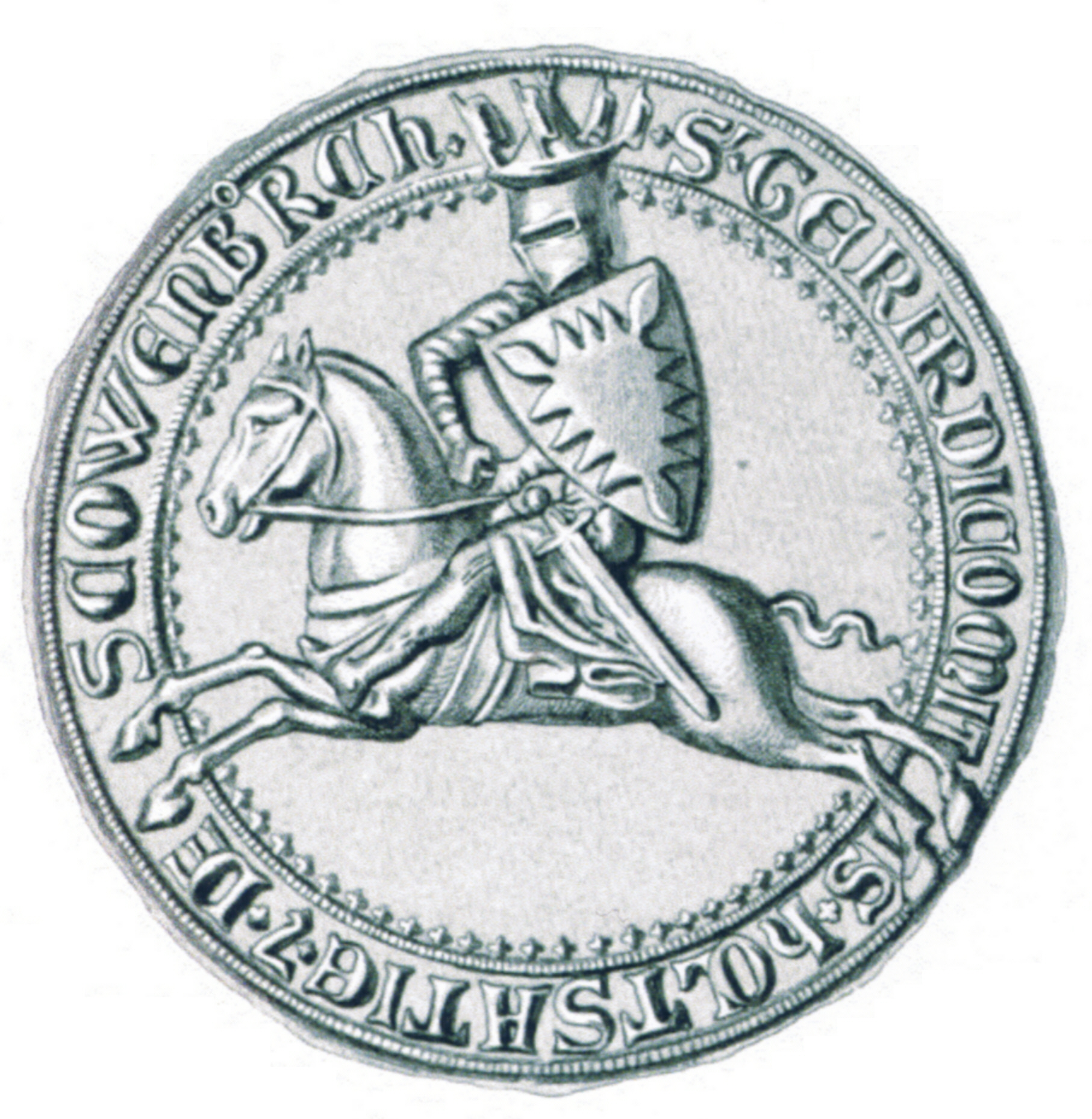
- Seal of Gerhard I, which he used from 1254 to 1287
- Born: 1232
- Died: 21 December 1290
- Noble family: House of Schauenburg
- Spouses: Elizabeth of Mecklenburg; Adelaide of Montferrat
- Issue: Gerhard II; Adolph VI; Henry I
- Father: Adolf IV of Holstein
- Mother: Heilwig of Lippe

Gerhard I, Count of Holstein-Itzehoe (1232 – 21 December 1290) was the only count of Holstein-Itzehoe.

== Life ==
He was the second son of Count Adolf IV of Holstein and Heilwig of Lippe.

When his father retired to a monastery in 1238, he ruled the Holstein jointly with his elder brother John I, initially under the guardianship of their brother-in-law the Duke Abel of Schleswig. When they came of age, the brothers took up government and continue their joint rule. In 1255, they concluded a trade agreement with Lübeck.

When their father died in 1261, John and Gerhard divided Holstein. Gerhard took Holstein-Itzehoe, consisting of the districts of Stormarn, Plön and Schaumburg, with his residence in Itzehoe. John received Holstein-Kiel, consisting of the districts Kiel, Wagria and East Holstein, with his seat in Kiel. John later won Rendsburg back from Denmark and traded it with Gerhard for Segeberg.

Gerhard founded several villages, in order to develop Holstein and control the area. He also developed the County's administration. He fought ward with the Archdiocese of Bremen, the City of Lübeck and the landed gentry in his county. In 1262, he won the Battle of the Loh Moor. In 1263, John died and Gerhard became regent of Kiel and Segeberg for John's sons.

Gerhard I died in 1290. After his death, his sons subdivided Holstein-itzehoe into Holstein-Plön, Holstein-Pinneberg and Holstein-Rendsburg.

== Seal ==
The inscription on his seal reads: S(IGILLUM)* GERARDI*COMITIS*HOLTSATIE*ET*DE*SCOWENB(O)RCH ("Seal of Count Gerhard of Holstein and Schauenburg").

== Marriages and issue ==
He married around 1250 with Elizabeth (d. c. 1280), a daughter of John I of Mecklenburg and had the following children with her:

- Liutgard, (c. 1251 – Aft. 1289), married:
  1. Duke John of Brunswick-Lüneburg
  2. Prince Albert I of Anhalt-Zerbst
- John (1253 – c. 1272), Canon in Hamburg
- Gerhard II (1254–1312), Count of Holstein-Plön
- Adolph VI (1256–1315), Count of Holstein-Pinneberg and Schauenburg
- Henry I (1258–1304), Count of Holstein-Rendsburg
- Elisabeth (d. before 1284), married to Count Burchard of Wolpe
- Albrert (1272–1281)
- Bruno
- Otto
- Matilda, married to Count John of Wunstorf
- Hedwig (before 1264 – c. 1325), married to King Magnus III of Sweden

Around 1280, he married Adelaide (Alessia; c. 1237 – 1285), the widow of Albert I, Duke of Brunswick-Lüneburg, and a daughter of Marquess Boniface II of Monferrat (c. 1203 – 1253). This marriage remained childless.

Gerhard I of Holstein-Itzehoe House of Schauenburg Born: 1232 Died: 21 December 1290
Regnal titles
Preceded by Adolph IV	Count of Holstein; 1238–1261 with his brother John I (1238–1261)	Partition of Holstein
Preceded by Adolph IV	Count of Schaumburg; 1238–1290 with his brother John I (1238–1261)	Succeeded by Adolph VI as Count of Schaumburg and Count of Holstein-Pinneberg
New title Partitioned from Holstein	Count of Holstein-Itzehoe; 1261–1290	Succeeded by Adolph VI as Count of Schaumburg and Count of Holstein-Pinneberg
New title Partitioned from Holstein	Count of Holstein-Itzehoe; 1261–1290	Succeeded by Gerhard II as Count of Holstein-Plön
New title Partitioned from Holstein	Count of Holstein-Itzehoe; 1261–1290	Succeeded by Henry I as Count of Holstein-Rendsburg
