= Holstein-Segeberg =

The County of Holstein-Segeberg was a county in the state of Holstein from 1273 to 1308 and a line of the noble family of Schauenburg and Holstein. The only count of Holstein-Segeberg was Adolphus V, nicknamed the Pomeranian, who was born in 1252 and died in 1308.

== History ==
After the death of his father, John I, in 1263, his sons, Adolphus V, John II and Albert I (died 1300, who became the cathedral provost (Dompropst) of Hamburg) initially ruled the County of Holstein-Kiel jointly. In 1273 they divided the inheritance, with John II continuing to rule Kiel. Adolphus V ruled Segeberg and thus founded the line of Holstein-Segeberg. When he died in 1308 without male issue, Holstein-Segeberg fell once again to Holstein-Kiel. Adolphus, the younger son of Count John II, who was born in 1281, ruled Holstein-Segeberg from 1308 until he was stabbed to death in 1315.

Count Albert II (1369–1403) of Holstein-Rendsburg, second son of Count Henry II (d 1385), received the castle and Vogtei of Segeberg as his own lordship as a result of the partition division of 9 September 1394; and Kiel through the partition treaty of 28 August 1397.

== Counties in Holstein (overview) ==
Holstein
Holstein-Kiel (1261–1390)	Holstein-Itzehoe (1261–1300)
Holstein-Segeberg (1273-1308)
Holstein-Plön (1300–1390)	Holstein-Rendsburg (1300–1459)	Holstein-Pinneberg (1300–1640)
Duchy of Holstein (from 1474)
Imperial County of Rantzau (1650–1726)
