= Schauenburg =

- Municipality
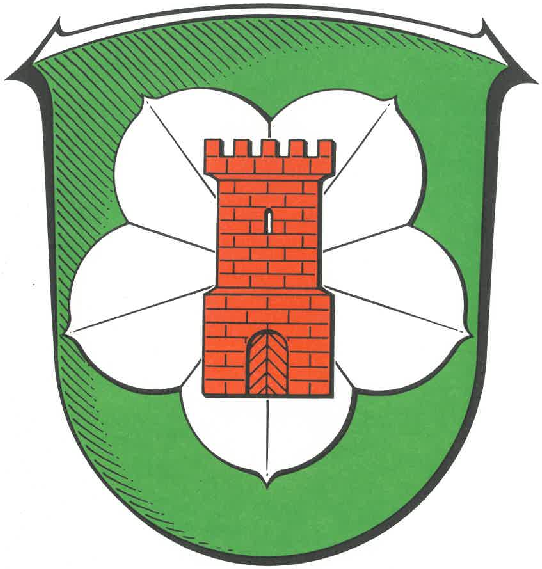
- Coat of arms

- Location of Schauenburg within Kassel district
- Interactive map of Schauenburg
- Location within Germany Location within Hesse
- Coordinates: 51°17′N 09°21′E
- Country: Germany
- State: Hesse
- Admin. region: Kassel
- District: Kassel

Government
  - Mayor (2023–29): Michael Plätzer (SPD)

Area
  - Total: 30.85 km^{2} (11.91 sq mi)
- Elevation: 270–615 m (886–2,018 ft)

Population (2025-12-31)
  - Total: 10,309
  - Density: 334.2/km^{2} (865.5/sq mi)
- Time zone: UTC+01:00 (CET)
  - Summer (DST): UTC+02:00 (CEST)
- Postal codes: 34270
- Dialling codes: 05601
- Vehicle registration: KS
- Website: www.gemeinde-schauenburg.de

Schauenburg is a municipality in the district of Kassel, in Hesse, Germany. It is situated 11 km (7 mi) west of Kassel. It currently consists of 5 villages: Elgershausen, Hoof, Breitenbach, Martinhagen and Elmshagen, with Elgershausen being the largest and Elmshagen the smallest. The municipal administration is located in Hoof.
