= Duchy of Holstein =

German state from 1474 to 1864

Duchy of Holstein Herzogtum Holstein (German) Hertugdømmet Holsten (Danish)
- 1474–1864
- Civil ensign Coat of arms

- Location and borders of the Duchy of Holstein by 1789
- Status: State of the Holy Roman Empire (1474–1806); State of the German Confederation (1815–1864), Personal union with the Kingdom of Denmark (1474–1544; 1773–1864)
- Capital: Glückstadt
- Common languages: German, Low German, Danish
- Religion: Lutheran
- Government: Feudal Monarchy
- Duke
  - 1474–1481: Christian I (first)
  - 1863–1864: Christian IX (last)
- Historical era: Early Modern
  - Treaty of Ribe: 5 March 1460
  - Duchy established: 14 February 1474
  - Schleswig War: 1 February 1864
  - Treaty of Vienna: 30 October 1864
- Currency: Rigsdaler
Preceded by	Succeeded by
Holstein	Province of Schleswig-Holstein

The Duchy of Holstein (German: Herzogtum Holstein; Danish: Hertugdømmet Holsten) was the northernmost state of the Holy Roman Empire, located in the present German state of Schleswig-Holstein. It originated when King Christian I of Denmark had his County of Holstein-Rendsburg elevated to a duchy by Emperor Frederick III in 1474. Members of the Danish House of Oldenburg ruled Holstein – jointly with the Duchy of Schleswig – for its entire existence.

From 1490 to 1523 and again from 1544 to 1773 the Duchy was partitioned between various Oldenburg branches, most notably the dukes of Holstein-Glückstadt (identical with the Kings of Denmark) and Holstein-Gottorp. The duchy ceased to exist when the Kingdom of Prussia annexed it in 1866 after the Austro-Prussian War.

== History ==
The northern border of Holstein along the Eider River had already formed the northern border of the Carolingian Empire, after Emperor Charlemagne upon the Saxon Wars reached an agreement with King Hemming of Denmark in 811. The lands of Schleswig beyond the river remained a fief of the Danish Crown, while Holstein became an integral part of East Francia, the Kingdom of Germany and the Holy Roman Empire.

=== Establishment ===
Holstein
Holstein-Kiel (1261–1390)	Holstein-Itzehoe (1261–1300)
Holstein-Segeberg (1273-1308)
Holstein-Plön (1300–1390)	Holstein-Rendsburg (1300–1459)	Holstein-Pinneberg (1300–1640)
Duchy of Holstein (from 1474)
Imperial County of Rantzau (1650–1726)

Adolf VIII, the last Count of Holstein-Rendsburg and Duke of Schleswig had died without heirs in 1459. As Schleswig had been a Danish fief, it had to fall back to King Christian I of Denmark, who, himself a nephew of Adolf, also sought to enter into possession of Holstein. He was backed by the local nobility, who supported the continued common administration of both lands and by the 1460 Treaty of Ribe proclaimed him as the new Count of Holstein.

Nevertheless, the comital Holstein lands south of the Eider River officially remained a mediate fief held by the Ascanian dukes of Saxe-Lauenburg. In 1474 Emperor Frederick III conferred Imperial immediacy to Christian by elevating him to a Duke of Holstein.

=== Partition ===
In 1544, the duchies of Schleswig and Holstein were partitioned in three parts between Christian's grandson Christian III of Denmark and his two younger half-brothers (who had to renounce the Danish throne), as follows:

- The royal part, held by Christian III and his successors (identical with the Kings of Denmark). From 1648 the royal parts of Schleswig and Holstein were administered out of Glückstadt and became known as the Duchy of Schleswig-Holstein-Glückstadt. Before 1773 its Holstein territory consisted of the following Ämter: Rendsburg, South Dithmarschen, Steinburg, Segeberg, and Plön.
- The Duchy of Schleswig-Holstein in Haderslev, held by Duke Hans the Elder. Hans had no issue and after his death in 1580, his territories were divided among his brothers.
- The Duchy of Schleswig-Holstein in Gottorp, held by Duke Adolf and his successors.

In addition, significant parts of Holstein were jointly administered by the dukes of Holstein-Glückstadt and the dukes of Holstein-Gottorp, mainly on the Baltic Sea coast.

In 1640, the County of Holstein-Pinneberg, whose ruling house was extinct, was merged in the royal part of the Duchy of Holstein.

=== Reunification ===
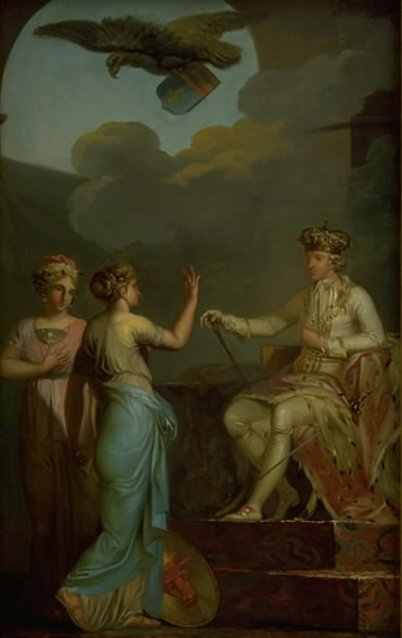
Allegorical depiction of Christian VII of Denmark uniting the royal and ducal parts of Holstein, painted by Nicolai Abildgaard

In 1713, during the Great Northern War, the estates of the dukes of Schleswig-Holstein-Gottorp in Schleswig including Schloss Gottorf were conquered by royal Danish troops. In the 1720 Treaty of Frederiksborg, Duke Charles Frederick of Schleswig-Holstein-Gottorp ceded them to his liege lord the Danish crown.

His remaining territories formed the Duchy of Holstein-Gottorp, administered from Kiel. In 1773, Charles Frederick's grandson, Emperor Paul I of Russia finally gave his Holstein lands to the Danish king, in his function as duke of Holstein, in exchange for the County of Oldenburg, and Holstein was reunited as a single state.

With the dissolution of the Holy Roman Empire in 1806, the Duchy of Holstein gained sovereignty.

After the 1815 Congress of Vienna, the Duchy of Holstein became a member of the German Confederation, resulting in several diplomatic and military conflicts about the so-called Schleswig-Holstein question. Denmark defended its rule over Holstein in the First Schleswig War of 1848–51 against the Kingdom of Prussia. However, in the Second Schleswig War (1864) Prussian and Austrian troops conquered Schleswig. Christian IX of Denmark had to renounce both Schleswig and Holstein in the Treaty of Vienna (1864) on 30 October.

At first placed under joint rule in a condominium, Prussia and Austria then assumed administration of Schleswig and Holstein, respectively, under the Gastein Convention of 14 August 1865. However, tensions between the two powers culminated in the Austro-Prussian War of 1866. Following the Peace of Prague (1866), the victorious Prussians annexed both Schleswig and Holstein by decree of 24 December 1866, and later established the unified Province of Schleswig-Holstein.

== List of stadtholders in Holstein ==
The Danish king in his function as duke of Holstein, and duke of Schleswig, appointed stadtholders (German: Statthalter; Latin: produx; Danish: statholder) to represent him in the duchies. The stadtholders fulfilled the tasks related to the ducal power as patrimonial lords in the royal shares of Holstein and Schleswig, as well as the royal part in the condominial government with the houses of Gottorp and Haderslev (the latter extinct in 1580) for all the duchies of Holstein (until retreat of Gottorp in 1773) and Schleswig (until Gottorp's deposal from dukedom there in 1720).

- 1523/45–1550: Johan Rantzau
- 1550–1556: Count Bertram von Ahlefeldt
- 1556–1598: Heinrich Rantzau
- 1598–1600: vacancy?
- 1600–1627: Gert Rantzau (1558–1627)
- 1627–1647: vacancy
- 1647–1648: Prince Frederick of Denmark
- 1648–1663: Christian zu Rantzau
- 1663–1685: Friedrich von Ahlefeldt, Count of Langeland (1623–1686), vice-stadtholder since 1660
- 1685–1697: Detlev zu Rantzau (1644–1697)
- 1697–1708: Friedrich von Ahlefeldt, Count of Langeland (1662–1708), vice-stadtholder since 1686
- 1708–1722: Carl von Ahlefeldt, Count of Langeland (1708–1722)
- 1722–1730: ?
- 1730–1731: Margrave Charles Augustus of Brandenburg-Kulmbach (1663–1731), uncle of the next
- 1731–1762: Margrave Frederick Ernest of Brandenburg-Kulmbach (1703–1762), brother-in-law of King Christian VI
- 1762–1768: Count Friedrich Ludwig von Ahlefeldt-Dehn (1697–1771)
- 1768–1836: Prince Charles of Hesse-Kassel
- 1836–1842: Prince Frederick of Hesse-Kassel
- 1842–1851: Prince Frederick of Schleswig-Holstein-Sonderburg-Augustenburg
- 1851–1864: Christian zu Rantzau?

== See also ==
- Peace of Prague (1866)
- List of rulers of Schleswig-Holstein
