= Adolf III of Holstein =

Count of Shauenburg and Holstein

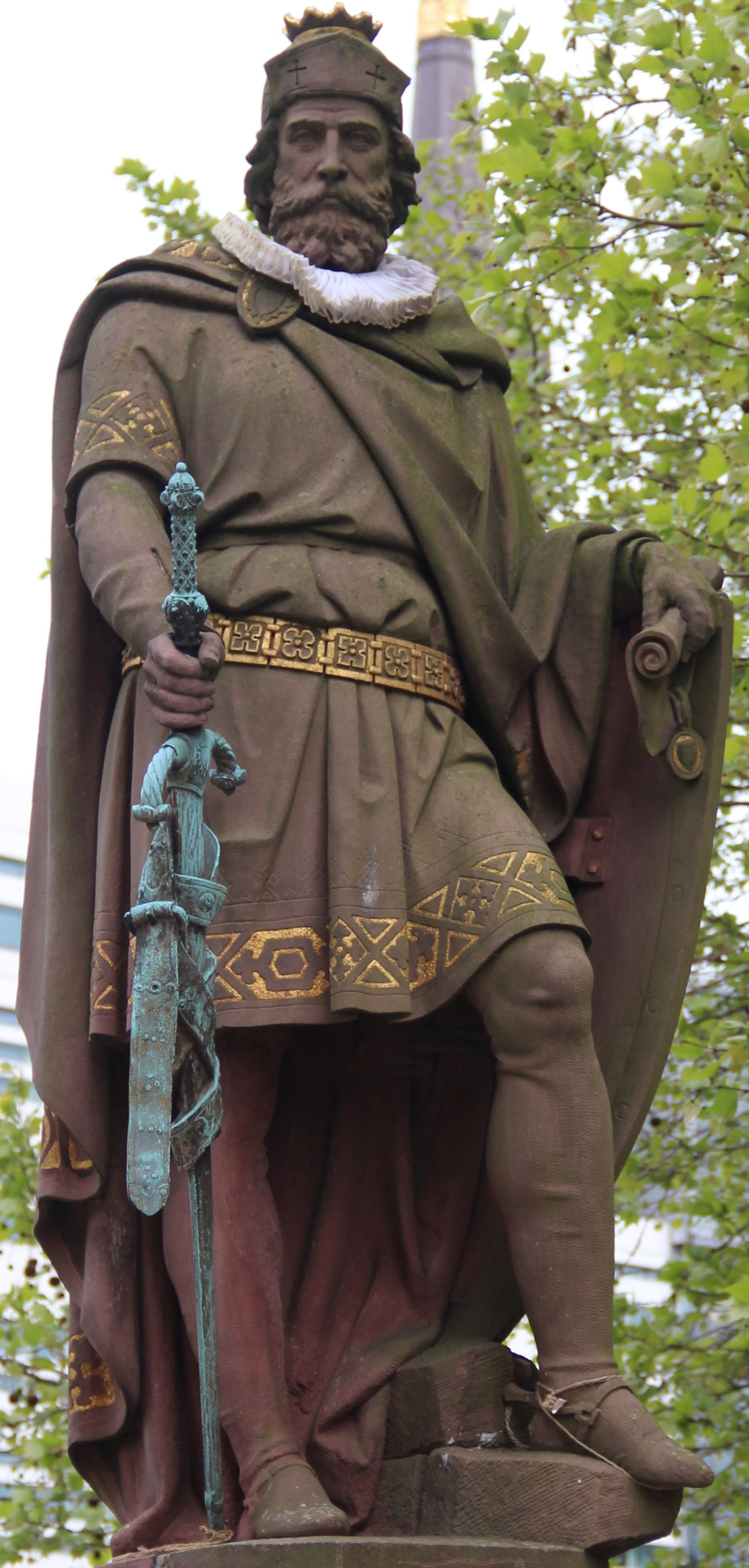
- Statue of Adolf III by Engelbert Peiffer, on the Trostbrücke in Hamburg
- Born: c. 1160
- Died: 3 January 1225
- Noble family: House of Schauenburg
- Spouses: Adelheid of Assel; Adelheid of Querfurt
- Issue: Adolf IV of Holstein
- Father: Adolf II of Holstein
- Mother: Mechthild of Schwarzburg-Käfernburg

Adolf III, Count of Schauenburg and Holstein (c. 1160 – 3 January 1225) was the ruler of the Counties of Schauenburg and Holstein. He is particularly remembered for his establishment of a new settlement for traders on the banks of the Alster near the Neue Burg in Hamburg.

== Descent ==
Adolf III was the only son of Count Adolf II of Holstein-Wagria and succeeded him in 1164, initially under the guardianship of his mother Mechthild of Schwarzburg-Käfernburg, a daughter of Count Sizzo III of Schwarzburg-Käfernburg.

== Life ==
Count Adolf III at first supported Henry the Lion. He accompanied him on his expedition against Philipp von Heinsberg, Archbishop of Cologne, fought at the Battle of Halerfeld on 1 August 1180 (to the north-west of Osnabrück) at the side of Count Bernhard I of Ratzeburg, when he received from Henry the Lion the decisive rights in the region of the Middle Weser which formed the basis of the County of Schauenburg.

In 1180 however Adolf defected from Henry, who thereupon drove him from Holstein. Adolf attached himself to Frederick Barbarossa (Emperor Frederick I), with whose help he regained his lordship in 1181 after the fall of Henry. In 1188 however Frederick turned down Adolf's claim to the town of Lübeck. Adolf accompanied him on the Third Crusade. In August 1190 he reached Tyre, where he left the crusading army and returned to Holstein to defend his lands against Henry the Lion, who had in the meantime returned from exile. In 1196, he went to the Holy Land for the second time for the Crusade of Henry VI, he then returned home in 1198.

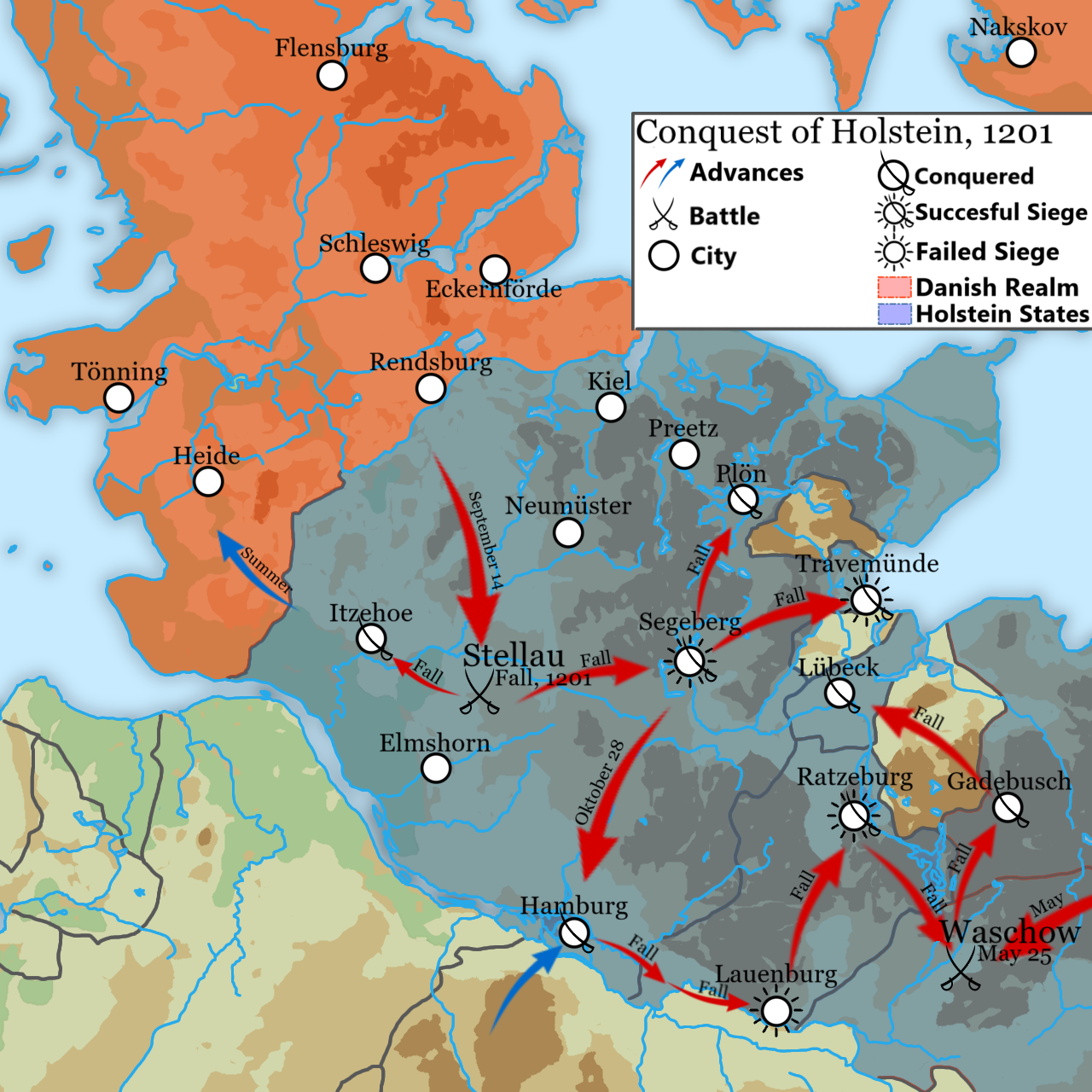
Danish Campaigns in Holstein (1201)

The reign of Adolf III coincided with Denmark's attempts at expansion under Kings Canute VI and his brother and successor Valdemar II. After Adolf lost the Battle of Stellau in 1201 and was later taken prisoner in Hamburg by Valdemar, this expansion was successful for some decades. In captivity Adolf was forced to renounce his title to the County of Holstein in 1203 in order to gain his freedom, and on his release retired to the County of Schauenburg. The reconquest of Holstein was left for his son and heir, Adolf IV of Holstein.

In about 1224, at the request of Konrad von Rüdenberg, Prince-Bishop of Minden, Count Adolf III relinquished the Vogtei of Wennigsen Abbey in Wennigsen. The deed recording this act is the first surviving written record of this monastery.

Count Adolf III married firstly, in 1182, Adelheid of Assel (d. 25 December 1185) and secondly Adelheid of Querfurt.

He had five children:

- Adolf IV
- Konrad
- Bruno of Schauenburg, Bishop of Olmütz
- Mechthilde
- Margarete

== Ancestry ==
Ancestors of Adolf III of Holstein

4. Adolf I of Holstein
2. Adolf II of Holstein
1. Adolf III of Holstein
24. Sizzo II of Schwarzburg
12. Günther I of Schwarzburg-Käfernburg
25. Unknown
6. Sizzo III of Schwarzburg-Käfernburg
26. Yaropolk Izyaslavich
13. Matilda Yaropolkovna of Turov-Pinsk
3. Mechthild of Schwarzburg-Käfernburg
28. Adolf II of Berg
14. Adolf III of Berg
29. Adelaide of Lauffen
7. Gisela of Berg
30. Dietrich II of Cleves
15. Adelaide of Cleves
31. Adelaide of Sulzbach

== Sources ==
- Karl Jansen (1875). "Adolf III., Graf von Holstein" . Allgemeine Deutsche Biographie (in German). Vol. 1. Leipzig: Duncker & Humblot. pp. 107–108.
- Heinz Maybaum (1953). "Adolf III., Graf von Holstein". Neue Deutsche Biographie (in German). Vol. 1. Berlin: Duncker & Humblot. p. 78.
- von Liliencron, Detlev. "Die Schlacht bei Stellau 1201". spiegel.de. Archived from the original on May 2, 2003.

Adolf III of Holstein House of Schauenburg Born: 1160 Died: 3 January 1225
Regnal titles
Preceded by Adolf II	Count of Holstein; 1164–1203	Succeeded by Valdemar II of Denmark
Preceded by Adolf II	Count of Schauenburg; 1164–1225	Succeeded by Adolf IV
