= Holstein-Itzehoe =

European polity

Holstein-Itzehoe was a county that was formed from Schauenburg and Holstein by the division of Holstein between Gerhard and John in 1261.

Gerhard of Holstein-Itzehoe was the only regent. After his death in 1290 Holstein-Itzehoe was divided up between Gerhard's sons into the three counties of Holstein-Rendsburg, Holstein-Plön and Holstein-Pinneberg (the latter ruled in personal union with the County of Schauenburg, thus sometimes called Holstein and Schauenburg, or Holstein-Schauenburg, however Schauenburg was the name of the ruling dynasty in all the then Holsatian counties).

== Rise and fall of the county ==
Holstein
Holstein-Kiel (1261–1390)	Holstein-Itzehoe (1261–1300)
Holstein-Segeberg (1273-1308)
Holstein-Plön (1300–1390)	Holstein-Rendsburg (1300–1459)	Holstein-Pinneberg (1300–1640)
Duchy of Holstein (from 1474)
Imperial County of Rantzau (1650–1726)
