= Holstein-Pinneberg =

European polity

Coordinates: 53°38′N 9°48′E

County of Holstein-Pinneberg County of Schauenburg and Holstein-Pinneberg Grafschaft Holstein-Pinneberg (German) Grafschaft Schauenburg und Holstein-Pinneberg (German)
- 1290–1640
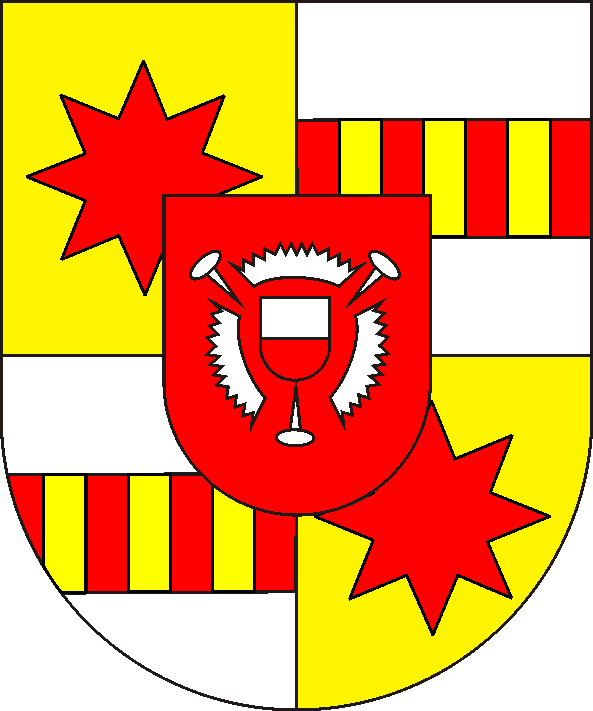
- Coat of arms

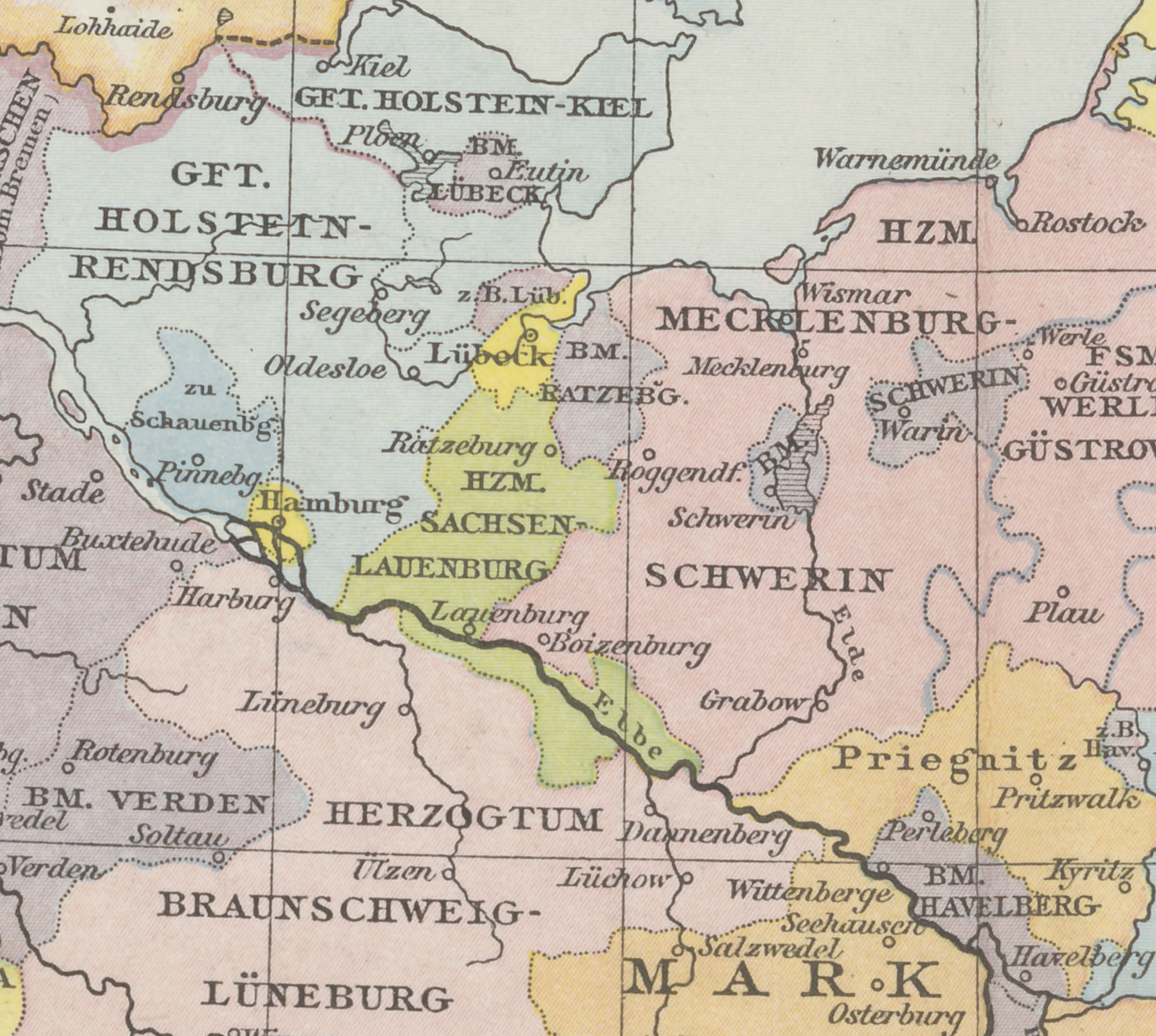
- Holstein-Pinneberg and neighbouring territories around 1400
- Status: Imperial county
- Capital: Pinneberg
- Common languages: Northern Low Saxon, German
- Religion: Roman Catholic to 1561, then mainly Lutheran, Calvinist from 1601 and Jewish from 1621, esp. in Altona
- Government: Monarchy
- Counts of Schauenburg
  - Upper house: House of Schauenburg
- Historical era: Middle Ages
  - Division of Holstein-Itzehoe following death of Gerhard I: 1290
  - Usurpation in 1640 after the comital male line died out: 1640
Preceded by	Succeeded by
Holstein-Itzehoe	Holstein-Glückstadt
- Today part of: Germany

The County of Holstein-Pinneberg (German: Grafschaft Holstein-Pinneberg), also known as the County of Schauenburg and Holstein-Pinneberg (German: Grafschaft Schauenburg und Holstein-Pinneberg), was a small territory which existed from 1290 until 1640, centred around Pinneberg in modern-day Schleswig-Holstein, Germany.

== Rise and fall of the county ==
Holstein-Pinneberg was one of the territories partitioned from the County of Holstein-Itzehoe (the others being Holstein-Rendsburg and Holstein-Plön) following the death of Gerhard I. This resulted in the Pinneberg line of the Counts of Schauenburg and Holstein, who were called Holstein-Pinneberg or Holstein-Schauenburg. The Schauenburgs (later, on the Weser, called the Schaumburgs) ruled over the County of Schaumburg (which became a principality in 1620) and over Holstein-Pinneberg.

In 1375, Prince-Archbishop Albert II of Bremen mortgaged the Haseldorfer Marsh to Adolphus VII. The prince-archbishop of Bremen later failed to redeem the mortgage, and the Haseldorfer Marsh has been part of Holstein ever since. Whereas in 1537 Christian III of Denmark introduced the Reformation in all his four realms, Denmark, Duchy of Holstein, Norway and Schleswig, Holstein-Pinneberg remained Catholic until 1559. After the Schaumburgs died out in 1640 (the other lines in Holstein had already died out by 1459) the County of Schaumburg was divided and the County of Holstein-Pinneberg was absorbed into what was now the Duchy of Holstein (formerly the County of Holstein-Rendsburg). In 1650, the County of Rantzau was created from the northern third of the territory.

Holstein
Holstein-Kiel (1261–1390)	Holstein-Itzehoe (1261–1300)
Holstein-Segeberg (1273-1308)
Holstein-Plön (1300–1390)	Holstein-Rendsburg (1300–1459)	Holstein-Pinneberg (1300–1640)
Duchy of Holstein (from 1474)
Imperial County of Rantzau (1650–1726)

== Counts of Holstein-Pinneberg ==
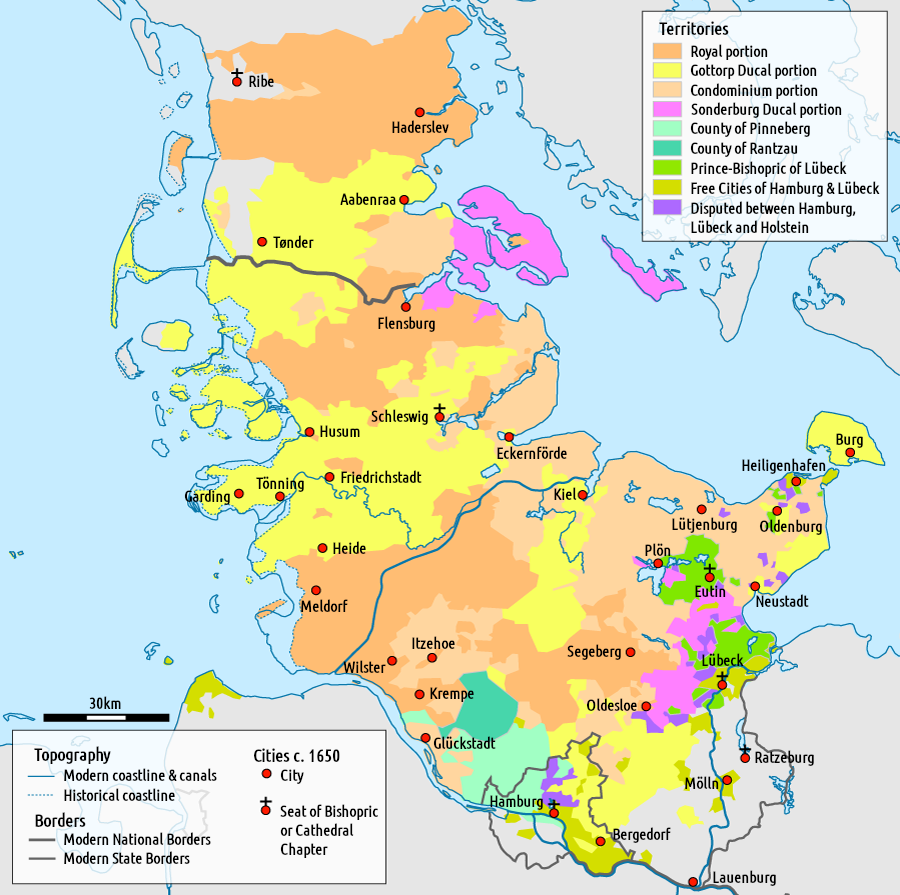
The former County of Holstein-Pinneberg (light and dark turquoise) northwest of Hamburg, here around 1650 the County of Rantzau (dark turquoise) has already been separated out.

The following counts ruled over Schaumburg and Holstein-Pinneberg:

- 1290–1315 Adolphus VI (1256 – 1315)
- 1315–1354 Adolphus VII
- 1354–1370 Adolphus VIII
- 1370–1404 Otto I
- 1404–1426 Adolphus IX
- 1426–1464 Otto II (1400 – 1464)
- 1464–1474 Adolphus X (1419 – 1474)
- 1474–1492 Eric (1420 – 1492)
- 1492–1510 Otto III (1426 – 1510)
- 1510–1526 Antonius (1439 – 1526), married Sophia, daughter of John V, Duke of Saxe-Lauenburg
- 1526–1527 John IV (1449 – 1527)
- 1527–1531 Jobst I (1483 – 1531)
- 1531–1560 John V
- 1531–1581 Jobst II
- 1533–1576 Otto IV (1517 – 1576), Prince-Bishop of Hildesheim 1531–1537 as Otto III
- 1576–1601 Adolphus XI (1547 – 1601)
- 1601–1622 Ernst (1569 – 1622)
- 1622–1635 Jobst Herman (1593 – 1635)
- 1635–1640 Otto V (1616 – 1640)
