= Mechthild of Schwarzburg-Käfernburg =

Mechthild of Schwarzburg-Käfernburg (died 1192), was a countess consort of Holstein by marriage to Adolf II of Holstein. She was the regent of Holstein during the minority of her son Adolf III of Holstein between 1164 and 1174.

She was born to Count Sizzo III of Schwarzburg-Käfernburg.
