= Agnes of Brandenburg =

Queen of Denmark from 1273 to 1286

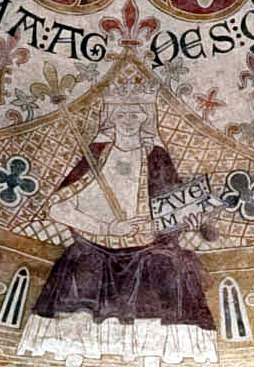
- Fresco of Queen Agnes from the ceiling of St. Bendt's Church, Ringsted

Queen consort of Denmark
- Tenure: 1273–1286
- Born: c. 1257
- Died: 29 September 1304
- Burial: St. Bendt's Church
- Spouse: Eric V, King of Denmark (m. 1273; died 1286) Gerhard II, Count of Holstein-Plön (m. 1293)
- Issue among others...: Eric VI, King of Denmark; Christopher II, King of Denmark; Martha, Queen of Sweden; John III, Count of Holstein-Plön
- House: House of Ascania
- Father: John I, Margrave of Brandenburg
- Mother: Brigitte of Saxony

Agnes of Brandenburg (c. 1257 – 29 September 1304) was the Queen consort of Denmark and Duchess Regnant of Estonia by marriage to King Eric V of Denmark. As a widow, she served as the regent of Denmark for her son, King Eric VI, during his minority from 1286 until 1293.

She and Eric V had seven children, including Eric VI, Christopher II, and Martha of Denmark. Through her second marriage to Gerhard II of Holstein-Plön she also had a son, John III of Holstein-Plön.

== Marriage ==
Agnes was born in approximately 1257 to John I, Margrave of Brandenburg and Brigitte of Saxony, the daughter of Albert I, Duke of Saxony. The Margraviate of Brandenburg had a history of conflict with the Kingdom of Denmark, though regnant Margaret Sambiria fostered an alliance between the two in 1259. When Margaret made a failed attempt to conquer the Duchy of Schleswig in 1261, she and her son Eric V were taken prisoner by the dukes of Holstein. Though Margaret was soon released, Eric V came into the custody of John I, Agnes of Brandenburg's father.

According to legend, Eric V was only released from captivity in 1264 on his promise to marry Agnes without a dowry. Their marriage was likely agreed while the king was being held in captivity, but the long tradition of dynastic marriages between the two houses makes the dowry legend unlikely. In 1269, for example, Eric V's sister Matilda married Agnes' cousin Albert III, Margrave of Brandenburg-Salzwedel.

Agnes married King Eric V of Denmark in Schleswig on 11 November 1273. She and Eric V had seven children, including Richeza (c. 1272–1308), Eric Menved (1274–1319), Christopher (1276–1332), and Martha (c. 1277–1341). Three of their children died in childhood: Katharine, Valdemar, and Elisabeth.

== Regency ==
After her husband's assassination in 1286, Agnes became queen dowager. Her eldest son, Eric Menved, had already been declared the heir, but to secure the throne for her 12-year-old son, she established a guardian government with Vitslav II, Prince of Rügen, Peder Nielsen Hoseøl, and other supporters of her late husband. During the minority of her son, Agnes then became Regent of Denmark. Few details of her regency are known, as it is hard to determine which of the interim government's decisions were made by her, and which were made by the council at large.

As regent in 1287, Agnes made efforts to have those accused of her husband's assassination, including Stig Andersen Hvide, sentenced as outlaws. During her regency, Agnes issued royal documents as her son's deputy and appeared to have control over the crown's revenues and resources. There are also records of her administrating the Duchy of Estonia under her name directly.

As regent, she made strategic alliances to secure her son's position: gaining support from her brothers Otto IV and Konrad of Brandenburg, maintaining relations with Lübeck and the Duchy of Schleswig, and attempting to reconcile relations with Norway. In 1288, she negotiated a marriage alliance for her son, whereby he was to marry princess Ingeborg Magnusdotter of Sweden.

== Later life ==
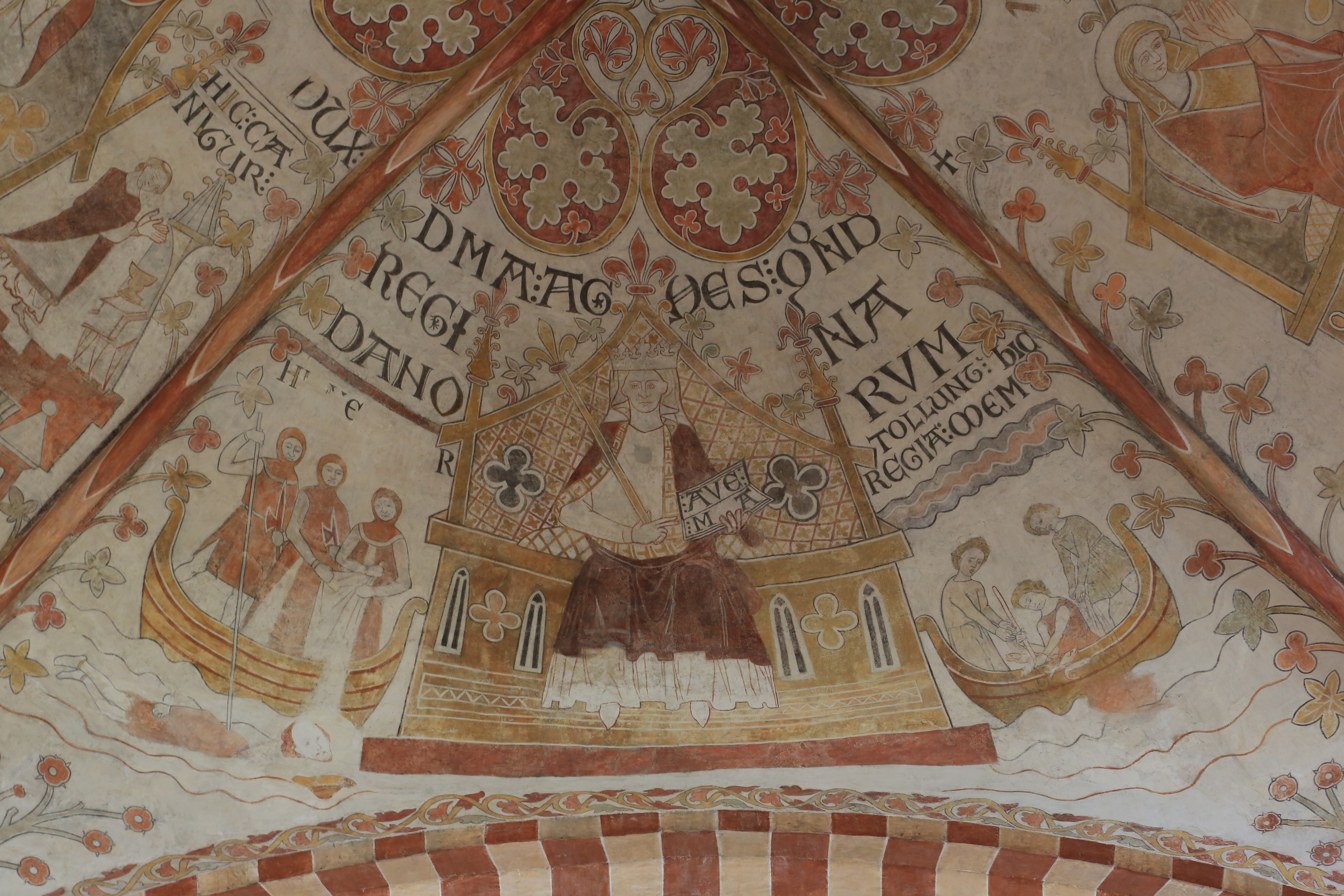
Fresco of Agnes of Brandenburg at St. Bendt's Church, Ringsted, painted in 1290.

Her son was declared of legal majority in 1293, thus ending her formal regency. That year, she married Gerhard II of Holstein-Plön. It is likely that their marriage was another strategic alliance to secure her son's position. Despite becoming the Countess of Holstein-Plön through her second marriage, she regularly returned to Denmark. As queen dowager she likely secured the rights to royal properties and may have been granted Lolland and Falster as life estates.

Agnes and Gerhard had a son, John III, Count of Holstein-Plön, in approximately 1297. She died on 29 September 1304 and was buried at St. Bendt's Church in Ringsted, Denmark. She had financed a large fresco in the church in 1290, painted onto the vault of the church's transept. In the fresco, she is depicted on the throne as the head of state.

Agnes of Brandenburg House of Ascania Born: circa 1257 Died: 29 September 1304
Danish royalty
Preceded by Margaret Sambiria	Queen consort of Denmark; 1273–1286	Succeeded by Ingeborg Magnusdotter of Sweden
