= John III of Holstein-Plön =

John III, Count of Holstein-Plön
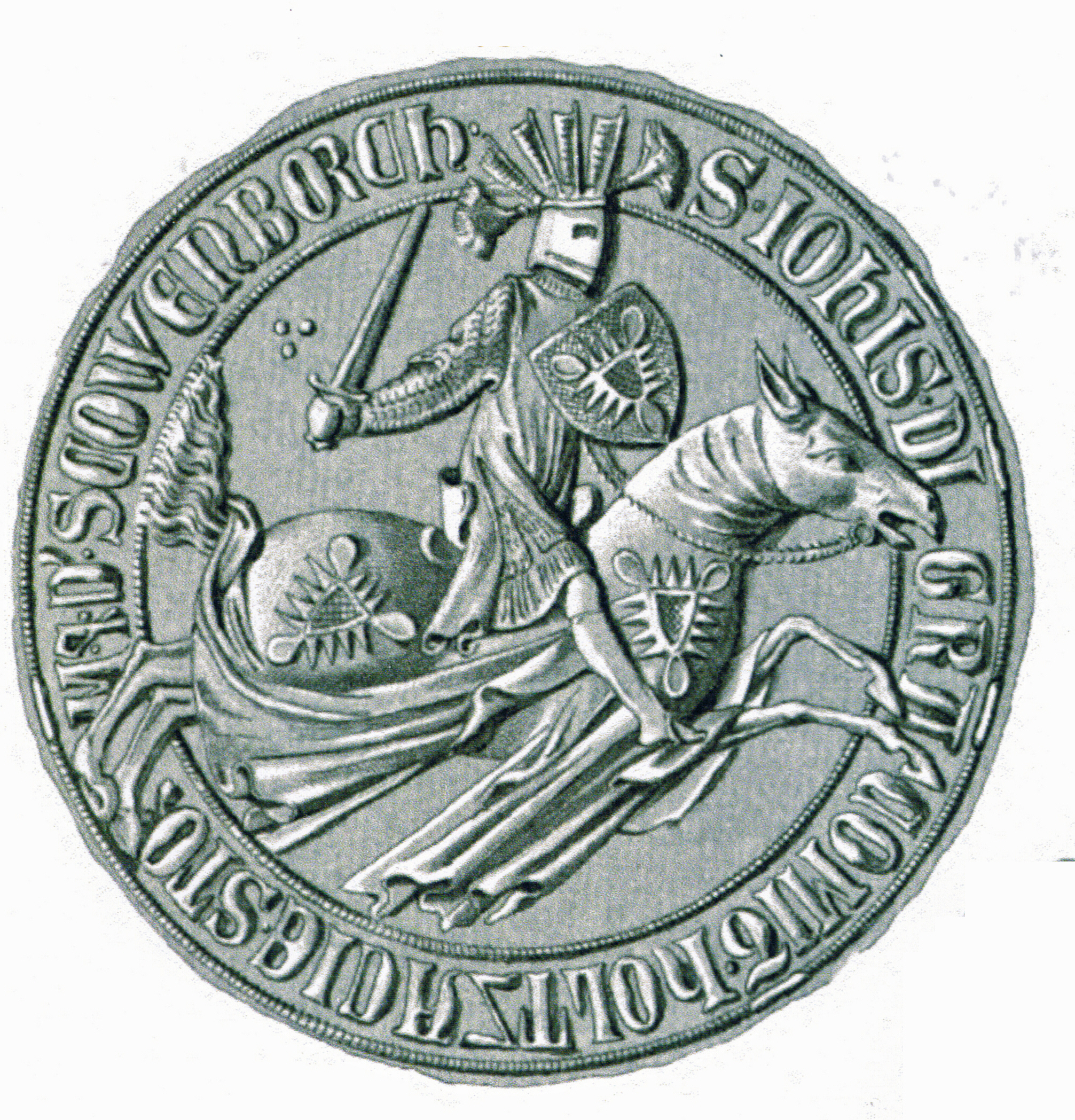
- Seal of John the Mild of Holstein-Kiel, c. 1323-1350; Graf von Holstein-Kiel (1316–1359); Graf von Holstein-Plön (1350–1359)
- Born: c. 1297
- Died: 27 September 1359
- Noble family: House of Schaumburg
- Spouses: Catherine of Silesia-Glogau; Merislawa of Schwerin-Wittenburg
- Issue Detail: Adolph IX, Count of Holstein-Kiel; Agnes of Holstein
- Father: Gerhard II, Count of Holstein-Plön
- Mother: Agnes of Brandenburg

John III of Holstein-Plön (c. 1297–1359), called John the Mild, was a Count of Schauenburg and Holstein-Plön and Holstein-Kiel, ruling Holstein-Plön (1312–1316 and again 1350–1359) and Holstein-Kiel (1316–1359). Together with Count Gerhard III of Holstein-Rendsburg, John III was the lord ruling in guardianship the Danish Duchy of Schleswig 1332–1340. He was known as “John the Mild”.

== Life ==
He was the son of Count Gerhard II the Blind of Holstein-Plön and of the Danish Queen Dowager Agnes of Brandenburg, a fact that made him a maternal half-brother of Eric VI and Christopher II. In 1312 John and his paternal half-brother Gerhard IV succeeded their father as co-ruling counts of Holstein-Plön. In 1316 John III inherited Holstein-Kiel from his father's cousin John II the One-Eyed and thus left Holstein-Plön for his brother Gerhard IV as sole ruler. A wealthy man by inheritance John very early acted as a powerful local prince funding Danish warfare and co-operating with his first cousin Gerhard III.

His financial support of the Danish kings quickly made him one of their leading creditors with his chief possession in Funen. During the rebellion against Christopher II 1326 John supported Gerhard III and the Danish magnates and enlarged his Danish possessions. The growing rivalry between John III and Gerhard III led him to support the restoration of his half-brother Christopher II as king in 1330, but in 1331 a co-operative effort against Gerhard III by the half-brothers ended in defeat. John politically survived this setback but had to accept Gerhard III as his superior.

From 1332 to 1340 John was the master of Denmark east of the Great Belt. However, by 1332 he lost Scania which rebelled against the German rule and submitted to the Swedish king. Though a supposed co-ruler with Gerhard III, John did not play a very great political role and preferred to concentrate on his economic profit – like Gerhard III he was pestered by his own minor creditors. After Gerhard III's death and the collapse of Holstein-Rendsburg's rule in 1340, John at first co-operated with King Valdemar IV in order to get his money back but during the following years all his Danish possessions were lost through wars and unfavorable economic transactions.

In 1350 his nephew, Gerhard V, Count of Holstein-Plön, bequeathed Holstein-Plön to John. At his death, his German possessions of Holstein-Plön and Holstein-Kiel were inherited by his son Adolph IX.

In Danish tradition John is overshadowed by Gerhard III as a Holstein ruler in Denmark. In fact not much is known about John's character but he seems to have been a clever diplomat whose ambitions owing to circumstances were gradually limited to economic demands.

== Seals ==
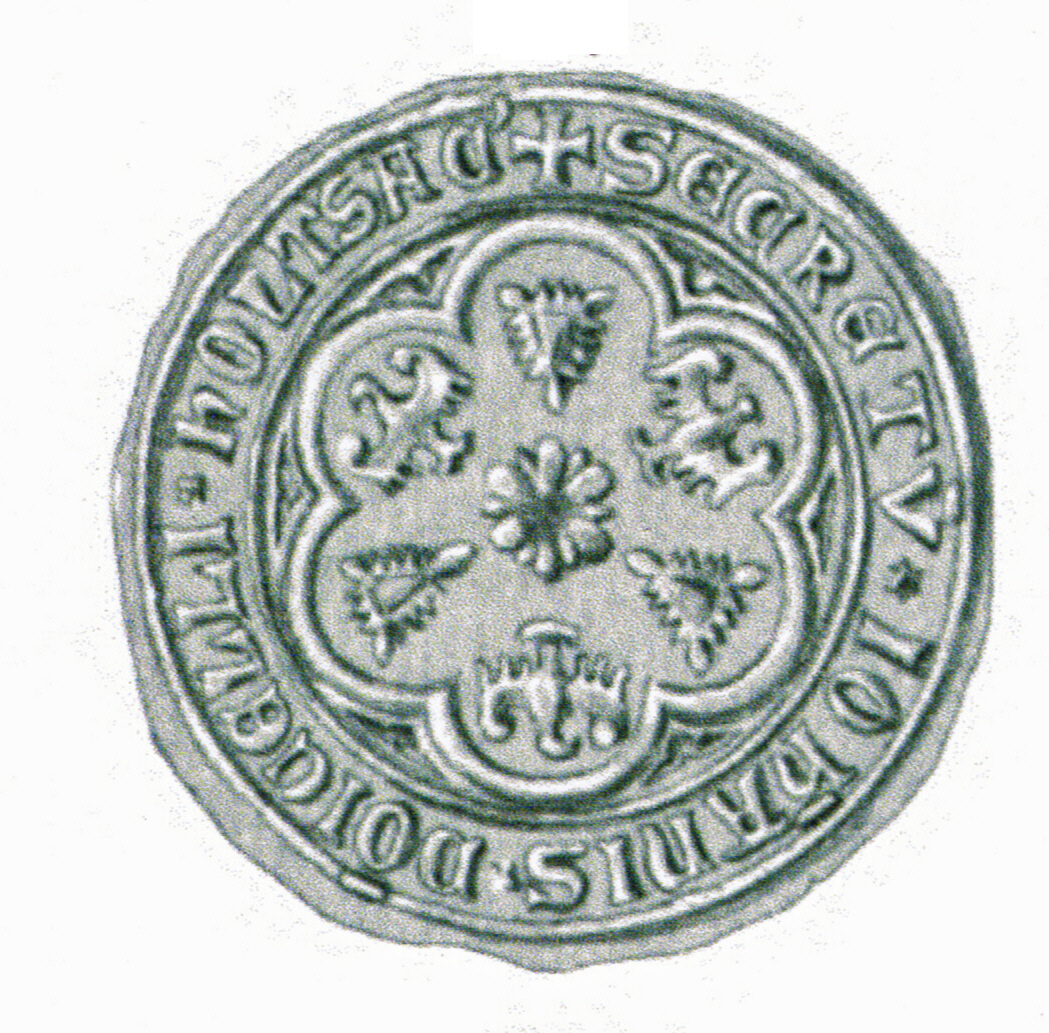
Seal of Johann III of Holstein-Kiel, c. 1309-1317

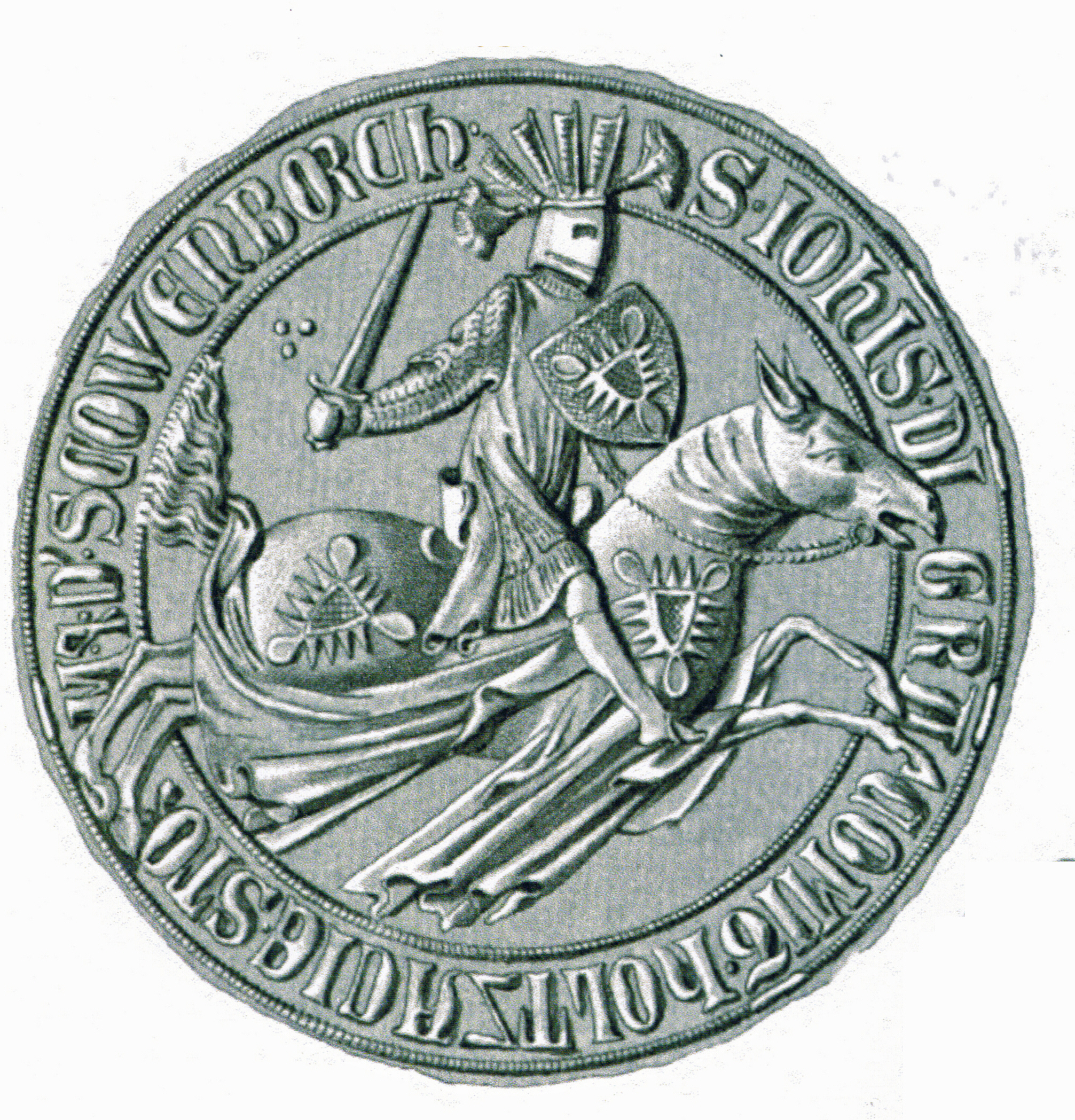
Seal of Johann III of Holstein-Kiel, c. 1319-1357

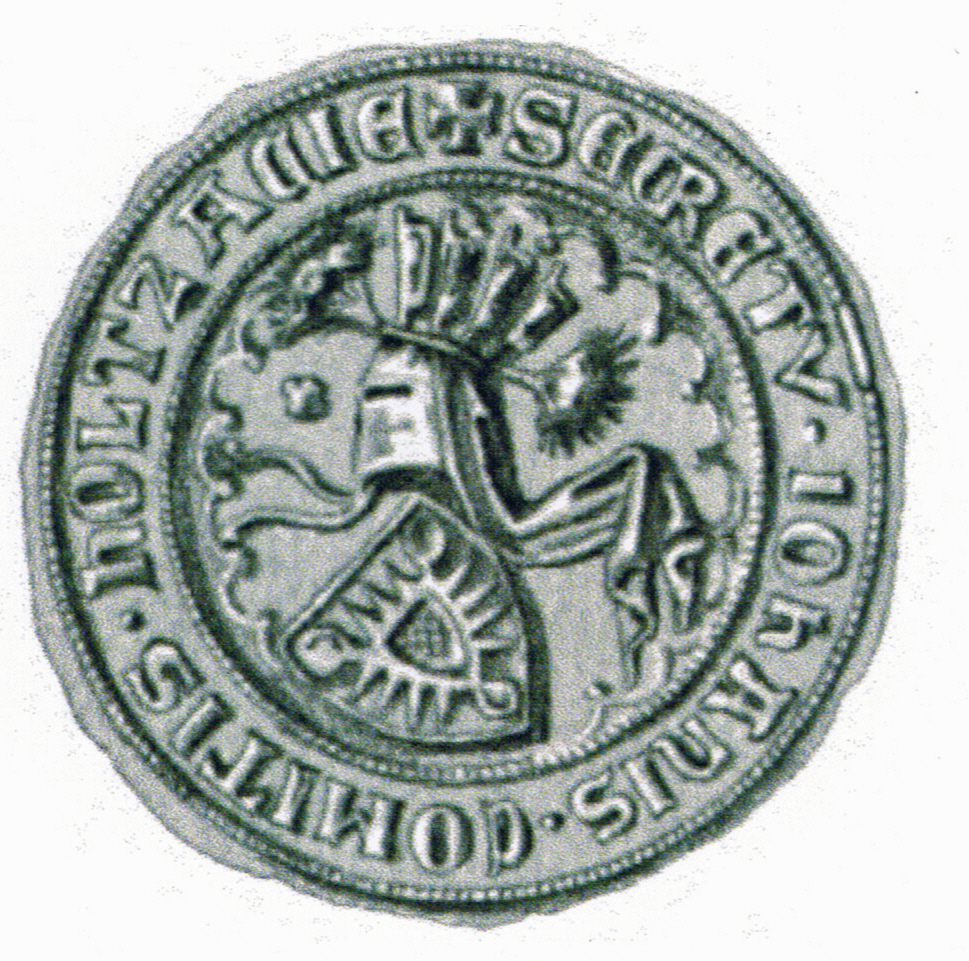
Seal of Johann III of Holstein-Kiel, c. 1323-1350

== Marriage and issue ==
John III married on 27 January 1319 Catherine (c. 1300–1323), widow of John V, Margrave of Brandenburg-Salzwedel and daughter of Matilda of Brunswick and Lunenburg (Wolfenbüttel) and Henry III, Duke of Silesia-Glogau. Catherine and John had the following children:

- Adolphus IX of Schauenburg and Holstein-Plön (d. 1390)
- Agnes of Schauenburg and Holstein-Plön (d. 1386) married Duke Eric II of Saxe-Lauenburg in 1342 or 1349.
- Matilda (Mechthild) of Schauenburg and Holstein-Plön married (after 1341) Nicholas III, Lord of Werle-Güstrow, Prince of Wenden
- Elisabeth of Schauenburg and Holstein-Plön married in 1341 Bernard II, Lord of Werle-Waren, brother of Nicholas III.

In second marriage his spouse was Merislawa of Schwerin-Wittenburg, daughter of Nicolotus I, Count of Schwerin-Wittenburg.

John III, the Mild House of Schaumburg Born: ca. 1297 Died: 27 September 1359
Regnal titles
Preceded by Gerhard II the Blind	Count of Holstein-Plön; 1312–1316 with his brother Gerhard IV (1312–1323)	Succeeded by Gerhard IV
Preceded by John II the One-Eyed	Count of Holstein-Kiel; 1316–1359	Succeeded by Adolphus IX (aka VII)
Preceded by Gerhard V	Count of Holstein-Plön; 1350–1359	Holstein-Plön merged into Holstein-Kiel
