= Holstein-Rendsburg =

County of Holstein-Rendsburg Grafschaft Holstein-Rendsburg
- 1290–1459
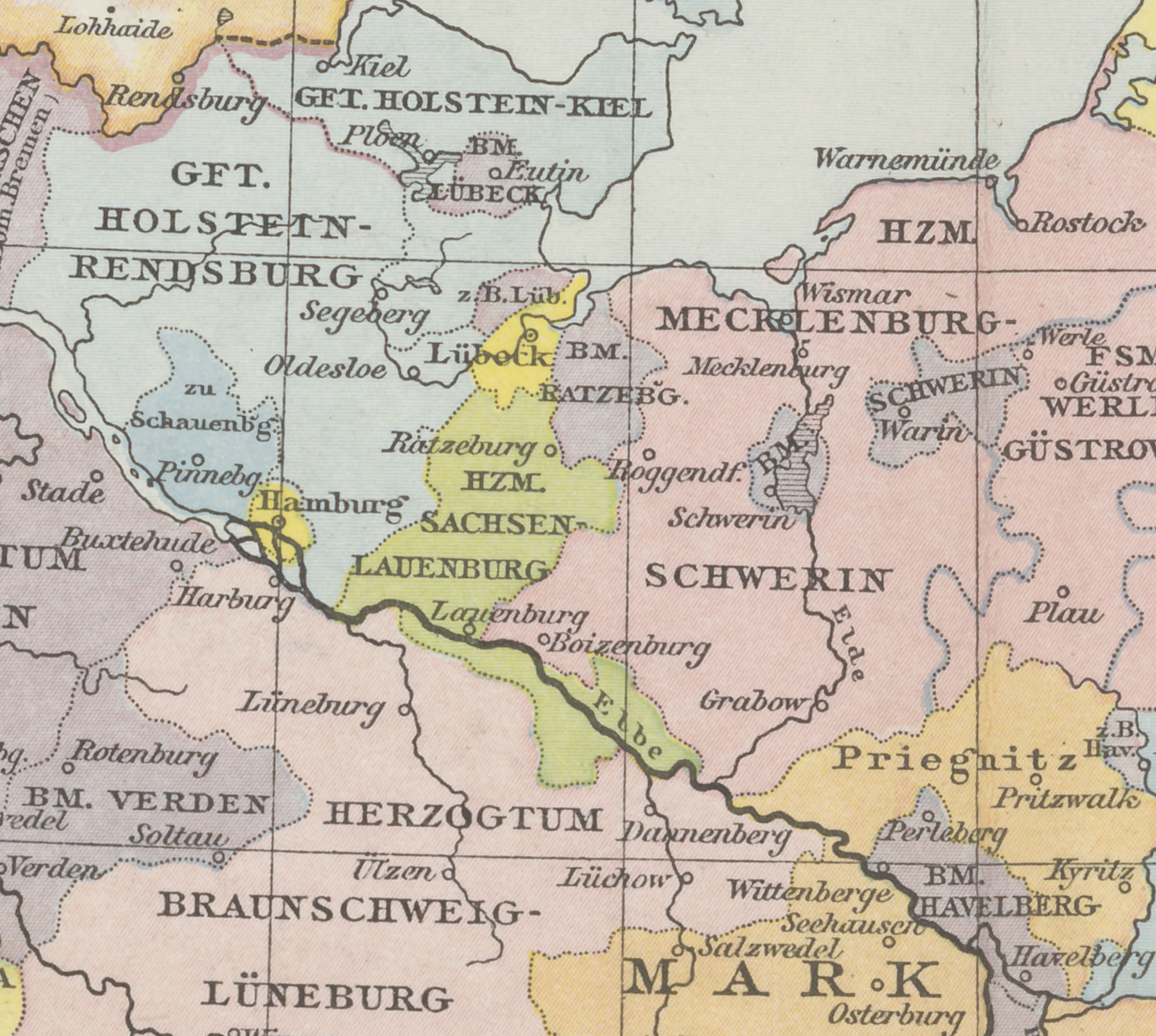
- Holstein-Rendsburg and neighbouring territories around 1400
- Status: imperial county
- Government: monarchy
- Historical era: Middle Ages
  - Established: 1290
  - Disestablished: 1459
Preceded by	Succeeded by
Holstein-Itzehoe	Duchy of Holstein

Holstein-Rendsburg is the name of a county that existed from 1290 to 1459, ruled by a line of the Schauenburg family.

== History ==
The Schauenburgs had ruled in Holstein since 1110/1111. In 1290, when Count Gerhard I of Holstein-Itzehoe died, his portion of Holstein was divided into 3 parts. From this emerged the counties of Holstein-Plön, Holstein-Pinneberg and Holstein-Rendsburg. The house of Shauenburg in Holstein gradually acquired large estates, including much of Shleswig, which was mortgaged to them by the Danish crown. By 1330s, almost the entire Danish kingdom was mortgaged to the Holstein counts.

Shortly after the Danish nobleman Niels Ebbesen killed the Holstein ruler, Count Gerhard III, an agreement was reached that elevated Valdemar Atterdag to the Danish throne. The Holstein counts continued to consolidate their power, and in 1386, Duke Gerhard VI recognized Schleswig as a duchy belonging to the Danish Crown as a fief.

Following Gerhard VI's death in 1404, King Erik of Pomerania attempted to seize control of Schleswig, leading to a protracted war. The Holstein counts were supported by Hanseatic towns, notably Lübeck and Hamburg, and in 1432 they forced King Erik to accept a truce that confirmed Holstein rule in Schleswig.

The counts ruled the territory until the last descendant of the House of Schauenburg to hold the title, Adolphus VIII (also known as Duke Adolf VIII), died childless in 1459. The Schauenburgs had almost died out; only the line of Holstein-Pinneberg still existed, but their count, Otto II of Schaumburg, was not able to secure his inheritance. Instead, the united Schleswig-Holstein Knighthood feared a renewed dispute over Schleswig and decided to elect Adolphus VIII's nephew, King Christian I of Denmark, as the new ruler.

During a major assembly in Ribe in 1460, Christian I became the ruler of both Schleswig and Holstein. He was offered the title of Duke of Schleswig and Count of Holstein on the explicit condition that the two territories remain "Forever undivided" ("ewich tosammede ungedelt"). Later, in 1474, the emperor elevated Holstein's status from a county to a duchy.

Holstein
Holstein-Kiel (1261–1390)	Holstein-Itzehoe (1261–1300)
Holstein-Segeberg (1273-1308)
Holstein-Plön (1300–1390)	Holstein-Rendsburg (1300–1459)	Holstein-Pinneberg (1300–1640)
Duchy of Holstein (from 1474)
Imperial County of Rantzau (1650–1726)

== Counts of Holstein-Rendsburg ==
The following counts ruled over Holstein-Rendsburg or Holstein:

- 1290–1304 Henry I (1258 – 1304)
- 1304–1340 Gerhard III the Great (ca. 1293 – 1340), Duke of Schleswig
- 1340–1382 Henry II, nicknamed Iron Henry (1317 – 1384?)
- 1382–1397 Nicholas, a.k.a. Claus of Holstein (ca. 1321 – 1397)
- 1397–1403 Albert II (d. 1403)
- 1403–1404 Gerhard VI (d. 1404)
- 1404–1421 Henry III (d. 1421)
- 1421–1427 Henry IV (1397 – 1427)
- 1427–1433 Gerhard VII (1404 – 1433), Duke of Schleswig
- 1427–1459 Adolphus VIII (1401 – 1459), Duke of Schleswig
