= Adolf IV of Holstein =

Adolf IV

Count of Holstein
- Reign: 1227 - 1238
- Predecessor: Valdemar II of Denmark
- Successor: Gerhard I John

Count of Schauenburg
- Reign: 1225 - 1238
- Predecessor: Adolf III
- Successor: Gerhard I
- Born: before 1205
- Died: 8 July 1261 the Franciscan Friary in Kiel
- Spouse: Heilwig of Lippe
- Issue: Mechtild, Queen of Denmark; John I, Count of Holstein-Kiel; Gerhard I, Count of Holstein-Itzehoe; Ludolf
- House: House of Schauenburg
- Father: Adolf III, Count of Holstein
- Mother: Adelheid of Querfurt

Adolf IV (before 1205 – 8 July 1261) was a Count of Schauenburg (1225–1238) and of Holstein (1227–1238), of the House of Schaumburg. Adolf was the eldest son of Adolf III of Schauenburg and Holstein by his second wife, Adelheid of Querfurt.

== Life ==
Adolf IV won several victories against the Danes. In 1225 he won the Battle of Mölln against Albert II, Count of Weimar-Orlamünde. On 22 July 1227 with his coalition army Adolf was victorious in the Battle of Bornhöved against King Valdemar II of Denmark with his Danish army and German allies (the Welfs), and thus regained Holstein. In 1235 he founded Kiel and in 1238 Itzehoe. In 1238 he took part in a crusade in Livonia.

In fulfilment of an oath taken during the heat of the Battle of Bornhöved, Adolf withdrew in 1238 to a Franciscan friary and in 1244 was ordained a priest in Rome (his two under-age sons passed into the guardianship of his son-in-law Duke Abel of Schleswig). Also in 1244 he founded Neustadt in Holstein. He died in 1261 in the Franciscan friary in Kiel, which he himself had founded, whereupon Holstein was divided between his sons John (of Holstein-Kiel) and Gerhard (of Holstein-Itzehoe).

== Marriage and issue ==
Adolf married Heilwig of Lippe, daughter of Herman II, Lord of Lippe. They had:

- Mechthild (1225–1288), married firstly in 1237 Abel of Denmark, Duke of Schleswig and later King of Denmark (this marriage provided the basis for later claims by the Schauenburgers on the Duchy of Schleswig); and secondly Birger Jarl, Regent of Sweden
- John I, Count of Holstein-Kiel (1229–1263)
- Gerhard I, Count of Holstein-Itzehoe (1232–1290)
- Ludolf, d. in childhood

== Sources ==
- Nicholson, Helen J. (2023). Women and the Crusades. Oxford University Press.
- Signori, Gabriela (2003). "Heiliges Westfalen": Heilige, Reliquien, Wallfahrt und Wunder im Mittelalter (in German). Verlag für Regionalgeschichte.
- Allgemeine Deutsche Biographie 1875, vol 1, p 108 (digital version de.wikisource): Adolf IV. (Graf von Holstein) (in German)
- Neue deutsche Biographie, vol. 1, Berlin, 1953 Adolf IV., Graf von Holstein (article by Heinz Maybaum) (in German)

Adolf IV of Holstein House of Schauenburg Born: before 1205 Died: 8 July 1261
Regnal titles
Preceded by Valdemar II of Denmark	Count of Holstein; 1227–1238	Succeeded by John I and Gerhard I
Preceded by Adolf III	Count of Schauenburg; 1225–1238	Succeeded by John I and Gerhard I
