= Stormarn (gau) =

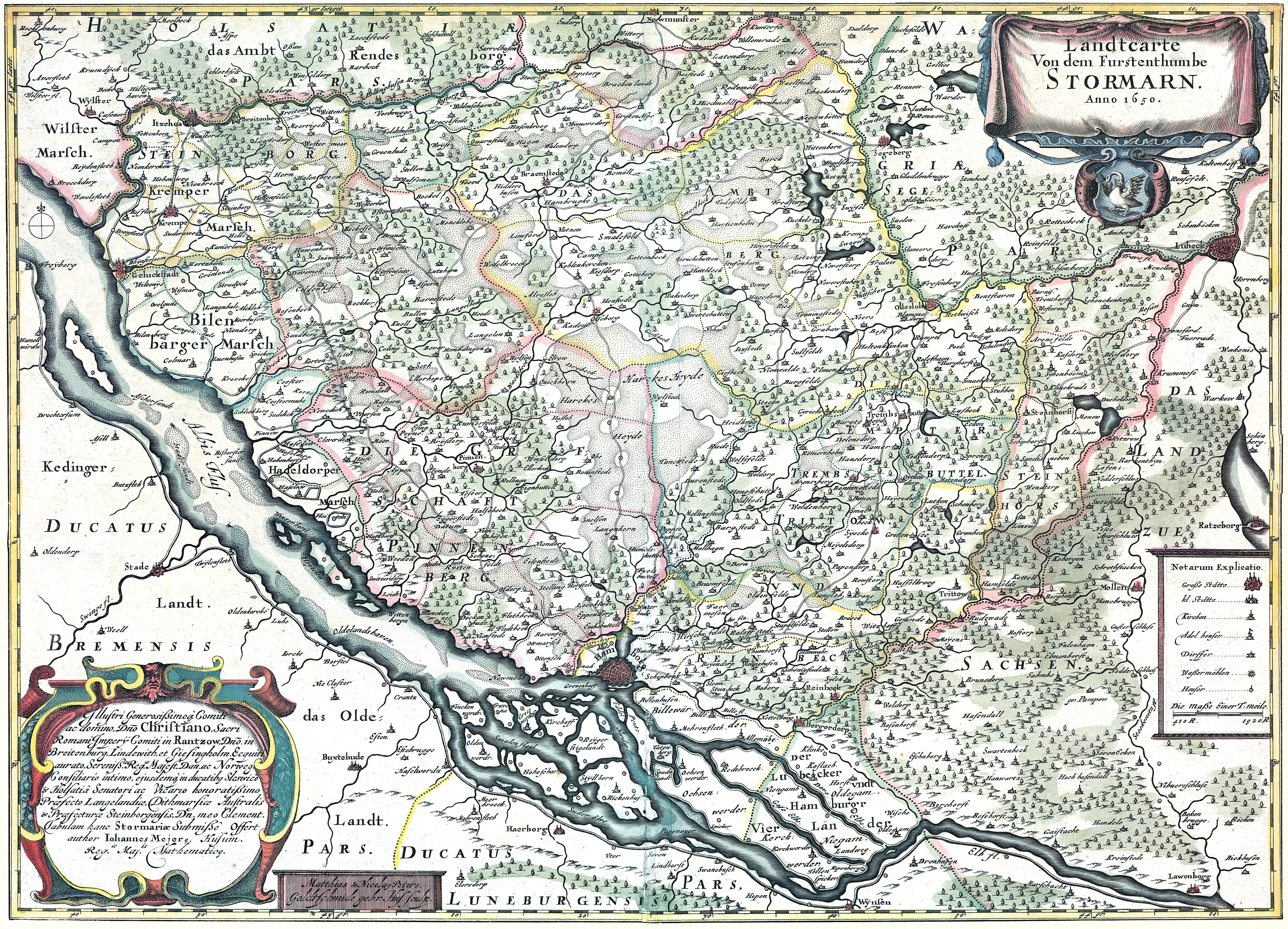
Stormarn with its 1650 borders

Stormarn (German pronunciation: [ˈʃtɔʁmaʁn]) was a gau which, alongside Holstein and Dithmarschen, was one of the three Northern Albingian Saxon gaus.

The Gau of Stormarn lay in the southeast of Schleswig-Holstein. As well as the present county of Stormarn it also covered the territory of present-day Pinneberg, part of Steinburg, parts of Segeberg and the present land of the Hanseatic city of Hamburg north of the Elbe. The "Stormarni" were recorded in documents from the 11th century, like the Hamburg Church History (Hamburgische Kirchengeschichte) by Adam of Bremen. The document refers to the Stormarni as one of the Saxon tribes.
