= Gerhard VI of Holstein-Rendsburg =

Gerhard VI, Count of Holstein
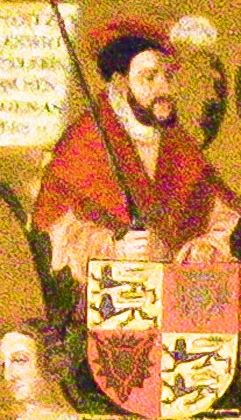
- Born: c. 1367
- Died: 1404
- Noble family: Schauenburg
- Spouse: Catherine Elisabeth of Brunswick-Lüneburg
- Issue: Ingeborg of Holstein; Henry IV, Count of Holstein-Rendsburg; Hedvig of Holstein; Adolf VIII, Count of Holstein; Gerhard VII, Count of Holstein-Rendsburg
- Father: Henry II, Count of Holstein-Rendsburg
- Mother: Ingeborg of Mecklenburg-Schwerin

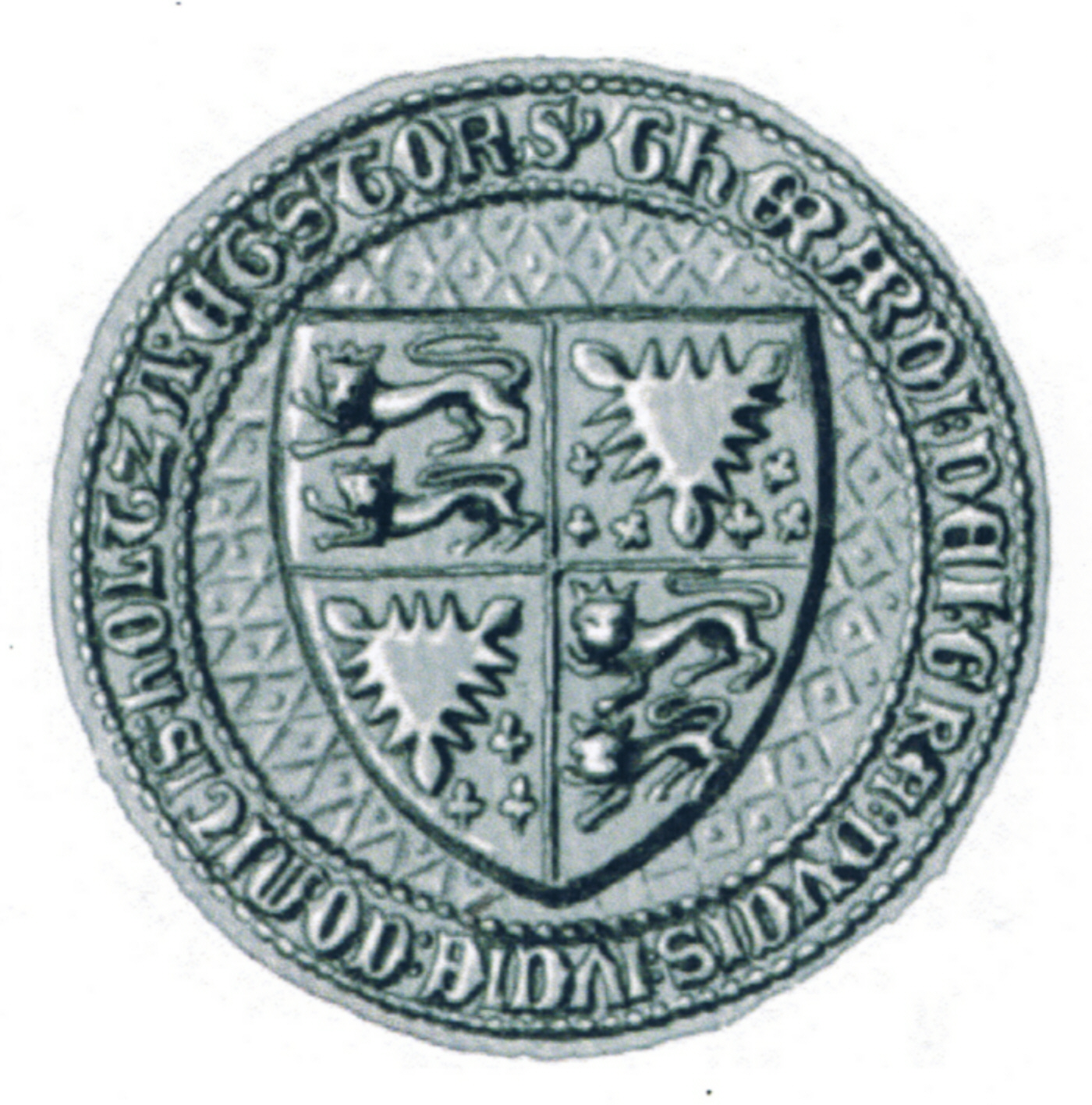
Seal of Gerhard VI dating to about 1392

Gerhard VI (c. 1367–1404) was the Count of Holstein-Rendsburg from 1382, and Duke of Schleswig as of 1386.

Gerhard VI was born around 1367, the son of Count Henry II from the Rendsburg line of the House of Schauenburg and Ingeborg of Mecklenburg. After the death, in 1381 or 1384, of his father, who had ruled jointly with Gerhard's uncle Nicholas (Claus), Gerhard and his younger brother Albert II entered into the joint government for their late father. On 15 September 1386 King Olav III of Denmark enfeoffed him with the Duchy of Schleswig, after his uncle Nicholas had resigned from that function.

In 1390 Gerhard and his brother and uncle inherited Holstein-Kiel, including the merged Plön, whose line had been extinct in 1350. After their uncle Nicholas had died in 1397 the brothers divided their possessions, the elder keeping Schleswig and Holstein-Rendsburg, and Albert II receiving Holstein-Segeberg as secundogeniture. In 1403 Gerhard regained Segeberg by way of reversion upon Albert's death in action against Ditmarsh, thus ruling almost the whole of Holstein except of Holstein-Pinneberg. The Duchy of Schleswig and the County of Holstein-Rendsburg were then under one ruler. He fell in the Battle on the Hamme on 4 August 1404 during another attempt to subjugate Ditmarsh.

== Family ==
In 1391 Gerhard married Catherine Elisabeth of Brunswick-Lüneburg, daughter of Magnus II of Brunswick-Lüneburg. They had the following children:

- Henry IV (b. 1397; d. 1427), Duke of Schleswig, Count of Holstein
- Ingeborg (b. 1398; d. 1465), abbess of Vadstena
- Hedvig (b. ca. 1400; d. ca. 1436), married Dietrich of Oldenburg, mother of Christian I, King of Denmark.
- Adolphus VIII (b. 1401; d. 1459), Duke of Schleswig, Count of Holstein
- Gerhard VII (b. 1404; d. 1433), Duke of Schleswig, Count of Holstein

== See also ==
- List of rulers of Schleswig-Holstein

== Sources ==
- Karl Jansen (1878). "Gerhard VI" . Allgemeine Deutsche Biographie (in German). Vol. 8. Leipzig: Duncker & Humblot. pp. 740–741.

Gerhard VI of Holstein-Rendsburg House of Schauenburg Born: about 1367 Died: 4 August 1404
Danish nobility
Preceded by Nicholas	Duke of Schleswig as Gerhard II; 1386–1404	Succeeded by Henry III
German nobility
Preceded by Henry II and Nicholas as Counts of Holstein-Rendsburg	Count of Holstein-Rendsburg; 1384–1404 with Nicholas (1384–1397); Albert II (1384–1397)	Succeeded by Henry III
