= Elizabeth of Denmark, Duchess of Mecklenburg =

Duchess of Mecklenburg-Schwerin and Mecklenburg-Güstrow

Elizabeth of Denmark
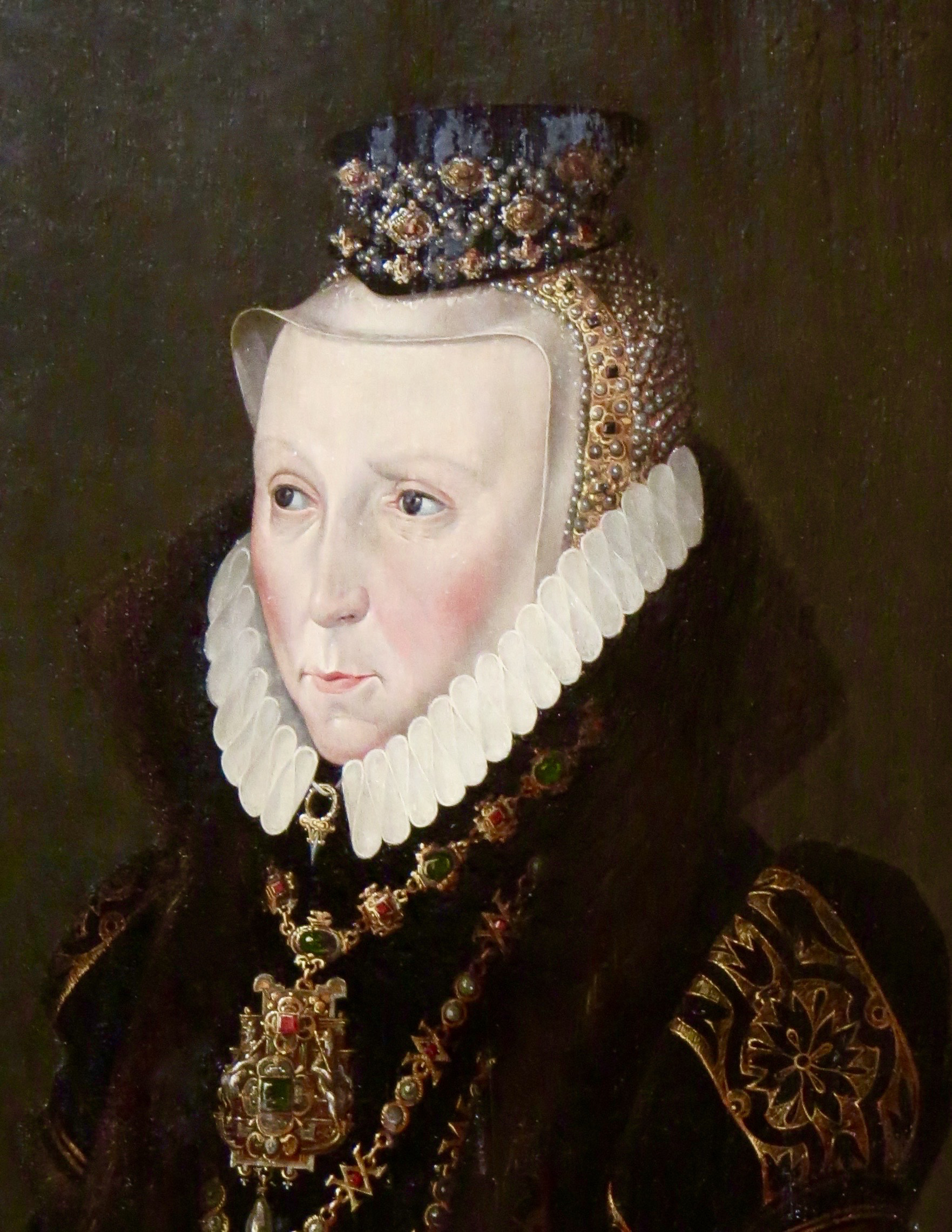
- Portrait by Cornelius Krommeny, 1578
- Born: 14 October 1524; Denmark
- Died: 15 October 1586 (aged 62)
- Spouses: Magnus III, Duke of Mecklenburg-Schwerin; Ulrich III of Mecklenburg-Güstrow
- Issue: Sophie, Queen of Denmark and Norway
- House: Oldenburg
- Father: Frederick I of Denmark
- Mother: Sophie of Pomerania

Elisabeth of Denmark (14 October 1524 – 15 October 1586) was a Danish princess and a Duchess of Mecklenburg-Schwerin and later of Mecklenburg-Güstrow through marriage. She was the elder daughter of King Frederick I of Denmark and his second wife Sophie of Pomerania.

== Biography ==
Elizabeth was raised at the royal Danish court of her half brother and described as an extraordinary beauty. In 1542 she was engaged, and on 26 August 1543 Elizabeth was married to Duke Magnus III of Mecklenburg-Schwerin (4 July 1509 – 28 January 1550). This marriage was childless. She returned to Denmark in 1551 and stayed there until her second marriage in 1556.

Secondly, she married on 14 February 1556 Duke Ulrich III of Mecklenburg-Güstrow and had the only daughter Sophie, who married King Frederick II of Denmark in 1572. Her relationship to Ulrich is described as a happy one.

Elizabeth made frequent visits to the Danish royal court, and also to her former sister in law queen dowager Dorothea. After her daughter became Queen of Denmark in 1572, her visits to Denmark became longer. She is described as kind, sensible, religious and practical. She was also active in Mecklenburg-Güstrow: she reconstructed the churches in Güstrow and Doberan and protected hospitals and convents. She died on return from one of her visits to Denmark.

== Legacy ==
Elizabeth's granddaughter Anne of Denmark married King James I of England. Thus every British monarch since has been her direct descendant, with the present King Charles III being king of 15 independent nations.

== Ancestry ==
Ancestors of Elizabeth of Denmark, Duchess of Mecklenburg

16. Christian V of Oldenburg
8. Dietrich, Count of Oldenburg
17. Agnes of Hohnstein-Heringen
4. Christian I of Denmark
18. Gerhard VI of Holstein-Rendsburg
9. Hedvig of Holstein
19. Catherine Elisabeth of Brunswick-Lüneburg
2. Frederick I of Denmark
20. Frederick I of Brandenburg
10. John, Margrave of Brandenburg-Kulmbach
21. Elisabeth of Bavaria
5. Dorothea of Brandenburg
22. Rudolph III of Saxe-Wittenberg
11. Barbara of Saxe-Wittenberg
23. Barbara of Legnica
1. Elizabeth of Denmark
24. Wartislaw IX of Pomerania
12. Eric II of Pomerania
25. Sophia of Saxe-Lauenburg
6. Bogislaw X of Pomerania
26. Bogislaw IX of Pomerania
13. Sophie of Pomerania
27. Maria of Masovia
3. Sophie of Pomerania
28. Władysław II Jagiełło of Poland
14. Casimir IV of Poland
29. Sophia of Halshany
7. Anna of Poland
30. Albert II of Germany
15. Elisabeth of Austria
31. Elizabeth of Luxembourg

== Literature ==
- Elisabeth, Hertuginde av Meklenborg. In: Dansk biografisk leksikon. Vol. 4, pp. 497f. (digitalised)
- Grewolls, Grete (2011). Wer war wer in Mecklenburg und Vorpommern. Das Personenlexikon (in German). Rostock: Hinstorff Verlag. p. 2457. ISBN 978-3-356-01301-6.
