= Gerhard VI of Oldenburg =

Count of Oldenburg

Gerhard VI "the Quarrelsome"
- Count of Oldenburg
- Coat of arms of Gerhard VI
- Born: 1430
- Died: 22 February 1500 (aged 69–70)
- Noble family: House of Oldenburg
- Spouse: Adelheid of Tecklenburg
- Issue: Gerhard of Oldenburg; Dietrich of Oldenburg; Adolph, Count of Oldenburg-Delmenhorst; Christian of Oldenburg; John V, Count of Oldenburg; Otto of Oldenburg; Elisabeth of Oldenburg; Anna of Oldenburg; Irmgard von Esens, Countess of Harlingerland; Hedwig of Oldenburg; Adelheid of Oldenburg
- Father: Dietrich of Oldenburg
- Mother: Hedvig of Holstein

Gerhard VI, Count of Oldenburg (German: Gerhard (Gerd) der Mutige von Oldenburg; 1430 – 22 February 1500) was a Count of Oldenburg and regent of Bad Zwischenahn in 1440–1482.

== Biography ==
Gerhard was the third son of Dietrich of Oldenburg and his wife, Hedvig of Holstein. His eldest brother first succeeded their father and later was elected King Christian I of Denmark in 1448, therefore passing on the county to his brothers in 1450. From 1440 to 1463 Gerhard VI ruled in Delmenhorst as regent and from 1464 to 1482 (after the death of his brother Maurice) as the guardian of his nephew Jakob. He was constantly at war with Gerhard III, Prince-Archbishop of Bremen, and Frisians. In 1483 Gerhard was compelled to abdicate in favor of his sons, and he died whilst on a pilgrimage in the Rhône valley.

== Family and children ==
In 1453 he married with Adelheid of Tecklenburg (c. 1435 – 2 March 1477), daughter of Otto VII, Count of Tecklenburg. They had eleven children:

- Gerhard of Oldenburg (1454–1470)
- Dietrich of Oldenburg (c. 1456 – 1463)
- Adolph, Count of Oldenburg-Delmenhorst (1458 – 17 February 1500)
- Christian of Oldenburg (1459 – 27 May 1492)
- John V, Count of Oldenburg (1460 – 10 February 1526)
- Otto of Oldenburg (d. 17 February 1500), a canon of Bremen Cathedral Chapter
- Elisabeth of Oldenburg (1468 – 12 September 1505)
- Anna of Oldenburg (1469 – 26 September 1505)
- Irmgard of Oldenburg; married Hero Oomkens von Esens, Lord of Esens, Stedesdorf and Wittmund.
- Hedwig of Oldenburg (d. 22 February 1502); married in 1498 Edo Wimken II of Jever (1468 - 19 April 1511); had issue, including Maria of Jever.
- Adelheid of Oldenburg (d. 1513); married in 1503 Dietrich III of Plesse.

== Ancestry ==
Ancestors of Gerhard VI of Oldenburg

16. John II, Count of Oldenburg
8. Conrad I, Count of Oldenburg
17. Hedwig of Diepholz
4. Christian V, Count of Oldenburg
18. Gerhard IV, Count of Holstein-Plön
9. Ingeborg of Itzehoe
19. Anastasia of Wittenberg
2. Dietrich, Count of Oldenburg
20. Dietrich III, Count of Hohnstein-Klettenberg
10. Dietrich V, Count of Hohnstein-Heringen
21. Elisabeth of Waldeck
5. Agnes of Hohnstein-Heringen
22. Magnus I, Duke of Brunswick-Lüneburg (=28)
11. Sophie of Brunswick
23. Sophia of Brandenburg-Stendal (=29)
1. Gerhard VI, Count of Oldenburg
24. Gerhard III, Count of Holstein-Rendsburg
12. Henry II, Count of Holstein-Rendsburg
25. Sophie of Mecklenburg-Werle
6. Gerhard VI, Count of Holstein-Rendsburg
26. Albert II, Duke of Mecklenburg
13. Ingeborg of Mecklenburg-Schwerin
27. Euphemia of Sweden
3. Hedvig of Holstein
28. Magnus I, Duke of Brunswick-Lüneburg (=22)
14. Magnus II, Duke of Brunswick-Lüneburg
29. Sophia of Brandenburg-Stendal (=23)
7. Catherine Elisabeth of Brunswick-Lüneburg
30. Bernhard III, Prince of Anhalt-Bernburg
15. Catherine of Anhalt-Bernburg
31. Agnes of Saxe-Wittebberg

== Other sources ==
- Hartmut Platte (2006) as Haus Oldenburg (Börde-Verlag, Werl) ISBN 3-9810315-4-7

Gerhard VI of Oldenburg House of Oldenburg Born: 1430 Died: 22 February 1500
Regnal titles
Preceded by Christian VII	Count of Oldenburg; 1450–1483	Succeeded by Adolph
