= Dano-Hanseatic War (1426–1435) =

15th-century northern European conflict

Dano–Hanseatic War (1426–1435)
- Part of the Danish–Hanseatic rivalry
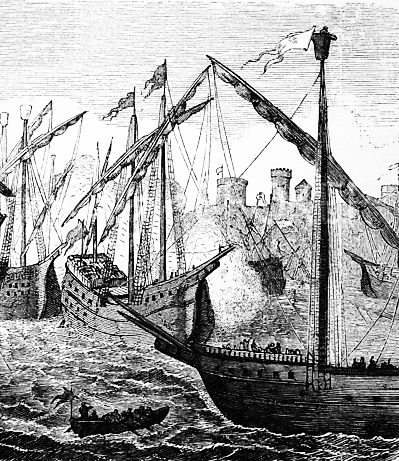
- Hanseatic ships in front of Copenhagen, Denmark, 1428
| Date | 1426–1435 |
| Location | Scandinavia; Northern Germany; Baltic Sea |
| Result | Hanseatic victory |
| Territorial changes | The Danish Duchy of Schleswig is ceded to the count of Holstein (although still as a Danish vassal); Danish forces temporarily expulsed from Sweden |

Belligerents
| Hanseatic League; Hamburg; Lübeck; Lüneburg; Rostock; Stralsund; Wismar; Holstein-Rendsburg; Victual Brothers; Co-belligerent: Sweden (Engelbrekt rebellion) Supported by: Parts of Schleswig | Kalmar Union; Denmark; Norway; Sweden (until 1434); Supported by: Pomerania-Barth; Parts of Schleswig |

Commanders and leaders
| Henry IV †; Gerhard VII # Adolf VIII; Johann Kletze (executed); Tidemann Steen; Johann Beere; Jakob Bramstede; Jan Russenberg; Tideman Soling; Johann Bere; Nikolaus von der Lippe; Johann Bantzkow (executed) | Eric VII; Queen Philippa # Kurd von Hagen; Greger Magnusson; Barnim VIII |

Strength
| 260 ships: 12,000 men; Lübeck: 2,000; Hamburg: 1,000; Rostock: 1,000; Stralsund: 1,000; Wismar: 1,000; Lüneburg: 800 | 114 ships 3,000 men |

The Dano–Hanseatic War, also known as the Kalmar War with the Hanseatic League, or the Danish–Hanseatic War of 1426-1435, was an armed trade conflict between the Danish-dominated Kalmar Union (Denmark, Norway, Sweden) and the Hanseatic League led by the Free City of Lübeck.

When Kalmar King Eric opened the Baltic trade routes for Dutch ships and introduced a new toll for all foreign ships passing the Oresund (Sound Dues), six Hanseatic cities (Hamburg, Lübeck, Lüneburg, Rostock, Stralsund, Wismar) declared war, put a naval blockade on Scandinavian harbors and allied with Eric's enemy, Henry IV, count of Holstein. Therefore the war was intensively linked with the Dutch–Hanseatic War, the Kalmar War with Holstein, and the Swedish revolt of 1434-1436.

== Background ==
Extent of the Hanseatic League circa 1400

Ever since Denmark's defeat in the previous Danish–Hanseatic War, the Hanseatic League held a strong monopoly over Baltic trade. Denmark had to bestow multiple privileges to the Hanseatic League, one of which being a guarantee of free trade throughout the Baltic Sea, and exemption from tolls.

In 1397, due to the rising power of the Hanseatic League, and particularly German city of Lübeck, the three Nordic kingdoms of Denmark, Norway, and Sweden, put aside their differences to unite under a single monarch. This created a personal union between the three nations, birthing the Kalmar Union, named after the city of Kalmar, where the union was ratified.

Under Margaret I, the architect of the Kalmar Union, the Hanseatic League was coerced into returning several forts in Scania that the Hansa had seized per the Treaty of Stralsund. As a result, Margaret effectively removed the Hanseatic League from Denmark's internal politics. Despite this, the Hanseatic League still remained friendly with the Kalmar Union. The League helped Denmark recover Gotland, and did not oppose the formation of the union. As a result, the two parties did not engage in any military conflicts throughout Margaret's reign.

Margaret's successor however, Eric of Pomerania, was not friendly to the League at all. The falling out began when Eric attempted to assert his authority over Duchy of Schleswig. To do this, he supported a rebel movement in Lübeck. However, this did nothing but break the already strained relationship between the Kalmar and Hanseatic factions. Despite the Holy Roman Emperor supporting Eric's claims in Schleswig (and the adjacent region of Holstein), neither Lübeck nor any of the other major Hanseatic cities wished to support his claim.

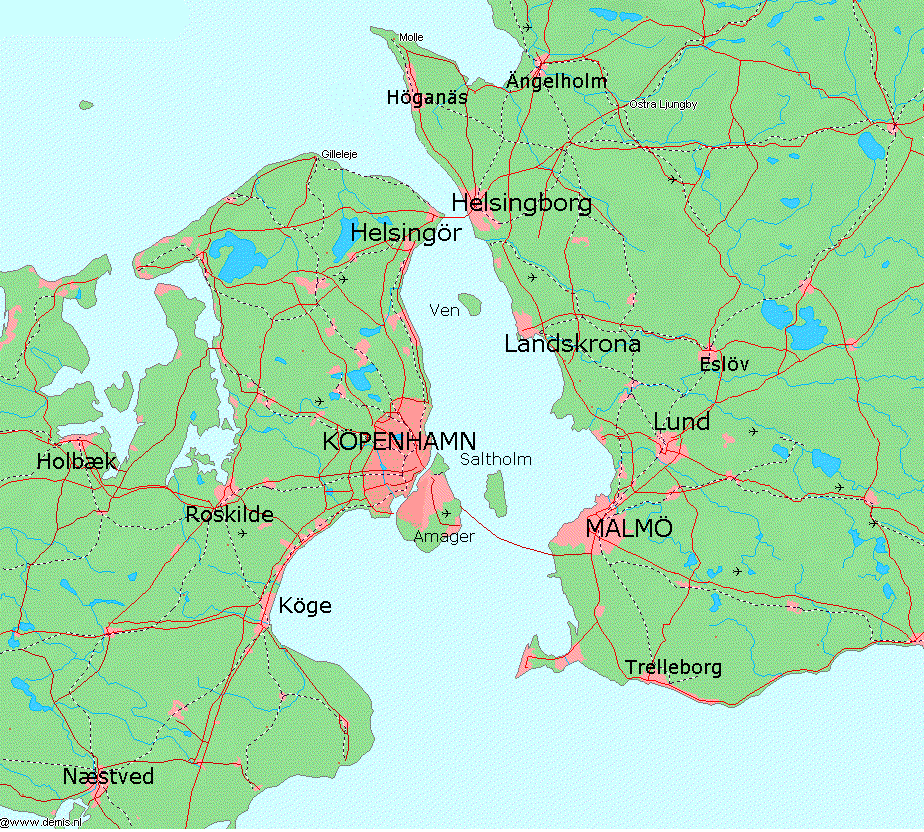
The Oresund

Eric quickly turned on the Hanseatic League following this debacle. He formed alliances with the Kingdom of Poland, accepted Dutch and English merchants into Kalmar ports, and began harassing Hanseatic merchants. Even more alarming to the Hanseatic League was the introduction of the Sound Dues, a tax levied on all ships passing through the Oresund. This was in direct violation of the Treaty of Stralsund, and shortly after, the Wendish cities, led by Lübeck, declared war on the Kalmar Union.

== The War ==
The Hanseatic League quickly imposed a blockade on the Oresund as soon as the war started. However, many Hanseatic towns did not agree with the war. The Prussian, Livonian, and Dutch towns refused to take part in the conflict, as they were angered by the blockade. As such, the Wendish, Pomeranian, and Saxon cities were responsible for the war.

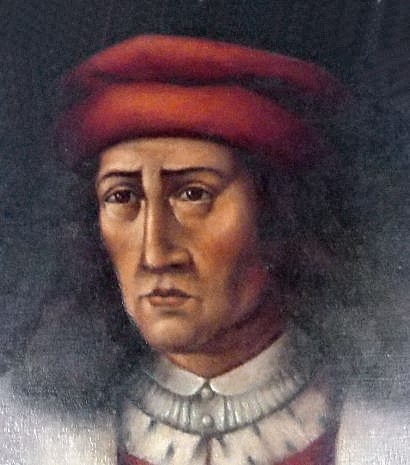
Eric of Pomerania

The war started with a Danish victory in the Oresund, and a Hanseatic salt fleet sailing to Prussia was captured by the Danes as well. As such, popular revolts occurred in some of the Hanseatic cities. Wismar in particular saw a bloody revolt that led to several councilors being beheaded. At the same time, the Dutch were also fighting against the Hansa in their own war. The Dutch would be major allies of the Kalmar Union, providing foodstuffs and running blockades on several occasions. This allowed for the Dutch counties of Holland and Zeeland to grow rich and wealthy, and established the Dutch entry into European trade. After years of changing fortune in warfare Rostock and Stralsund signed a separate peace agreement in 1430. Lübeck, Hamburg, Wismar and Lüneburg, however, continued the war and assisted their allies in Holstein to conquer Flensburg in 1431. Lübeck and Lüneburg in particular benefited from the war, for they could sell salt for high prices to the Baltic states, as the salt passing through the Oresund from the North Sea was inaccessible.

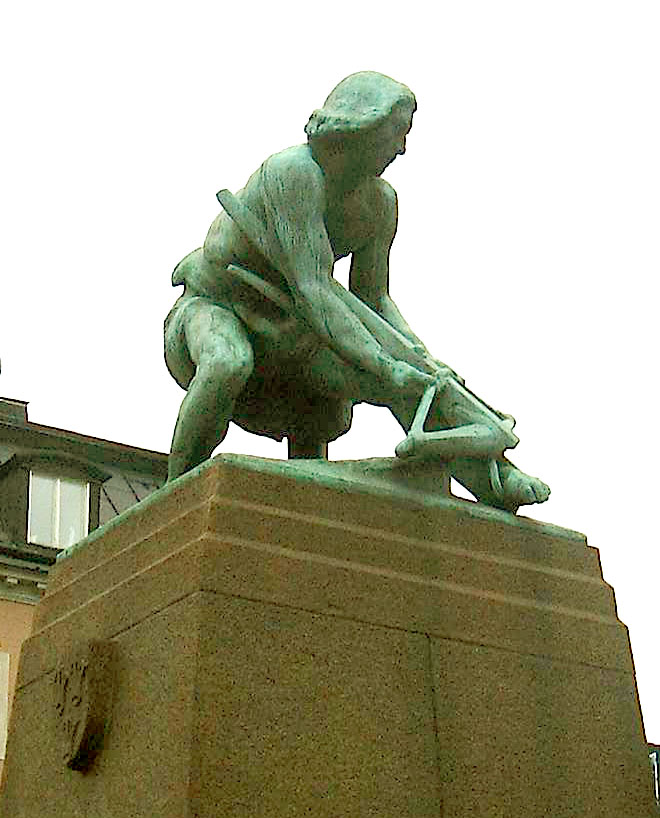
Statue honoring the Engelbrekt Rebellion

Thereafter they agreed an armistice in 1432 and started peace negotiations. Meanwhile the Engelbrekt Rebellion began in Sweden. In 1434 Eric had to agree an armistice with the Swedes, too. All these wars proved too much for Eric to handle, and in April 1435 he signed the peace of Vordingborg with the Hanseatic League and Holstein, followed by the a peace with Sweden a few months later the same year. The Kalmar Union had lost, and the Hanseatic League was victorious against Denmark for the second time.

== Aftermath ==
In the following negotiations, Eric's Oresund tolls were allowed to remain, though the Hanseatic cities were exempted from the Sound Dues. The Danish Duchy of Schleswig was ceded to the count of Holstein. Sweden's autonomous rights and privileges were extended. The Hanseatic League was also granted plenty of other privileges as well, akin to the 1370 treaty. The Hanseatic League would also seize the fort of Helsingborg as well, thus preventing the Dutch from entering the Baltic Sea. These peace agreements weakened Eric's position dramatically, and in 1439 he got dethroned by the Danish and Swedish Privy Councils and by the Norwegian Privy Councils in 1442. The Hanseatic League would replace him with Christopher of Bavaria, who in turn would be succeeded by Christian I, the first Oldenburg king of Denmark.

The Kalmar Union would recover quickly however. Almost immediately into their reigns, Christopher and Christian began favoring native and Dutch traders to counteract the Hanseatic monopoly. When Count Adolf of Holstein died in 1459, locals proclaimed Christian as duke of both Schleswig and Holstein. As a result, Denmark's southernmost border was now dangerously close to Lübeck and the other Wendish towns. Therefore, animosity between the Hanseatic League and the Kalmar Union (specifically Denmark) would continue well into the 17th century.

== Timeline ==
- 1426 – Danish troops reconquer Flensburg (Schleswig) which was occupied by Holstein before
- 1427 – Hanseatic plunder of Bornholm
- 1427 – failed Holstein-Hanseatic attack against Flensburg
- 1427 – Danish and Swedish naval forces defeat a Hanseatic fleet in the Oresund
- 1428 – two Hanseatic attacks against the joint Danish–Swedish fleet in Copenhagen
- 1428 and 1429 – Bergen (Norway) plundered by those Victual Brothers who allied with Holstein and Hansa
- 1429 – failed Danish–Swedish naval operation against Stralsund
- 1429 – Hanseatic capture of a Swedish transport fleet
- 1430 – peace between Denmark, Rostock and Stralsund
- 1431 – Holstein-Hanseatic troops conquer Flensburg
- 1432 – armistice between Denmark and the Hanseatic League
- 1434 – begin of the Swedish revolt, armistice between Denmark and Sweden
- 1435 – peace of Vordingborg, peace of Stockholm
