= Agnes of Baden =

Agnes of Baden may refer to:

- Agnes of Baden, Duchess of Carinthia (1250–1295), German noblewoman, Duchess of Carinthia and Countess of Heunburg
- Agnes of Baden, Countess of Holstein-Rendsburg (1408–1473), German noblewoman, Countess of Holstein-Rendsburg

== See also ==
- Agnes Baden-Powell (1858–1945), sister of Robert Baden-Powell, 1st Baron Baden-Powell
