= Christian of Sweden =

Christian of Sweden - Swedish: Kristian - may refer to:

- Christian I, King of Sweden 1457
- Christian II, King of Sweden 1520
