= Bombardment of Copenhagen (1428) =

- Part of the Dano-Hanseatic War (1426–1435)
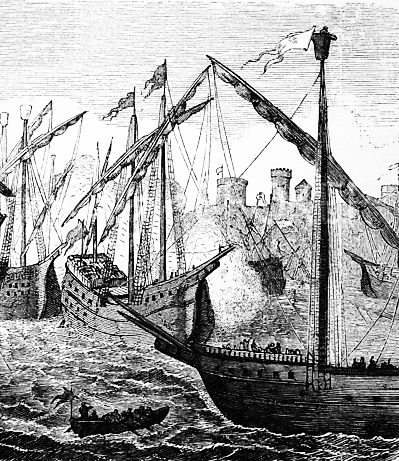
- In 1428 Hanseatic ships attacked Copenhagen twice
| Date | 6 April – 15 June 1428 |
| Location | Copenhagen |
| Result | Hanseatic victory |

Belligerents
| Hanseatic League; Hamburg; Lübeck; Lüneburg; Rostock; Stralsund; Wismar; Holstein-Rendsburg | Kalmar Union; Denmark; Sweden |

Commanders and leaders
| Gerhard VII of Holstein; Johann Beere; Jakob Bramstede; Jan Russenberg; Tideman Soling | King Eric; Queen Philippa |

Strength
| In April 260 ships with 12,000 men in June 80 ships with 6,800 men: Lübeck: 2,000; Hamburg: 1,000; Rostock: 1,000; Stralsund: 1,000; Wismar: 1,000; Lüneburg: 800 | Unknown number of ships manned with 3,000 soldiers and sailors |

Casualties and losses
| Unknown | 30 killed, only three ships escaped undamaged |

During the Dano-Hanseatic War (1426–1435) the Danish capital Copenhagen was bombarded twice by ships from six Northern German Hanseatic towns. A first attack in April 1428 was repelled, but a second attack on 15 June was successful. The Danish fleet which anchored in Copenhagen was mostly destroyed, with only three ships surviving. For the first time in the Northern European history of naval warfare ship artillery was used over longer distances.

== Two naval battles ==
These two battles of April and June 1428 are sometimes confused with the naval battle in the Øresund (also called battle of Copenhagen) of July 1427. So sometimes, when two Hanseatic attacks of Copenhagen are mentioned, the battle of July 1427 and the battle of April 1428 are meant.

=== First attack in April 1428 ===
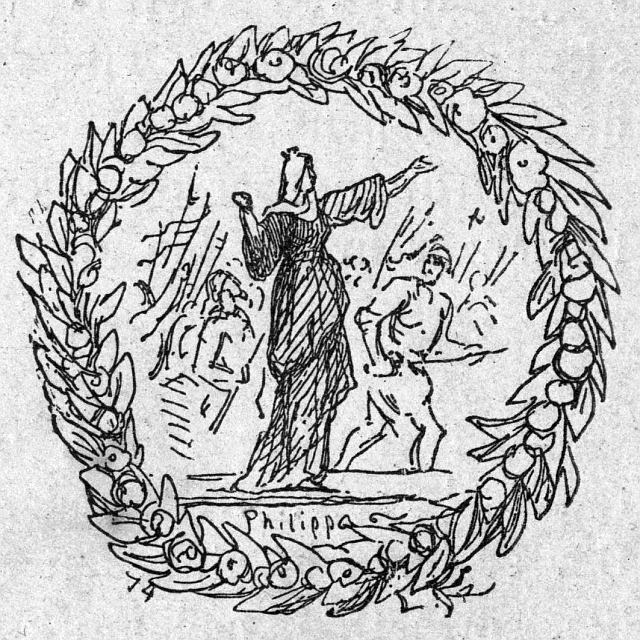
For the heroic defence of Copenhagen the Danish national author Hans Christian Andersen glorified and hailed Queen Philippa in his Gudfaders Billedbog (Godfather's picture book). The illustrations were made by Lorenz Frølich in 1868.

Hoping for a rapid and victorious end of the Danish-Holstein-Hanseatic War, the Hanseatic league planned the seizure of the Danish capital and the destruction of the joint Danish-Swedish fleet in the harbour. On Easter 1428, under the command of Gerhard VII, Count of Holstein, up to 260 ships with more than 12,000 mercenaries sailed from Wismar to Copenhagen. However, the Danes were well-prepared and their capital was well-fortified.

While King Eric left Copenhagen and prayed for the victory in Sorø Abbey, Queen Philippa managed the defence of the capital. Under massive shelling from Danish land-based artillery, armed bridges, and floating batteries the Hanseatic ships failed to blockade the harbour and to surround the Danish-Swedish fleet. When the Danish and Swedish ships started a counter-attack, the Hanseats and Holsteiners were forced to retreat.

=== Second attack in June 1428 ===
On June 15 of 1428 the Hanseats came back, now under Lübeck command. Up to 40 ships especially loaded with stones and lime were sunk in the harbour's entrance, trapping the Royal Danish-Swedish fleet inside. This time the Hanseats used floating batteries, too. With the help of these floating batteries the Hanseats were able to extend the range of their artillery and to cover the Danish and Swedish ships with a massive bombardment. By the end of the day, 30 Danish soldiers and sailors were killed and most of the King's ships were sunk, destroyed, or damaged. Only three ships remained undamaged and were able to escape.

== Consequences ==
Although the fleet which anchored in Copenhagen was "neutralized", the war continued. King Eric was able to set up a new fleet soon. Already in the end of July 1428 at least seven ships were repaired and won a naval battle against the Victual Brothers who were allied with the Hanseatic League and Holstein. Queen Philippa meanwhile organized a new fleet with Swedish help. In May 1429 Philippa's fleet started a punitive attack against the Hanseatic city of Stralsund.

== Sources ==
- George Childs Kohn (ed.): Dictionary of Wars, 254f. Routledge 2013
- Günter Krause: Das Seegefecht vor Kopenhagen - Die Vernichtung der dänischen Flotte durch die Hanse, In: Sport und Technik, edition 1/1987, page 14f. Militärverlag der DDR, Berlin 1987
- Georg Wislicenus, Willy Stöwer: Deutschlands Seemacht nebst einem Überblick über die Geschichte der Seefahrt aller Völker, page 38f. Reprint-Verlag, Leipzig 1896
- Andr Fryxell: Erzählungen aus der Schwedischen Geschichte, page 354f. Fritze, Stockholm und Leipzig 1843
