= Hedvig of Holstein =

German noblewoman (died c. 1436)

- Countess of Oldenburg
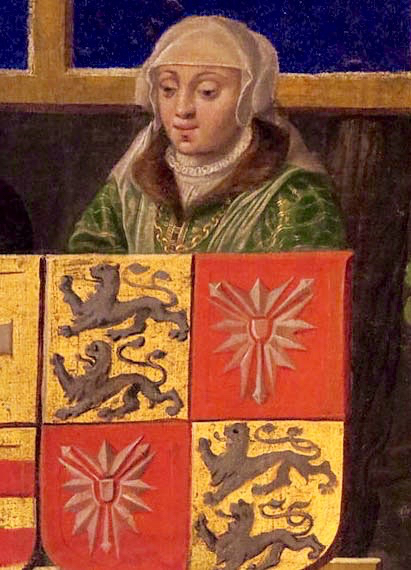
- Died: c. 1436
- Buried: St. Lambert's Church
- Noble family: Schauenburg
- Spouses: Balthasar of Mecklenburg; Dietrich of Oldenburg
- Issue: Christian I of Denmark; Maurice V of Delmenhorst; Gerhard VI, Count of Oldenburg; Adelheid, Countess of Hohenstein and Mansfeld
- Father: Gerhard VI of Holstein-Rendsburg
- Mother: Elisabeth of Brunswick-Lüneburg

Hedvig of Holstein (German: Heilwig; Danish: Hedevig; died c. 1436) was a German noblewoman of the House of Schauenburg and, by marriage to Dietrich of Oldenburg, Countess of Oldenburg. She was the daughter of Gerhard VI of Holstein-Rendsburg, Duke of Schleswig and Count of Holstein, and Elisabeth of Brunswick-Lüneburg.

She was the mother of Christian I of Denmark, the first king of Denmark from the House of Oldenburg.

== Biography ==
She was a daughter of Gerhard VI of Holstein-Rendsburg and his wife, Catherine Elisabeth of Brunswick-Lüneburg. Her brother was Adolf VIII/I, Count of Holstein/Duke of Schleswig. Through their father, they were cognatic descendants of King Eric V of Denmark (1249–1286) while through their mother, they were cognatic descendants of King Abel of Denmark (1218–1252). Through their father, they were also descendants of King Magnus III of Sweden.

On 18 April 1417, Hedvig married Balthasar of Werle, who died in 1421. In 1423, she married Dietrich, Count of Oldenburg. They had four children:

- Christian I (1426–1481), who succeeded his father as Count of Oldenburg and Delmenhorst. He was elected King of Denmark in 1448. Following the death of his childless maternal uncle, Adolf VIII, Christian was elected Duke of Schleswig and Count of Holstein in 1460.
- Maurice V of Delmenhorst (1428–1464), who received the County of Delmenhorst after his elder brother became king.
- Gerhard VI (1430–1500), who received the County of Oldenburg after his elder brother became king and inherited Delmenhorst from the heirs of his brother Maurice around 1483.
- Adelheid of Oldenburg (1425–1475), who married firstly Ernest III, Count of Hohnstein (died 1454), and secondly, in 1474, Gerhard VI, Count of Mansfeld (died 1492).

== Ancestry ==
Ancestors of Hedvig of Holstein

8. Gerhard III, Count of Holstein-Rendsburg
4. Henry II, Count of Holstein-Rendsburg
9. Sophie of Mecklenburg-Werle
2. Gerhard VI, Count of Holstein-Rendsburg
10. Albert II, Duke of Mecklenburg
5. Ingeborg of Mecklenburg
11. Euphemia of Sweden
1. Hedvig of Holstein
12. Magnus I, Duke of Brunswick-Lüneburg
6. Magnus II, Duke of Brunswick-Lüneburg
13. Sophie of Brandenburg
3. Catherine Elisabeth of Brunswick-Lüneburg
14. Bernhard III, Prince of Anhalt-Bernburg
7. Catherine of Anhalt-Bernburg
15. Agnes of Saxe-Wittemberg

=== Danish royal descent ===
Valdemar II
Christopher I	Abel
Eric V	Sophie
Richenza	Bernhard II
Sophie	Bernhard III
Henry II	Catherine
Gerhard VI	Catherine Elisabeth
Hedvig of Holstein

=== Swedish royal descent ===
Magnus III
Erik Magnusson
Euphemia
Ingeborg
Gerhard VI
Hedvig of Holstein

== Other Sources ==
- "Christian I 2019". Britannica Library. Encyclopaedia Britannica.
- Hartmut Platte (2006) Das Haus Oldenburg (Börde-Verlag, Werl) ISBN 3-9810315-4-7

== See also ==
- Counts of Schauenburg and Holstein
