= Dietrich, Count of Oldenburg =

German noble and Count of Oldenburg (died 1440)

Dietrich of Oldenburg
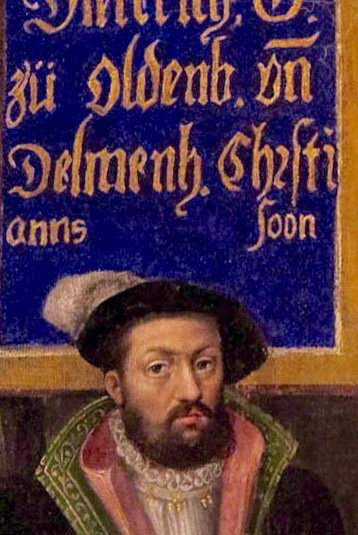

Count of Oldenburg
- Reign: 1423–1440
- Predecessor: Christian VI
- Successor: Christian VII
- Died: 14 February 1440; Delmenhorst, Holy Roman Empire
- Buried: St. Lambert's Church
- Noble family: Oldenburg
- Spouses: Countess Adelheid of Oldenburg-Delmenhorst; Hedvig of Holstein
- Issue: Christian I of Denmark; Maurice V of Delmenhorst; Gerhard VI, Count of Oldenburg; Adelheid, Countess of Hohenstein and Mansfeld
- Father: Christian V, Count of Oldenburg
- Mother: Agnes of Honstein

Dietrich or Theoderic of Oldenburg (Note: Medieval Latin: Teudericus de Oldenburg; Medieval Scandinavian: Didrik af Oldenborg; German: Dietrich von Oldenburg; Medieval French: Thierry d'Oldenbourg.) (died 14 February 1440), also known as Dietrich the Lucky (Dietrich der Glückliche), was Count of Oldenburg and Delmenhorst. He was known as "Fortunatus" for securing Delmenhorst for his branch of the House of Oldenburg.

Dietrich was the father of Christian I of Denmark, the first Danish king of the House of Oldenburg.

== Lineage ==
Dietrich of Oldenburg was the son of Christian V of Oldenburg, who became the Count circa 1398 and died in 1403. His mother was the Countess Agnes of Honstein. His grandfather, Conrad I of Oldenburg, who died circa 1368, left his lands divided between Dietrich's father and uncle, Conrad II.

Dietrich's father, Christian V, managed to gain the upper hand when Conrad II's son Maurice II died in 1420. After this, most of the Oldenburg family patrimony was under the rule of Dietrich's branch. However, the house had several minor branches with estates and claims, as was usual in any medieval fief.

Dietrich was the grandson of Ingeborg of Itzehoe, a Holstein princess who had married Count Conrad I of Oldenburg. After the death of her only brother, Count Gerhard V of Holstein-Itzehoe-Plön in 1350, Ingeborg and her issue were the heirs of her grandmother Ingeborg of Sweden (d. ca. 1290, the first wife of Gerhard II of Holstein-Plön), the eldest daughter of King Valdemar of Sweden and Queen Sophia, who herself was the eldest daughter of King Eric IV of Denmark and Jutta of Saxony who had no male descendants. Since there were no other living legitimate descendants of King Valdemar by this time, Dietrich was considered the heir general of Kings Valdemar I of Sweden and Eric IV of Denmark.

Dietrich succeeded his father as head of the House of Oldenburg in 1403, and is the patrilineal 14x great-grandfather of King Charles III of the United Kingdom.

== Marriages and children ==
During his childhood, Dietrich married a distant cousin, Countess Adelheid of Oldenburg-Delmenhorst, daughter of Count Otto IV of Delmenhorst, for reasons of succession and to unite the hereditary fiefs. Countess Adelheid is presumed to have died in 1404. In 1423, Dietrich married again to Hedvig of Holstein (born between 1398–1400 and died in 1436), widow of Prince Balthasar of Mecklenburg and daughter of Duke Gerhard VI of Schleswig and Holstein, and Elisabeth of Brunswick. Hedvig was the sister of the reigning Duke Adolf VIII. All Dietrich's legitimate children were born by his second wife.

His second marriage strengthened the Oldenburg ties to the Scandinavian monarchies, as Hedvig was a descendant of King Eric V of Denmark, King Haakon V of Norway and King Magnus Ladulås of Sweden. During Dietrich's lifetime, the three kingdoms were united under the Kalmar Union, and these dynastic connections would later prove important for his eldest son, Christian.

Dietrich had four children:

- Christian (1426–1481), who succeeded his father as Count of Oldenburg and Delmenhorst. He later became king of Denmark, Norway and Sweden, and Duke of Schleswig and Holstein, establishing the House of Oldenburg on the Danish throne.
- Maurice V of Delmenhorst (1428–1464), who received the County of Delmenhorst after Christian became king.
- Gerhard VI (1430–1500), who received the County of Oldenburg two years after Christian became king. Around 1483, he also inherited Delmenhorst from the heirs of his brother Maurice.
- Adelheid (1425–1475), who married firstly Ernest III, Count of Hohnstein (died 1454), and secondly, in 1474, Gerhard VI, Count of Mansfeld (died 1492).

== Male line of descendants ==
Dietrich of Oldenburg is a direct ancestor of the Danish royal family having fathered the first House of Oldenburg King of Denmark, Christian I. He is also a direct male ancestor of the British royal family, the pretenders to the Kingdom of the Hellenes, the Norwegian royal family, and the last Russian czars of Romanov-Holstein-Gottorp.

== Notes ==
Dietrich, Count of Oldenburg House of Oldenburg Born: 1390 Died: 14 February 1440
Regnal titles
Preceded by Maurice II	Count of Oldenburg; 1403–1440 with his cousin Maurice II (1401–1420) his brother Christian VI (1403–1421)	Succeeded by Christian VII
