= Agnes of Baden, Countess of Holstein-Rendsburg =

Agnes of Baden (25 March 1408 – January 1473), was a German noblewoman member of the House of Zähringen and by marriage Countess of Holstein-Rendsburg. She married Gerhard VII, Count of Holstein-Rendsburg, and gave birth to twins whose legality was disputed and who were likely murdered.

She was a daughter of Bernard I, Margrave of Baden by his second wife Anna of Oettingen.

== Life ==
In Ettlingen on 23 February 1432 she was betrothed to Gerhard VII, Count of Holstein-Rendsburg. Her older brother Jacob, new Margrave of Baden was very anxious for this marriage because he wanted to obtain political advantages in Schleswig. The marriage was celebrated in Baden on 2 June of that year, but Gerhard VII quickly returned to his domains in order to secure his frontiers without an official wedding night. Officially, the marriage was consummated only on 5 October.

On 15 January 1433 Agnes, pregnant at that time, fell from the stairs at Gottorf Castle. The next day she gave birth healthy twins, Henry and Catherine. This caused surprise and the scandal erupted, because it was clear that the consummation of the marriage and the date of birth were too close to produce living children.

To stop the increased rumours about his paternity, in February Gerhard VII declared in the courtyard of Gottorf Castle in front of his knights that he secretly slept with Agnes before the wedding, and that she'd been a virgin then; therefore, the children were his, and Henry would be capable of inheriting his possessions. In Schleswig Cathedral and in a State Assembly before the clergy and nobility Gerhard VII reaffirmed his word, who was further confirmed by court ladies, doctors and midwives. The matter was ultimately settled by the Bishops of Lübeck and Schleswig. The Count's brother Adolphus VIII supported his declaration. All the scandal received the name of the "Twin Disaster of Gottorf" (de: Zwillingssturz von Gottorf).

Gerhard VII suffered from a lung disease. Shortly after the declaration in Schleswig Cathedral, his condition worsened, and doctors are unable to help him. Against medical advice, Agnes and her husband travelled to a spa in her native Baden; however, in the middle of the trip, Gerhard VII became worse and in Cologne they decided to return. Gerhard VII died on 24 July 1433 during the return journey in Emmerich am Rhein. He was buried there.

During her return in Hamburg, Agnes received unexpected news: her brother-in-law Adolphus VIII refused her entry to Holstein, kidnapped her children and denied her rights as a widow, because her dowry was never paid and the recent scandal about the paternity of the twins. Without options, Agnes was forced to return to Baden. She never saw her children again: Henry was drowned in the Schlei River shortly after and Catherine entered in Preetz Priory as a nun. Both children were probably murdered.

Her brother Margrave Jacob of Baden at first strongly supported her rights; however, on 2 June 1436 she was secretly betrothed and married with Hans von Höwen, a former admirer. Margrave Jacob, who at that time was negotiated a new marriage for his sister with one of the sons of Piast Duke Konrad V of Oleśnica, was furious. By order of her brother, in 1437 Agnes was imprisoned for life in Eberstein Castle in Ebersteinburg, where she died blind in the first weeks of 1473.
