= Adolph VIII of Holstein =

Adolphus XI

Count of Holstein-Rendsburg
- Reign: 1427–1459
- Predecessor: Henry IV
- Successor: Gerhard VII

Duke of Schleswig
- Reign: 1440–1459
- Predecessor: Henry IV
- Successor: Christian I
- Spouse: Margaret of Höllenstein (m. 1435)
- House: House of Schauenburg
- Father: Gerhard VI, Count of Holstein-Rendsburg
- Mother: Catherine Elisabeth of Brunswick-Lüneburg

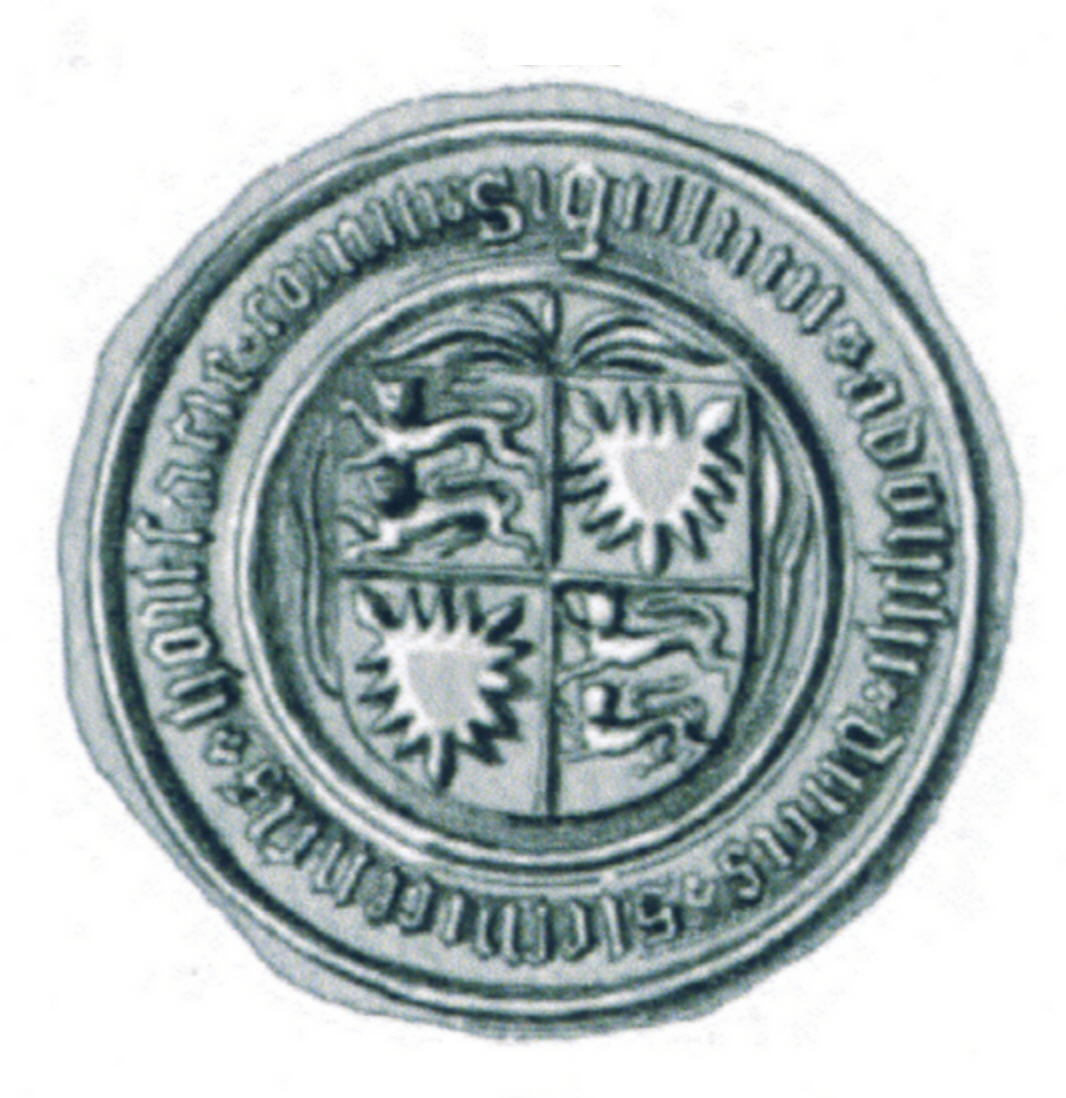
Seal of Adolf VIII dating from around 1447

Adolphus XI of Schauenburg (Low German: Alef or Alv, German: Adolf von Schauenburg, Danish: Adolf 8. af Holsten-Rendsborg) (1401 – 4 December 1459), as Adolph I Duke of Schleswig (Danish: Sønderjylland, formerly Slesvig), and as Adolph VIII Count of Holstein-Rendsburg, was the mightiest vassal of the Danish realm.

== Background ==
Adolph descended from a branch of the House of Schauenburg, who had for centuries been counts of Holstein, and as such, vassals of the Holy Roman Empire. His great-grandfather Gerhard the Great, having also been a Regent of the Kingdom of Denmark, had received the Duchy of Sønderjylland from the Danish crown as a hereditary fief. It had been lost for the Schauenburgs between 1330 and 1375, with Queen Margaret I of Denmark restricting the regained ducal power in 1386, and again from 1414 to 1440.

Count Adolph's parents were Gerhard VI, Count of Holstein-Rendsburg and Catherine Elisabeth of Brunswick-Lüneburg. Adolph was only three years old when his father was killed in action against the Ditmarsians in the Battle at Hamme near Heide (today's Schleswig-Holstein), on 4 August 1404. Adolph was educated at the court of Frederick I, Margrave of Brandenburg.

== Career ==
Adolph's elder brother Henry IV succeeded their father. As Duke of Schleswig, he was under the tutelage of the Danish crown due to his minority until 1414. However, then the crown denied Henry's claim to dukedom. Henry and his mother and brothers stood together and fought for his claim. During the Danish-Holstein-Hanseatic war Henry was killed in action beleaguering Flensburg on 28 May 1427.

Adolph and his younger brother Gerhard VII then succeeded Henry as Counts of Holstein-Rendsburg, continuing their efforts to receive the Duchy of Schleswig. However, Gerhard died in 1433 in Emmerich upon Rhine. In July 1435 Adolph and the Danish King Eric of Pomerania concluded the second Treaty of Vordingborg at Vordingborg Castle, confirming Adolph's de facto holdings in Schleswig duchy. In 1439, the new Danish King Christopher III acquired the loyalty of Adolph by granting him the entire Duchy of Schleswig as a hereditary Danish fief. Adolph's lands were located in both sides of the border between Denmark and the Holy Roman Empire.

The current branch of Danish royal house became extinct in 1448 with the death of Christopher III of Denmark. Adolph was a cognatic descendant of King Eric V of Denmark, whose mother Queen Dowager Margaret Sambiria had obtained a papal confirmation of the right of also female descendancy of Christopher I of Denmark to succeed to the throne of Denmark. Adolph was also the cognatic descendant of King Abel of Denmark through his daughter Sophia; Christopher III was the last descendant of King Abel's sons. The throne was offered by the Rigsråd to Adolph, who as Duke of Schleswig, was the vassal with the biggest holdings in the Danish realm. Adolph, by that time old and childless, declined and supported the candidacy of his own nephew the Count of Oldenburg who became Christian I of Denmark.

Adolph was married on 5 March 1435, to Margaret of Höllenstein of the German noble family of Hohnstein. They had one son, who died young. In 1459 Adolph died and left no descendants to inherit. His sisters were the late Hedvig (German: Heilwig), who was married with Dietrich, Count of Oldenburg and had left children, and the elderly Ingeborg of Holstein, Abbess of Vadstena, who lived as a nun and was both unmarried and childless. His brother Gerhard had mixed twins, with the son Henry drowned still young and the daughter Catherine a nun in Preetz Priory. There were several claimants to Holstein-Rendsburg and Schleswig, since then the Schauenburgs still continued to rule the County of Holstein-Pinneberg in the male line, and several extinct lines of the family, counts of different parts of Holstein, had left female offspring and their cognatic heirs. Adolph's branch was not genealogically very senior.

The representatives of Schleswig and Holstein (nobility and some delegates of the Estates) convened in Ribe where, on 5 March 1460, the succession was confirmed to Christian I of Denmark, the eldest nephew of the late Duke of Schleswig and Count of Holstein-Rendsburg.

== Seal ==

His seal shows the coats-of-arms of Schleswig (two lions) and Holstein (the so-called stylised nettle leaf). The inscription says: SIGILLUM*ADOLPHI*DUCIS*SLEVICENSIS*HOLTSACIE*COMITIS (Seal • of Adolphus • Duke • of Schleswig • Holstein's • Count)

== Ancestry ==
Ancestors of Adolph VIII of Holstein

8. Gerhard III, Count of Holstein-Rendsburg
4. Henry II, Count of Holstein-Rendsburg
9. Sophie of Mecklenburg-Werle
2. Gerhard VI, Count of Holstein-Rendsburg
10. Albert II, Duke of Mecklenburg
5. Ingeborg of Mecklenburg
11. Euphemia of Sweden
1. Adolf of Schauenburg and Holstein-Rendsburg
12. Magnus I, Duke of Brunswick-Lüneburg
6. Magnus II, Duke of Brunswick-Lüneburg
13. Sophie of Brandenburg
3. Catherine Elisabeth of Brunswick-Lüneburg
14. Bernhard III, Prince of Anhalt-Bernburg
7. Catherine of Anhalt-Bernburg
15. Agnes of Saxe-Wittemberg

== See also ==
- Treaty of Ribe
- History of Schleswig-Holstein

== Sources ==
This article derives mainly from the Salmon Konversationsleksikon 2nd edition (JH Schultz Forlag. 1915 to 1930).

- Die Fürsten des Landes: Herzöge und Grafen von Schleswig, Holstein und Lauenburg [De slevigske hertuger; German], Carsten Porskrog Rasmussen (ed.) on behalf of the Gesellschaft für Schleswig-Holsteinische Geschichte, Neumünster: Wachholtz, 2008, ISBN 978-3-529-02606-5.
- Karl Jansen (1875). "Adolf VIII." . Allgemeine Deutsche Biographie (in German). Vol. 1. Leipzig: Duncker & Humblot. pp. 110–111.
- Heinz Maybaum (1953). "Adolf VIII.". Neue Deutsche Biographie (in German). Vol. 1. Berlin: Duncker & Humblot. p. 79. (full text online).

== Other sources ==
- Gregersen, H. V. (1981) Slesvig og Holsten før 1830 (Politiken) ISBN 978-87-567-3479-0 Danish
- Trap J. P. (1975) Hertugdømmet Slesvig (Selskabet for Udgivelse af Kilder til Dansk Historie) ISBN 978-87-7500-701-1 Danish
- Pulsiano, Phillip; Wolf, Kirsten (1993) Medieval Scandinavia: An Encyclopedia (Taylor & Francis) ISBN 0-8240-4787-7

Adolph XI of Schauenburg House of Schaumburg Born: 1401 Died: 4 December 1459
Regnal titles
Preceded by Henry IV	Count of Holstein-Rendsburg; 1427–1459 with Gerhard VII (1427-1433)	Succeeded by Christian I
Vacant Disputed by Denmark Title last held by Henry III	Duke of Schleswig; 1440–1459	Succeeded by Christian I
