= Dietrich of Horne =

German nobleman

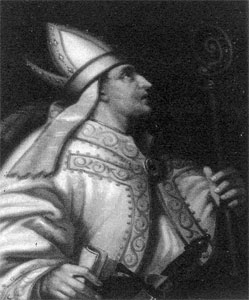
- Dietrich of Horne
- Born: Horneburg Castle, near Westendorf (now part of Rieste)
- Died: 19 January 1402; Osnabrück
- Noble family: von Horne

Dietrich of Horne (? in Horneburg (Westendorf) – 19 January 1402, in Osnabrück) was a German nobleman. He was bishop of Osnabrück from 1376 until his death.

== Life ==
Dietrich was a member of the noble von Horne family, who resided at Horneburg Castle (later name Harenburg Castle) northeast of the settlement of Westendorf, today called Bieste, north of Osnabrück. The settlement of Bieste is now part of the municipality of Rieste. He allegedly had an illegitimate son name Frederick of Horne.

In 1376, the cathedral chapter of the Bishopric of Osnabrück elected Dietrich in episcopum et pastorem ecclesie Osnaburgensis, i.e. as the new bishop. At the time of this election, the bishopric was involved in several disputes and was heavily indebted. All of its castles — except the castle in Quakenbrück — were occupied by Count Otto VI of Tecklenburg. A conflict arose when Otto VI remanded that Dietrich should concentrate on the religious affairs of his diocese, leaving worldly power in his bishopric to the counts of Tecklenburg. Dietrich managed to reconquer several towns, including Vörden, during the course of this conflict.

During his tenure there was also a dispute with the Order of Saint John, Commandry of Lage, who refused to pay taxes to the bishopric. In 1384, Dietrich ordered a raid on the commandry, probably on 18 February. During the raid, the commandry was destroyed. After a long struggle, he reimbursed the commandry, so that it could be rebuilt.

In 1398, the cathedral chapter of Osnabrück decided that during the rest of his tenure only nobleman and graduates could join the chapter. In 1400, the border with the Diocese of Münster was modified: the district of Cloppenburg was transferred to Münster; the County of Lingen and the Lower Stift of Münster were transferred to Osnabrück (for religious affairs only; Münster retained worldly power in the Lower Stift).

Towards the end of his reign, he was weakened by old age and illness. Leading circles in the bishopric opposed him and he had to appoint a coadjutor to resist them.

== Footnotes ==
Dietrich of Horne von Horne Died: 19 January 1402
Catholic Church titles
Regnal titles
| Preceded by Melchior | Prince-Bishop of Osnabrück; 1376–1402 | Succeeded by Henry I |
