= Gerhard VII of Holstein-Rendsburg =

Gerhard VII, Count of Holstein-Rendsburg
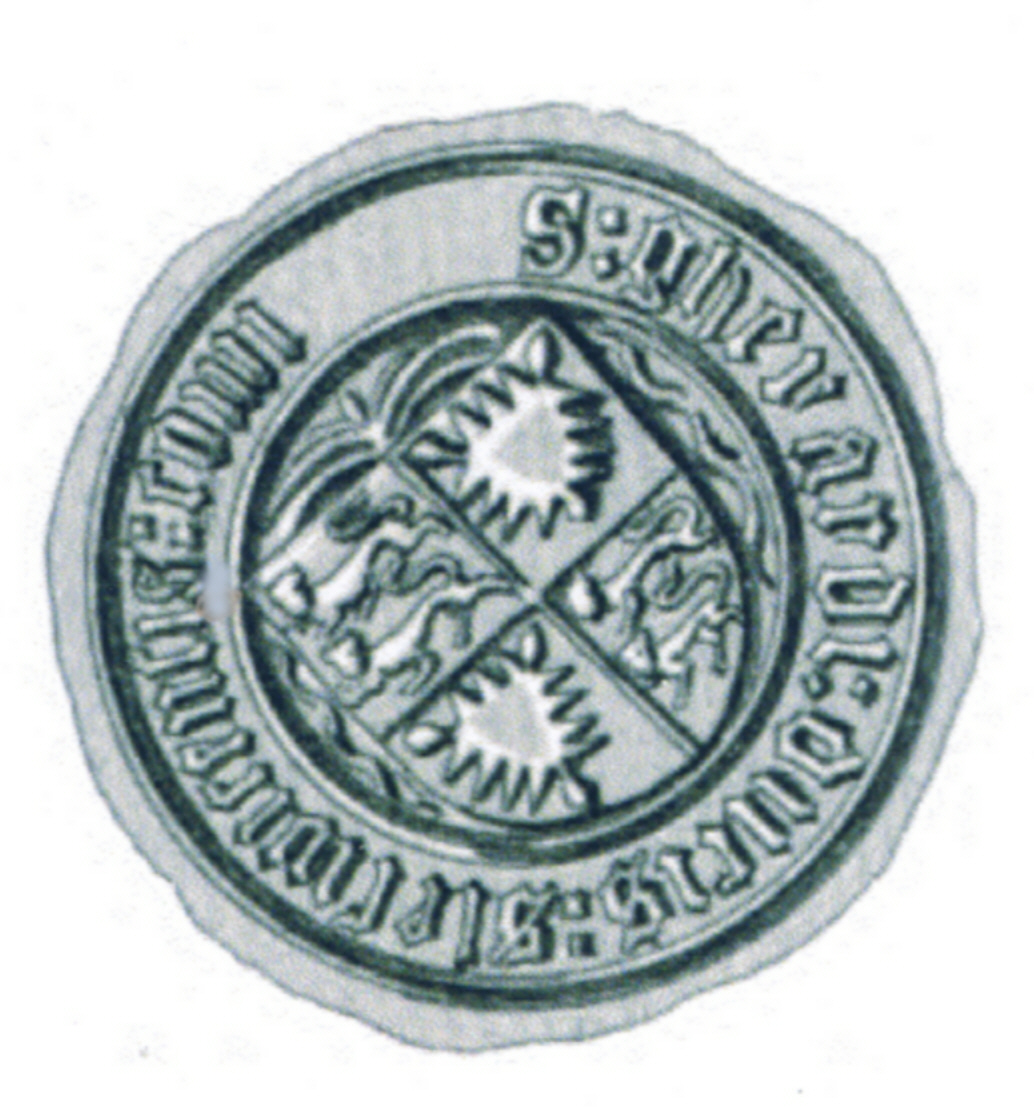
- Seal of Gerhard VII, from c. 1422
- Born: 1404
- Died: 24 July 1433; Emmerich am Rhein
- Buried: Emmerich am Rhein
- Noble family: Schauenburg
- Spouse: Agnes of Baden
- Father: Gerhard VI, Count of Holstein-Rendsburg
- Mother: Catherine Elisabeth of Brunswick-Lüneburg

Gerhard VII, Count of Holstein-Rendsburg (1404 – 24 July 1433 in Emmerich am Rhein) was Count of Holstein-Rendsburg and by claim also Duke of Schleswig, as Gerhard III. He was the youngest son of Gerhard VI and his wife Elizabeth of Brunswick.

== Life ==
During the Danish-Hanseatic War, together with his elder brothers Henry IV and Adolf VIII, he fought on the side of the Hanseatic League against Denmark. In 1428, he took part as commander of the city fleet in the attack of Flensburg and the bombardment of Copenhagen by the Hanseatic League.

In 1427, Gerhard VII and his brother Adolf VIII jointly took over the Duchy of Schleswig from their other fallen brother Henry IV (as Henry III duke of Schleswig).

On 2 June 1432, Gerhard VII married Agnes, the daughter of Margrave Bernard I of Baden. On 15 January 1433, she fell from the stairs and went into labour. She gave birth to healthy twins: Henry and Catherine. It was fairly clear that she must have been pregnant on the day of her wedding, giving rise to rumours that the children might not have been Gerhard's. To stop these rumours, Gerhard VII declared in Schleswig Cathedral that he was the father, and that he'd secretly slept with his future wife before the wedding, and that she'd been a virgin then. Therefore, the children were his, and Henry would be capable of inheriting his possessions. Adolf VIII supported this declaration.

Gerhard VII suffered from a lung disease. In February 1433, his condition got worse, and his doctors could not help him. Gerhard and Agnes then decided to travel to the spa in Baden-Baden. While they were travelling, his condition got even worse and in Cologne, they decided to turn back. Gerhard VII died on 24 July 1433, during the return journey and was buried in Emmerich am Rhein.

Adolf VIII refused to hand over Agnes's Wittum to her, and refused her access to his territory. She had no choice, and returned to Baden. The twins, Henry and Catherine, died young under suspicious circumstances.

== Ancestry ==
Ancestors of Gerhard VII of Holstein-Rendsburg

16. Henry I, Count of Holstein-Rendsburg
8. Gerhard III, Count of Holstein-Rendsburg
17. Heilwig of Bronckhorst
4. Henry II, Count of Holstein-Rendsburg
18. Nicholas II, Lord of Werle
9. Sophie of Mecklenburg-Werle
19. Richenza of Denmark
2. Gerhard VI, Count of Holstein-Rendsburg
20. Henry II, Lord of Mecklenburg
10. Albert II, Duke of Mecklenburg
21. Anna of Saxe-Wittenberg
5. Ingeborg of Mecklenburg
22. Erik Magnusson, Duke
11. Euphemia of Sweden
23. Ingeborg of Norway
1. Gerhard VII, Count of Holstein-Rendsburg
24. Albert II, Duke of Brunswick-Lüneburg
12. Magnus I, Duke of Brunswick-Lüneburg
25. Rixa of Werle
6. Magnus II, Duke of Brunswick-Lüneburg
26. Henry I, Margrave of Brandenburg-Stendal
13. Sophie of Brandenburg
27. Agnes of Bavaria
3. Catherine Elisabeth of Brunswick-Lüneburg
28. Bernhard II, Prince of Anhalt-Bernburg
14. Bernhard III, Prince of Anhalt-Bernburg
29. Helena of Rügen
7. Catherine of Anhalt-Bernburg
30. Rudolph I, Duke of Saxe-Wittenberg
15. Agnes of Saxe-Wittemberg
31. Judith of Brandenburg

Gerhard of Schauenburg House of Schauenburg Born: 1404 Died: 24 July 1433 in Emmerich
Preceded by Henry III & IV	— TITULAR — Duke of Schleswig; Reason for succession failure: Disputed by Denmark	Succeeded by Adolph (VIII)
Preceded by Henry III & IV	Count of Holstein-Rendsburg; 1427-1433 with Adolph VIII (1427-1459)	Succeeded by Adolph (VIII)
