= Henry III of Schauenburg-Holstein =

Henry III, Count of Schauenburg-Holstein
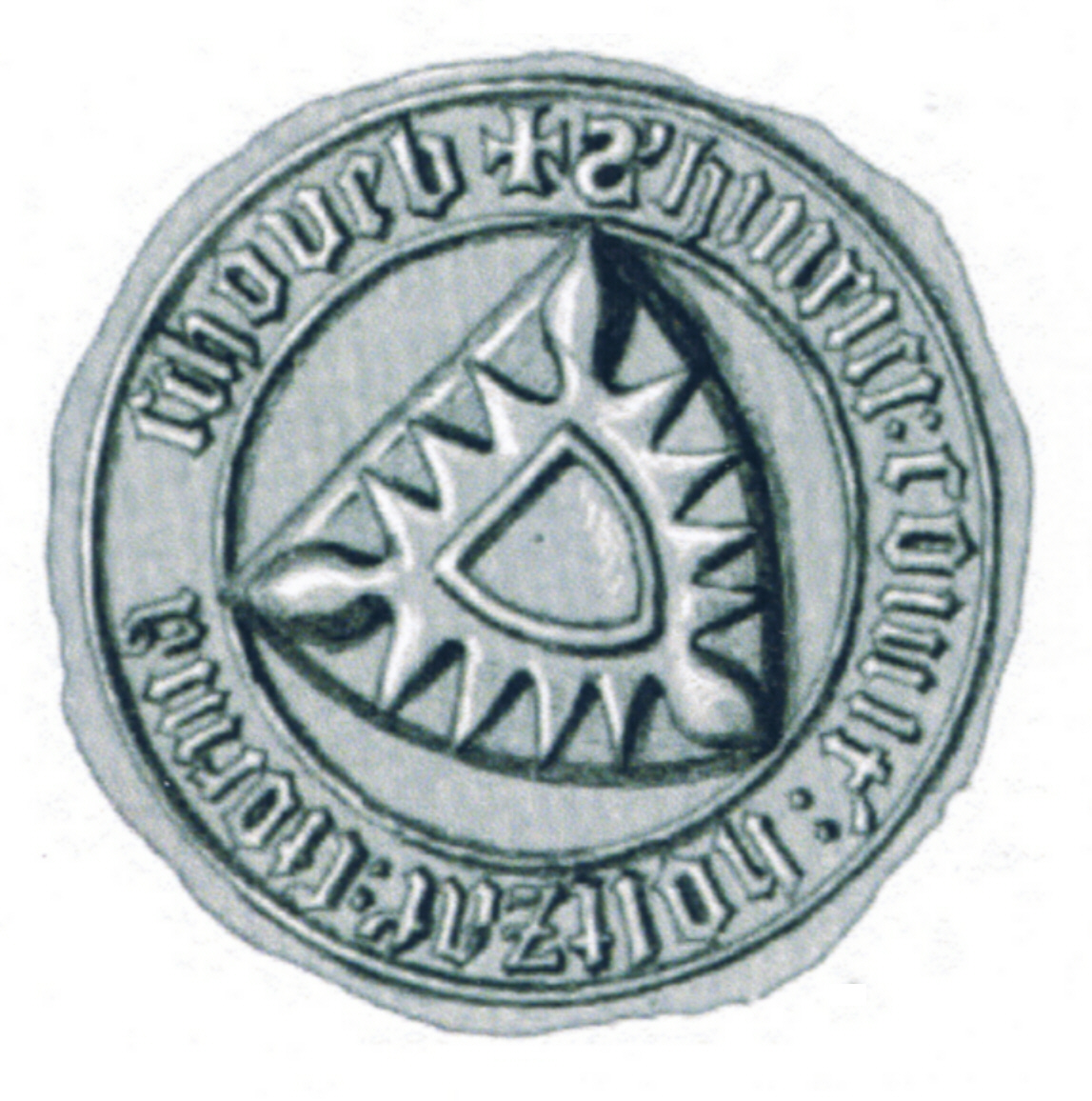
- Seal of Henry III, dated 1402
- Died: February 1421; Bordesholm
- Noble family: House of Schauenburg
- Father: Henry II, Count of Holstein-Rendsburg
- Mother: Ingeborg of Mecklenburg-Schwerin

Henry III, Count of Schauenburg-Holstein (d. February 1421 in Bordesholm) was Bishop of Osnabrück as Henry I from 1402 to 1410, and also Count of Holstein-Rendsburg from 1404 until his death.

He was the youngest son of Henry II and his second wife Ingeborg of Mecklenburg-Schwerin.

== Life ==
As a youngest son he was destined for a church career and became a deacon in Osnabrück. After the death of Bishop Dietrich in 1403, Henry was appointed as his successor. But then, both of his older brothers died young: Albert II fell off his horse in a battle against Dithmarschen in 1403 and Gerhard VI fell in the Battle on the Hamme. This left Henry III as his father's only surviving son, so he declared himself the heir, not only of Holstein-Rendsburg, but also of the Duchy of Schleswig, which had been given as a hereditary fief to Gerhard VI in 1386. Queen Margaret I of Denmark and her successor, King Eric I of Denmark objected. They saw this as an opportunity to bind Schleswig more strongly to Denmark.

Eric I invited Henry III and other nobility to Kolding. Henry was then lured to Hindsgavl on Fyn island, where he was arrested. For his release, he had to pay 11000mark and he had to pledge Flensburg to Denmark for a year. Eric accepted the transfer of Flensburg, but not Henry's money. This led to a war between Holstein-Rendsburg and Denmark. On 13 July 1409, Eric made an alliance with Ditmarsh. On 12 August 1410, armies from Holstein-Rendsburg and Denmark fought a battle in moorland near Sollerup in the district of Eggebek. Holstein-Rendsburg won, and the Danish army leader Mogens Munk fell in battle. On 26 March 1411, a compromise was negotiated in Kolding.

Margaret I died in October 1412 and the nobility from Holstein refused to return the territories they'd occupied in 1410, as had been agreed in the compromise of 1411. Eric I took the case to a feudal court in Nyborg, which ruled on 29 July 1413 that Henry III had forfeited his duchy. Danish troops then occupied Schleswig. Henry made an alliance with the city of Hamburg, which did not want a powerful neighbour.

In 1419, Danish troops conquered Fehmarn and looted it. Holstein-Rendsburg counterattacked and was victorious in the battle of Immerwad, near Haderslev. A new truce was agreed on 26 November 1420.

In early 1421, Henry III was elected Bishop of Schleswig. However, he died in February, before he could assume office.

Count Henry of Schauenburg House of Schauenburg Died: February 1421
Regnal titles
Catholic Church titles
Preceded by Dietrich of Horne	Prince-Bishop of Osnabrück as Henry I 1402–1410	Succeeded by Otto IV of Hoya
Regnal titles
Preceded by Gerhard VI	Count of Holstein-Rendsburg as Henry III; 1404–1421	Succeeded by Henry IV
