= Henry IV of Holstein-Rendsburg =

German noble (1397–1427)

Henry IV
- Duke of Schleswig; Count of Holstein-Rendsburg
- Born: 1397
- Died: 28 May 1427; Flensburg
- Buried: St. Lawrence church in Itzehoe
- Noble family: House of Schauenburg
- Father: Gerhard VI, Count of Holstein-Rendsburg
- Mother: Catherine Elisabeth of Brunswick-Lüneburg

Henry IV, Count of Holstein-Rendsburg (1397 – 28 May 1427) was Count of Holstein-Rendsburg and Duke of Schleswig from 1404 until his death.

== Life ==
Henry was the son of Gerhard VI of Holstein and Catherine Elisabeth of Brunswick-Lüneburg (d. 1417/1422) from the Holstein-Rendsburg line of the House of Schauenburg. His father, Gerhard VI, fell in battle on 4 August 1404 during an attempt to conquer Dithmarschen. Henry was seven years old at the time; his mother took up his guardianship, while the regency was taken up by his uncle Henry III.

Henry III had been at war with Denmark since 1408 over the Duchy of Schleswig. Henry III claimed it as a hereditary fief; the Danish Margaret I and later Eric VII, wanted the duchy for themselves. In 1413, the regency ended. Henry IV, together with his younger brothers Adolf VIII and Gerhard VII, continued the war with Denmark. In 1417, a cease fire was agreed, after mediation by the city of Lübeck. In 1423, the war continued.

On 28 June 1424 in Buda, Emperor Sigismund ruled in favour of the Danes; however, this did not end hostilities. Henry IV appealed to Pope Martin V to overrule the emperor's decision. However, this appeal was unsuccessful. In 1426, Danish troops occupied areas around the cities of Schleswig and Flensburg. Henry IV tried to gain support from the Hanseatic cities in Saxony, from the Frisians in Eiderstedt and even from the Victual Brothers.

During the Danish-Holstein-Hanseatic war Henry IV fell in battle on 28 May 1427, during the siege of Flensburg. He was buried in the St. Lawrence church in Itzehoe.

== Legacy ==
During Henry's rule as Duke of Schleswig, representatives of the North Frisian Hundreds gathered on 17 June 1426 on the island Föhr to record Frisian law in the Siebenhardenbeliebung. This is the oldest preserved formulation or Frisian law.

== Footnotes ==
Henry IV of Holstein-Rendsburg House of Schauenburg Born: 1397 Died: 28 May 1427
Danish nobility
Preceded by Gerhard II	Duke of Schleswig as Henry III; 1404-1427	Vacant Title next held by Adolph I
German nobility
Preceded by Henry III	Count of Holstein-Rendsburg as Henry IV; 1421-1427	Succeeded by Adolph VIII and Gerhard VII
