= Ingeborg of Holstein =

Swedish abbess

Ingeborg of Holstein (1396 – 14 October 1465), was Abbess of Vadstena Abbey 1447-1452 and 1457-1465.

She was the daughter of Gerhard VI, Count of Holstein-Rendsburg (d. 1404) and Catherine Elisabeth of Brunswick-Lüneburg. In 1408, she was placed in the convent by Queen Margaret I of Denmark by special consent of the Pope. She became a full member of the order in 1415. Due to her age, it is believed that she initially resided in her own house on the convent premises.

In 1447, she was appointed Abbess. Her election was controversial and an active opposition remained against her appointment. She had the loyal support of the confessor of the abbey, Magnus Unnonis.

Ingeborg was the maternal aunt of King Christian I of Denmark, which was likely the cause to why King Charles VIII of Sweden 25 April 1452 demanded that she and the confessor of the abbey, Magnus Unnonis, should be deposed. Bishop Nils König of Linköping saw no cause for this, but both Ingeborg and Unnonis stepped down in May. They were reinstated in their positions in 1457.

Ingeborg worked to install the so-called vårfrupenningen to a regular fee, a goal she succeeded with by permission of Charles VIII of Sweden in 1450, and again from Christian I of Denmark in 1461. In 1462, she received the papal legate Marinus de Fregeno in Vadstena. Upon the request of Christian I, she wrote the (C 50, UUB), Fjorton råd om ett gudeligt leverne (Fourteen Advises to live goodly), likely before his visit in 1461.

Ingeborg is believed to have supported the Roman side against Conciliarism and the new Papal policy of Concords and diplomacy, and opposed the national centralism of Charles VIII of Sweden.
