= Christian I of Denmark =

Scandinavian monarch under the Kalmar Union (1426–1481)

Christian I
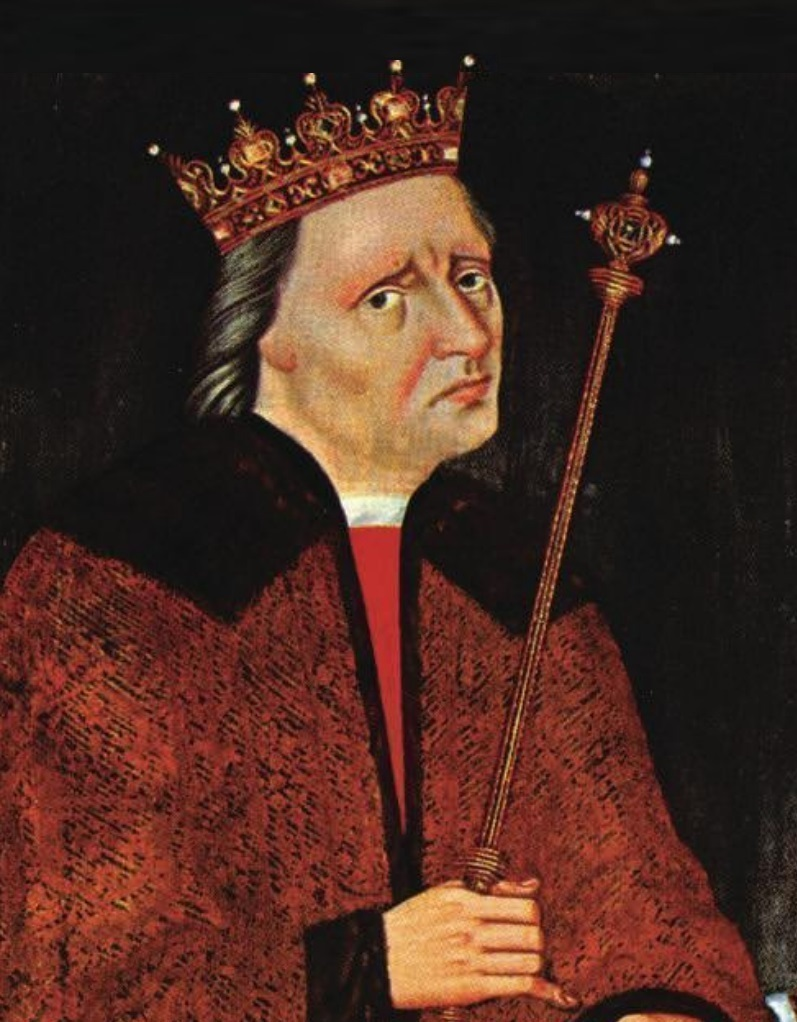
- Portrait at Frederiksborg Castle, 15th century

King of Denmark
- Reign: 1 September 1448 – 21 May 1481
- Coronation: 28 October 1449; Copenhagen Cathedral
- Predecessor: Christopher III
- Successor: John

King of Norway
- Reign: 13 May 1450 – 21 May 1481
- Coronation: 2 August 1450, Trondheim
- Predecessor: Karl I
- Successor: John

King of Sweden
- Reign: 23 June 1457 – 23 June 1464
- Coronation: 29 June 1457, Uppsala
- Predecessor: Karl VIII
- Successor: Karl VIII

Count of Oldenburg
- Reign: 14 February 1440 – 1 September 1448
- Predecessor: Dietrich I
- Successor: Gerhard VI
- Born: February 1426; Oldenburg, Holy Roman Empire
- Died: 21 May 1481 (aged 55); Copenhagen Castle, Kalmar Union
- Burial: Roskilde Cathedral
- Spouse: Dorothea of Brandenburg (m. 1449)
- Issue among others...: John, King of Denmark; Margaret, Queen of Scots; Frederick I, King of Denmark
- House: Oldenburg
- Father: Dietrich, Count of Oldenburg
- Mother: Hedvig of Holstein

Christian I (Christiern; February 1426 – 21 May 1481) was a German noble and Scandinavian monarch under the Kalmar Union. He was king of Denmark (1448–1481), Norway (1450–1481) and Sweden (1457–1464). From 1460 to 1481, he was also duke of Schleswig (within Denmark) and count (after 1474, duke) of Holstein (within the Holy Roman Empire). He was the first king of the House of Oldenburg.

In the power vacuum that arose following the death of King Christopher without a direct heir in 1448, Sweden elected Karl Knutsson king with the intent to reestablish the union under a Swedish king. Karl was elected king of Norway in the following year. However the counts of Holstein made the Danish Privy Council appoint Christian as king of Denmark. His subsequent accessions to the thrones of Norway (in 1450) and Sweden (in 1457) restored the unity of the Kalmar Union for a short period. In 1464, Sweden broke away from the union and Christian's attempt at a reconquest resulted in his defeat by the Swedish regent Sten Sture the Elder at the Battle of Brunkeberg in 1471.

In 1460, following the death of his maternal uncle, Duke Adolphus of Schleswig, Count of Holstein-Rendsburg, Christian also became Duke of Schleswig and Count of Holstein.

== Biography ==
=== Early years ===
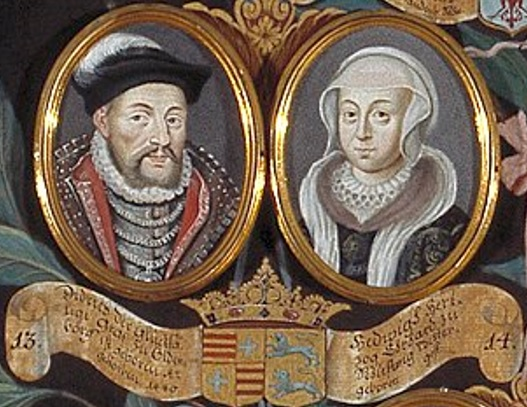
Christian's parents, Dietrich and Hedwig of Oldenburg, depicted in 1704

Christiern was born in February 1426 in Oldenburg in Northern Germany as the eldest son of Count Dietrich of Oldenburg with his second wife, Hedvig of Holstein. Christian had two younger brothers, Maurice and Gerhard VI, Count of Oldenburg, and one sister, Countess Adelheid von Mansfeld-Querfurt.

Through his father, he belonged to the House of Oldenburg, a comital family established since the 12th century in an area west of the River Weser in north-western Germany. Based on the two strongholds of Oldenburg and Delmenhorst, the family had gradually expanded its rule over the neighbouring Frisian tribes of the area. Christian's father was called the Fortunate as he had reunited and expanded the family's territory. Christian's mother, Hedvig, was a daughter of Gerhard VI, Count of Holstein, and a sister of Adolphus, Duke of Schleswig. Through his mother, Christian descended from King Eric V of Denmark through his daughter Richeza, and from King Abel of Denmark through his daughter Sophie. Through his father, he descended from King Eric IV of Denmark through his daughter Sophia. Christian was therefore descended through female lines from all three surviving sons of Valdemar II and his second wife, Berengaria of Portugal. He was also a descendant of King Magnus III of Sweden.

At the death of their father in 1440, Christian and his brothers jointly succeeded Dietrich as Count of Oldenburg and Delmenhorst. Christian was raised by his uncle, Duke Adolphus of Schleswig, Count of Holstein, as the childless duke wished for his young nephew to become his heir, and also succeeded in having Christian elected as his successor in the Duchy of Schleswig.

=== King of Denmark ===
In January 1448, King Christopher of Denmark, Sweden and Norway died suddenly and without natural heirs. His death resulted in the break-up of the union of the three kingdoms, as Denmark and Sweden went their separate ways and Norway's affiliation was unclear. The vacant Danish throne was first offered by the Council of the Realm to Duke Adolphus of Schleswig, being the most prominent feudal lord of Danish dominions. The duke declined and recommended his nephew, Count Christian of Oldenburg. Before being elected, Christian had to promise to obey to the Constitutio Valdemariana, a provision in the ascension promissory of King Valdemar III of Denmark, that promised that in the future, the same person could never be both ruler of the Duchy of Schleswig and Denmark simultaneously. The council also demanded that Christian should marry dowager queen Dorothea of Brandenburg (ca 1430–1495), widow of his predecessor King Christopher III. On 1 September 1448, after signing his ascension promissory, count Christian was elected to the Danish throne as king Christian I at the assembly in Viborg. His coronation was held on 28 October 1449, in the Church of Our Lady in Copenhagen, at which occasion his marriage with dowager queen Dorothea was also celebrated.

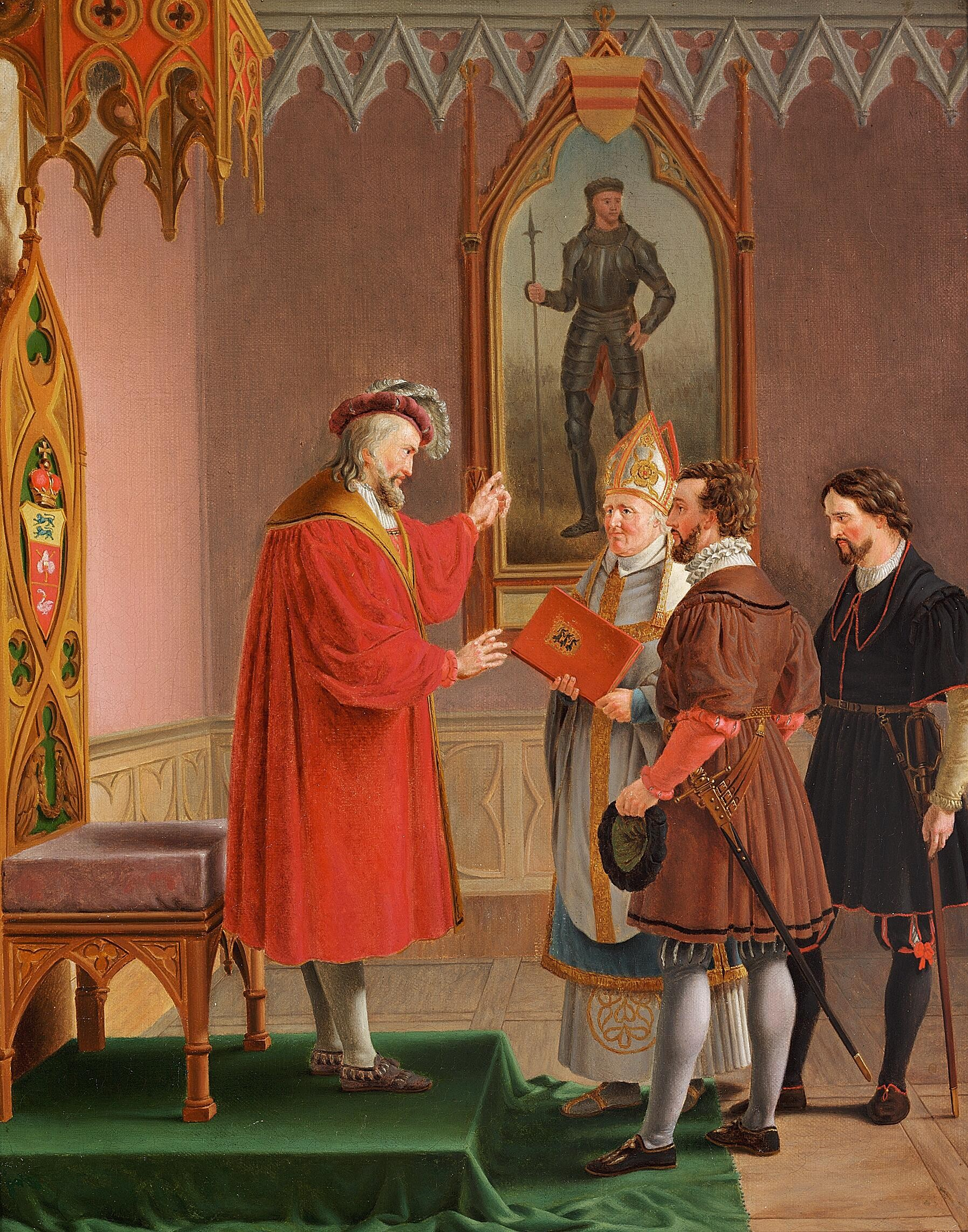
Duke Adolph declining the offer of the Danish throne and recommending his nephew, Count Christian of Oldenburg. History painting by Christoffer Wilhelm Eckersberg, 1819.

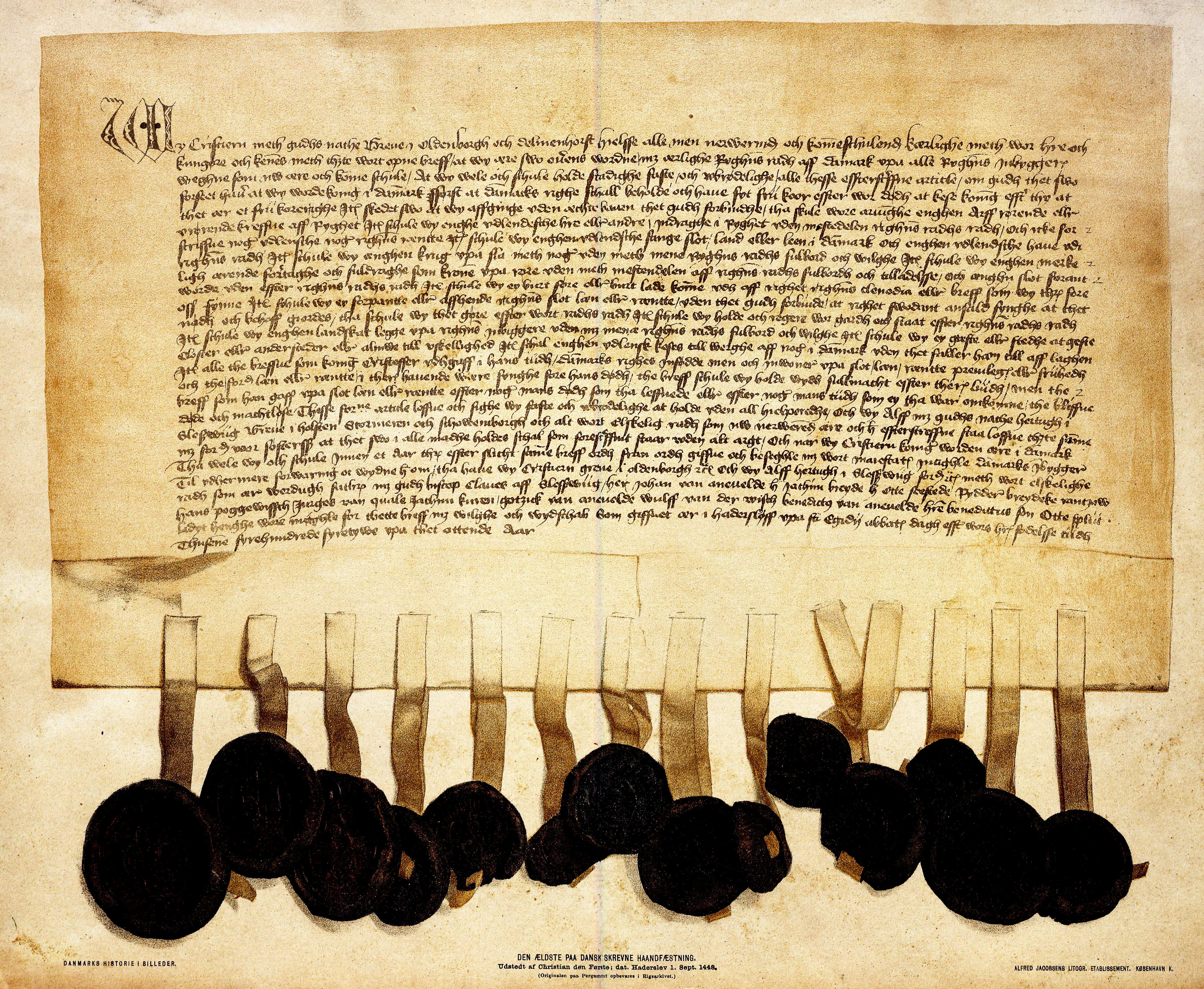
The ascension promissory of Christian I

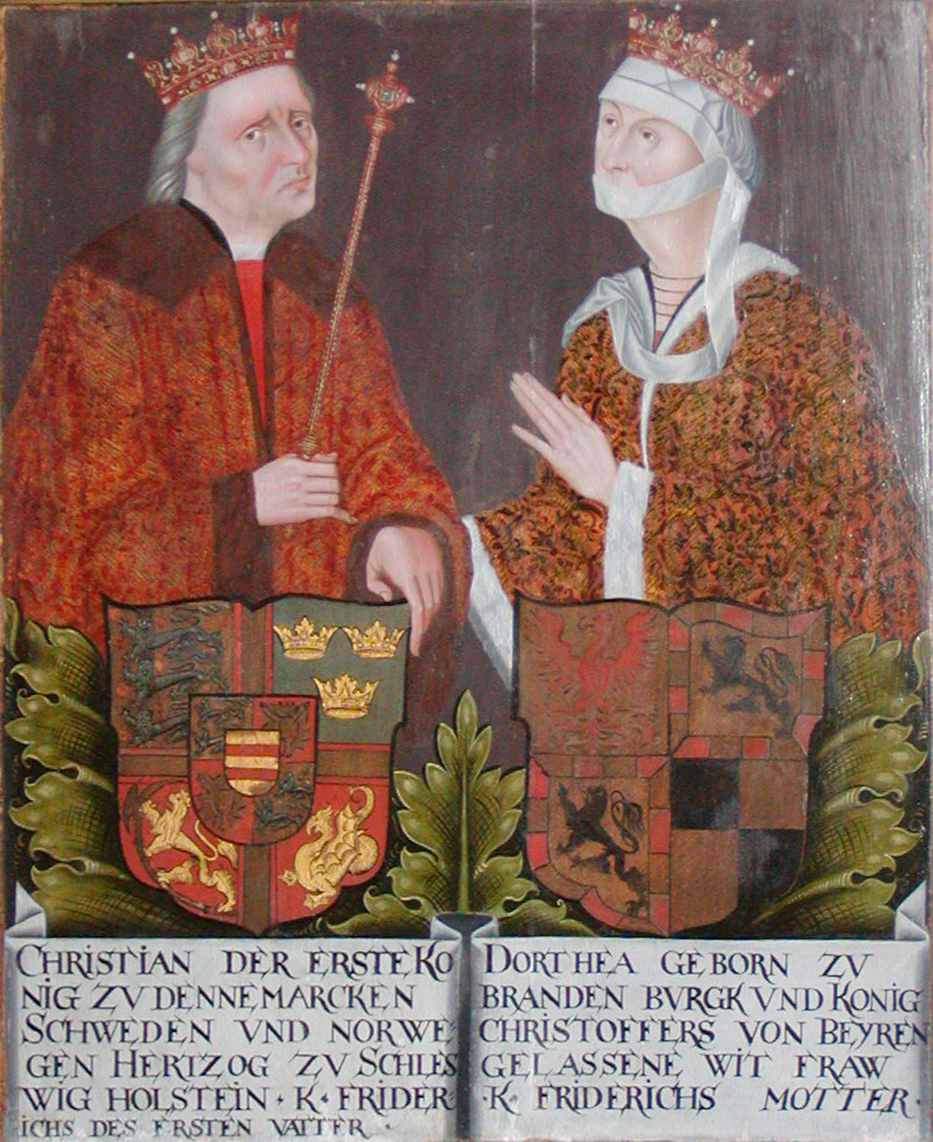
King Christian I and Queen Dorothea

=== King of Sweden and Norway ===
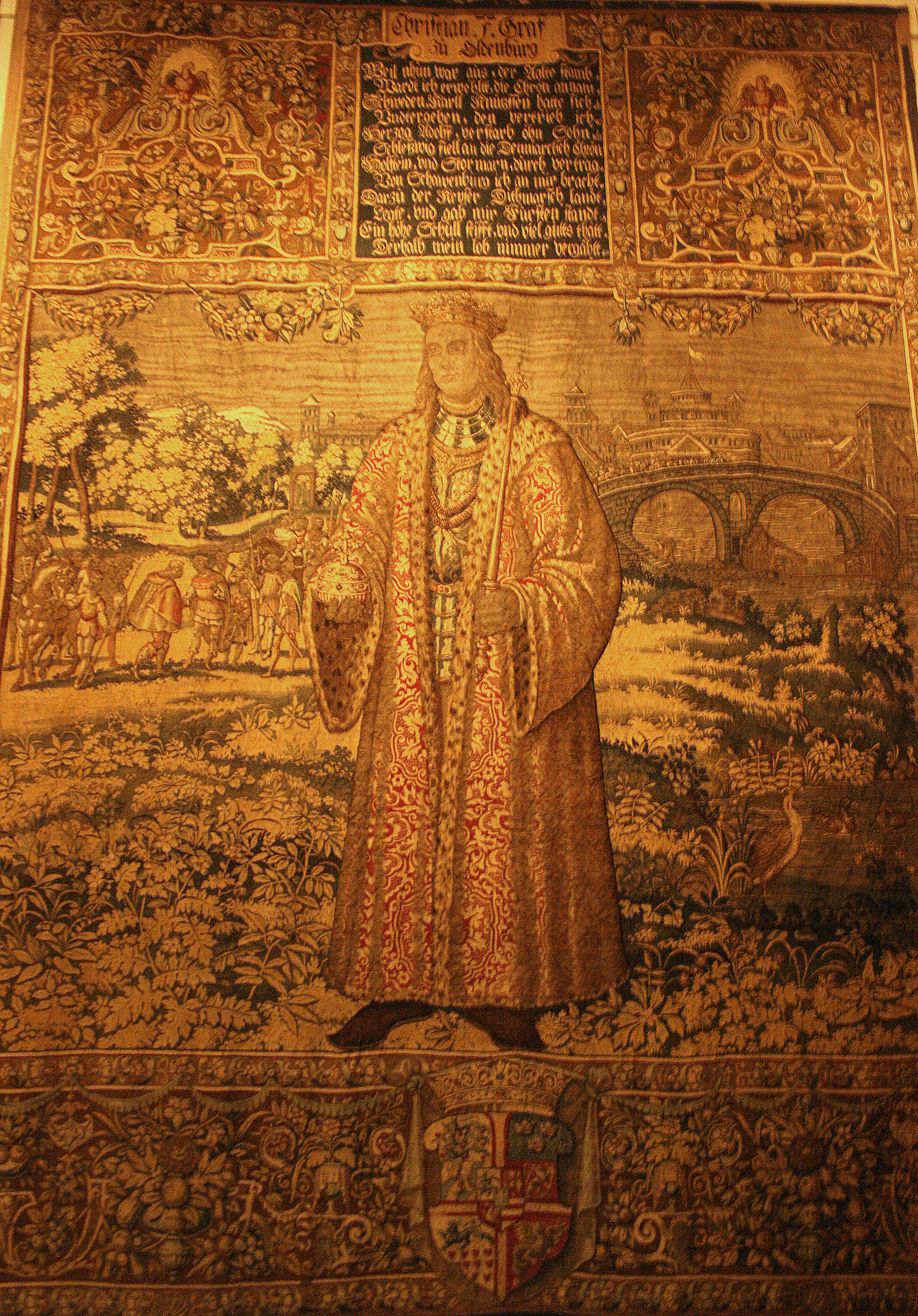
Tapestry with a portrait of Christian I

Meanwhile, Sweden had on 20 June 1448 elected Karl Knutsson Bonde as king. Norway was now faced with the choice between a union with Denmark or Sweden, or electing a separate king. The latter option was quickly discarded, and a power-struggle ensued between the supporters of Christian of Denmark and Karl of Sweden. The Norwegian Council of the Realm was divided. In February 1449, a part of the Council declared in favour of Karl as king, but on 15 June the same year, a different group of councillors paid homage to Christian. On 20 November, Karl was crowned king of Norway in Trondheim.

However, the Swedish nobility now took steps to avoid war with Denmark. In June 1450, the Swedish Council of the Realm forced Karl to renounce his claim on Norway to Christian. In the summer of 1450, Christian sailed to Norway with a large fleet, and on 2 August he was crowned king of Norway in Trondheim. On 29 August, a union treaty between Denmark and Norway was signed in Bergen. Norway had of old been a hereditary monarchy, but this had become less and less a reality, as at the last royal successions, hereditary claims had been bypassed for political reasons. It was now explicitly stated that Norway, as well as Denmark, was an elective monarchy. The treaty stipulated that Denmark and Norway should have the same king in perpetuity, and that he would be elected among the legitimate sons of the previous king, if such existed.

Karl Knutsson became increasingly unpopular as king of Sweden, and was driven into exile in 1457. Christian achieved his aim of being elected as king of Sweden, thus re-establishing the Kalmar Union. He received the power from temporary Swedish regents Archbishop Jöns Bengtsson Oxenstierna and lord Erik Axelsson Tott. However, Sweden being volatile and split by factions (benefits of union being against nationalistic benefits), his reign there ended in 1464 when Kettil Karlsson Vasa, Bishop of Linköping was installed as the next regent. Karl Knutsson was recalled as King of Sweden, although he was later exiled a second time, recalled again and died during his third term as king. Christian's final attempt at regaining Sweden ended in a total military failure at the Battle of Brunkeberg (outside Stockholm) October 1471 where he was defeated by forces on Swedish regent Sten Sture the Elder (Swedish: Sten Sture den äldre). Christian maintained his claim to the Swedish kingdom up to his death in 1481.

=== Duke and Count ===
In 1460 King Christian also became Duke of Schleswig, a Danish fief, and Count of Holstein-Rendsburg, a Saxe-Lauenburgian subfief within the Holy Roman Empire. Christian inherited Holstein-Rendsburg and Schleswig after a short "interregnum" as the eldest son of the sister of late Duke Adolphus VIII, Duke of Schleswig (Southern Jutland) and Count of Holstein, of the Schauenburg fürst clan, who died 4 December 1459, without heirs. Christian's succession was confirmed by the Estates of the Realm (nobility and representatives) of these duchies in Ribe 5 March 1460 (Treaty of Ribe). In 1474 Lauenburg's liege lord Emperor Frederick III elevated Christian I as Count of Holstein to Duke of Holstein, thus becoming an immediate imperial vassal (see imperial immediacy).

=== Later reign ===
Christian's personal territory was at its largest in 1460–1464, before the loss of Sweden. However, many parts of his realm wanted to govern themselves locally, and there were constant struggles. Denmark was his most important center of power.

Acting on a permission from Pope Sixtus IV in 1475 to establish a university in Denmark, the University of Copenhagen was inaugurated by Christian on 1 June 1479.

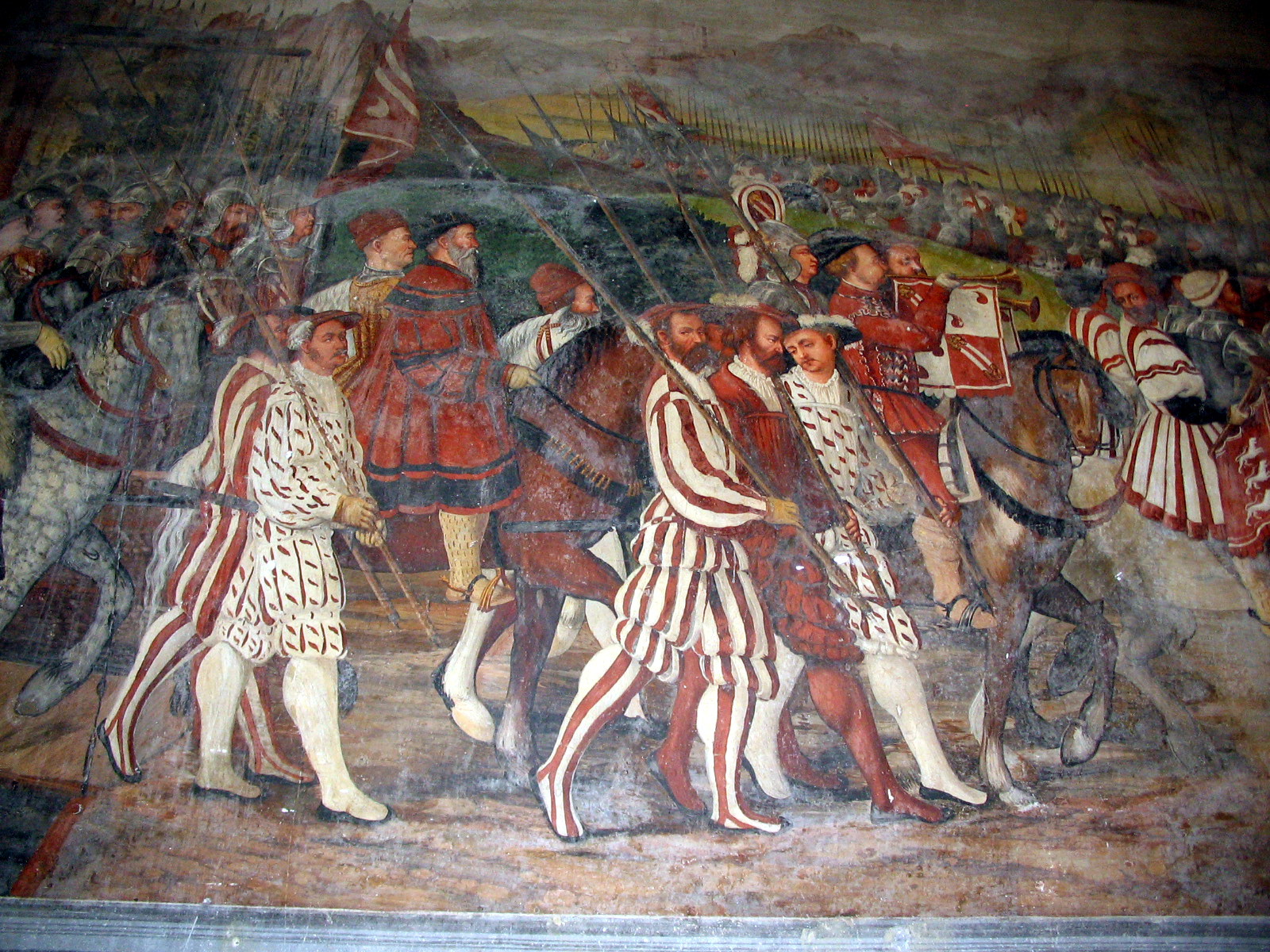
Christian's visit to Malpaga Castle near Bergamo, where Venetian Captain-General Bartolomeo Colleoni hosted a banquet in his honour.

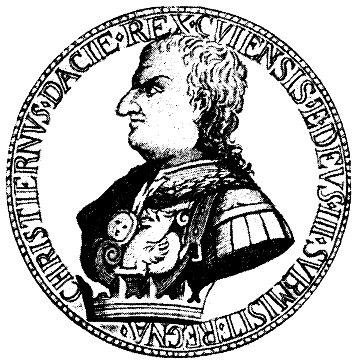
Medal of Christian I, made during his journey through Italy.

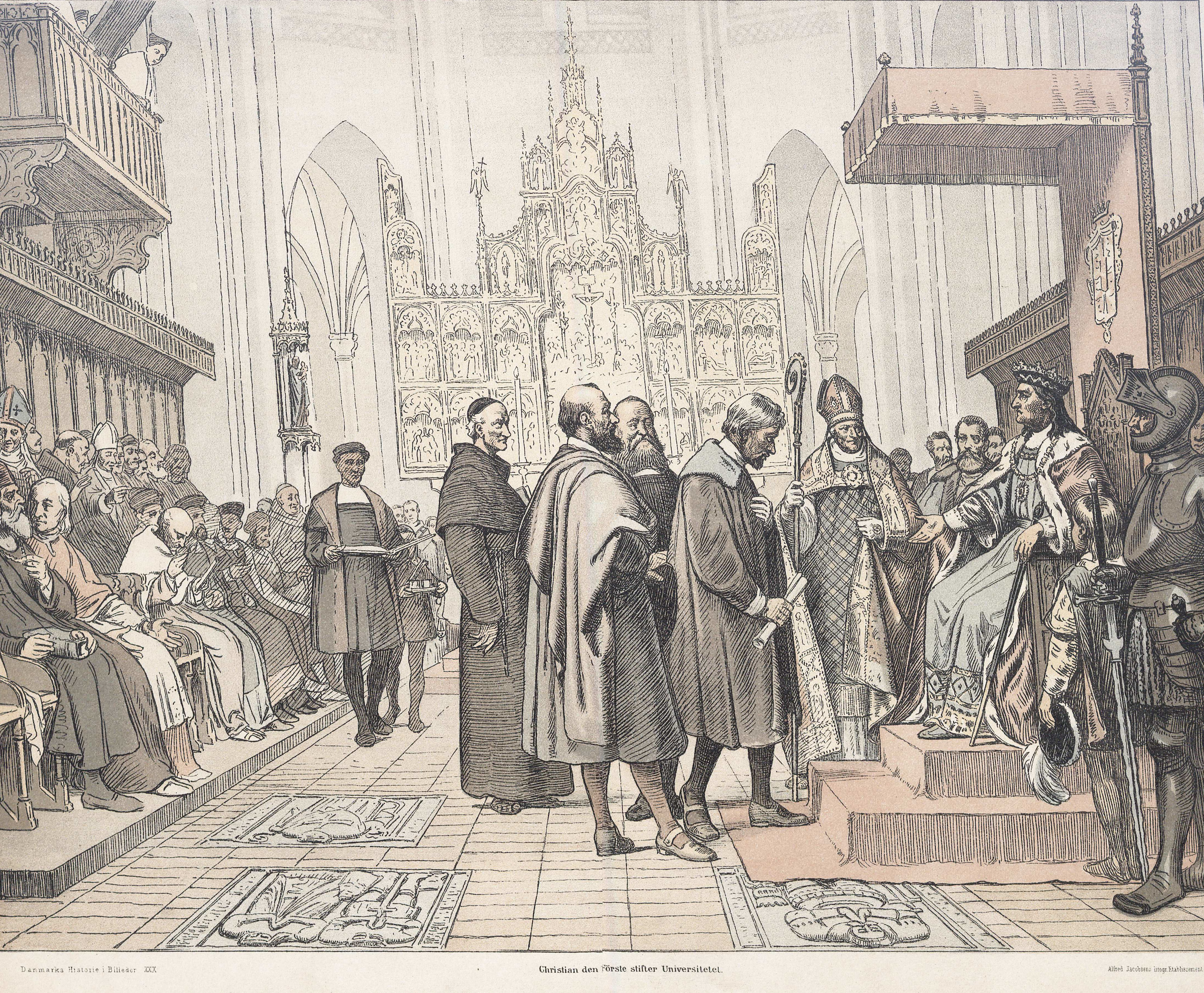
Rendition of Christian I establishing the University of Copenhagen.

=== Death and burial ===
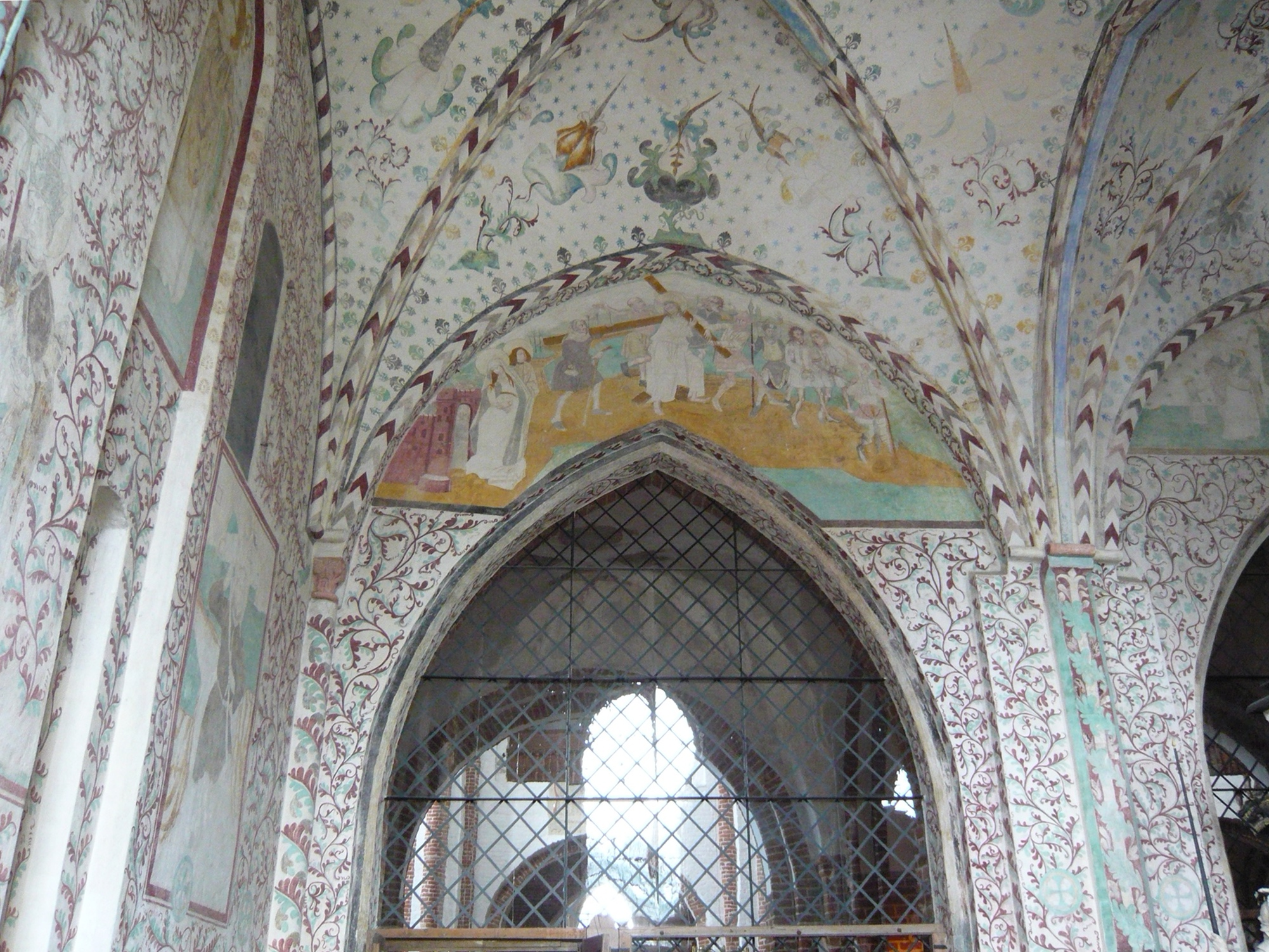
The Gothic frescos of the Chapel of the Magi, showing amongst others Jesus carrying his cross on Via Dolorosa.

King Christian died at Copenhagen Castle on 21 May 1481 at the age of 55. He was interred at the Chapel of the Magi at Roskilde Cathedral, a richly decorated chapel he and Queen Dorothea had erected to serve as a family sepulchral chapel for the House of Oldenburg. The burials of Christian I and Queen Dorothea are marked with a pair of simple stones, as the chapel itself was to be considered their sepulchral monument.

== Legacy ==
The dynasty he founded, the House of Oldenburg, remains on the throne of Denmark. It was on the throne of Norway until 1818, returning there again from 1905, and also on the throne of Sweden during Christian's reign there and those of his son and grandson), but also 1751–1818.

== Arms ==
Coat of arms as Count of Oldenburg.

Coat of arms as King of Denmark, the Goths and the Wends.

Coat of arms as King of Denmark, Sweden, Norway and the Wends.

Coat of arms as King of Denmark, Sweden, Norway and the Wends and Duke of Schleswig-Holstein.

Coat of arms on fresco in Roskilde Cathedral, alongside Queen Dorothea's coat of arms (right)

== Ancestry ==
Ancestors of Christian I of Denmark

8. Conrad I, Count of Oldenburg
4. Christian V, Count of Oldenburg
9. Ingeborg of Holstein-Plön
2. Dietrich, Count of Oldenburg
10. Dietrich V, Count of Hohnstein-Heringen
5. Agnes of Hohnstein-Heringen
11. Sophie of Brunswick
1. Christian I of Denmark
12. Henry II, Count of Holstein-Rendsburg
6. Gerhard VI, Count of Holstein-Rendsburg
13. Ingeborg of Mecklenburg
3. Hedvig of Holstein
14. Magnus II, Duke of Brunswick-Lüneburg
7. Catherine Elisabeth of Brunswick
15. Catherine of Anhalt-Bernburg

=== Danish royal descent ===
House of Estridsen
Valdemar II of Denmark
Christopher I of Denmark	Abel, King of Denmark	Eric IV of Denmark
Eric V of Denmark	Sophie, Princess of Anhalt-Bernburg	Sophia, Queen of Sweden
Richeza of Denmark	Bernhard II, Prince of Anhalt-Bernburg	Ingeborg, Countess of Holstein-Plön
Sophie of Mecklenburg-Werle	Bernhard III, Prince of Anhalt-Bernburg	Gerhard IV, Count of Holstein-Plön
Henry II, Count of Holstein-Rendsburg	Catherine of Anhalt-Bernburg	Ingeborg, Countess of Oldenburg
Gerhard VI, Count of Holstein-Rendsburg	Catherine Elisabeth of Brunswick-Lüneburg	Christian V, Count of Oldenburg
Hedvig of Holstein	Dietrich, Count of Oldenburg
Christian I
House of Oldenburg

== Issue ==
Name	Birth	Death	Notes
Olaf	1450	1451	
Canute	1451	1455	
John	2 February 1455	20 February 1513	King of Denmark, Norway and Sweden. Had issue.
Margaret	23 June 1456	14 July 1486	Married King James III of Scotland in 1469. Had issue.
Frederick I	7 October 1471	10 April 1533	King of Denmark and Norway. Had issue.

== See also ==
- List of Danish monarchs
- Danish monarch's family tree

Christian I House of Oldenburg Born: February 1426 Died: 21 May 1481
Regnal titles
Preceded by Theodoric	Count of Oldenburg as Christian VII; 1440–1448	Succeeded by Gerhard VI
Preceded by Christopher III	King of Denmark; 1448–1481	Succeeded by John
Preceded by Karl	King of Norway; 1450–1481	Vacant Regency held by Jon Svaleson Smør Title next held by John
Vacant Regency held by Jöns Bengtsson Oxenstierna and Erik Axelsson Tott Title last held by Karl VIII	King of Sweden; 1457–1464	Vacant Regency held by Kettil Karlsson (Vasa) Title next held by Karl VIII
Preceded by Adolf VIII	Count of Holstein-Rendsburg; 1460–1474	Became duke
Preceded by Adolf VIII	Duke of Schleswig; 1460–1481	Succeeded by John I and Frederick I
Became duke	Duke of Holstein; 1474–1481	Succeeded by John I and Frederick I
