= Conrad I of Oldenburg =

Count of Oldenburg from 1324 to 1347

Conrad I

Count of Oldenburg
- Reign: 1324–1347
- Predecessor: John III with Christian IV
- Successor: John IV with Conrad II
- Died: 1347; Oldenburg
- Noble family: Oldenburg
- Spouse: Ingeborg of Holstein-Plön
- Issue: Conrad II; Gerhard of Oldenburg; Christian V
- Father: John II
- Mother: Hedwig of Diepholz

Conrad I of Oldenburg (German: Konrad I. von Oldenburg; died 1347) was Count of Oldenburg from 1324 until his death. He initially ruled jointly with his elder half-brother John III. Following John's death in 1342, Conrad ruled alone until 1345, when his nephew John IV joined him as co-ruler.

Conrad was a son of John II and his second wife, Hedwig of Diepholz. He married Ingeborg of Holstein. Their sons included:

- Conrad II (died 1401), who succeeded his father jointly with John IV;
- Gerhard of Oldenburg (died 1368);
- Christian V (died 1399).

Conrad I of Oldenburg House of Oldenburg Died: 1347
Regnal titles
Preceded by John III with Christian IV	Count of Oldenburg; 1324–1347 with his half-brother John III (1324–1342) his nephew John IV (1345–1347)	Succeeded by John IV with Conrad II
