= Christian V of Oldenburg =

Count of Oldenburg from 1368 to 1398

Christian V

Count of Oldenburg
- Reign: 1368–1398
- Predecessor: Conrad II
- Successor: Conrad II
- Born: c. 1342
- Died: 1399
- Noble family: Oldenburg
- Spouse: Agnes of Honstein
- Issue: Christian VI; Dietrich
- Father: Conrad I
- Mother: Ingeborg of Holstein-Plön

Christian V (c. 1342 – 1399) was Count of Oldenburg from 1368 until 1398, ruling jointly with his elder brother Conrad II. He was a son of Conrad I and Ingeborg of Holstein-Plön. Christian was initially intended for an ecclesiastical career and held a prebend as a canon at Cologne Cathedral. By 1368, however, he had relinquished his ecclesiastical position and joined his brother in the government of Oldenburg.

In 1377, Christian married Agnes of Honstein. They had two sons, Christian VI and Dietrich. After Christian's death in 1399, Conrad II again ruled Oldenburg alone.

Christian V of Oldenburg House of Oldenburg Born: c. 1342 Died: after 6 April 1399
Regnal titles
Preceded by Conrad I with John IV	Count of Oldenburg; 1368–1398 with his cousin John IV and (1345–1356) his brother Conrad II (1368–1401)	Succeeded by Conrad II
