= Catherine Elisabeth of Brunswick =

Catherine Elisabeth of Brunswick-Lüneburg
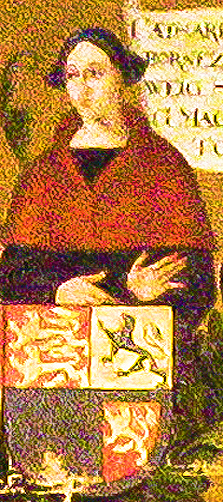
- Born: 1367
- Died: after 1423
- Noble family: Welf
- Spouse: Gerhard VI, Count of Holstein-Rendsburg
- Issue: Ingeborg of Holstein; Henry IV, Count of Holstein-Rendsburg; Hedvig of Holstein; Adolf VIII, Count of Holstein; Gerhard VII, Count of Holstein-Rendsburg
- Father: Magnus II, Duke of Brunswick-Lüneburg
- Mother: Catherine of Anhalt-Bernburg

Catherine Elisabeth of Brunswick-Lüneburg (c. 1367 – after 1423) was Duchess consort of Schleswig and Countess consort of Holstein-Rendsburg. She was the regent of some of the fiefs of her son Henry during his minority from 1404 to 1415.

== Biography ==
She was a daughter of Magnus II, Duke of Brunswick-Lüneburg and Catherine of Anhalt-Bernburg, daughter of Bernhard III, Prince of Anhalt-Bernburg. Through her mother, she was the great-great-granddaughter of King Abel of Denmark. She would also become the grandmother of Christian I of Denmark.

Catherine Elisabeth was in fact likely named only Catherine; she was often referred to as Elisabeth in older literature, but this was likely due to a mixup with her younger sister, who was named Elisabeth. In the 14th century, it was still rare to have two first names such as "Catherine Elisabeth". Due to this confusion, however, she has sometimes been referred to by both names.

Catherine Elisabeth was engaged in 1390 and married in 1395 to Gerhard VI, Count of Holstein-Rendsburg.

=== Regency ===
In 1404, Catherine Elisabeth was widowed while her son, successor to her spouse, was still a minor. She thereby became regent, but was forced to relent to her former brother-in-law, Bishop Henry of Osnabrück, and the guardian regency of the Duchy of Schleswig as well as the custody of her son, Duke Henry, to Queen Margaret I of Denmark and King Erik; her son Duke Henry was taken to Denmark, and her daughter Ingeborg was sent by Queen Margaret to Vadstena Abbey in Sweden. In the following years, Queen Margaret acquired large parts of Schleswig as security (Tønder fief, Frisland, episcopal manors in Svabsted and Stubbe) and by purchase (Trøjborg, Skinkelborg and Grødersby); King Erik took over Haderslev fief as security from the fiefholder Helene Ahlefeldt, and the queen, Flensborg.

However, in 1408, when Gottorp was about to be taken over by the Danish crown, Catherine Elisabeth called her son Henry back from Denmark and had a declaration of hostility sent to King Erik on 14 June 1410. This led to a number of feuds, instability and the pawning of several fiefs. Her own dower lands of Als, Ærø and Sundeved were taken by King Erik. Several foreign princes, among them her brother Henry the Mild, Duke of Brunswick-Lüneburg, tried to intervene and mediate but without lasting peace.

=== Later life ===
In 1415, her son Henry was declared of legal majority, the reign of Catherine Elisabeth ended and she is no longer mentioned much in the documents. In 1417, she was present in Rendsborg at her son's side when King Erik took Schleswig and Henry was forced to seek help from Hamburg. In 1423, her sons submitted a complaint that their mother had been assaulted by the royal soldiers despite the promise that she was to be left out of the conflict: her carriage had been attacked and her male staff had been mugged and captured. This is the last time she is mentioned.

== Issue ==
She had three sons and two daughters:

- Ingeborg of Holstein (1396–1465), Abbess at Vadstena Abbey 1447-1452 and 1457–1465
- Henry IV, Count of Holstein-Rendsburg (1397–1427)
- Hedvig of Holstein (1398–1436)
- Adolf VIII, Count of Holstein (1401–1459)
- Gerhard VII, Count of Holstein-Rendsburg (1404–1433)
