= House of Schaumburg =

- Country: Germany, Denmark
- Founded: c. 1100
- Final ruler: Otto V
- Titles: Count of Schaumburg; Count of Holstein; Duke of Schleswig
- Estate: County of Schaumburg
- Dissolution: 1640

The House of Schaumburg was a dynasty of German rulers. Until c. 1485, it was also known as the House of Schauenburg. Together with its ancestral possession, the County of Schaumburg, the family also ruled the County of Holstein and its partitions Holstein-Itzehoe, Holstein-Kiel, Holstein-Pinneberg (till 1640), Holstein-Plön, Holstein-Segeberg and Holstein-Rendsburg (till 1460) and through the latter at times also the Duchy of Schleswig.

== History ==
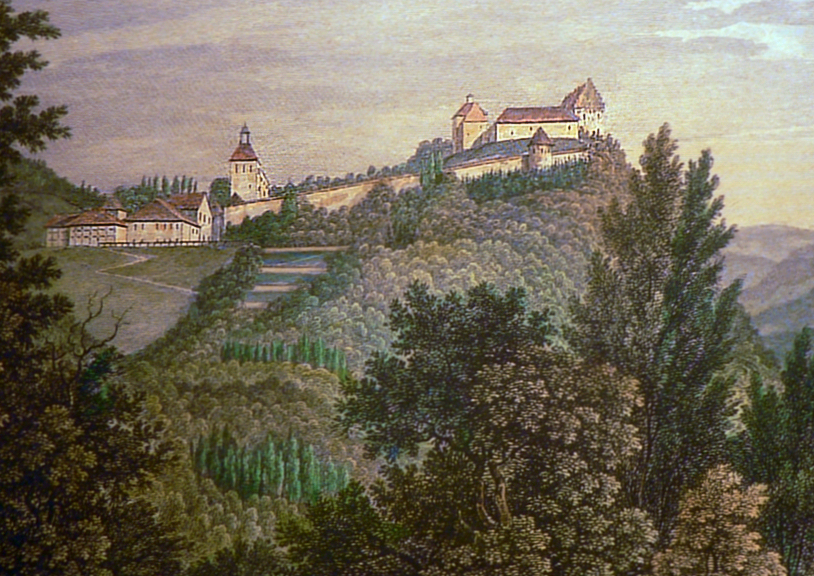
Schaumburg Castle, ancestral seat of the House of Schaumburg, circa 1800.

The Schaumburgs were named after Schauenburg Castle, near Rinteln on the Weser, where the owners started calling themselves Lords (from 1295 Counts) of Schauenburg. Adolf I probably became the first Lord of Schauenburg in 1106.

In 1110, Adolf I, Lord of Schauenburg was appointed by Lothair, Duke of Saxony to hold Holstein and Stormarn, including Hamburg, as fiefs.

Holstein was occupied by Denmark after the Battle of Stellau (1201), but was reconquered by the Count of Schauenburg and his allies in the Battle of Bornhöved (1227).

After the death in 1640 of Count Otto V without children, the House of Schaumburg became extinct. The County of Holstein-Pinneberg was merged with the Duchy of Holstein. The County of Schaumburg proper was partitioned among the Schaumburg heirs into three parts, one incorporated into the ducal Brunswick and Lunenburgian Principality of Lüneburg, the second becoming the County of Schaumburg-Lippe and the third continuing the name County of Schaumburg, ruled in personal union by Hesse-Cassel.

== States ruled by the House of Schaumburg ==
- County of Schaumburg: c. 1106–1640; held in personal union with Holstein, later with Holstein-Itzehoe and Holstein-Pinneberg
- County of Holstein: 1110–1137, 1142–1203 and 1227–1261
- County of Holstein-Kiel: 1261–1390
- County of Holstein-Itzehoe: 1261–1290; held with Schaumburg
- County of Holstein-Segeberg: 1273–1315 and 1397–1403
- County of Holstein-Pinneberg: 1290–1640; held with Schaumburg
- County of Holstein-Rendsburg: 1290–1459
- Duchy of Schleswig: 1326–1330 and 1375–1459

== See also ==
- Counts of Schauenburg and Holstein
