= War in Gotland (1398) =

Teutonic invasion of Gotland

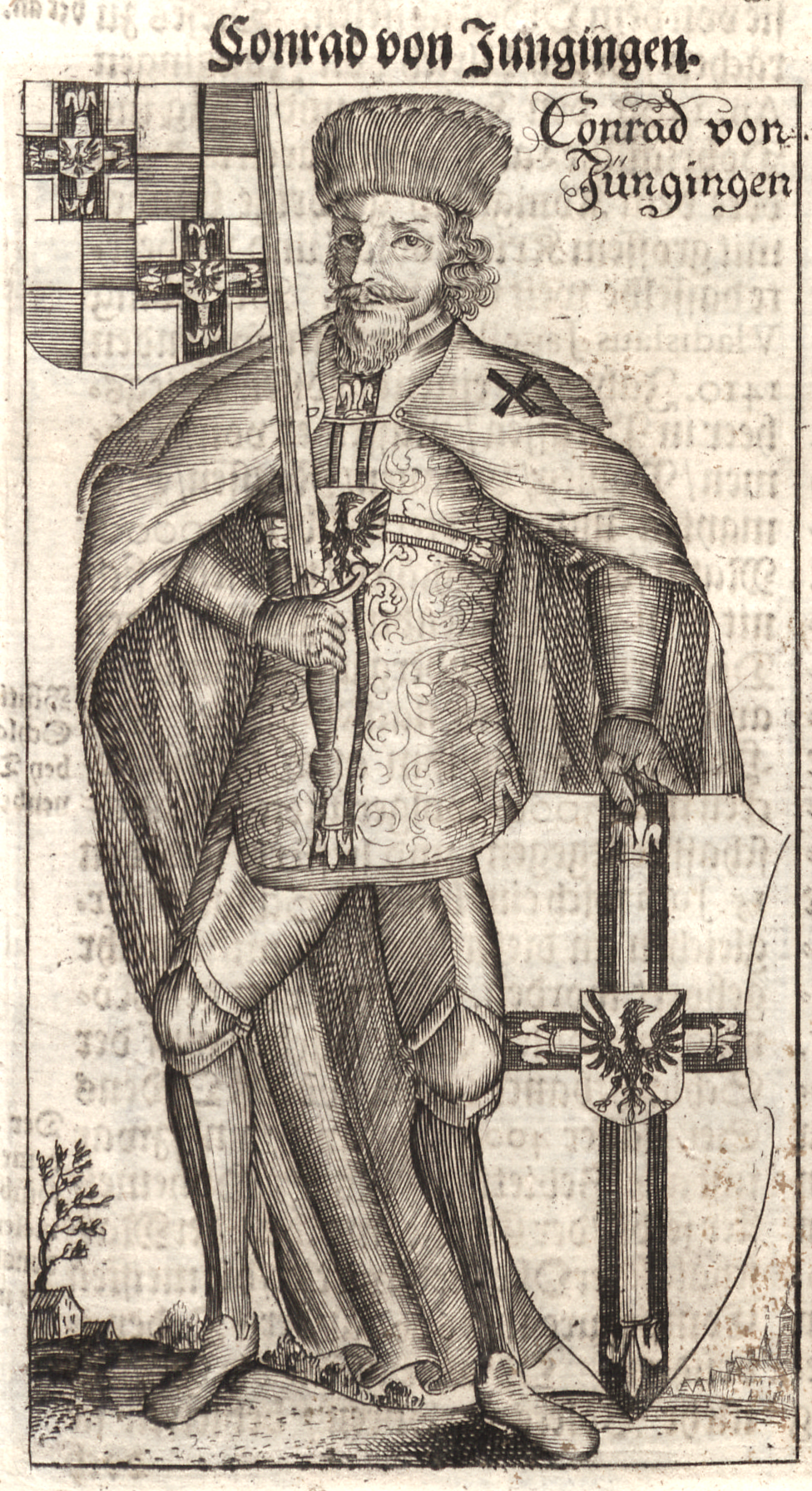
- Konrad von Jungingen
Date	21 March – 5 April 1398
Location	Gotland
Result	Teutonic victory
Territorial changes	Gotland is conquered by the Teutonic Order

Belligerents
Victual Brothers	(State of the Teutonic Order) Teutonic Order

Commanders and leaders
Sven Sture	(State of the Teutonic Order) Konrad von Jungingen

Strength
400+ men	4,000 men 84 ships

Casualties and losses
Unknown	Unknown

The War in Gotland (1398), also called the Gotland campaign of the Teutonic Knights was an invasion to the island of Gotland in 1398 by the Teutonic Order.

In the 1390s, Gotland was engulfed in the turmoil of the ongoing war between the Mecklenburgs and Margaret I. This conflict made the Baltic Sea a haven for pirates, the Victual Brothers and various raiders. Merchant ships and agriculture faced constant threat. In response to the situation, Konrad von Jungingen, the Master of the Teutonic Order, decided to invade Gotland.

The invasion was a success. The pirates were driven out of Gotland and the disruption of Baltic Sea trade ended.

== Background ==
In 1396, Eric, the son of Albrecht of Mecklenburg, conquered Gotland with the support of the Victual Brothers. Sven Sture, who had been Queen Margareta's commander on Gotland, switched sides after the invasion and allied himself with the Mecklenburgs and the Victual Brothers. When Eric died suddenly in July 1397, his widow Sophie appointed Sven to rule over Gotland. Sven struck a deal with the Victual Brothers: in exchange for surrendering half of their loot, they would be allowed to use Gotland as a sanctuary. This arrangement significantly increased pirate activity on the island and disrupted Baltic Sea trade. Duke Johan of Mecklenburg went to the island to support Eric's widow and to assume control over the Victual Brothers, but he was unable to manage the situation.

When the attempts to find a diplomatic solution failed, the Grand Master of the Teutonic Order called up a meeting to consider use of force. In January 1398, the Order and the leading Prussian cities Danzig, Thorn, Elbing, Königsberg and Braunsberg decided on a joint effort to invade Gotland.

== War ==
On 17 March 1398, a fleet from Danzig consisting of 84 ships and 4,000 men along with 400 horses embarked towards Gotland. On 21 March the Teutonic fleet arrived at Klintehamn and Sven Sture, who was the commander of the island, was forced to retreat to the strongly fortified city of Visby. He attempted to mobilize the burghers in Visby for a fight against the Teutonic army, but they did not show any interest in doing so. Due to his military disadvantage, Sven retreated to the towers of Smal-Henrik and Segeltornet and prepared a defense. However, the weather prevented the Teutonic force from advancing, and heavy snowfall made the transportation of siege weapons difficult. Instead of a siege, negotiations were initiated.

=== Negotiations ===
On 5 April 1398, an agreement was finally reached, with an armistice being signed. The city of Visby was formally handed over to Johan of Mecklenburg, together with the entire island. In detail, the agreement allowed for free passage of merchants from the Hanseatic League, to clear the entirety of Gotland from the Teutonic Order's enemies, to destroy the castles, to make restitution for the stolen goods, and to preserve the rights and privileges of Visby. Any pirates who remained on the island were captured and killed.

== Aftermath ==
The result of the invasion was a complete success. The Teutonic Order accomplished what it set out to do, the disruption of Baltic trade ended; the Baltic Sea was pacified, which was ultimate goal of the expedition.

=== Teutonic rule ===
The period of Teutonic rule over the island worked well and lasted for 10 years, the knights tried their hardest to restore a normal legal system and restore the people's trust in authority. They were also able to repel the pirates from the island, and stopped indiscriminate plundering. At Visby's city wall, they began construction of a new fortification, which would later become Visborg. There are also documents of the Order's high priest, Johan von Techwitz, personally cooperated with Gotland's county judges in disputes between farmers.

== See also ==
- War in Gotland (1403–1404) – Dano-Swedish invasion of Gotland
