= War in Gotland (1403–1404) =

Dano-Swedish invasion of Gotland

Date	November 11, 1403 – July 1, 1404
Location	Gotland
Result	Teutonic victory
Territorial changes	Gotland is purchased by the Kalmar Union after negotiations in 1407

Belligerents
Kalmar Union; (History of Sweden (800–1521)) Sweden; (Medieval Denmark) Denmark	(State of the Teutonic Order) Teutonic Order; Supported by Visby; Gutes

Commanders and leaders
(Kalmar Union) Margaret I (History of Sweden (800–1521)) Algot Magnuson (History of Sweden (800–1521)) Abraham Brodersson (History of Sweden (800–1521)) Sven Sture	(State of the Teutonic Order) Konrad von Jungingen (State of the Teutonic Order) Ulrich von Jungingen (State of the Teutonic Order) Johann von Thetvytz

Strength
150 at Slite	85 in the beginning, 15,000 later

Casualties and losses
160 ships destroyed or captured	At least 700 killed

The War in Gotland (1403–1404) was a conflict between the Kalmar Union and the Teutonic Order. The war was a failure for Margaret, and the island stayed in Teutonic hands until they eventually sold the island in 1407.

== Background ==
=== Teutonic invasion of Gotland ===
In 1398, with turmoil in Scandinavia, Konrad von Jungingen decided to invade Gotland in an attempt to bring peace to the island in the wake of the conflict between Queen Margaret I and Albert, King of Sweden. The conflict had impacted trade routes in the Southern Baltic Sea due to piracy by the Victual Brothers, who held control over much of the island, which destabilized the region. On April 5, the Vitalians and Mecklenburgs capitulated to the Teutons, the Teutonic troops then took over Gotland, the conquest was legally sanctioned when the Teutonic Order formally purchased the island from Albrecht of Mecklenburg in 1399.

After Margaret I managed to eliminate the last resistance from Mecklenburg, she turned to Teutonic Gotland. In the autumn of 1399 she demands that Konrad von Jungingen, the Grand Master of the Teutonic Order, hand over Gotland to her.

=== Teutonic rule over Gotland ===
The Knights did not have it easy. In addition to fixing damages, they were forced to deal with the main political problem, the distrust between the Gutes and the burghers in Visby. The burghers of Visby took their opportunity and got the Teutonic Order on their side, with the help of the knights, they forcefully moved all trade on Gotland to the ports in Visby. However, Konrad was not oblivious to this, when he realized that this could bring more conflict, he continuously gave evasive and postponing answers to the representatives of the burghers.

The Teutonic rule overall worked well, and they treated the islands people well. The knights took responsibility, they did their best to restore a stable legal society and restore the people's faith in law and order. They were able to effectively drive away the pirates and stopped plundering. At the wall around Visby, they began construction of a new fortification, which later became Visborg. They also had the Gutalagen translated into German, to facilitate the administration of justice. In addition, there are documents showing that the order's high priest, Johan von Techwitz, cooperated with the Gutes country judges in disputes between farmers. The people on Gotland had to however contribute to the cost of the invasion.

=== Prelude to the war ===
In the autumn of 1399 Queen Margarete issued a demand to Konrad von Jungingen to hand over Gotland to her, many letters were exchanged between them and in the end, he did not deny Margaretes right to the island but demanded a repayment of the expenses that the Teutonic Order had on the island. Margarete and the order decided to have a meeting, which occurred in September 1401. Margarete's tone became so threatening that Konrad feared a war on Gotland. However, the negotiations didn't result in much, Margarete then issued an ultimatum to the order, war would be declared if the island was not returned before 11 November 1403.

== War ==
=== 1403 ===
With no agreement being signed before the 11th of November, a Dano-Swedish fleet was sent to Gotland on the 12th of November, the supreme command was given to Abraham Brodersson along with Algot Magnusson Sture, there were additionally 2 old Victual brothers chiefs, Otto von Peckatel and Sven Sture, who had gone into the service of Margaret. When the army landed, the entire island, in exception to Visby which was too strongly fortified and had to be put under siege, was occupied and sacked. Three fortifications were built, of which the one at Slite was the largest and most important. The army also oppressed the peasants in the process.

=== 1404 ===
The Teutonic Order responded to the attack quickly, with Konrad making a quick truce with the Lithuanians to secure his flanks, he summoned the Order and the cities for a counterattack. Meanwhile, the siege of Visby began on 25 January. The city was defended by only 85 Teutonics but the burghers supported them whole-heartedly. When, on the 25th of February the siege army attempts a storm of the city, they were repulsed with heavy casualties and they are forced to lift the siege. On March 2, the Teutonic fleet set sail to Gotland and a week later it arrived, the reinforcements that were under the command of Ulrik von Jungingen was likely upwards of 10,000 men strong. They began a siege on the Dano-Swedish force at Slite, which was defended by 150 men. The fortification resists 3 storm attempts, with the Teutonics losing around 700 men in the process. Because of this, further Teutonic reinforcements are sent to Gotland, which increases the Teutonic army's size to 15,000. The Teutonic army begins an intense barrage on the fortification, After a week of bombardment, the Teutonic force begins to run out of gunpowder, however, the besieged also have problems. They had likely had high casualties during the fighting and begin negotiations on the 16 May. It is decided to have a truce for 3 weeks.

One of the conditions for the truce was that the Dano-Swedish force was to evacuate the "house" in Slite and burn it down. Margarete attempted to help her troops by organizing a large fleet near Kalmar, however, it was ambushed by the Teutonics, over 100 ships were captured and 60 were burned. After this setback, Margarete decided to engage in negotiations with the Teutonics. An armistice was later signed on the 1 July as both parties were tired of war.

== Aftermath ==
During the negotiations, Margarete decided to turn to Albrecht, who was in desperate need of money and was easy to make an agreement with. At a meeting in Flensburg in November 1405 he handed over all his rights to Visby to Margarete in exchange for 8000 marks, which deprived the Teutons of any legitimate reason for being on Gotland. Outraged, Konrad at first refused to surrender the island. However, after an agreement was signed in Helsingborg in 1407, he agreed to cede the island in exchange for 9,000 nobles.
