= Sven Sture =

Nobleman 1360 - 1426

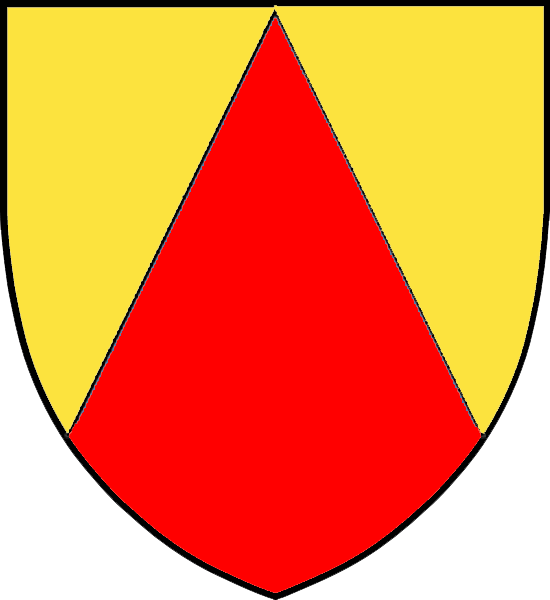
Coat of arms of Sven Sture

Sven Sture (c. 1360 – 1426) was a nobleman from Halland (then part of Denmark), who served as a commander of Queen Margaret of Denmark in Gotland against Mecklenburg. He later switched sides in 1397, allying himself with the Mecklenburgs and becoming one of the leaders of the Victual Brothers, a group of Baltic Sea pirates. Despite his past as a pirate, he eventually regained the trust of Queen Margaret and played a role in the Gotland campaign against the Teutonic Knights.

He was knighted in 1406 and later served as the commander of Sundholm Castle in Småland. Swedish regents Svante Nilsson and Sten Sture the Younger are descendants of Sven Sture.

== Biography ==
=== Early life ===
Sven Sture was likely born around 1360 as the son of the Danish knight Nils Sture (fl. 1377–1392). The Sture family owned estates in Halland, Västergötland and Småland. In the late 1380s, he married Gunilla Matsdotter, with whom he had two children who survived to adulthood: Nils and Katarina.

=== Invasion of Gotland ===
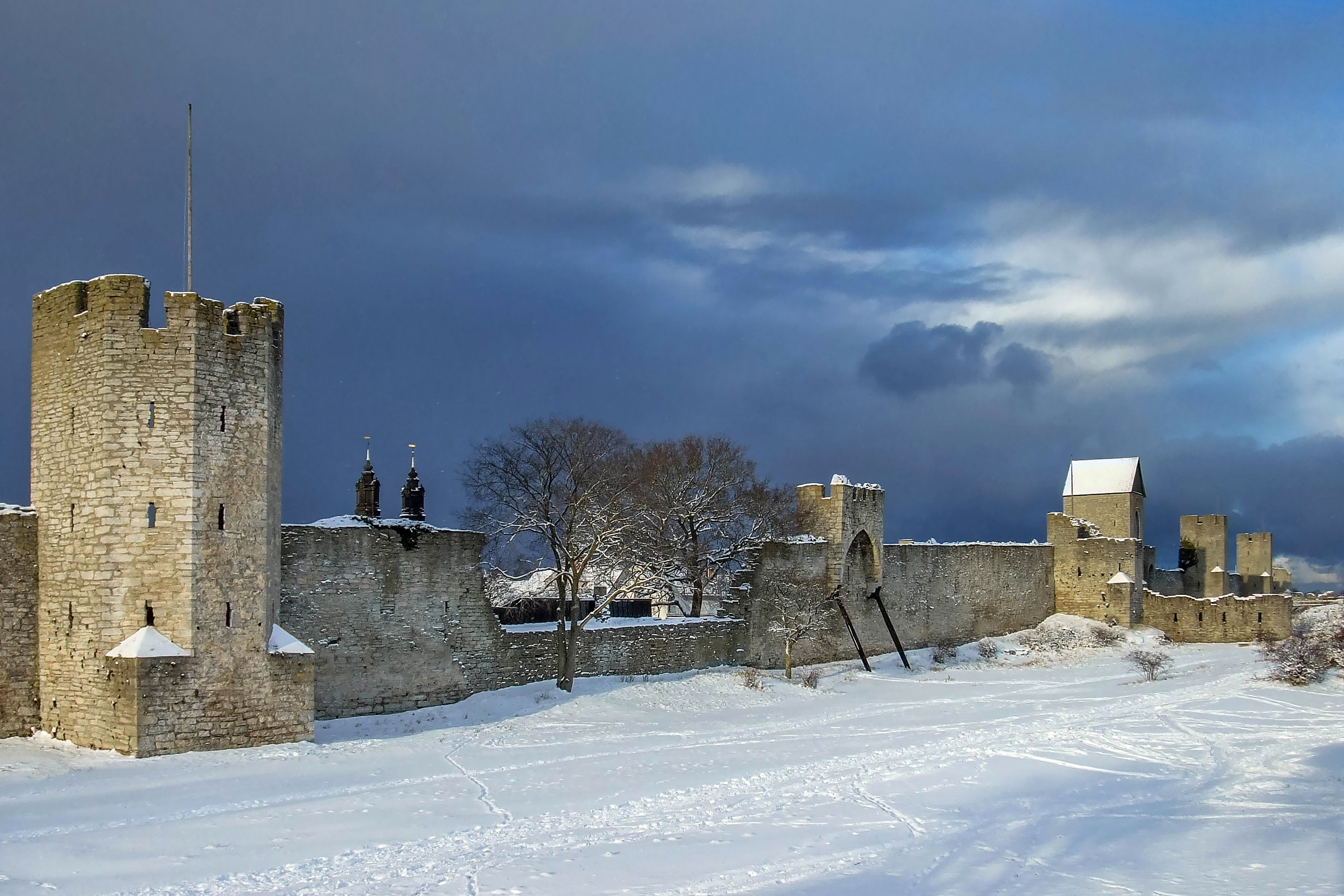
East part of Visby City Wall

In 1389, Queen Margaret defeated and captured Albert of Mecklenburg, King of Sweden, at the Battle of Åsle. However, the Dukes of Mecklenburg still controlled Stockholm, and in 1394, Gotland also fell under their influence, with the Victual Brothers, a group of privateers supported by the Mecklenburgs, using it as a base. In response, Queen Margaret I of Denmark appointed Sven Sture as the commander of her forces in 1395 to reclaim Gotland. Sven Sture successfully gained control of the island's countryside and constructed several fortresses but ultimately failed to capture the city of Visby.

Sven Sture later participated in the peace negotiations between Margaret and the Mecklenburgs at Lindholmen Castle. The final agreement, dated 17 June 1395, stipulated that Albert would be released in exchange for a large ransom, with Stockholm held as collateral. Privateering was to cease immediately, and pirates were to be banned from the ports of Mecklenburg, Stockholm, and Visby. The front lines in Gotland were frozen, with no further fortifications to be built.

=== Leader of the Victual Brothers ===
After the negotiations, Sven Sture remained on mainland before returning to Gotland in 1396. Despite the Lindholmen Treaty, piracy continued to disrupt Baltic Sea trade. During this period, Hanseatic merchants in Lübeck accused Sven Sture of piracy in a letter to Queen Margaret.

In 1396, Margaret's heir, Erik of Pomerania, was crowned ruler of the Kalmar Union. King Albert saw this as a violation of the Lindholmen Treaty, and in late summer 1396, his son, Duke Erik of Mecklenburg, arrived on Gotland to conquer it with Mecklenburgian forces. By November 1396, Duke Erik reported that his position was strong and that he had recaptured parts of the countryside from Sven Sture. Sven surrendered in early 1397 and switched sides, joining Duke Erik's forces.

Under Erik's command, Sven led an expedition against Stockholm during midsummer of the same year, but the city's Hanseatic garrison repelled the attack. After Duke Erik died of the plague in July 1397, his widow, Sophia of Pomerania, appointed Sven as commander of Gotland. He made an agreement with the pirates, allowing them to use Gotland as a base in exchange for half of their loot. Under Sven's leadership, the piracy escalated, targeting both friend and foe indiscriminately.

In 1398, Konrad von Jungingen, the Grand Master of the Teutonic Order, launched a campaign to occupy Gotland, forcing Sven and the Victual Brothers to abandon the island. Sven quickly took control of Gaddaborg, Faxeholm, Korsholm and other strongholds around the Gulf of Bothnia, establishing control over Norrland and Ostrobothnia. However, through the mediation of Algot Magnusson (Sture), he soon made peace with Queen Margaret, surrendering these fortresses in exchange for a pardon.

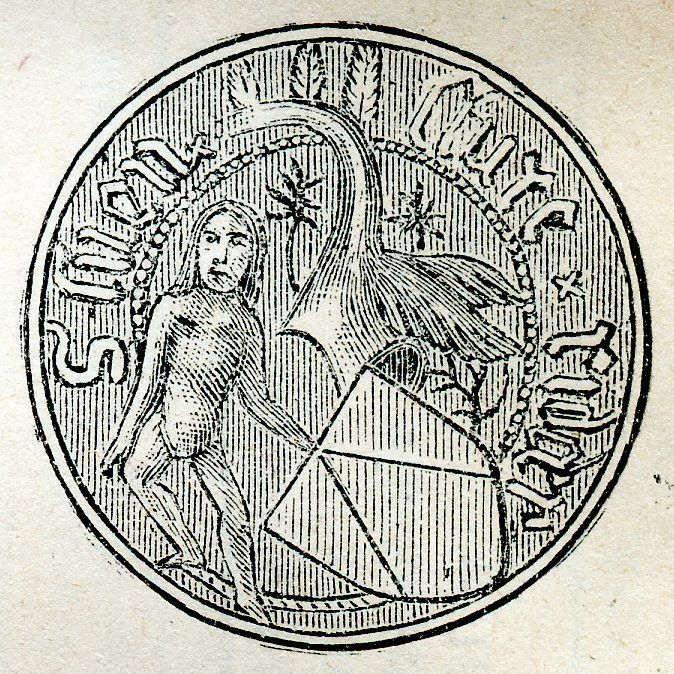
Sven Sture's seal as a knight

=== Later life ===
Despite his past with the Victual Brothers, Sven regained the trust of Queen Margaret and her successor, Erik of Pomerania. From 1403 to 1404, he participated in Algot Magnusson's campaign to reclaim Gotland from the Teutonic Knights.

He was knighted in 1406, and from 1416 until his death, he served as the commander of Sundholm Castle in Småland. He was involved in negotiations with the Holsteiners in Schleswig in 1417. In his later years, he settled peacefully at Eksjöhovgård in Småland.

Sven Sture died in 1426.

== Legacy ==
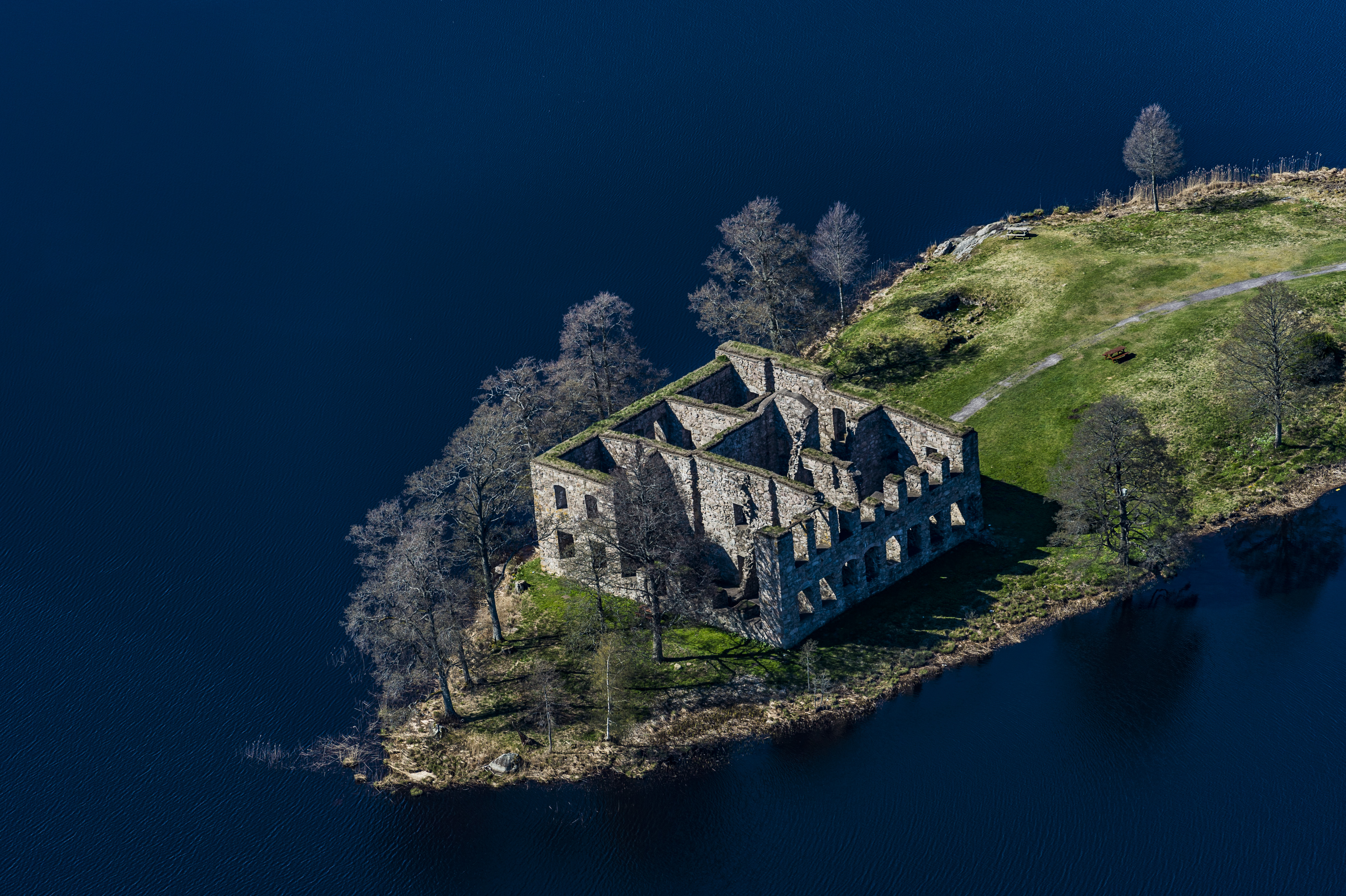
Castle ruin at Eksjö hovgård

Sven's son Nils is recorded as a witness to two loan documents issued in Sundholm in 1416, with Sven acting as the lender. However, Nils seems to have died before his father, without leaving any heirs. Consequently, the Danish Sture line ended with Sven.

His daughter, Katarina, married Bo Stensson of the Natt och Dag family. After Sven Sture's death, the castle at Ekesjö was inherited first by his son-in-law Bo Stensson. The castle later passed to Bo's son, Nils, who rose to the position of riksråd, and adopted his grandfather's surname, styling himself Nils Bosson Sture. Despite this, he nevertheless continued to use the Natt och Dag arms of his father. As a result, the Younger Sture Family is usually regarded as a branch of the Natt och Dag family rather than a direct continuation of the Danish Sture line. Swedish regents Svante Sture and Sten Sture the Younger are descendants of Sven Sture.
