= Albert of Mecklenburg =

Albert of Mecklenburg German: Albrecht von Mecklenburg may refer to:

- Albert I, Duke of Mecklenburg-Stargard (bef. 1377–1397)
- Albert II, Duke of Mecklenburg (1318–1379)
- Albert III, Duke of Mecklenburg, better known as Albert, King of Sweden (1338–1412)
- Albert IV, Duke of Mecklenburg (bef. 1363–1388)
- Albert V, Duke of Mecklenburg (1397–1423)
- Albert VI, Duke of Mecklenburg (1438–bef.1483)
- Albrecht VII, Duke of Mecklenburg (1486–1547)
- Albert VIII, Duke of Mecklenburg, better known as Albrecht von Wallenstein (1583–1634)
- John Albert I, Duke of Mecklenburg (1525–1576)
- John Albert II, Duke of Mecklenburg (1590–1636)
- Duke John Albert of Mecklenburg (1857–1920)
