= Margareta Dume =

Swedish heiress

Margareta Lambrektsdotter Dume, often referred to as Greta Dume, (d. 1410), was a Swedish heiress. She played a political role in the struggle between Albert, King of Sweden and Queen Margaret I of Denmark over the Swedish throne in the late 14th century.

Margareta Dume belonged to an originally German noble family who lived in Swedish Finland since 1362. In 1373, she married the powerful Bo Jonsson (Grip), and he gave important posts to her five brothers Klaus, Gerhard, Henneke, Volrad and Berthol. In 1386, she became a widow. In the will of her late spouse, she had been denied the larger part of his vast fortune and any influence upon his affairs. She contested this, left for the Swedish royal court and made the King the protector of her and her children's rights in the civil war-like conflict which erupted over the inheritance of her spouse in 1387. She also declared her support of King Albert as his ally and loyalist in his struggle against Queen Margaret. This made it possible for her to use the King's supporters in the great inheritance feud. It is noted that she had an important political position, as she exerted influence upon certain affairs of state due to her important support to the King: in 1388, for example, the King granted a member of the nobility the return of his confiscated property upon her request. She was present at the Swedish court in 1389, the same year Albert was deposed, but left for Germany after this. In 1394, she married the Swedish noble Bengt Niklisson, returned to Sweden with him and made her peace with Queen Margaret.
