= Erik, Duke of Mecklenburg =

Son of Albert, King of Sweden

- Born: possibly in 1367 or 1368
- Died: 26 July 1397; Klintehamn south of Visby
- Noble family: House of Mecklenburg
- Spouse: Sophie of Pomerania-Wolgast
- Father: Albert, King of Sweden
- Mother: Richardis of Schwerin

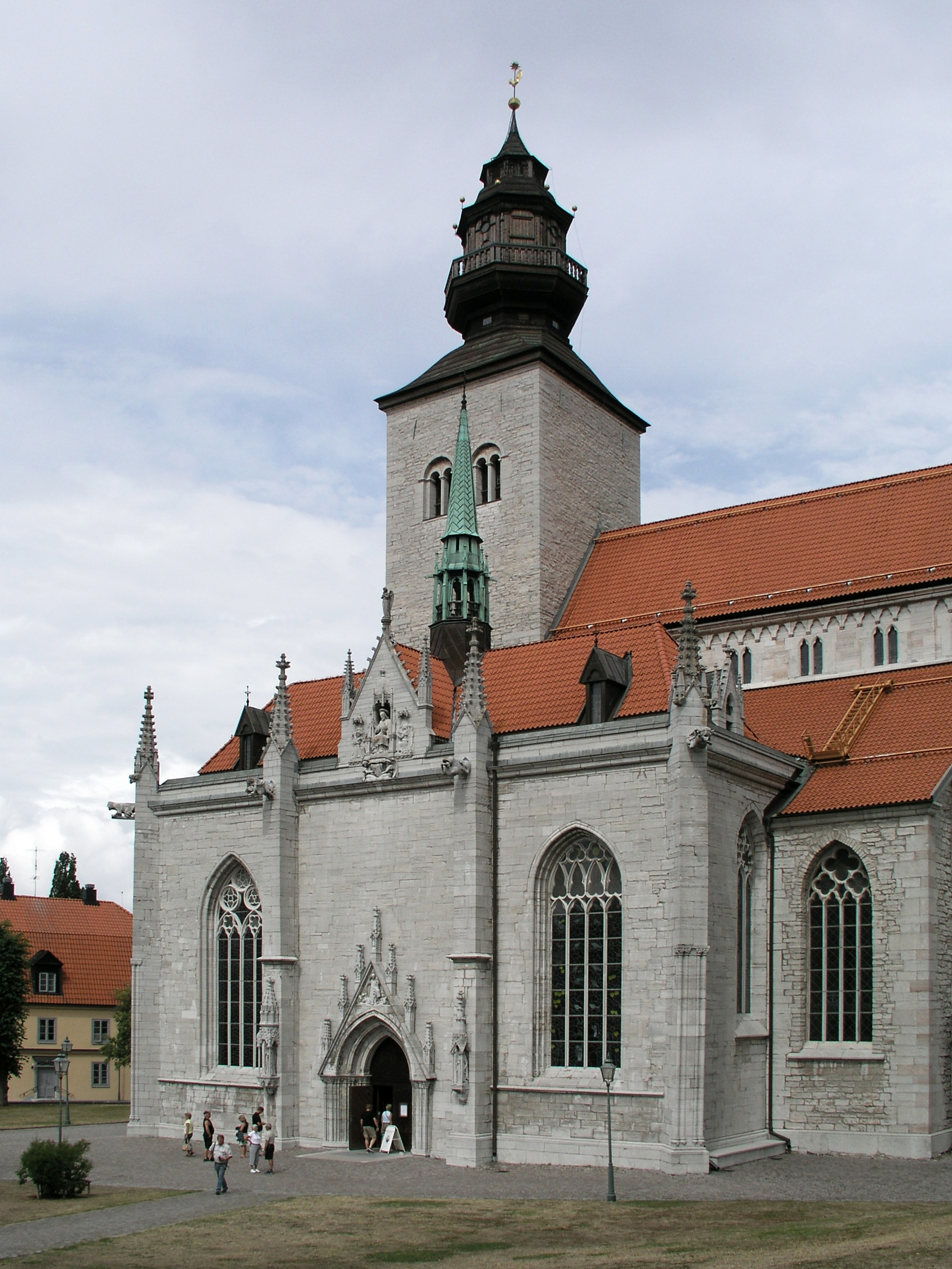
Erik was buried in Visby Cathedral.

Erik, Duke of Mecklenburg (c. 1367/1368 – 26 July 1397) was the eldest son and heir apparent of Albert, King of Sweden. Erik played a significant role in his father's attempts to secure and reclaim the Swedish throne. Erik and Albert were defeated in battle of Åsle in 1389 and imprisoned by Queen Margaret I of Denmark. They were released in 1395 against a ransom guaranteed by the Hanseatic League.

Albert tried to regain the Swedish crown by sending Erik to conquer Gotland in 1396. Erik briefly became the ruler of Gotland. His death in 1397 led to the loss of Gotland from Mecklenburg to pirates, who were later conquered by the Teutonic Order.

== Early life ==
Erik was the eldest son of Albert, King of Sweden (r. 1364–1389), and Queen Richardis, daughter of Count Otto I of Schwerin. The date and place of their marriage are unknown, but it likely took place in Sweden after 1364. This is inferred from a contemporary genealogy that records Albert's betrothal and succession to the throne in 1364 but does not mention the marriage, suggesting it had not yet occurred.

Erik's year of birth is unknown. He was likely born in Sweden, where he spent his childhood and youth. A treaty between King Valdemar Atterdag of Denmark and King Albert was signed on July 28, 1366. The treaty guaranteed the succession of the Swedish throne to the other sons of Duke Albert the Elder in case King Albert died without an issue, but does not mention Erik, who had probably not been born at the time. Viljo Nordman speculates that Erik was of legal age, eighteen, in 1385–1386, when he first appears in documents, placing his birth to 1367–1368. His mother Richardis died in 1377 in Stockholm.

Erik was possibly named after his great-grandfather, Duke Erik Magnusson. The name Erik did not occur within the ducal house of Mecklenburg, but was common among Swedish kings, suggesting that he was intended to follow in his father's footsteps and inherit the Swedish throne.

== Preparations for war ==
Erik's father, Albert, attempted to consolidate his position as King of Sweden in 1386. Contemporary sources first mention Erik as his father's companion during a trip to Mecklenburg in 1385–86. In late 1386 or early 1387, Albert sent Erik on a mission to the Teutonic State, during which Erik also spent some time in Danzig. While Albert remained in Mecklenburg to gather troops, Erik returned to Sweden, where he, along with his cousin Duke John IV of Mecklenburg, governed in his father's absence.

== Imprisonment and release ==
In 1389, Queen Margaret I of Denmark defeated Albert in the battle of Åsle, on the plains of Falköping in Västergötland. The castles in Sweden surrendered to Margaret, making her the ruler of the three Scandinavian kingdoms. After the battle, both Erik and Albert were captured and imprisoned in Denmark for more than six years. They were initially kept in Helsingborg Castle and later transferred to Lindholmen Castle in southwestern Skåne. In Sweden, only Stockholm remained under Mecklenburg control, but even it was besieged by Margaret's troops.

To support Stockholm from the sea, the dukes of Mecklenburg employed a company of privateers known as Vitalienbrüder ('Victual brothers'). In 1391, the Mecklenburgs conquered Bornholm and Visby. The pirates obtained bases in Gotland and Finland and disrupted trade in the Baltic Sea. The Hansa started negotiations with Margaret in order restore their commercial rights in Baltic.

In 1395, Albert and Erik were released against a large ransom after three years of negotiations involving Hinrich Westhof and Johann Niebur, the mayors of Lübeck. Stockholm was given as a pledge to the Hanseatic cities that guaranteed the ransom. If the ransom was not paid within three years, Stockholm would be given to Margaret.

After his release, Albert returned to Mecklenburg with his son and resumed his duties as the duke. On February 10-15 in 1396, a double wedding took place in Schwerin. Albert married the twice widowed Agnes of Brunswick-Lüneburg and Erik married Sophie, the daughter of Duke Bogislaw VI of Pomerania-Wolgast. Erik's and Sophie's marriage produced no children.

== Master of Gotland ==
Albert could not raise the money for the ransom and attempted to reconquer his kingdom. In 1396, he tasked Erik with the reconquest of Gotland. In the summer or fall of 1396, Erik landed on the island with an army and began to build fortifications. Sven Sture had also arrived to the island with Danish troops. In the spring of 1397, with the help of Victual Brothers, Erik defeated Sven Sture, who was forced to change sides and swear allegiance to Albert III. After Sven Sture's defeat, Erik was the master of Gotland. Due to his association with the Victual Brothers and Sven Sture's men, he is sometimes portrayed as a pirate chieftain.

In June 1397 Erik, accompanied by Sven Sture's men, launched a failed surprise attack against Stockholm, now controlled by the Hanseatic league. Around the same time, the kingdoms of Denmark, Norway and Sweden were united into the Kalmar Union, which cemented the position of Queen Margaret and crushed Mecklenburg's hopes of regaining the Swedish crown.

== Death and burial ==
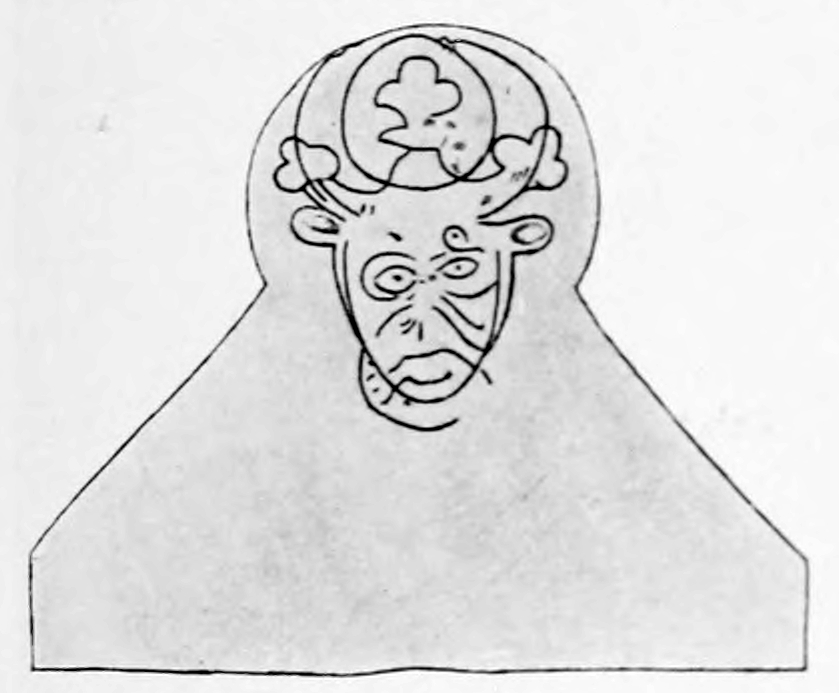
Tracing of the Mecklenburg coat of arms from Erik's tomb

In 1397, Duke Erik suddenly died of an illness at his fortress, called Landeskrone or Klinteholm, located close to the port of Klintehamn, south of Visby in Gotland. He was buried at St. Mary's Church (Visby Cathedral), where part of his original tomb is on display. Notably, he was not buried in a prestigious place within the choir of the church, but was instead buried in the churchyard. According to German historian Nikolaus Marschalk (d. 1525), this was because he died of plague. However, there are no records of a plague outbreak at that time.

After Erik's death, the dukes of Mecklenburg lost control of the island to the pirates, and had to withdraw from the island in April 1398 with Erik's widow Sophie and 400 men. The fortress of Landeskrona was destroyed in 1398 when the Teutonic Order and the leading Prussian cities conquered the island to put an end to piracy.

== See also ==
- War in Gotland (1398) – Teutonic invasion of Gotland
