= Euphemia of Sweden =

- Duchess consort of Mecklenburg
- Coat of arms of the House of Bjälbo
- Born: c. 1317
- Died: before 16 June 1370
- Spouse: Albert II, Duke of Mecklenburg
- Issue: Henry III, Duke of Mecklenburg; Albert, King of Sweden; Magnus I, Duke of Mecklenburg; Ingeborg, Duchess of Bavaria and Countess of Holstein-Rendsburg; Anna of Mecklenburg
- House: Bjälbo
- Father: Erik Magnusson
- Mother: Ingeborg of Norway

Euphemia of Sweden (Swedish: Eufemia Eriksdotter; c. 1317 – after 27 October 1363 and before 16 June 1370) was a Swedish princess and Duchess consort of Mecklenburg through her marriage to Albert II, Duke of Mecklenburg. She was the daughter of Eric, Duke of Södermanland, and Ingeborg of Norway, and the sister of King Magnus IV of Sweden. Her son Albert became king of Sweden in 1364.

== Biography ==
=== Early life ===
Euphemia was born around 1317, the daughter of Duke Erik Magnusson (c. 1282–1318), the second son of King Magnus Ladulås of Sweden, and Princess Ingeborg of Norway (1301–1361), the only legitimate daughter of King Haakon V of Norway. Ingeborg had been her father's only legitimate heir before the birth of her son Magnus in 1316, who became heir to the Norwegian throne.

In 1319, her infant elder brother Magnus Eriksson (1316–1374) succeeded their maternal grandfather to the throne of Norway. That same year, Swedish nobles exiled their uncle, King Birger of Sweden, and the infant Magnus was subsequently elected King of Sweden, thereby uniting Sweden and Norway in a personal union. Their mother Ingeborg had a seat in the guardian government as well as the position of an independent ruler of her own fiefs, and played an important part during their childhood and adolescence.

The 24 July 1321 marriage contract for Euphemia was signed at Bohus in her mother's fief in Bohuslän. Her mother had plans to take control over Danish Scania, next to her duchy. The marriage was arranged with the terms that Mecklenburg, Saxony, Holstein, Rendsburg and Schleswig would assist Ingeborg in the conquest of Scania. This was approved by the council of Norway but not Sweden. When Ingeborg's forces under command of Knut Porse of Varberg, invaded Scania in 1322–23, Mecklenburg betrayed her and the alliance was broken. Eventually, the affair of Euphemia's marriage led to a conflict between Ingeborg and the governments of Sweden and Norway, which led to the demise of Ingeborg's political position in the guardian governments. The marriage took place anyway, after a fifteen-year engagement. Euphemia did not lack influence in Sweden. She is known to have acted as the witness of seals in several documents. In 1335, when King Magnus appointed Nils Abjörnsson (Sparre av Tofta) to drots, the condition that Euphemia would act as his adviser was included in his appointment.

=== Duchess of Mecklenburg ===
Euphemia was married in Rostock on April 10, 1336, to her distant kinsman, Albert II, Duke of Mecklenburg (1318 – 2 February 1379), a North-German lord deeply interested in obtaining some power in Scandinavia. Later the same year, the couple returned to Sweden with Rudolf of Saxony and Henry of Holstein to be present at the coronation of her brother and sister-in-law Blanche of Namur. In Germany, Euphemia's life as a Duchess consort of Mecklenburg does not appear to have affected her status in Sweden, as she was still a political factor there and her name was still placed on various documents. She was the mistress of a very expensive ducal court. In 1340–41, she convinced Magnus to grant renewed trading privileges in Norway to the Hanseatic cities of Mecklenburg, Rostock and Wismar. On 15 April 1357, she granted her the estates Hammar and Farthses to Skänninge Abbey following the deaths of her half-brothers Haakon and Canute in 1350. She was last confirmed alive 27 October 1363, when she gave up the ownership of her dower estate in Mecklenburg. Her death year is not known, but she is confirmed dead 16 June 1370, when her widower made a vicaria to her memory. Euphemia lived to see her own second son depose her brother from the Swedish throne, and ascend as King Albert of Sweden in 1364.

== Issue ==
At the time of her death, she had five surviving children:

- Henry III (c. 1337 – 1383), Duke of Mecklenburg from 1379 until his death.
- Albert (1340–1412), King of Sweden from 1364 to 1389 and Duke of Mecklenburg-Schwerin from 1384 to 1412
- Magnus I (d. 1385), Duke of Mecklenburg from 1383 until his death
- Ingeborg (died c. 1395); married, firstly, Louis VI the Roman, Duke of Bavaria (1330–1365); Married secondly, Henry II, Count of Holstein-Rendsburg (c. 1317 – 1384)

== Other sources ==
- Nordberg, Michael (1995). I kung Magnus tid. Norstedts. ISBN 9119521227.
- Eufemia Eriksdotter, urn:sbl:15533, Svenskt biografiskt lexikon (art av Allan Mohlin. Art. stilistiskt bearbetad av redaktionen.), hämtad 2013-10-24.
- Åke Ohlmarks (1973) Alla Sveriges drottningar (Stockholm : Geber) ISBN 9120040105
