= Magnus I =

Magnus I may refer to:

- Magnus the Good (1024–1047), King of Norway and King of Denmark
- Magnus Erlendsson, Earl of Orkney (ruled from 1108 to about 1115)
- Magnus the Strong, King of Sweden (c. 1106–1134)
- Magnus Ladulås, King of Sweden (1240–1290)
- Magnus, Duke of Saxony (c. 1045–1106)
- Magnus I, Duke of Saxe-Lauenburg from the Ascanian House (1470–1543)
- Magnus I, Duke of Mecklenburg
- Magnus, Duke of Östergötland, prince of Sweden (1542–1595)
