= Abraham Brodersson =

Scandinavian statesman and military commander

- Knight
- Died: 27 August 1410; Near the Sønderborg Castle
- Cause of death: Execution by King Erik of Pomerania
- Offices: Lord Lieutenant of Northern Halland, Castellan of the Kalmar Castle

Abraham Brodersson (ca. 1350 – 27 August 1410) was a Scandinavian statesman and military commander who lived in the 14th and early 15th century.

He was a very able military leader and trusted advisor who contributed greatly to the rise of Queen Margaret I of Denmark, although initially he might have been introduced to the Queen and raised in her favours due to his handsome appearance. He is reported to have had a daughter with Margaret.

== Biography ==
As a member of one of the richest and most powerful families in Scandinavia, the Baad family from Halland, he joined the pro-Margaret party in Sweden and helped her to depose Albert of Mecklenburg. He then supported Margaret in uniting the three crowns of Scandinavia and designating as her heir Eric of Pomerania.

He led Margaret's land forces and fleet together with Algot Magnusson in sieges of Stockholm during 1393-1394. He also participated in the campaign against the Island of Gothland a decade later.

On Trinity Sunday, 17 July 1397, Margaret caused her grand nephew Eric to be crowned, and on the same day conferred knighthood on 133 people, among them Abraham Brodersson. An old chronicle recounts that "Amidst all the fine folk present, none shone in manly beauty and bravery of apparel like Abraham Broderson ... Abraham was always present in her mind." From 1403 to 1405 he was the castellan of the Kalmar Castle. He was also District Councillor of Halland, Värend and Finnveden. He became powerfully favored by her, and about him the people sang a lay "The whole forest is full of Abraham."

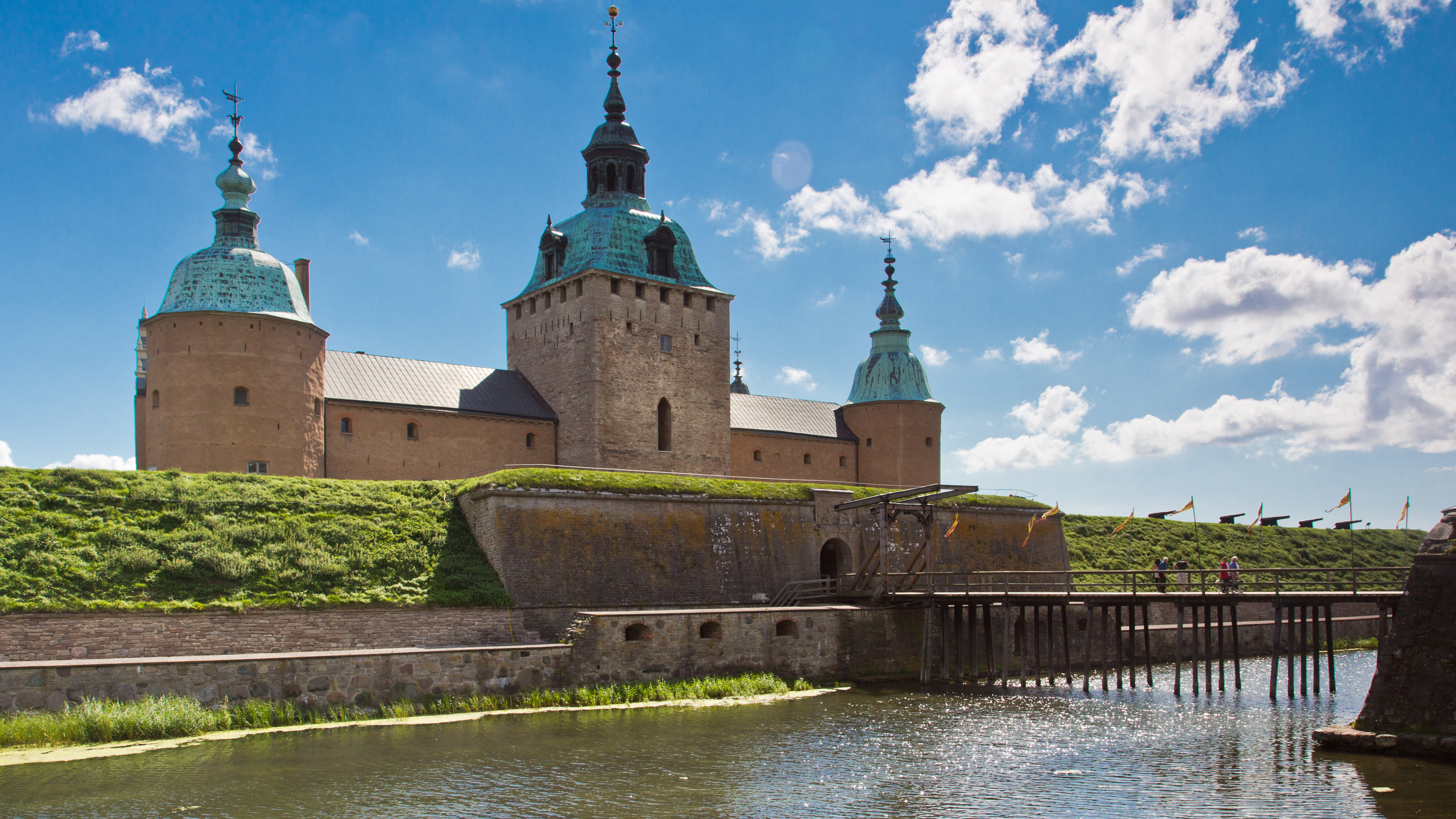
Front view of the Kalmar Castle, where Abraham Brodersson lived and of which he was the castellan

He was one of the largest and richest landowners in the Kalmar Union, with much property in Småland, Västergötland and Denmark. In Sweden, he had more servants than the king . According to Ahlbäck and Helle, as the castellan of the Kalmar Castle (a powerful office), he was notorious for levying heavy taxes, and he abused Margaret's trust in unashamedly acquiring lands from widows and petty nobility, possibly amassing some 500 holdings. He became the owner of a lot of property through his first wife Margareta as well. The total number of farms Abraham owned might be more than 600.

In 1410, Queen Margaret appointed her nephew, King Erik of Pomerania, as the commander-in-chief in a campaign against Holstein. Based on abilities and experience, Abraham Brodersson should have been made the commander, but Margaret wanted to use this opportunity to reform and train her heir, who had been a disappointment to her. Thus, Abraham Brodersson was given a battalion, while the campaign was led by an untested and untried Eric to disastrous results. Resentful of Abraham Brodersson's presence and his power, after a failed siege against the Sønderborg Castle, Eric blamed his defeat on Abraham Brodersson, (possibly falsely) accused him of raping a woman and had him executed by sword, unknown to Margaret. According to Louis Gabriel Michaud, by this time, Abraham Brodersson had become so powerful and was held by the queen in such high regard that he became a rival who threatened Eric's throne.

Abraham Brodersson has been praised for his bravery and military skills in such documents as the Rhyme chronicles, but also has a reputation for greed, brutality and dissolute life. Margaret lamented the death of her favourite knight greatly (although, the patient Queen again forgave Eric for this act of treachery) and caused an altar for him to be raised in the Cathedral of Lund, where masses for him and herself would be held conjointly, and did not long survive him. The two years between his death and her own death were marked with great turbulence in Denmark, where people were heavily taxed to support the war Eric was waging. The Queen though tried to keep her composure, took it upon herself to direct the Holstein-Schleswig war and was bringing it to a promising conclusion by diplomatic means when she suddenly died (some authors speculate that Abraham's death might have contributed to it, leaving the war to Eric who made a disastrous situation out of it again.

== Marriages and descendants ==
He married Margareta Petersdotter Dudde in 1382. The couple had one child named Birgitta (Brita). The girl's biological mother is suspected to be Queen Margaret. Brita accompanied Queen Margaret to Vadstena where the fair young child, who apparently bore great resemblance to the Queen and certified by Margaret as having royal blood, was educated in a convent. Later, Brita married Thure Bjelke and gave birth to the first wife of King Charles VIII of Sweden and thus was the ancestress of Christina Gyllenstierna. After his first wife's death, he married Cecilia Nilsdotter Jaernskaegg. He reportedly had many children born out of wedlock.

== See also ==
- Margaret I of Denmark
- Erik of Pomerania
- Broder Svensson

== Bibliography ==
- Higgins, Sophia Elizabeth (1885). Women of Europe in the fifteenth and sixteenth centuries, Volume 1. Oxford University: Hurst and Blackett. p. 67. "Abraham Brodersson treachery."
- Smollett, Tobias George (1762). The Critical Review, Or, Annals of Literature, Volume 12. W. Simpkin and R. Marshall. p. 170.
- S. tunberg. "Abraham Brodersson". riksarkivet.
- Gissel, Svend (1981). Desertion and Land Colonization in the Nordic Countries C. 1300-1600: Comparative Report from the Scandinavian Research Project on Deserted Farms and Villages. Almqvist & Wiksell International. p. 198. ISBN 9789122004318.
- White, Richard (2010). These Stones Bear Witness. AuthorHouse. p. 210. ISBN 9781452017198.
- Kalmar läns museum. "Abraham Brodersson Tjurhuvud". Kalmar läns museum.
- Fryxell, Anders; von Schoultz, Anne; Botham Howitt, Mary (1844). The History of Sweden, Volume 1. R. Bentley. p. 296.
- Geijer, Erik Gustaf (1845). The History of the Swedes. Whittaker. p. 62.
- Edwards, Amelia D. (1859). The English Woman's Journal, Volume 3. English Woman's Journal Company. p. 92.
- Etting, Vivian (2009), Margrete den første, Nordisk Forlag A/S, ISBN 978-87-02-07177-1
