= Richardis of Schwerin, Queen of Sweden =

Queen of Sweden from 1365 to 1377

Richardis of Schwerin
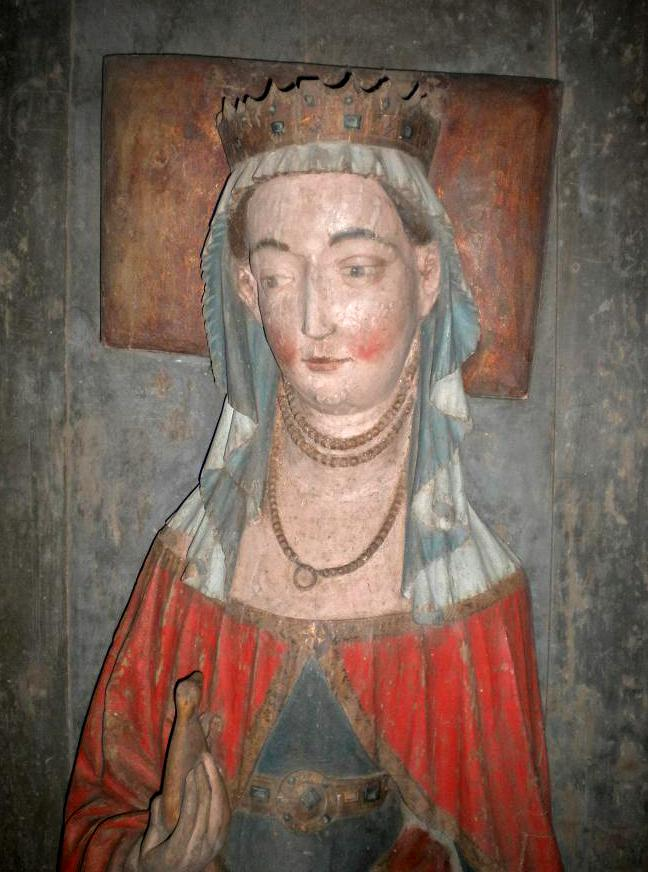
- Queen Richardis as sculpted on Albert's grave

Queen consort of Sweden
- Tenure: 1365–1377
- Born: c. 1347; Schwerin?
- Died: 23 April/11 July 1377 (aged 29–30); Stockholm
- Burial: Stockholm Dominican Church
- Spouse: Albert, King of Sweden
- Issue: Eric I, Duke of Mecklenburg; Richardis Catherine, Duchess of Görlitz
- House: House of Hagen
- Father: Otto I, Count of Schwerin
- Mother: Matilda of Mecklenburg-Werle

Richardis of Schwerin (Swedish: Rikardis; 1347 – April 23 or July 11, 1377) was Queen of Sweden as the consort of King Albert.

== Life ==
Richardis was the child of Otto I, Count of Schwerin (d. 1357) and Matilda of Mecklenburg-Werle (d. 1361) and the paternal niece of Richardis of Schwerin, Duchess of Schleswig, the wife of the former Valdemar III of Denmark. She was engaged to Albert of Mecklenburg, who was also to be king of Sweden.

In Wismar on 12 October 1352, the marriage contract was signed. It was not until 1365, however, that they were married in person and Richardis arrived in Sweden. She died in Stockholm and was buried in the Cloister Church at the Black Friars' Monastery.

== Children ==
- Eric I, Duke of Mecklenburg (1365–1397); also called Duke Eric, heir to the throne of Sweden and Lord of Gotland.
- Richardis Catherine of Sweden (1370/1372-1400); married John of Görlitz

Richardis of Schwerin, Queen of Sweden House of Hagen Born: circa 1347 Died: 23 April/11 July 1377
Vacant Title last held by Margaret I of Denmark	Queen consort of Sweden; 1365–1377	Vacant Title next held by Philippa of England
