= Ingeborg of Mecklenburg =

- Electress consort of Brandenburg; Countess of Holstein-Rendsburg
- Born: 1343/45
- Died: 25 July 1395 (aged 51–52)
- Spouse: Louis VI of Bavaria; Henry II, Count of Holstein-Rendsburg
- Issue: Gerhard VI, Count of Holstein; Albert II, Count of Holstein-Rendsburg; Henry III, Count of Schauenburg-Holstein; Sophia, Duchess of Pomerania
- House: Mecklenburg (by birth); Wittelsbach (by first marriage); Schauenburg (by second marriage)
- Father: Albert II, Duke of Mecklenburg
- Mother: Euphemia of Sweden

Ingeborg of Mecklenburg (1343/45 – 25 July 1395) was a daughter of Albert II, Duke of Mecklenburg, and Euphemia of Sweden. Through her mother, she was a great-granddaughter of King Haakon V of Norway and a great-granddaughter of King Magnus Ladulås of Sweden.

In 1360, she married Louis VI "the Roman" of Bavaria, becoming his second wife. The marriage was childless.

After Louis's death, she married Henry II, Count of Holstein-Rendsburg. They had at least four children:

- Gerhard VI, Count of Holstein; married Catherine Elisabeth of Brunswick-Lüneburg in 1391 and had issue
- Albert II, Count of Holstein-Rendsburg
- Henry III, Count of Schauenburg-Holstein (died 1421), Prince-Bishop of Osnabrück as Henry I
- Sophia of Holstein (1375, Lübeck – 1448); married Bogislaw VIII, Duke of Pomerania (1364–1418) in 1398 and had issue

Ingeborg of Mecklenburg House of Mecklenburg Born: 1343 Died: 25 July 1395
German royalty
Preceded by Cunigunde of Poland	Electress consort of Brandenburg; 15 February 1360–17 May 1365	Succeeded by Catherine of Bohemia
