= Henry II of Holstein-Rendsburg =

Count of Holstein-Rendsburg (c. 1317–c. 1384)

Henry II
- Count of Holstein-Rendsburg
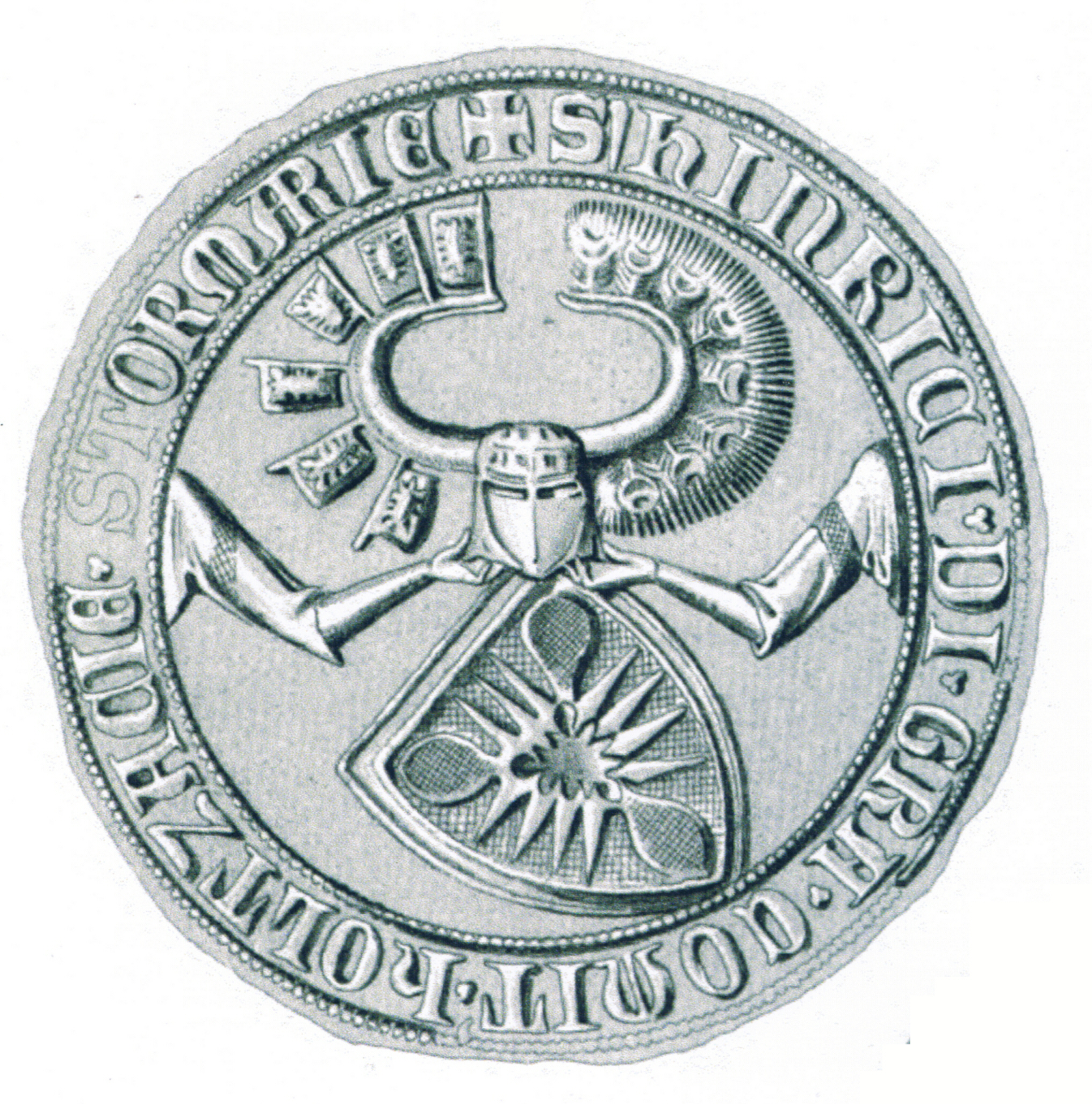
- Seal of Henry II, dating from about 1343
- Born: c. 1317
- Died: c. 1384
- Noble family: Schauenburg
- Spouses: Matilda of Lippe; Ingeborg of Mecklenburg-Schwerin
- Issue: Gerhard VI, Count of Holstein; Albert II, Count of Holstein-Rendsburg; Henry III, Count of Schauenburg-Holstein; Sophia, Duchess of Pomerania
- Father: Gerhard III, Count of Holstein-Rendsburg
- Mother: Sophia of Werle

Count Henry II of Holstein-Rendsburg (nickname Iron Henry; c. 1317 – c. 1384) was count of Holstein-Rendsburg and pledge lord of Southern Schleswig. He ruled jointly with his younger brother, Count Nicholas (d. 1397).

== Life ==
Henry was the elder son of Count Gerhard III and Sophia of Werle. Henry was a major European player as a mercenary leader and a typical representative of the late medieval knighthood. He fought in Italy, Russia, Estonia and France. He served in the English and Swedish armies. In 1367, he was commander of a fleet of the Hanseatic League and in 1368, he conquered Copenhagen. Count Henry II and his brother Nicholas vigorously defended their claims in Holstein and Schleswig, against Denmark and against the Frisians.

== Marriage and issue ==
Henry was married twice:

1. Matilda (d. 1365), the daughter of Bernard V, Lord of Lippe. They had one daughter:
  1. Matilda (documented on March 12, 1365)
2. 1366 Ingeborg (d. 25 Jul 1395), daughter of Albert II, Duke of Mecklenburg-Schwerin. They had four children:
  - Gerhard VI
  - Albert II
  - Henry III (d. 1421), Prince-Bishop of Osnabrück as Henry I
  - Sophia of Holstein (born: 1375 in Lübeck), married Bogislaw VIII of Pomerania-Stargard

== Seal ==
His seal had the inscription: S (IGILLUM) * HINRICI * D (E) I * GRA (TIA) * COMIT (IS) * HOLTZACIE * STORM ARIA (Seal of Henry, by the grace of God, Count of Holstein (and) Stormarn)

== Footnotes ==
Henry II of Holstein-Rendsburg House of Schauenburg Born: c. 1317 Died: c. 1384
German nobility
Preceded by Gerhard III	Count of Holstein-Rendsburg as Henry II; 1340-1381/1384 with his brother Nicholas (1340-1397)	Succeeded by Nicholas, Albert II and Gerhard VI
Danish nobility
Preceded by Henry I	Duke of Schleswig as Henry II; 1375-1381/1384 with his brother Nicholas (1375-1386)	Succeeded by Nicholas
