= Battle of Åsle =

1389 battle between Danish and Swedish forces

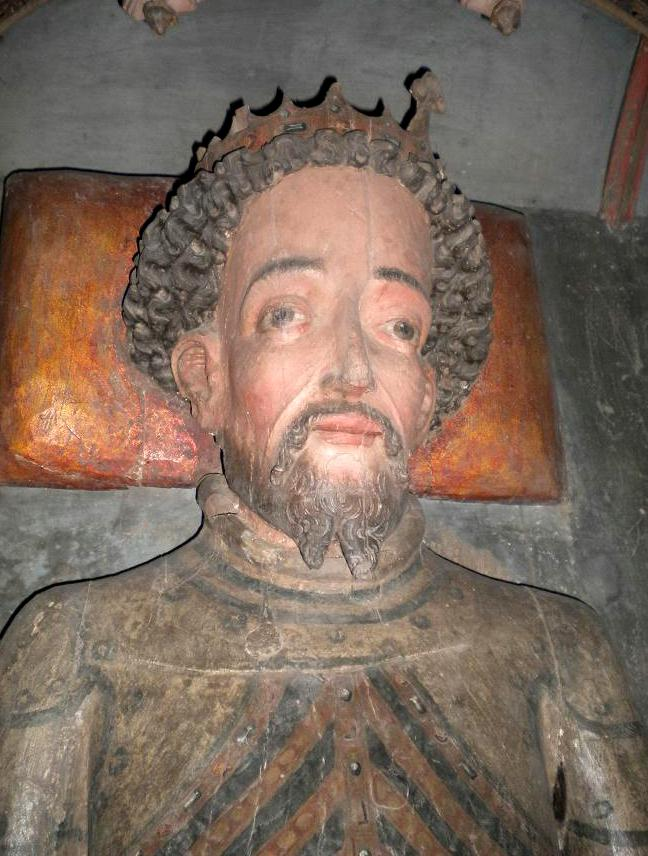
- Portrait detail of the contemporary grave monument of Albert of Mecklenburg in Doberan Minster
Date	24 February 1389
Location	Åsle, Sweden
Result	Danish victory
Territorial changes	Margaret I becomes regent of Sweden

Belligerents
Denmark; Pro-Danish Swedes	Sweden; German mercenaries

Commanders and leaders
Margaret I Henrik Parow	Albert of Mecklenburg (POW) Erik of Mecklenburg (POW); Gert Snakenborg

Strength
1,500	1,000

Casualties and losses
8 knights killed	20 knights killed

The Battle of Åsle was the decisive battle between King Albert of Mecklenburg's and Queen Margaret Valdemarsdotter's forces in 1389. The battle took place at Åsle church village about one Swedish mile (10 km) east of Falköping. Margaret was victorious and took Albert and his son Erik as prisoners of war. They were released in 1395 against a large ransom.

== Background ==
On March 22, 1388, Margareta was appointed regent in Sweden. However, King Albert received support from the burgers of Stockholm and in late summer went to Germany to recruit troops. During the year, Margaret's Swedish troops began a siege of Axevalla House, located between Skara and Skövde, held by German mercenaries. Margaret's main force eventually withdrew, leaving behind a smaller siege force under Nils Svarte Skåning to starve out the fortress's defenders. King Albert returned to Sweden at the turn of the year 1388–1389. In Germany, King Albert had gathered troops accustomed to war and mounted, possibly a thousand men. The landing probably took place in Kalmar and with his troops, King Albert captured Rumlaborg outside Jönköping. Once at Axevalla House, the king learned that a Danish force consisting of 1,500 men under the leadership of the Mecklenburger Henrik Parow had marched up Nissastigen.

== Battle ==
On February 24, 1389, the forces met between Mösseberg and a swamp, at Åsle church village about one Swedish mile east of Falköping. There is no more detailed description of what happened during the battle. Queen Margaret's forces were victorious despite their commander Henrik Parow falling in the battle. By tradition, King Albrecht's loss is usually attributed to the German horsemen's horses sinking and getting stuck in the shallow ground. It is also claimed that Margaret's troops were led by Erik Kettilsson Puke instead of Henrik Parow. According to the medieval historian Lars-Olof Larsson these claims are fabrications.

The Lübeck chronicler Detmar describes the battle:

The king was so eager for battle and in such a hurry that not all of his people had time to prepare themselves. When it came to battle, he won the first engagement and tore up two army divisions under two banners. But his success did not last long. The king lost the battle with all the lords and knights who took part in the battle except those who fled. In particular, one named Gert Snakeburg, whose first knight's day it was, escaped. He took 60 knights with him who all fled and that was the main reason why the battle was lost.

== Aftermath ==
When Margaret received news of the battle, she was in Varberg and ordered the prisoners of war to be taken to Bohus Fortress, where she herself went. The bishop of Skara was released, other prisoners of war had to pay to be released. King Albert and his son Erik were imprisoned until 1395 when they were released after signing the Lindholmstrakatuta.

== Sources ==
- Hagen, Ellen (1953). Margareta – Nordens drottning. Stockholm: Saxon & Lindströms förlag. LIBRIS: 1452182.
- Lars-Olof Larsson (historian) (1997). Kalmarunionens tid (andra upplagan ed.). Stockholm: Bokförlaget Prisma. ISBN 91-518-4217-3.
- Michael Linton (1997). Margareta. Nordens drottning 1375–1412. Stockholm: Atlantis. ISBN 91-7486-471-8.
- Sundberg, Ulf (1999). Medeltidens svenska krig. Stockholm: Hjalmarson & Högberg. pp. 190–193. ISBN 91-89080-26-2.
