= Algot Magnusson =

Medieval Swedish magnate

Algot Magnusson, Lord of Räfsnäs (c. 1355 – c. 1426) was a medieval Swedish magnate of the Sture (Sjöblad) family. He served as castellan of the fortification of Styresholm at Kramfors and governor of Ångermanland.

== Biography ==
Algot Magnusson was first mentioned in historical sources in 1374. He was born the son of Magnus Anundsson Sture and Karin Algotsdotter, daughter of Algot Magnusson who belonged to the ancient Västergötland dynasty of justiciars. The family byname Sture, although already used by his father, was not used of Algot. He was usually known as Algot of Räfsnäs.

Through his marriage with Märta Bosdotter of Rigshult, Algot received new positions and moved from Västergötland to the east-coast regions of Sweden: Östergötland and the provinces around the Lake Mälaren. Algot's wife was a first cousin of the High Justiciar Bo Jonsson of Gripsholm (c. 1330 – 1386), then the head of the High Council of Sweden and real leader of the country. Bo Jonsson built his power base by having trusted relatives in important positions including Algot. Bo Jonsson obtained in c. 1383 the fortresses Öresten and Öppensten in Västergötland. Algot was appointed as his governor there.

In 1388, Algot was the first Swedish aristocrat to start support Margaret I of Denmark against Albert, King of Sweden. By 1389, Albert was deposed of Sweden and incarcerated, while the Dowager Queen Margaret became the new ruler.

In 1392–1393 Algot was castellan of Örebro, and the winter 1393–1394 he held power in all Uppland and led the siege of Stockholm, the principal town yet in hands of the deposed King Albert's representatives. King Albert himself was kept imprisoned at Lindholmen Castle in Scania where he spent the next six years.

Algot Magnusson became a member of the National Council in 1395. Algot played a key role in the lengthy peace negotiations in Lindholmen and Helsingborg, which ended with the release of Albert, in exchange for his pledge to pay a large sum in compensation to Queen Margaret, or to give up Stockholm within three years. After the three years, Albert chose to give up Stockholm. After 1398 Queen Margareta took over Styresholm. In 1405, Algot was granted a fief for life as castellan of Styresholm and served as governor over Ångermanland.

By 1400, Algot became owner of the royal estate Räfsnäs (Räfsnäs kungsgård) in Södermanland where he then mainly lived. In 1403–1404, Algot had command of the expedition to Gotland, to regain the island from the Teutonic Order, but the campaign was unsuccessful. In 1419 he received Gripsholm Castle, which he exchanged in 1423 for Nyköping Castle. In his last years, he accompanied King Erik of Pomerania on journeys to other lands. Algot died on 7 March 1425 or 1426, and was buried at Vadstena Abbey.

== Family ==
Around 30 August 1381 Algot married Märta Bosdotter of Ringshult, scion of an important Östgöta family and widow of castellan Christopher Mikelsdorp. Her father was lord Bo Bosson of Ringshult, and her grandmother had been Cecilia Knutsdotter of Aspanes, descendant of several dukes.

The couple had four historically known surviving children:

- Anund Algotson Sture, lord of Räfsnes, who married heiress of Grönskog
- Gustav Algotson Sture, holder of Ängsö who married firstly heiress of Ängsö, and secondly heiress of Lagmansö.
- Karin (Katarina) Algotsdotter of Räfsnes, who first married Karl Karlsson, lord of Ulvåsa (grandson of St. Bridget of Sweden), and secondly knight Håkan Nilsson.
- Marta (Margareta) Algotsdotter of Räfsnes, married the rich knight Erik Jonsson Ummereise, lord of Björnö near Kalmar

When Märta's son Johan Erikson Ummereise died in c. 1440 as last of his line, the Ummereise inheritance became inherited by his surviving cousins. Algot Gustavson Sture from Lagmansö became lord of Björnö.

Karin Algotsdotter had one known daughter from both of her marriages. When the elder, Birgitta Karlsdotter of Ulvåsa, died at the approximate age of nine, bringing to extinction her paternal grandfather's entire line, the surviving mother Karin Algotsdotter inherited Ulvåsa, St. Bridget's family seat. Karin's younger daughter (who inherited Ulvåsa from the mother) married and had children, one of whom married but her children did not survive, and Ulvåsa ended to Ellen Gisladotter of Geddeholm, a half-sibling of these last ones.

Whereas lineages from both sons survive to the present day. One son's family produced, among others, the regent Sten Sture the Elder and his nephews, while the Lagmansö branch on the other hand cognatically continued through short-lived branches of families of Oxenstierna, Tillbakaseende Ulv, Thott, Färla and Gera to barons Oxenstierna.
