= Sophie of Pomerania (Gotland) =

Sofia of Pomerania-Wolgast (died before 21 August 1408), was a German noblewoman. She was the daughter of Duke Bogislav VI of Pomerania-Wolgast and the spouse and widow of a brief ruler of Gotland, the deposed Swedish Prince Eric of Mecklenburg. Before she left the island, she briefly held a position of power herself in Gotland after his death in 1397.

On 12 or 13 February 1396, she married Eric I, Duke of Mecklenburg, son of the deposed Swedish King, Duke Albert of Mecklenburg. She accompanied Duke Eric (as he was called) to the Swedish island of Gotland, which he conquered and ruled with the aid of the Victual Brothers. The couple had no children.

On 26 July 1397, Eric died, and Sofia was left in charge of Gotland. She then appointed Swedish nobleman Sven Sture, an ally of the Victual Brothers, to be her "hövitsman" (regent) in Gotland. In 1398, Sofia left the island in the company of Sven Sture and her late consort's cousin, Duke John of Mecklenburg, when Visby was taken by the Teutonic Knights.

She married Prince Nicolas V of Werle-Waren and became the mother of Jutta of Werle, consort of Prince Henry of Mecklenburg-Stargard
