= Bo Jonsson (Grip) =

Swedish nobleman (died 1386)

Arms of Södermanland, attributed to Bo Jonsson (Grip).

Bo Jonsson (Grip) (early 1330s – 20 August 1386) was head of the royal council and marshal under the regency of Magnus IV of Sweden. Also in the council was his friend and colleague, Karl Ulfsson av Ulvåsa, eldest son of Saint Birgitta. From 1369, during Albert of Sweden’s reign, he was Officialis Generalis (the king's highest official) and from 1371 Lord High Steward (drots in Swedish).

Bo Jonsson dominated the political life of Sweden and Finland for decades. He was the most influential representative to the council of aristocracy that deposed Magnus IV of Sweden in 1365 and installed Albrecht von Mecklenburg on the Swedish throne. His position as the new king's Officialis Generalis granted him vast fiscal and administrative control. By 1374, he had gained title to all of Finland.

The family name, Grip − which Bo Jonsson himself never used − is Swedish for Griffin. A coat of arms showing a black griffin on a gold shield, attributed to Bo Jonsson, was later adopted as the coat of arms of Södermanland. The original family arms, however, may have been Argent, a griffin's head sable, traced back to Tomas Jonsson (Grip) from around 1299.

== Advancement ==
During Bo Jonssons life, the black death swept through Sweden, killing 1/3 of the population. This weakened the Swedish economy and political stability, thus paving the way for Bo Jonsson to acquire large swathes of land.

Through inheritance and unprejudiced methods, Bo Jonsson came to control the largest private non-royal wealth Sweden has ever seen. He usurped 1,500 farms in 350 parishes throughout Sweden, from Kalmar to Falun, through economic and political means. He became Sweden's (and Finland's) largest landowner ever. The quantity of land under his control exceeded 1/3 of the entirety of the Swedish realm, surpassing even the ruling king's national land holdings. In 1363 he was the leader of an aristocratic rebellion. He solicited support from Albert II, Duke of Mecklenburg and in 1365, he became instrumental in removing Magnus Eriksson from the Swedish throne and offering it to the Duke's son.

== Authority ==
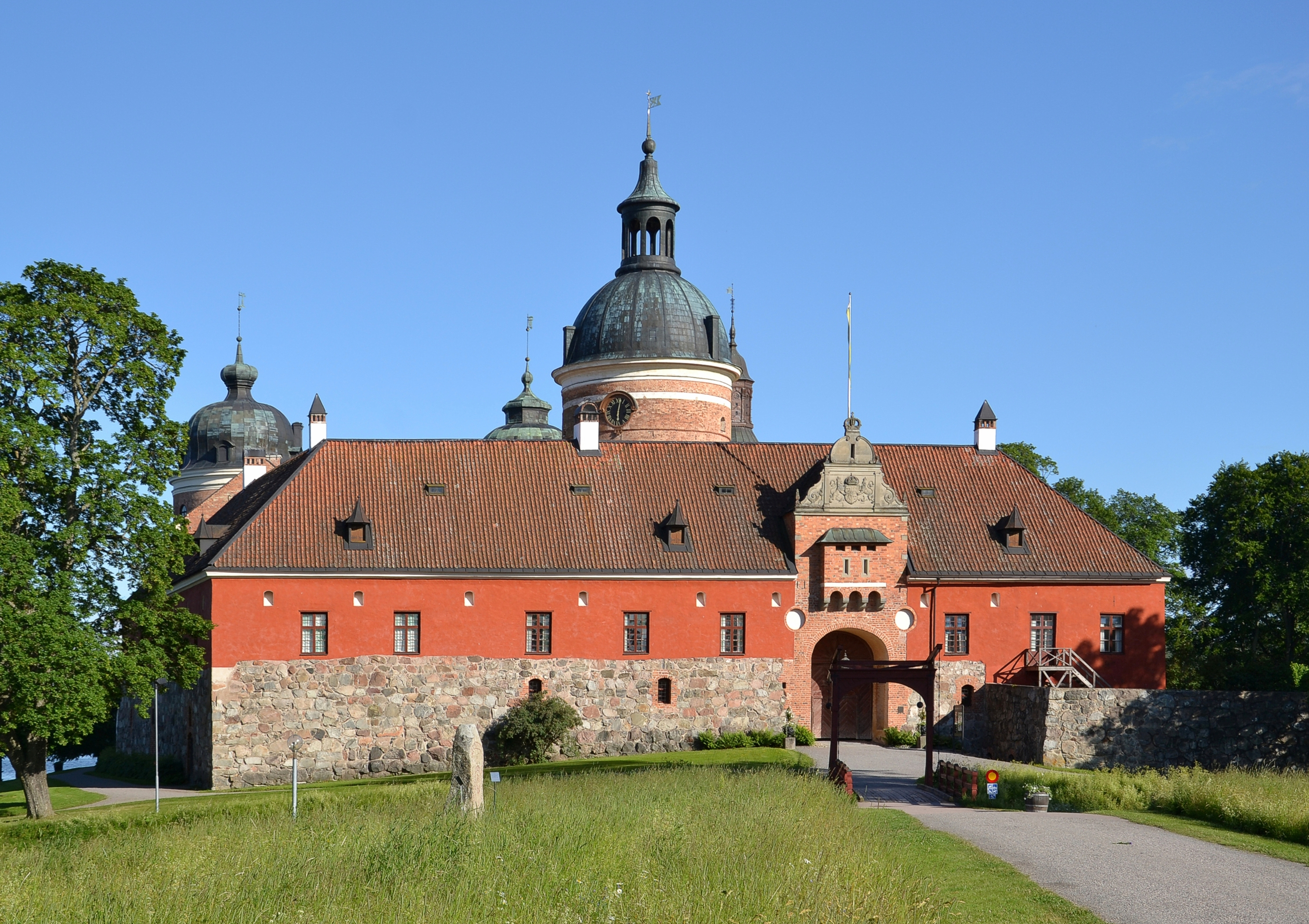
Gripsholm Castle was originally built as Bo Jonsson's seat. It was extended into a royal renaissance palace during the reign of King Gustav I.

From the Gripsholm Castle in Mariefred, which he built, Bo Jonsson governed the entire valley of Lake Mälaren, Hälsingland, all of Finland, large parts of Västergötland, Eastern Östergötland, and the Småland coast, including the city of Kalmar. He secured the Finnish fiefs as a reward for having assisted Albert to the throne of Sweden.

He controlled a dozen fortresses, among which were Finnish Åbo Castle, Tavastehus and Viborg, Swedish Kalmar Castle and Nyköping Castle, in addition to ones built under his own direction: Bjärkaholm, Ringstaholm, and his most prized holding, Gripsholm.

As the head of the governing council and through his personal usurpation of large areas of the country, Bo Jonsson indirectly curtailed the concentration of royal power as well as German and Danish influence. However, he also solicited foreign intervention from Denmark and Mecklenburg in order to install the nobility party's puppet kings on the Swedish throne.

== Marriage ==
Bo Jonsson married twice during his life. His first marriage took place with the wealthy Margareta Persdotter Porse, who died in 1360 shortly thereafter while undergoing childbirth. Allegedly he allowed the baby Jon to be delivered via Caesarean section, though it died but one day later.

His second wife was the German born Margareta Dume, who had many admirers. One of her many suitors was Karl Nilsson, a nobleman from Södermanland. Karl Nilsson was stabbed in front of the high altar at the church of the Greyfriars (Franciscans), nowadays known as Riddarholmskyrkan, in Stockholm, Sweden. Contemporary sources held Bo Jonsson to be guilty, acting in a jealous rage, but he maintained his innocence in witnessed testimonies, swearing his presence to have been elsewhere. Due to his powerful position, he was never charged. Nine days later, the estate formerly belonging to Karl Nilsson fell into the hands of Jonsson.

== Death ==
Bo Jonsson died 20 August 1386 and donated in his will a substantial part of his wealth to monasteries and churches in Sweden. In particular he gave aid to the monastery in Vadstena, operated by the Bridgittine Order and dedicated to Saint Birgitta whom Bo Jonsson had dedicated a big part of his life to get canonized. To ensure that the rest of his possessions would not fall into the hands of king Albert of Sweden whom he did not hold in very high regard he appointed a council of lords who would govern them in his name. The struggle between the king and this council concerning the huge estates he left behind would eventually lead to the Kalmar Union.

== Progeny ==
Bo Jonsson's first wife Margareta Persdotter Porse, who died at childbirth in 1360, bore him a son Jon Bosson, who died the same day. With his second wife Greta Lambrektsdotter (Dume), he had at least two children, history tells about his son Knut Bosson (Grip) who was once castellan of Åbo Castle, and daughter Margareta Bosdotter who married Detler Bylow. The second marriage possibly produced other daughters too, but they are unnamed in historical sources.

He was influential in the expansion of the medieval Finnish economy and his descendants were created barons in 1561 (see Grip av Vinäs).
