= Broder Svensson =

Swedish politician (died 1436)

Broder Svensson (died 1436) was a Swedish knight, military commander and privateer.

Broder Svensson may have come from the same family as Abraham Brodersson. He participated in the Dano-Hanseatic War or 1426–35 as commander of a number of privateers but was taken prisoner in 1432 by Hanseatic forces and spent time as a prisoner of war in Lübeck. In 1343 he is recorded as being back in Sweden and fighting in the Engelbrekt rebellion against Eric of Pomerania. He is mentioned in 1436, during the siege of Varberg, as one of the commanders of the Swedish army. The same year he came into conflict with Charles VIII of Sweden and condemned to death.
