= Albert II of Holstein-Rendsburg =

Albert II
- Count of Holstein-Rendsburg
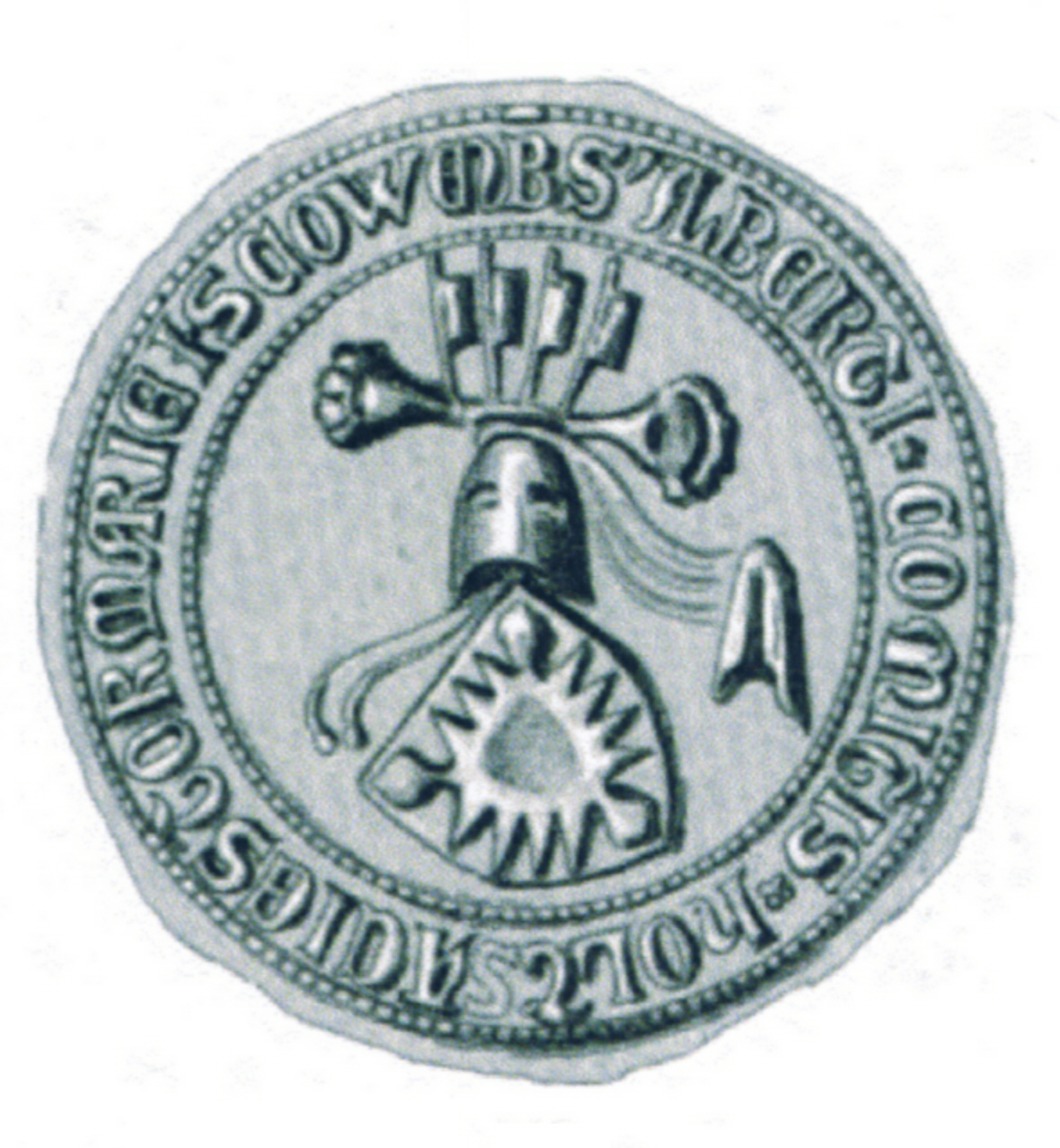
- Seal of Albert II from around 1402
- Born: c. 1369
- Died: 28 September 1403; Dithmarschen (Ditmarsh)
- Buried: Itzehoe
- Noble family: House of Schauenburg
- Spouse: Agnes of Saxe-Lauenburg
- Father: Henry II, Count of Holstein-Rendsburg
- Mother: Ingeborg of Mecklenburg

Albert II of Holstein (c. 1369 – 28 September 1403 in Dithmarschen (Ditmarsh)) was the ruling Count of Holstein-Rendsburg from his father's death, in 1381 or 1384, until 1397. From 1397 until his death, he was Count of Holstein-Segeberg.

== Life ==
He was a son of Henry II, Count of Holstein-Rendsburg and his wife, Ingeborg of Mecklenburg. After his father's death, his uncle Nicholas coordinated, as the senior member of the House of Schauenburg, the cooperation of the various Counts of Schauenburg and Holstein. Nicholas died on 28 August 1397. After Nicholas' death, Albert II and his elder brother Gerhard VI divided the counties of Holstein and Stormarn among themselves. Albert II chose Segeberg as his residence, he also wanted a share of the Duchy of Schleswig, which Gerhard VI held as a fief from King Olaf II of Denmark. However, under Danish law, he was not entitled to part of the fief.

His father-in-law, Duke Eric IV of Saxe-Lauenburg raided Ditmarsh. This triggered a renewal in 1402-1404 of the ongoing feud between Ditmarsh and the Counts of Holstein-Rendsburg. The background of this conflict was that the farming communities of Ditmarsh were officially subjects of the Prince-Archbishopric of Bremen, but in practice, Ditmarsh was an independent area, subject only to the Emperor. For decades, the Counts of Holstein-Rendsburg tried to subjugate the area. After his raid, Eric withdrew across Albert II's territory, and the farmers of Ditmarsh accused Albert II of complicity. Albert II denied having anything to do with Eric's raid. The lower nobility and councillors pushed Albert and Gerhard to renew their attempts to conquer Ditmarsh. Albert followed this advice energetically. During the fighting in Ditmarsh, he fell off his horse while making an evasive maneuver, and died of his injuries.

== Marriage ==
Albert was married to Agnes (d. before 1415), a daughter of Duke Eric IV of Saxe-Lauenburg (d. 1412) and Sophia of Brunswick-Lüneburg (d. 1416). The marriage remained childless.

== Footnotes ==
Albert II of Holstein-Rendsburg House of Schauenburg Born: c. 1369 Died: 28 September 1403
Preceded by Henry II and Nicholas as Counts of Holstein-Rendsburg	Counts of Holstein-Rendsburg; 1381/1384–1397 with his brother Gerhard VI (1381/1384–1404) and his uncle Nicholas (1340–1397)	Succeeded by Gerhard VI
Preceded by Adolph IX as Count of Holstein-Kiel (line extinct in 1390, merged into Rendsburg)	Counts of Holstein-Rendsburg; 1381/1384–1397 with his brother Gerhard VI (1381/1384–1404) and his uncle Nicholas (1340–1397)	Succeeded by Gerhard VI
New division	Count of Holstein-Segeberg; 1397–1403	Segeberg reverted to Holstein-Rendsburg
