= Nicholas, Count of Holstein-Rendsburg =

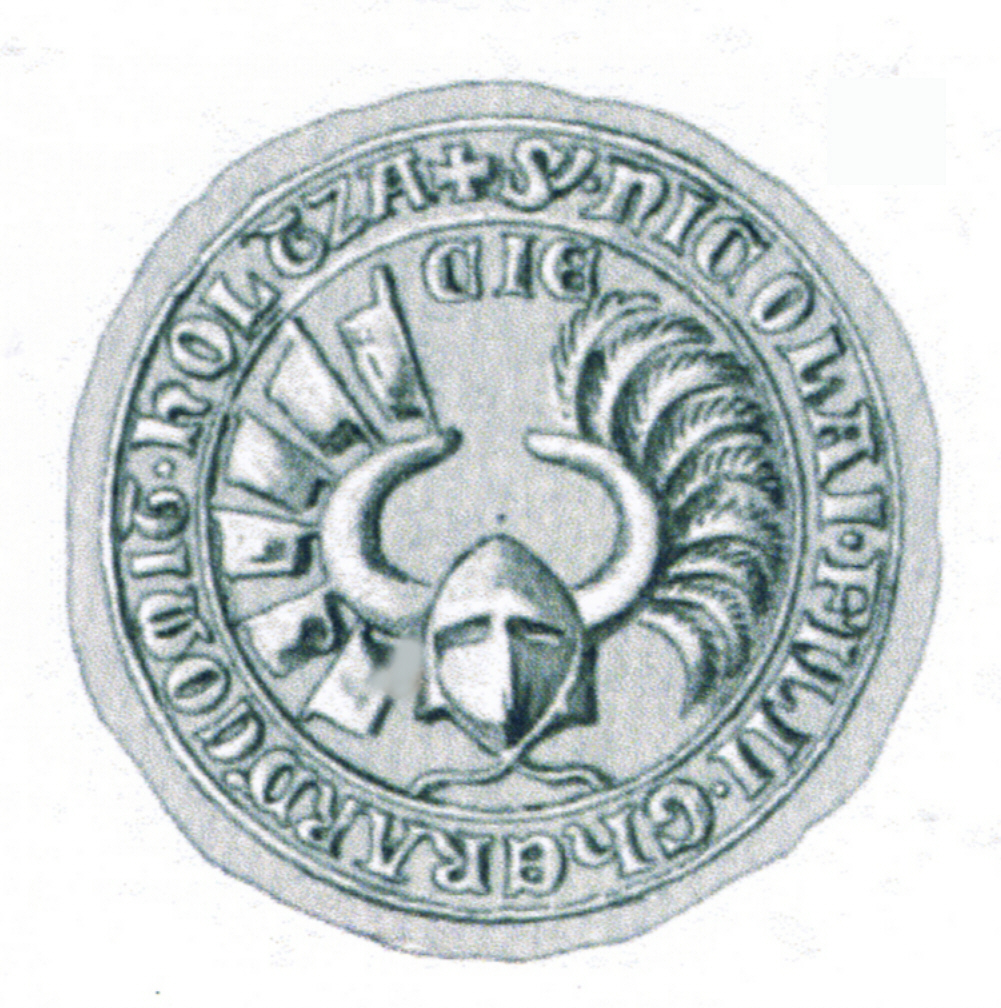
- Seal of Nicholas of Holstein, dating from c. 1342-1343
- Born: 1321
- Died: 8 May 1397; Itzehoe
- Buried: Itzehoe
- Noble family: House of Schauenburg
- Spouse: Elisabeth of Brunswick-Lüneburg
- Father: Gerhard III of Holstein
- Mother: Sophia of Werle

Nicholas, Count of Schauenburg and Holstein-Rendsburg (also known as Claus of Holstein; 1321 – 8 May 1397 in Itzehoe) was a titular Count of Schauenburg. Together first with his brother and then with his nephews, Nicholas was the co-ruling Count of Holstein-Rendsburg from 1340 until his death. In 1390 Nicholas and his nephews inherited Holstein-Kiel, which itself included former Holstein-Plön through reversion in 1350. So except of Holstein-Pinneberg Nicholas and his nephews had united all of Holstein. He was also co-ruler of Schleswig from 1375 to 1386. He was thus a leading member of the House of Schauenburg and an influential figure in the area north of the Elbe. He was the second son of Count Gerhard III of Holstein-Rendsburg and his wife, Sophia of Werle.

He ruled Schleswig jointly with his elder brother Henry II from 1375 to 1384, thereafter alone. In 1386, he abdicated as Duke of Schleswig in favour of Henry II's son Gerhard VI of Holstein-Rendsburg, who was confirmed as Gerhard II as Duke of Schleswig by King Olaf II of Denmark.

In 1354, he married Elisabeth, the daughter of Duke William II of Brunswick and Lüneburg, Prince of Lunenburg. She was the widow of Otto of Saxe-Wittenberg, a son of Rudolph I. They had one daughter:

- Elisabeth (1360 – 25 January 1416 in Cammin), married:
  1. Duke Albert IV of Mecklenburg-Schwerin (1363–1388)
  2. in 1404 to Duke Eric V of Saxe-Lauenburg (c. 1374 – 1435)

Nicholas died in 1397 and was buried in Itzehoe. His nephew Gerhard VI acted as guardian for his underage daughter Elisabeth. After Nicholas' death his co-ruling nephews Albert II and the elder Gerhard VI partitioned Holstein-Segeberg as a secundogeniture for Albert from Holstein-Rendsburg. Gerhard VI then continued ruling Holstein-Rendsburg as the sole count.

== Notes ==
Nicholas (Claus) of Schauenburg House of Schauenburg Born: 1321 Died: 8 May 1397
Regnal titles
Preceded by Gerhard III as Count of Holstein-Rendsburg	Counts of Holstein-Rendsburg; 1340-1397 with his brother Henry II (1340–1381/1384) his nephew Albert II (1381/1384–1397) his nephew Gerhard VI (1381/1384–1404)	Succeeded by Albert II as Count of Holstein-Segeberg
Preceded by Adolph IX as Count of Holstein-Kiel (line extinct in 1390)	Counts of Holstein-Rendsburg; 1340-1397 with his brother Henry II (1340–1381/1384) his nephew Albert II (1381/1384–1397) his nephew Gerhard VI (1381/1384–1404)	Succeeded by Gerhard VI or II
Preceded by Henry I	Dukes of Schleswig; 1375-1386 with his brother Henry II (1375–1381/1384)	Succeeded by Gerhard VI or II
