= Albert V of Mecklenburg =

Duke of Mecklenburg

Albert V, Duke of Mecklenburg
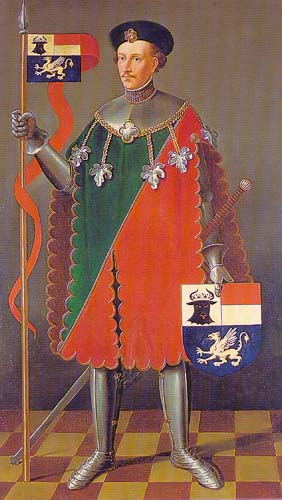
- 19th-century portrait of Albert V by Theodor Fischer
- Born: 1397
- Died: between 1 June 1423 and 6 December 1423
- Noble family: House of Mecklenburg
- Spouse: Margaret of Brandenburg
- Father: Albert, King of Sweden
- Mother: Agnes of Brunswick-Lüneburg

Albert V, Duke of Mecklenburg (1397 – 1 June /6 December 1423) was Duke of Mecklenburg from 1412 until his death.

== Life ==
Albert V was the son of former King Albert of Sweden and Agnes (II) of Brunswick-Lüneburg, daughter of Duke Magnus II, Duke of Brunswick-Lüneburg. Albert III died in 1412 and, in accordance with an agreement with John IV, Agnes acted as guardian and regent for Albert V. In 1415 or 1416 he started ruling for himself. After John IV died in 1422, Albert V and John IV's widow acted as co-regents for her minor sons Henry IV and John V.

On 13 February 1419, Albert V and John IV together with the Council of the Hanseatic City of Rostock founded the University of Rostock as the first university in northern Germany and in the entire Baltic region.

Since 1413 Albert had been engaged to Cecilia, the second daughter of the Burgrave Frederick of Nuremberg, later Elector of Brandenburg. However, Albert and Cecilia never married. Instead, Albert married Cecilia's sister Margaret in 1423. Frederick gave Albert the districts of Dömitz and Gorlosen as her dowry. However, Albert died shortly after he and Margaret were married.

== Sources ==
- Wigger, Friedrich (1885). "Stammtafeln des Großherzoglichen Hauses von Meklenburg". Jahrbücher des Vereins für Mecklenburgische Geschichte und Altertumskunde. 50: 111–326.

Albert V of Mecklenburg House of Mecklenburg Born: 1397 Died: 1423
Preceded by Albert III	Duke of Mecklenburg; 1412–1423	Succeeded by Henry IV
