= Agnes of Brunswick-Lüneburg =

Duchess of Mecklenburg from 1396 to 1412

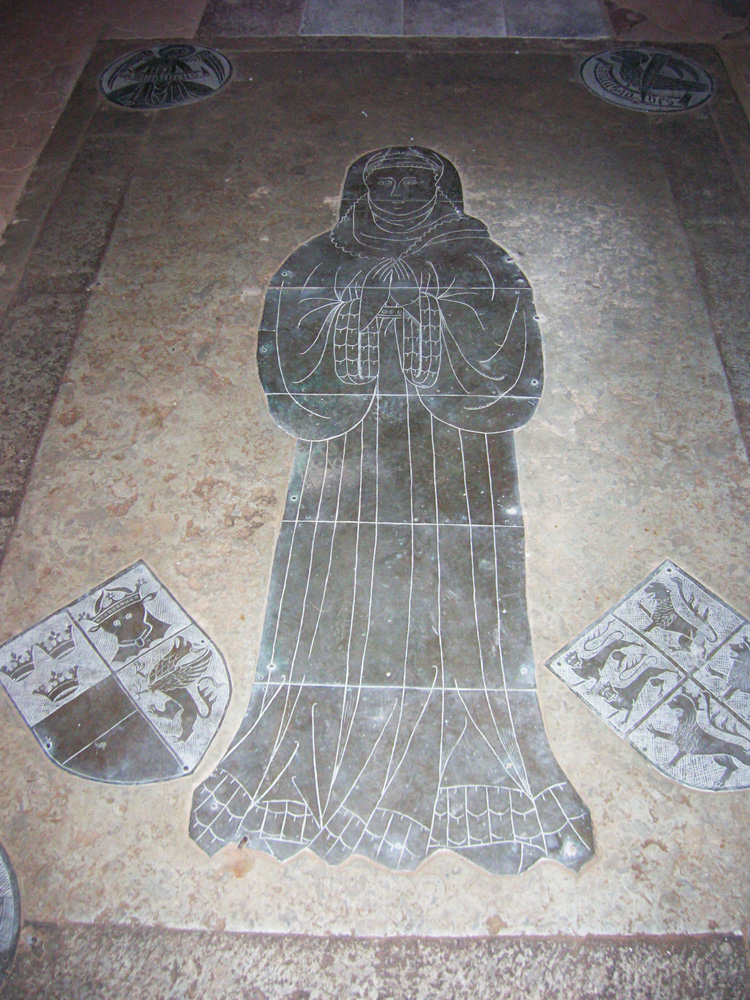
- The monumental brass on Agnes' funerary monument at City Church of St Jacob and St Dionysus in Gadebusch
- Born: before 1356
- Died: between 1 August 1430 and 22 December 1434
- Buried: Gadebusch
- Noble family: House of Guelph
- Spouses: Burkhard V, Count of Mansfeld; Bogislaw VI, Duke of Pomerania; Albert, King of Sweden
- Issue: Albert V, Duke of Mecklenburg
- Father: Magnus II, Duke of Brunswick-Lüneburg
- Mother: Catharine of Anhalt-Bernburg

Agnes of Brunswick-Lüneburg (before 1356 – 1430/1434) was a Duchess of Brunswick-Lüneburg by birth and, by marriage, Countess of Mansfield, Duchess of Pomerania and finally Duchess of Mecklenburg. She was a daughter of Duke Magnus II of Brunswick-Lüneburg (died 1373) and Catharine of Anhalt-Bernburg (died 1390).

In 1366 Agnes married Count Burkhard V (VIII) of Mansfeld (died c. 1389/1390). Between 1389 and 1391, Agnes married a second time, to Duke Bogislaw VI of Pomerania (died 1393) in Celle. Agnes married a third time in Schwerin, on 12/13 February 1396, to Duke Albert III of Mecklenburg (died 1412), who had formerly been king of Sweden. The couple had one son: Albert V (died 1423), who was Duke of Mecklenburg and Schwerin.

Agnes is not considered a queen of Sweden because Albert had definitely been deposed in Sweden before they were married, but in Mecklenburg she was regarded as titular queen, since Albert did not renounce his claims to Sweden until 1405.

Agnes died sometime between 1 August 1430 and 22 December 1434 and was buried in Gadebusch.
