= Styresholm =

Fortress in Sweden

Coordinates: 63°4′37″N 17°45′40″E

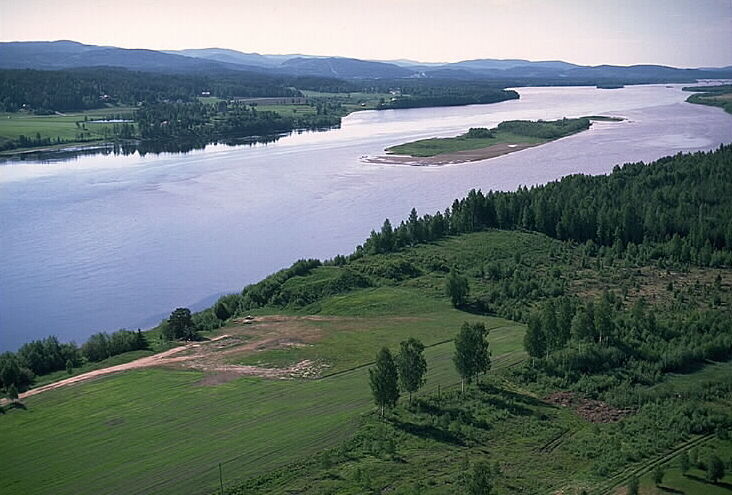
Styresholm

Styresholm was a medieval fortress in present-day Kramfors Municipality. Today it is on the banks of the Ångermanälven, although in the 14th century it was on an island in the river, as the water level was several metres higher than today.

The fortress was built by the pirate group Victual Brothers in the late 14th century as one of a series of fortresses in the Gulf of Bothnia. The name is first recorded in 1398 when its ownership was transferred to Queen Margaret I; a Danish governor was appointed in 1400.
