= Newmarch =

Newmarch is a surname, and may refer to:

- Ann Newmarch (1945–2022), South Australian artist
- Oliver Newmarch (1835–1920), British Indian Army officer
- Rosa Newmarch (1857–1940), English poet and writer on music
- Sally Newmarch (born 1975), Australian Olympic rower
- William Newmarch (1820–1882), English banker and economist
- Mary Newmarch Prescott (1849–1888), American magazine writer and poet

== See also ==
- Newmarch Gallery, an art gallery in Adelaide, South Australia
