= Konrad von Jungingen =

Grandmaster of the Teutonic Order (1393–1407)

- Hochmeister
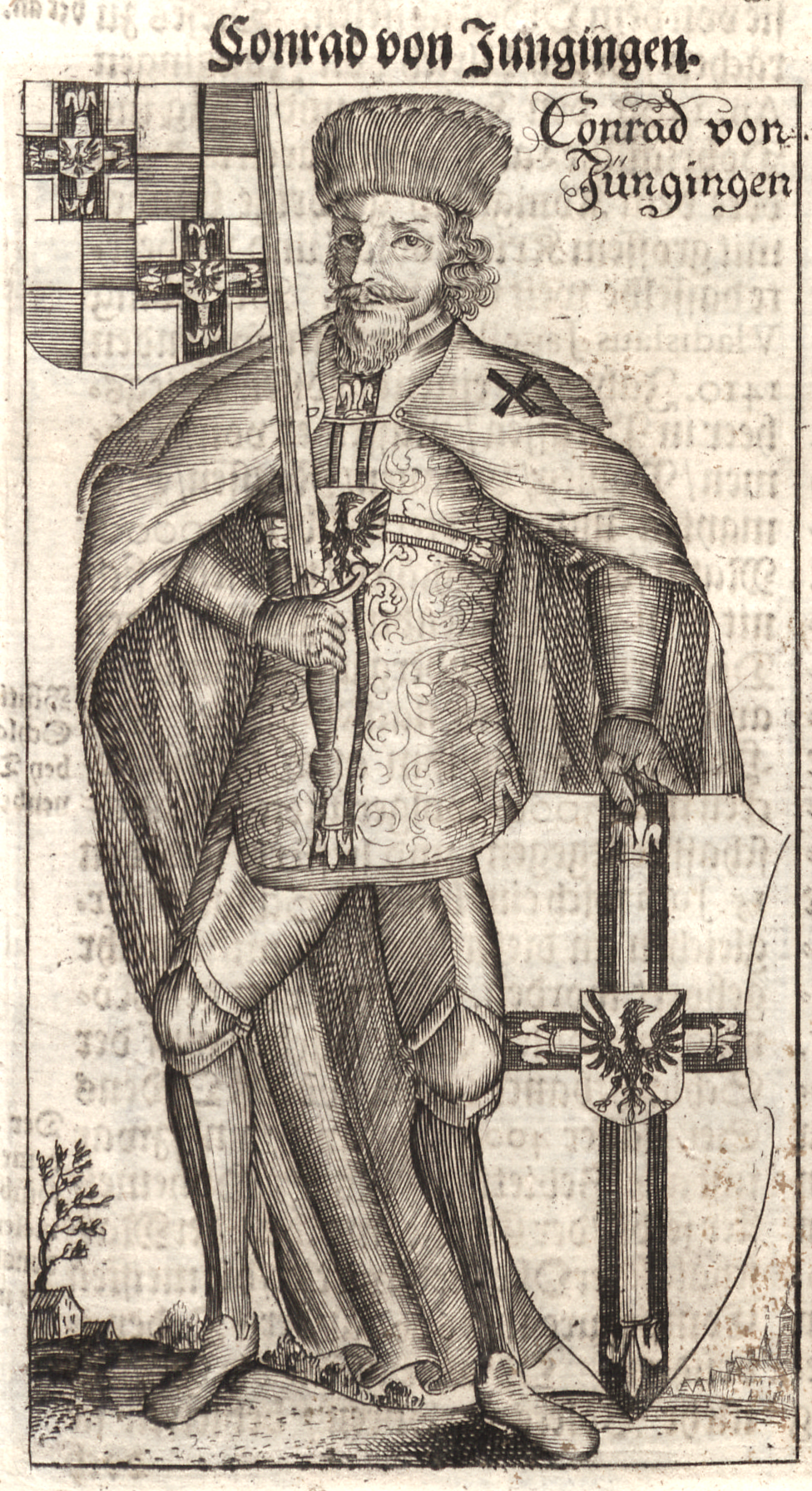
- 17th century depiction of Konrad from Christoph Hartknoch's Old and New Prussia or a Two-Part History of Prussia

Grand Master of the Teutonic Knights
- Reign: 30 November 1393 – 30 March 1407
- Predecessor: Konrad von Wallenrode
- Successor: Ulrich von Jungingen
- Born: c. 1355; Probably Hohenfels Castle, Marienburg
- Died: 30 March 1407
- Burial: Under the Chapel of St. Anne in the Malbork Castle, Marienburg

Konrad von Jungingen (c. 1355–30 March 1407) was a Grand Master of the Teutonic Order from 1393 to 1407. Under his administration, the Teutonic Order would reach its greatest extent.

Von Jungingen came from a Swabian lower nobility family. He was presumably the eldest son of the advocatus Wolfgang von Jungingen and his wife Ursula von Hohenfels.

He came from the Swabian League and joined the Teutonic Order together with his younger brother Ulrich around 1380. At first, he was a commander at the castle in Osterode. In 1391, he was promoted to the Treasurer of Marienburg.

Konrad's election to Grand Master and head of the Order arose in an indirect fashion. As chairman of the order, policy excluded him from consideration. One of the brothers, Wolf von Zolnhart, proposed his candidacy for the post of grand master. His proposal went unopposed, and on 30 November 1393, he was elected unanimously as Grand Master.

Konrad opted to retain most of the policies of his predecessors. However, unlike them, he chose the path of diplomacy. He interfered with the Lithuanian Civil War between the great princes by once supporting Vytautas and another time Skirgaila. He also intended to weaken Poland–Lithuania and the superior rights of Jogaila to the Grand Duchy of Lithuania.

Thanks to his clever policy, he obtained Samogitia for the Order. In 1402, taking advantage of the financial problems of Sigismund von Luxembourg, he bought the Neumarch. However, territorial acquisitions brought him more problems than benefits. In the Neumarch, the local knights objected to the dictatorial power of the Order, and a peasant uprising, instigated by Jogaila, broke out in Samogitia.

In 1398, King Albert of Sweden pledged the island of Gotland to the Order in an attempt to curtail the predatory attacks of the Victual Brothers on maritime shipping throughout the Baltic Sea. Later that year, Konrad led a successful invasion force and destroyed Visby. That would bring Konrad into conflict with the newly-formed Kalmar Union under Queen Margaret I of Denmark when the Order refused to relinquish Gotland.

The threat of war on all sides forced Konrad to seek agreement with one of his rivals. In that situation, he decided to make diplomatic overtures to Kraków. In 1404, he met Ladislaus in the bishopric of Kuyavia in Raciążek. His cessation of Dobrzyn to the Polish Crown guaranteed peace with Poland–Lithuania.

He died after a long illness on 30 March 1407 in Marienburg. He was buried in the mausoleum of the great masters under the chapel of St. Anne. According to the Chronicle of Gdańsk, the dying Grand Master warned the Teutonic dignitaries against choosing his militant brother as a successor and called him a fool. Despite this, Ulrich was elected unanimously to succeed him.

Grand Master of the Teutonic Order
Preceded by Konrad von Wallenrode	Hochmeister; 1393–1407	Succeeded by Ulrich von Jungingen
