= Åsle =

Settlement in Falköping Municipality, Sweden

Coordinates: 58°11′N 13°41′E

Åsle is a locality situated in Falköping Municipality, Västra Götaland County, Sweden.

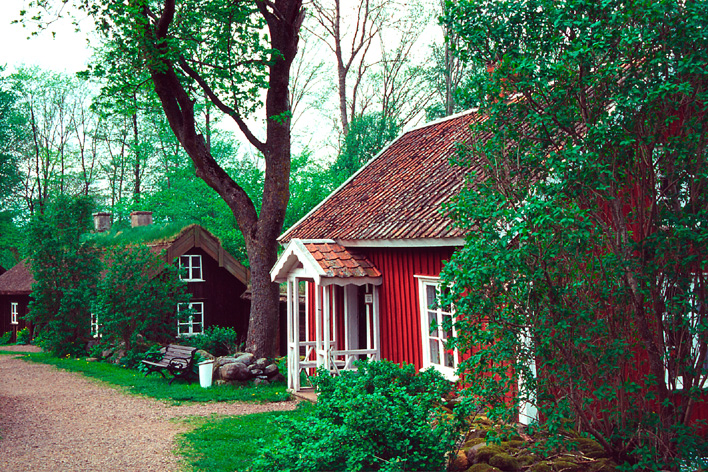
