= Magnus I of Mecklenburg =

Duke of Mecklenburg (1345–1384)

Magnus I, Duke of Mecklenburg
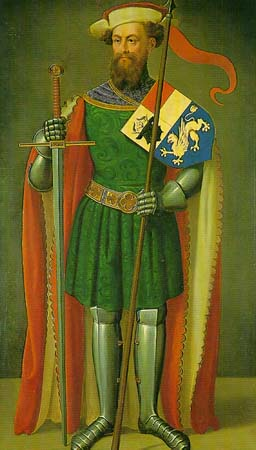
- Born: 1345
- Died: 1 September 1384 (aged 38–39)
- Spouse: Elizabeth of Pomerania-Wolgast
- Father: Albert II, Duke of Mecklenburg
- Mother: Euphemia of Sweden

Magnus I, Duke of Mecklenburg (1345 – 1 September 1384) was Duke of Mecklenburg from 1383 until his death. Magnus was the third son of Duke Albert II of Mecklenburg and his wife Euphemia of Sweden, the sister of the King Magnus IV of Sweden. Sometime after 1362, he married Elizabeth of Pomerania-Wolgast, daughter of Barnim IV, Duke of Pomerania.

Magnus had two children:

- John IV, Regent of Mecklenburg from 1384 to 1395 and co-regent from 1395 to 1422
- Euphemia (d. 16 October 1417);

married on 18 October 1397 with Lord Balthasar of Werle

After the death of his brother Henry III in 1383, he ruled Mecklenburg jointly with Henry's son Albert IV until his own death in 1384.

== Sources ==
- Wigger, Friedrich (1885). "Stammtafeln des Großherzoglichen Hauses von Meklenburg". Jahrbücher des Vereins für Mecklenburgische Geschichte und Altertumskunde. 50: 111–326.

Magnus I of Mecklenburg House of Mecklenburg Born: 1345 Died: 1 September 1384
Preceded by Henry III	Duke of Mecklenburg; 1383-1384	Succeeded by John IV
