= Albert II of Mecklenburg =

Duke of Mecklenburg from 1347 to 1379

Albert II, Duke of Mecklenburg
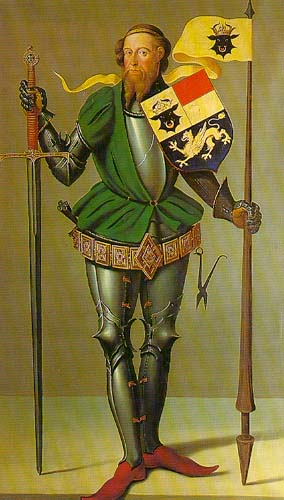
- 19th-century portrait of Albert II by Theodor Fischer
- Born: c. 1318
- Died: 18 February 1379
- Noble family: House of Mecklenburg
- Spouses: Euphemia of Sweden; Adelheid of Hohenstein
- Issue: Henry; Albert; Magnus; Ingeborg; Anna
- Father: Henry II, Lord of Mecklenburg
- Mother: Anna of Saxe-Wittenberg

Albert II, Duke of Mecklenburg (c. 1318 – 18 February 1379) was a feudal lord in Northern Germany on the shores of the Baltic Sea. He reigned as the head of the House of Mecklenburg. His princely seat was located in Schwerin beginning in the 1350s.

== Life ==
Albert was born in Schwerin as the second (but eldest surviving) son of Lord Henry II of Mecklenburg (c. 1266–1329), Lord of Stargard (Stari Gard), of the old Vendic princely clan of the Obotrites, and his second wife Princess Anna of Saxe-Wittenberg (d. 1327), of the princely Ascanian House.

Duke Albert succeeded his father as reigning Prince (or Lord) of Mecklenburg in 1329. He was also keenly interested in obtaining influence in Scandinavia, e.g. fiefs or income. The Holy Roman Emperor Charles IV elevated Mecklenburg to the status of a Duchy in 1348, through which Albert (together with his younger brother John) became the first Duke of Mecklenburg.

On 10 April 1336, Albert married a kinswoman, the Scandinavian heiress Euphemia of Sweden and Norway. Her father was the Swedish duke Erik Magnusson, and her mother was Princess Ingeborg of Norway, the heiress and the only legitimate daughter of King Haakon V of Norway. Through this marriage, Albert gained standing in Sweden by means of his wife's hereditary estates and ancestral connections. These enabled him to participate in the internal politics of Scandinavia. Due to his scheming and avarice, the Swedes nicknamed him "The Fox of Mecklenburg."

Albert arranged for his eldest son, the future Henry III of Mecklenburg, to marry Ingeborg, the eldest daughter and potential heiress of King Valdemar IV of Denmark. Prince Henry married her some time around 1362, and their infant son was soon offered unsuccessfully as heir to the kingdom of Denmark in competition with Valdemar's youngest daughter, Queen Margaret of Norway, the future ruler of the Kalmar Union.

Albert's brother-in-law King Magnus IV of Sweden faced grave difficulties beginning in the 1350s. Influential nobles attempted to curb the concentration of royal power in Sweden and set up Magnus' own elder son Eric as a rival king. After young Eric's death, Albert's second son and namesake Albert became the next puppet claimant of the noble party in Sweden.

Duke Albert was deeply involved in trying to make his son king in Sweden, but with himself as the real power behind the throne. The younger Albert deposed his uncle Magnus IV from the Swedish throne and ascended as King Albert of Sweden.

Already in Albert and Euphemia's lifetime it was recognized that her genealogical position would become a pivotal point for any future claims to the Scandinavian thrones.

When his first wife died, Duke Albert married a second time to Countess Adelheid of Hohenstein, daughter of Count Ulrich of Hohenstein. That marriage apparently was childless.

Duke Albert had five surviving children born from his marriage with Euphemia: sons Henry, Albert and Magnus and daughters Ingeborg and Anna (1343-1415), who married Count Adolph IX of Holstein-Kiel.

== Ancestry ==
Albert II of Mecklenburg House of Mecklenburg-Schwerin Cadet branch of the House of Mecklenburg Born: 1318 Died: February 18 1379
Regnal titles
Preceded by Henry II	Lord of Mecklenburg; 1329-1347	Succeeded by Became Duke
Preceded by New creation	Duke of Mecklenburg-Schwerin; 1347-1379	Succeeded by Henry III
Preceded by Nicholas I	Count of Schwerin; 1358-1379	Succeeded by Henry III
