= Albert, King of Sweden =

King of Sweden from 1364 to 1389

Albert
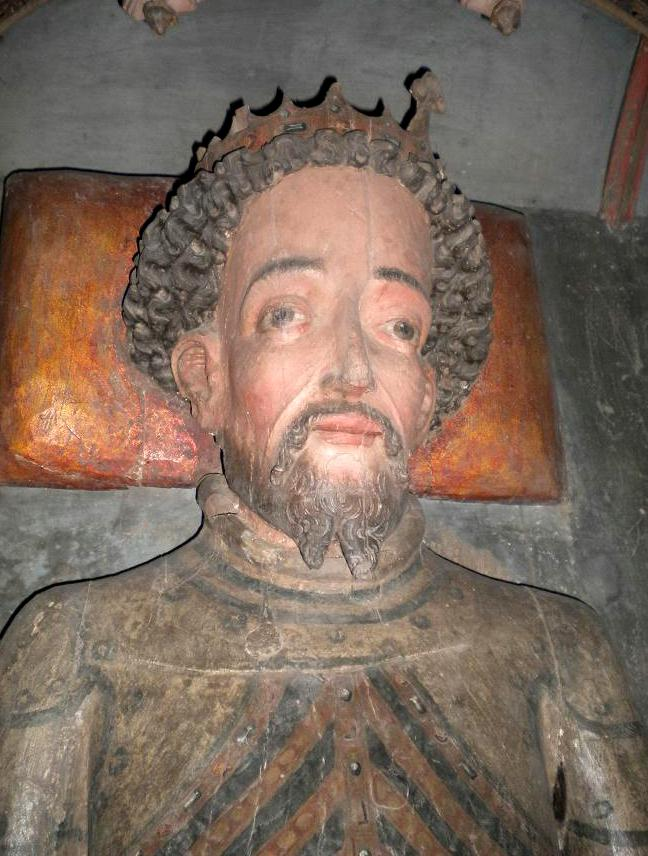
- Albert's portrait sculpture on his contemporary grave monument

King of Sweden
- Reign: 1364–1389
- Predecessor: Magnus IV and Haakon
- Successor: Margaret

Duke of Mecklenburg-Schwerin
- Reign: 1384–1412
- Predecessor: Magnus I
- Successor: Albert V
- Born: c. 1338; Mecklenburg
- Died: 1 April 1412 (aged 73–74)
- Burial: Doberan Abbey
- Spouses: Richardis of Schwerin (m. 1359; died 1377) Agnes of Brunswick-Lüneburg (m. 1396)
- Issue: Erik, Duke of Mecklenburg; Richardis Catherine, Duchess of Görlitz; Albert V, Duke of Mecklenburg
- House: Mecklenburg-Schwerin
- Father: Albert II, Duke of Mecklenburg
- Mother: Euphemia of Sweden

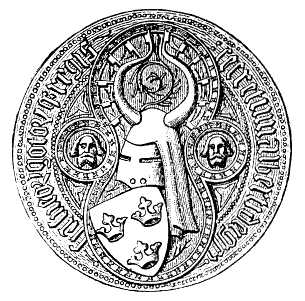
Royal seal of King Albert

Albert (German: Albrecht, c. 1338 – 1 April 1412), also known as Albert of Mecklenburg (Swedish: Albrekt av Mecklenburg), was King of Sweden from 1364 to 1389 and Duke of Mecklenburg-Schwerin from 1384 to 1412.

== Background ==
He was the second son of Duke Albert II of Mecklenburg and Euphemia Eriksdotter, the daughter of Duke Erik Magnusson and sister of King Magnus Eriksson of Sweden and Norway.

In 1384, he inherited the ducal title of Mecklenburg and united it with Sweden in a personal union. Albert based his claim to the Swedish crown on his family ties: his mother, whose paternal grandfather was King Magnus Ladulås, positioned him as the first in line for the Swedish throne after the dethronement or deaths of all of Magnus Eriksson's children. Additionally, Albert traced his lineage through Princess Christina, a daughter of Sverker II, who was King of Sweden from 1196 to 1208.

== Reign ==
In 1363, members of the Swedish Council of Aristocracy, led by Bo Jonsson Grip, arrived at the court of Mecklenburg. They had been banished from Sweden after a revolt against King Magnus Eriksson, Albert's uncle who was unpopular with the nobility. At the nobles' request, Albert launched an invasion of Sweden supported by several German dukes and counts and several Hanseatic cities in Northern Germany. Stockholm and Kalmar in Sweden, with large Hanseatic populations, also welcomed the intervention.

Albert was proclaimed King of Sweden on 18 February 1364. The ceremony took place at the Stones of Mora. A fragment still remains of the stone commemorating the occasion called the Three Crowns stone. This is one of the earliest known example of the use of the three crowns as a national symbol for Sweden.

The arrival of Albert led to eight years of civil war in Sweden between Albert's and Magnus's supporters. In a battle near Enköping in 1365 between Albert's German forces and those of King Magnus, supported by king Haakon VI of Norway, Magnus's surviving son, Magnus was defeated and taken prisoner by Albert. After the initial defeat, King Valdemar IV of Denmark, Haakon's father-in-law, intervened on Magnus's and Haakon's behalf, and Valdemar's forces were joined by Swedish peasants who supported Magnus. Apart from German strongholds like Stockholm, Albert was unpopular among Swedes who were discontent with Albert's policy of appointing Germans as officials in all the Swedish provinces.

With the help of Danish and Swedish allies, King Haakon managed to temporarily beat back Albert and lay siege on Stockholm in 1371. However, the siege was short-lived; with military help from the Swedish nobility in Stockholm, Albert was able to beat back the Norwegians and the Danes. A peace agreement was signed, with the condition that Magnus be released and allowed to travel freely back to Norway (where he had also been king until 1355 and now spent the rest of his life). Albert had secured the Swedish crown, but was also forced to make a belated coronation oath in which he agreed to extensive concessions to the Swedish nobility in the regency council. Bo Jonsson (Grip) used this power to personally usurp 1,500 farms and he soon became Sweden's largest landowner, controlling a third of the entirety of the Swedish territory and possessing the largest non-royal wealth in the country.

== Deposition ==
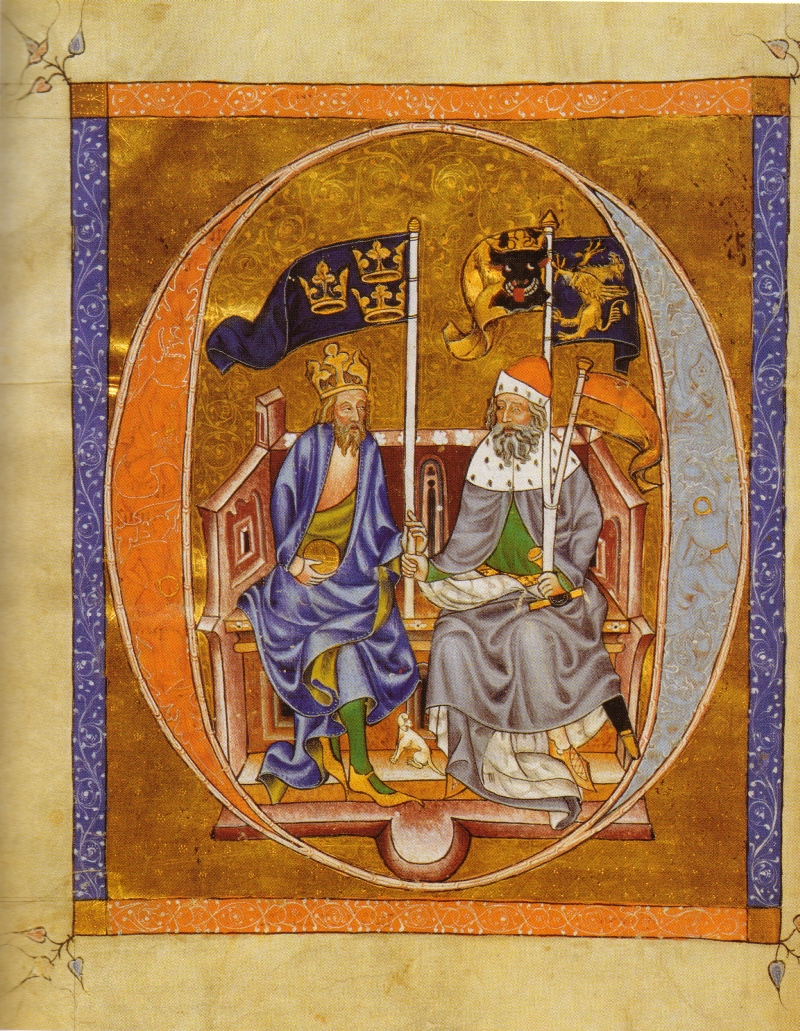
King Albert (left) with his father Duke Albert II of Mecklenburg

Albert kept the crown of Sweden for another 19 years, but most of western Sweden did not support his reign. When he attempted to introduce reduction of the large estates of the Swedish nobility, he lost his support in Stockholm. In 1389, facing a loss of landholdings and wealth, the Swedish regency council turned to Haakon's widow Margaret to plead for help in getting rid of Albert. Queen Margaret sent troops and in February 1389, they defeated Albert at the Battle of Åsle. Albert was captured, deposed and sent to Lindholmen Castle in Scania, where he spent the next six years imprisoned. He was released after 16 days of peace negotiations in 1395, during which he agreed to either give up Stockholm within three years, or pay large sums in retribution to Margaret. When the three years were up, Albert's (then) only son Erik had died after ruling Gotland in Sweden for a short time as instigated by his father, and Albert chose to give up Stockholm rather than pay the fine. In 1398 the agreement came into force, granting Margaret possession of Stockholm.

Albert returned to Mecklenburg, remarried (to Agnes of Brunswick-Lüneburg), had another son and reigned as Duke of Mecklenburg-Schwerin until his death, seven months before Margaret's in 1412. He had finally formally abdicated his Swedish throne in 1405, but until then he and his wife styled themselves King and Queen of Sweden. His tomb is in the Doberan Minster in Bad Doberan, Germany.

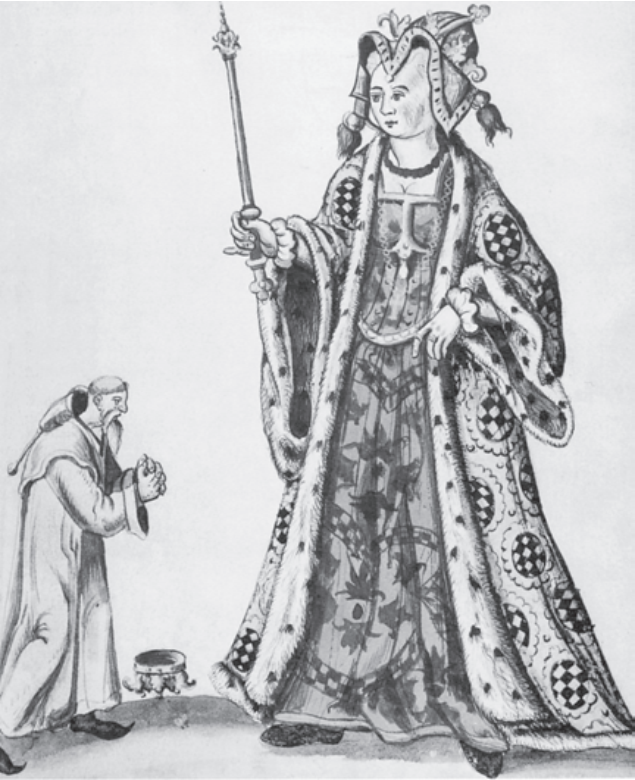
King Albert begs Queen Margaret for mercy as imagined in 1589

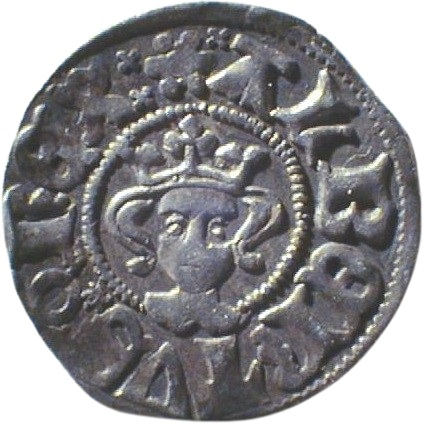
One of King Albert's coins

== Marriages and children ==
Albert married Richardis of Schwerin, daughter of count Otto of Schwerin, in a marriage contracted in Wismar on 12 October 1352. The King and Queen had two children:

1. Erik (died 1397), Swedish crown prince and ruler of Gotland
2. Richardis Catherine (died 1400), married in Prague in 1388 to Emperor Charles IV's fifth son John of Bohemia (1370–1396), Margrave of Moravia and Duke of Görlitz (Lusatia).

Queen Richardis died in 1377 and was buried in Stockholm.

In February 1396 a double wedding was arranged in Schwerin. Albert married Agnes of Brunswick-Lüneburg, widow of Count Burkhard of Mansfeld (died 1389/1390) and Duke Bogislaw VI of Pomerania (died 1393), while his son Erik married Sophie, the daughter of Duke Bogislaw. Albert and Agnes had a son:

1. Albert V of Mecklenburg (died 1423), Duke of Mecklenburg and Schwerin

Queen Agnes died in 1430/1434.

== Bibliography ==
=== In English ===
- Demitz, Jacob Truedson (2020). Centuries of Selfies: Portraits commissioned by Swedish kings and queens. Preface by Ulf Sundberg. Stockholm; New York: Vulkan Förlag. pp. 28–29, 110, 151–152, 169 & 191. ISBN 978-91-89179-63-9.
- Helle, Knut, ed. (2008). The Cambridge History of Scandinavia, Vol. 1 : Prehistory to 1520. Cambridge: Cambridge University Press. ISBN 978-0-521-47299-9.
- Jones, Michael, ed. (2000). The New Cambridge Medieval History: c.1300-1415. Vol. VI. Cambridge University Press.

=== In other languages ===
- Carlsson, Sten; Rosén, Jerker, eds. (1993). Den svenska historien (in Swedish). Stockholm: Bonnier lexikon. pp. 74–83. ISBN 91-632-0003-1.
- Hagen, Ellen (1953). Margareta – Nordens drottning (in Swedish). Stockholm: Saxon & Lindströms förlag.
- Larsson, Lars-Olof (2003). Kalmarunionens tid (in Swedish) (2nd ed.). Stockholm: Prisma. ISBN 91-518-4217-3.
- Nordberg, Michael (1995). I kung Magnus tid (in Swedish). Stockholm: Norstedts. ISBN 978-91-1-952122-4.
- Nordman, Viljo Adolf (1938). "Albrecht, Herzog von Mecklenburg, König von Schweden". Annales Academiae Scientarium Fennicae, B (in German). XLIV. Helsinki, Finland: Suomalaisen Tiedeakatemian Toimituksia (Finnish Academy of Science and Letters). A good overall German source describing Albert's life.
- Röpcke, Andreas (2020). "Der vergessene Königssohn : Erinnerung an Herzog Erich von Mecklenburg, Prinz von Schweden, Herr von Gotland". Mecklenburgische Jahrbücher, 135. Jahrgang (in German). Vereins für mecklenburgische Geschichte und Altertumskunde e.V. pp. 25–34. doi:10.18453/rosdok_id00003675. ISSN 0930-8229.
- Kattinger, Detlef (2011). "Albrecht III.". In Röpcke, Andreas (ed.). Biographisches Lexikon für Mecklenburg. Band 6 (in German). Rostock: Schmidt-Römhild. ISBN 978-3-7950-3750-5.

Albert, King of Sweden House of Mecklenburg-Schwerin Cadet branch of the House of Mecklenburg Born: 1338 Died: 1 April 1412
Regnal titles
| Preceded by Magnus Eriksson; Haakon Magnusson | King of Sweden; 1364–1389 | Succeeded by Margaret |
| Preceded by Magnus I | Duke of Mecklenburg-Schwerin; 1384–1412 | Succeeded by Albert V |
