= Georg Busolt =

German classical historian (1850–1920)

Georg Busolt (13 November 1850 – 2 September 1920) was a German historian of Classical history.

Busolt, born at Gut Kepurren (now in Chernyakhovsky District) near Insterburg, was the son of the East Prussian landowner Adolf Julius Busolt (1818–1900). He attended the Gymnasium at Insterburg and studied history and philosophy at the University of Königsberg. In 1874 he received the Kant Prize for his dissertation Grundzüge der Erkenntnißtheorie und Metaphysik Spinozas ("The Foundation of Spinoza's Theory of Knowledge and Metaphysics"), for which he received his doctorate in the following year. Following a research tour of Italy and Greece, Busolt habilitated in 1878 at Königsberg with his work on Sparta.

Busolt received his first chair in 1879: He followed Christian August Volquardsen as Professor of Ancient History at the University of Kiel. Since this was Busolt's first post, at first he was an associate professor and became a full professor in 1881. After 18 years in Kiel Busolt changed for the winter semester 1897/98 at the University of Göttingen, where he again succeeded Volquardsen. In Göttingen, Busolt worked until his death in teaching and at research. The Prussian government appointed him to Privy Councillor in 1911. Busolt died at Göttingen in 1920.

Busolt dealt mainly with Greek history. To this end, he wrote a handbook on the ancient Greek city and his multi-volume Griechische Geschichte. Although he intended to cover the subject down to the Battle of Chaeroneia, Busolt's work goes only as far as the Peloponnesian War. Despite that his work has sometimes become outdated, it still occupies an important place in the secondary literature, especially for the time of the Peloponnesian War, due to his extremely extensive annotations, which cover all the primary sources then known and the secondary literature up to his time.

Busolt’s second major work is a handbook on the political and legal history of ancient Greece, published as part of the Handbuch der Altertumswissenschaft (Handbook of Classical Studies). Initially, Busolt’s contribution formed the first part of the volume Die griechischen Staats-, Kriegs- und Privataltertümer (Greek State, Military, and Private Antiquities), published in 1887. The second, expanded edition of Busolt’s text appeared in 1892 as a standalone book titled Die griechischen Staats- und Rechtsaltertümer (Greek State and Legal Antiquities). The third edition was fundamentally revised—expanding to two volumes totaling over 1,600 pages—and was published under the title Griechische Staatskunde (Greek Political Institutions) in 1920 and 1926. The second volume of this new edition was completed and prepared for publication by Heinrich Swoboda following Busolt’s death.

== Selected writings ==
- Der zweite athenische Bund und die auf der Autonomie beruhende, hellenische Politik von der Schlacht bei Knidos bis zum Frieden des Eubulos. ("The second Athenian League and the autonomy based Hellenic policy from the Battle of Cnidus to the Peace of Eubulus") Teubner, Leipzig, 1874.
- Die Grundzüge der Erkenntnißtheorie und Methaphysik Spinozas. Berlin, 1875.
- Die Lakedaimonier und ihre Bundesgenossen. ("The Lacedaemonians and their Federation") Teubner, Leipzig 1878.
- Forschungen zur Griechischen Geschichte. ("Studies on Greek history") Breslau, 1880.
- Griechische Geschichte bis zur Schlacht bei Chaeroneia. 3 Bände in 4. Perthes, Gotha 1885–1904 (teilweise in 2. Auflage; reicht nur bis zum Ende des Peloponnesischen Krieges).
- Die griechischen Staats-, Kriegs- und Privataltertümer. Nördlingen: Beck, 1887.
- 3. Auflage unter dem Titel: Griechische Staatskunde. 1. Hauptteil: Allgemeine Darstellung des griechischen Staates. München: Beck, 1920; reprinted 1979, ISBN 3-406-01360-0. (Handbuch des klassischen Altertumswissenschaft, 4. Abt., Teil 1, 1. Bd.).
- Griechische Staatskunde. 2. Hauptteil: Darstellung einzelner Staaten und der zwischenstaatlichen Beziehungen. München: Beck, 1926; reprinted 1979, ISBN 3-406-01360-0. (Handbuch des klassischen Altertumswissenschaft, 4. Abt., Teil 1, 2. Bd.)

== Sources ==
- Friedrich Volbehr and Richard Weyl, Professoren und Dozenten der Christian-Albrechts-Universität zu Kiel 1665–1915. Kiel: Schmidt & Klaunig, 1916, p. 114.
- Jochen Bleicken, "Die Herausbildung der Alten Geschichte in Göttingen. Von Heyne bis Busolt," Carl Joachim Classen (ed.): Die klassische Altertumswissenschaft an der Georg-August-Universität Göttingen. Eine Ringvorlesung zu ihrer Geschichte. Göttingen : Vandenhoeck u. Ruprecht, 1989, pp. 98–127, ISBN 3-525-35845-8.
- Mortimer H. Chambers, Georg Busolt. His career in his letters. Leiden: Brill, 1990, ISBN 90-04-09225-0.
