= Georg Jensen Damask =

Georg Jensen Damask is a manufacturer of home textiles based in Kolding, Denmark. The company was founded in 1756. In 1992, it was appointed as purveyor to the Court of Denmark.

== History ==
The company traces its history back to the 16th century but was officially founded in 1756 in Vonsild. In 1752, the weaver Andreas Jensen (1733–1805) married Kirsten Christensdatter (1740–1781), daughter of another local weaver.

Vævergården in Vonsild remained in the Jensen family for generations. In 1910, Georg Jensen (1885–1939) established a modern textile factory in Kolding. He collaborated with some of the leading Danish artists of the time, including Knud V. Engelhardt. In 1947, Jensen ceded the company to his son Bent Georg Jensens (1923–2014). He collaborated with artists such as John Becker and Bodil Bødtker-Næss.

In 1992, Georg Jensen Damask was appointed as purveyor to the Court of Denmark. Bent Georg Jensen sold the company in 1999.

== Designers ==
Georg Jensen Damask has collaborated with designers such as John Becker, Bodil Bødtker-Næss, Knud V. Engelhardt, Arne Jacobsen, Nina Ferlov, Grethe Sørensen, Bent Georg Jensen, Vibeke Klint, Kim Naver and Jette Nevers This has been an important source of interest for Nevers for a considerable time. In 1997, she created textiles for the decoration of Haderslev Cathedral.

== Awards ==
The company has received a number of design awards, including the ID-klassikerprisen Award 1994.
