= Hercules von Oberberg =

Dutch-Danish Renaissance architect

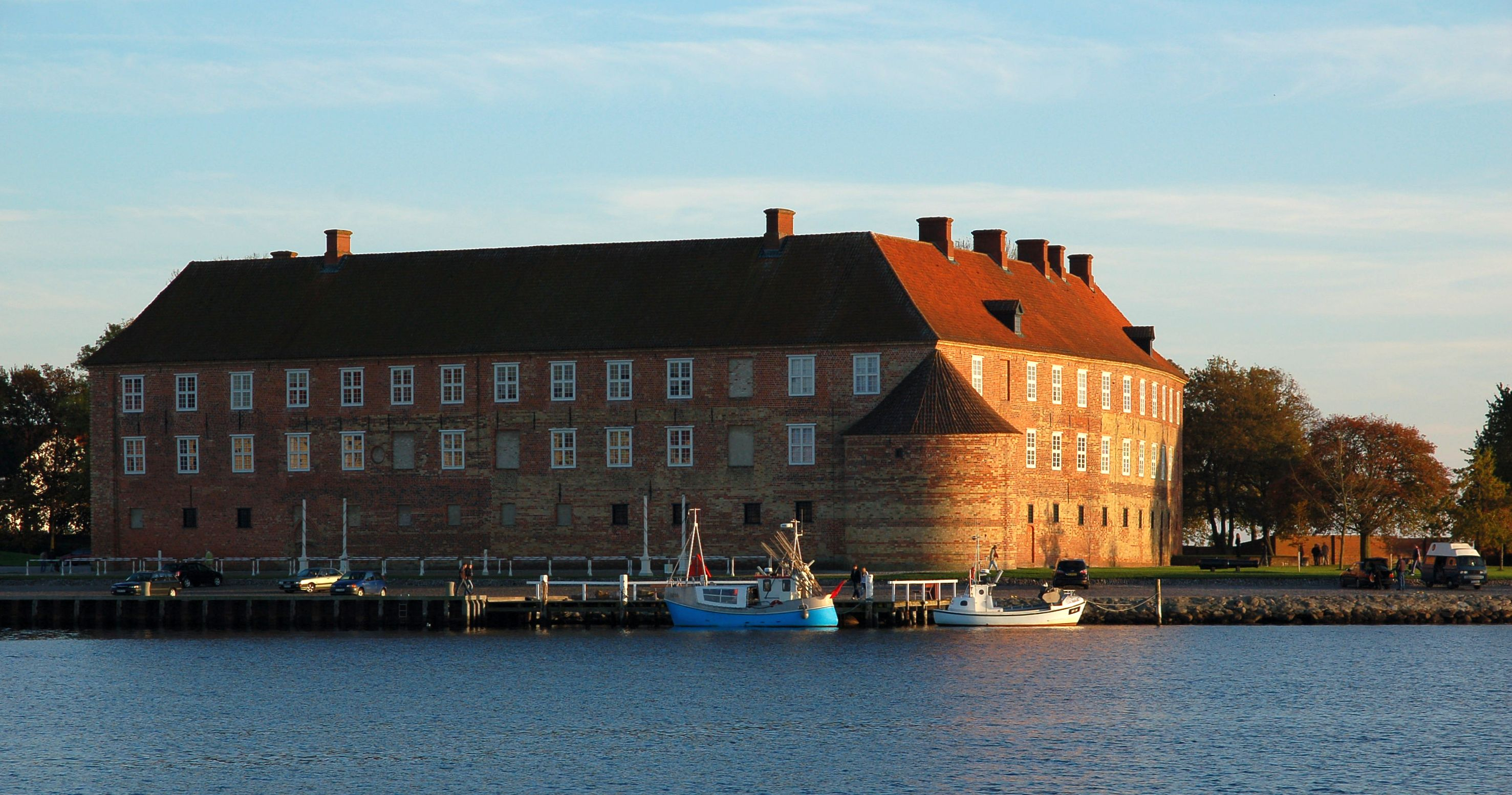
Sønderborg Castle, in Sønderborg, Denmark

Hercules von Oberberg (1517–1602) was a Dutch-Danish Renaissance architect. He was mainly active in the Duchy of Schleswig.

== Biography ==
In his early years Hercules von Oberberg worked for Johann of Brandenburg-Küstrin but on 17 July 1557 he became Royal Building Master, succeeding Martin Bussert, but he only stayed in the position for two years. During that time he worked on Copenhagen Castle and Koldinghus (minor renovations), Sønderborg Castle (planning and commenced rebuilding), the Fortifications of Copenhagen and Krogen (the bastioned fortifications).

On 29 August 1559 he was employed by Duke Hans the Elder in Haderslev where he stayed until his death. In 1559-60 he directed the extension of Hansborg with two new wings and a tower. During Duke Hans' last years he was also responsible for the reconstruction and fortification of Tønderhus. In 1591 he worked on Gottorf Castle, where he is credited for the gables of the northern wing.

In 1598 Christian IV charged von Oberberg, by then an oldman, with the huge tower and castle church at Koldinghus.

== Aftermath ==
Introduced the Floris style in Denmark, seen today at Sønderborg Castle, which he transformed from a medieval fortress into a Renaissance castle for Christian III. The style is particularly characteristic of the castle church. It was also seen in the gables of Sønderborg Castle and Gottorp Castle's northwing as well as those of Tønderhus and Tønning Palace. As a military architect von Oberberg was fairly old-fashioned, relying mainly on Direr's theories.
