= Jette Nevers =

Jette Lykke Nevers (born 1943) is a Danish weaver and textile artist. She is best known for the works she has created for Danish churches, including altar frontals, chancel carpets and chasubles. Nevers has also produced designs for companies including Georg Jensen Damask and Kvadrat. As a result of her widely exhibited creations at home and abroad, as well as the many students she has trained, Nevers has been a major influence in the development of Danish textile art.

== Early life and family ==
Born in Copenhagen on 17 May 1943, Jette Lykke Nevers was the daughter of the utility worker Carl Ove Peder Nevers and his wife Rosa Ingeborg Kirstine née Hansen, a cashier. While studying textile art at Copenhagen's Arts and Crafts School (1961–65), she gained practical experience with Sofie Anker, Bornholm, and Søs and Ib Drasbæk, Funen. In 1966, she married the smith Henrik Warding Hansen (later changed name to Nevers).

== Career ==
In 1965, Nevers established her own workshop where she created shawls and ponchos in natural colours. In the early 1970s, she experimented with a number of different weaving techniques and was commissioned to create pictorial carpets. Nevers was inspired early on by the free style of the textile artists Franka Rasmussen and John Kristian Becker (1915–86). She received commissions from Danish churches for creating altar frontals, chancel carpets and chasubles, combining weaving, embroidery and print. This has been an important source of interest for Nevers for a considerable time. In 1997, she created textiles for the decoration of Haderslev Cathedral.

From 1978, Nevers embarked on a long-lasting collaboration with Georg Jensen Damask in Kolding, above all designing tablecloths for commercial production. She has also created patterns for furniture textiles for the design company Kvadrat.

Throughout her career, Never has travelled widely either to experience different weaving techniques or to exhibit her creations. In the 1970s, she visited Norway and Scotland, in the 1980s, the United States, China and France, and England in the 1990s. She has also been active in various organizations, including the Danish arts and crafts council Kunsthåndværkerrådet (1978–88), World Crafts Council (1979–89), and the board of the Design School Kolding where she was earlier engaged as a teacher.
