= Sønderborg (disambiguation) =

Sønderborg may refer to:

- Sønderborg, Denmark
- Sønderborg Municipality
- Sønderborg Municipality (1970-2006)
- Sønderborg Castle
