= Grethe Sørensen =

Danish textile artist

Grethe Sørensen (born 1947) is a Danish textile artist. A pioneer in the field of digital weaving in which she combines traditional craftsmanship with technological innovation, in 2017 she received the Nordic Award in Textiles. Her works are held in the permanent collections of major design museums, including the Cooper Hewitt, Smithsonian Design Museum in New York and Designmuseum Danmark in Copenhagen.

== Biography ==
Born on 25 November, 1947 in Viborg, Grethe Sørensen is the daughter of the agronomist Søren Peter Sørensen (1906–1991) and Louise Andreasen (1908–1999). She was raised in a family with cultural interests together with her two elder brothers and sister. While still at school, she spent her summers at the nearby craftsmanship school, Skals Håndarbejdsskole, where she learnt to weave. After completing high school in 1968, she attended the Kolding School of Arts & Crafts until she graduated in 1973.

Together with her partner, the film director Bo Hovgaard Andreasen, she set up home in the old Bastrup school to the south of Viborg where she established a workshop with dyeing facilities and large looms. It was also in 1973 that she exhibited for the first time at the Charlottenborg Spring Exhibition, the first of many presentations. She was invited to teach at the Kolding School of Arts & Crafts, where she remained until 1977. She then completed her education in Switzerland and at the French tapestry enterprise, Manufacture Nationale des Gobelins, in Paris.

Experimenting with both two-dimensional and three-dimensional weaving techniques, she won the competition for decorating the Esbjerg teaching aids centre (Amtscentralen) in 1981. She increasingly made use of technology to adapt the loom to industrial production for firms such as Georg Jensen Damask. She has also produced textiles for decorating altarpieces in Danish churches including Nikolaj Church in Kolding and for various institutions such as Dronningens Ferieby in Grenå.

In 2017, Sørensen won the prestigious Nordic Award in Textiles from the Swedish foundation Stiftelsen Fokus Borås for her success in digital and traditional weaving. The jury commented on her work as a "pioneer in digital weaving technology... not just in Denmark but in Europe."
