= Haderslev RC =

Danish rugby club

- Full name: Haderslev Rugby Club
- Founded: 1991
- Location: Haderslev, Denmark
- Chairman: Alistair Rowan
- Coach: Ronnie Rowan
Team kit

Haderslev RC is a Danish rugby club in Haderslev. Though they are a standalone club, they often combine with other teams to play matches due to lack of player numbers.
