= Haderslev =

Haderslev Hadersleben (German)
- Town
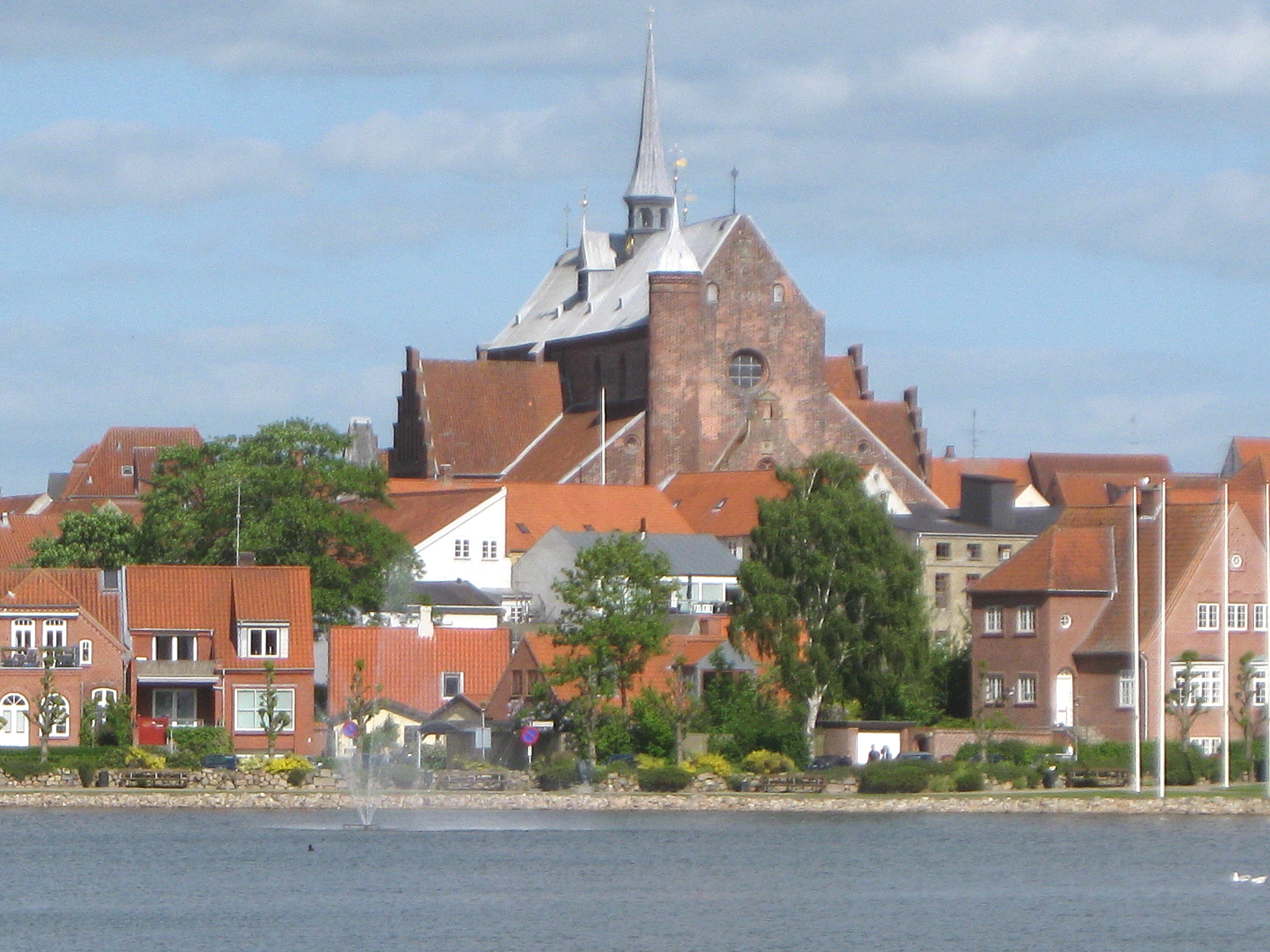
- Haderslev Cathedral seen from the inner lake

- Coat of arms

- Haderslev (lower left) is southeast of Esbjerg and north of Sønderborg, on Denmark's Jutland peninsula. Haderslev (Region of Southern Denmark)
- Coordinates: 55°14′34″N 9°31′30″E
- Country: Denmark
- Region: Southern Denmark (Syddanmark)
- Municipality: Haderslev
- First documented: 1050

Government
  - Mayor: Mads Skau

Area
  - Urban: 12.2 km^{2} (4.7 sq mi)
- Elevation: 10 m (33 ft)

Population (2026)
  - Urban: 22,320
  - Urban density: 1,830/km^{2} (4,740/sq mi)
  - Gender: 10,875 males and 11,445 females
- Demonym: Haderslever
- Time zone: UTC+1 (CET)
  - Summer (DST): UTC+2 (CEST)
- Postal code: 6100
- Area code: (+45) 7
- Native languages: Danish
- Website: haderslev.dk

Haderslev (Danish pronunciation: [ˈhæðˀɐˌsle̝w]; German: Hadersleben [ˈhaːdɐsleːbm̩]) is a Danish town in the Region of Southern Denmark with a population of 22,320 (1 January 2026). It is the main town and the administrative seat of Haderslev Municipality and is situated in the eastern part of Southern Jutland. Haderslev is home of Sønderjyske, which is an association football team that plays in the Danish Superliga since 2008. The town is named after King Hader.

== History ==
=== Overview ===
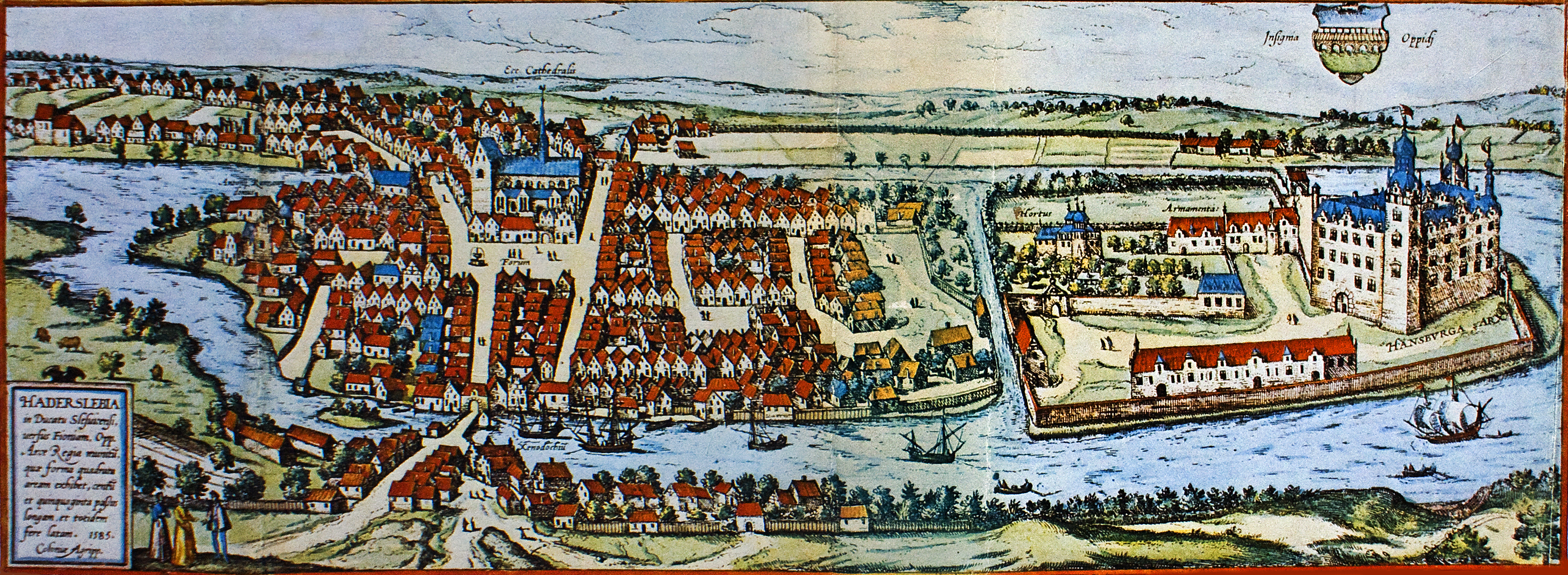
Haderslev in the 16th century

Haderslev is situated in a valley, leading from Vojens to Haderslev Fjord and the Baltic Sea. Haderslev was presumably founded by Vikings at least a century before it was granted status as royal borough in 1292. At that time, it had become one of the main trading centres in Southern Jutland. In 1327, Haderslevhus, the royal castle, was mentioned for the first time. It was situated east of the cathedral, in an area still called Slotsgrunden. In the following centuries the city prospered, building both the Gothic Cathedral and the second castle of Hansborg (burnt in 1644), which was similar to Kronborg. Due to the plague in Copenhagen, King Christian IV was married there. In the 16th century, the city became one of the first Scandinavian centres of Lutheranism during the Reformation. Prior to the Second Schleswig War of 1864, Haderslev was situated in the Duchy of Schleswig, a Danish fief, so its history is properly included in the contentious history of Schleswig-Holstein. From 1864 it was part of Prussia, and as such part of the North German Confederation, and from 1871 onwards, part of the German Empire. In the 1920 Schleswig Plebiscite that returned Northern Schleswig to Denmark, 38.6% of Haderslev's inhabitants voted for remaining part of Germany and 61.4% voted for the cession to Denmark. It was formerly the capital of the German Kreis Hadersleben and the Danish Haderslev County.

=== Buildings in Haderslev ===
The trademark of Haderslev is unquestionably Haderslev Cathedral, which has existed since the middle of the 13th century, and since 1922 it was the seat of Haderslev Diocese. The town was an important breeding ground for the reformation in Denmark, and as early as 1526 Christian introduced, as the duke of Schleswig-Holstein, the reformation in Haderslev, just eight years before he became King of Denmark.

Another noticeable church is the white-chalked Sankt Severin Church, which lies at the banks of the town's inner pond.

Because of a renovation of the town's oldest houses, it means Haderslev offers a unique collection of houses and buildings from 1400 to the beginning of the 20th century, and the town center's cobbled streets and alleys is very suitable for town strolling.

Once the town used to have a castle named "Haderslevhus", but due to several town fires through the town's history the castle is no longer existent.

=== Festival ===
In the public park "Kløften", near the town's center, Kløften Festival is held - a three-day annual festival in the summer. The festival uses one of Haderslev's important trademarks, the red-bricked water tower near the park as its logo.

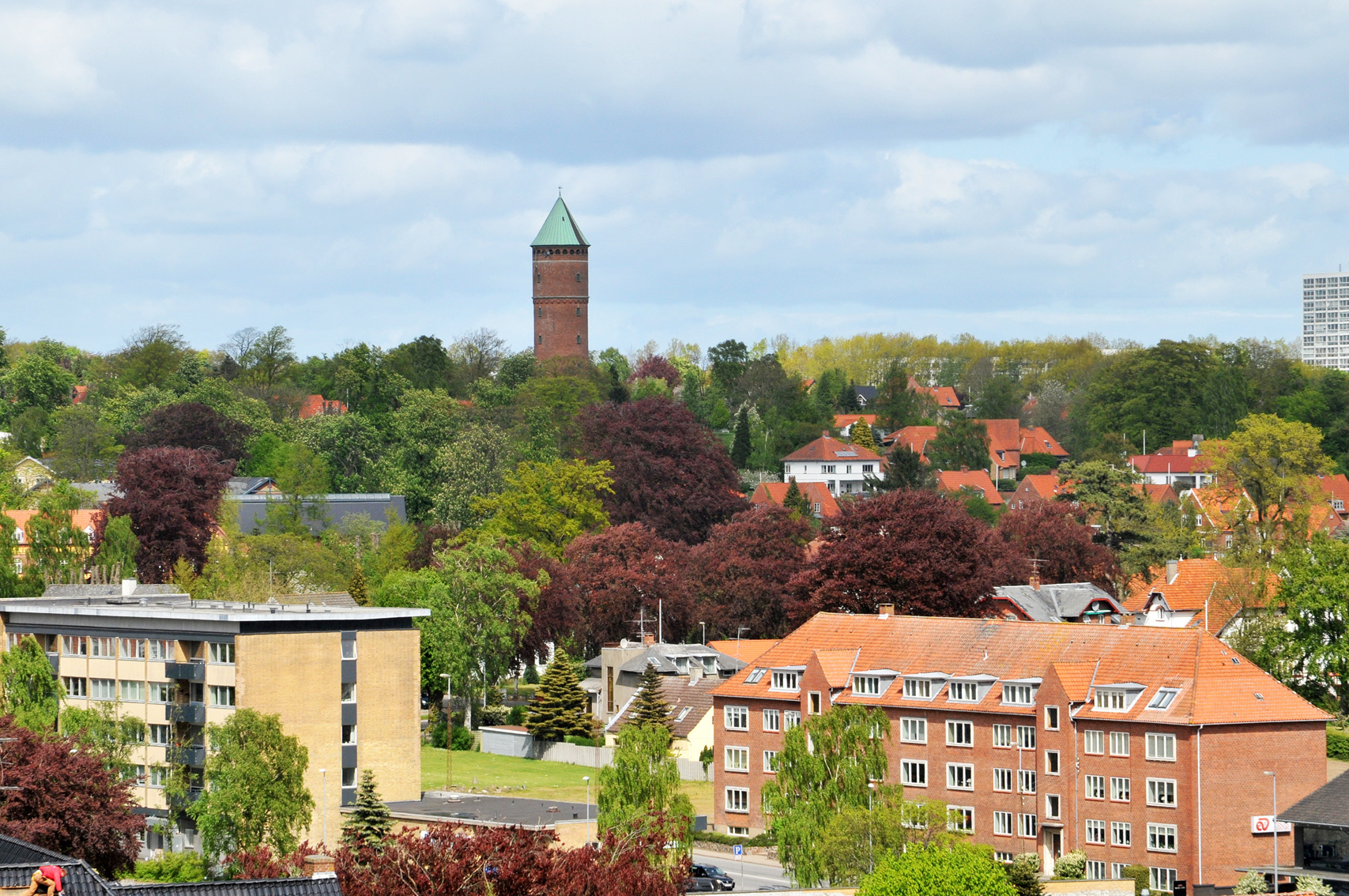
Kløften Festival's trademark, the red water tower, is visible from many places in the town foto:Mogens Nielsen

=== Education in Haderslev ===
Three branches of University College South (Danish: University College Syd) can be found in Haderslev.

=== Former municipality (1970–2006) ===
A kommune by the previous name existed 1970–2006. It belonged to South Jutland County and covered an area of 272 square kilometres (105 sq mi) with a total population of 56,116 (2011). Its last mayor was Hans Peter Geil, a member of the liberal (Venstre) political party.

Neighboring municipalities were Christiansfeld to the north, Vojens to the west, Rødekro to the south, and Assens (on the island of Funen) to the East.

== Twin towns – sister cities ==
Haderslev practices twinning on the municipal level. For the twin towns, see twin towns of Haderslev Municipality.

== Notable residents ==
=== Nobility ===
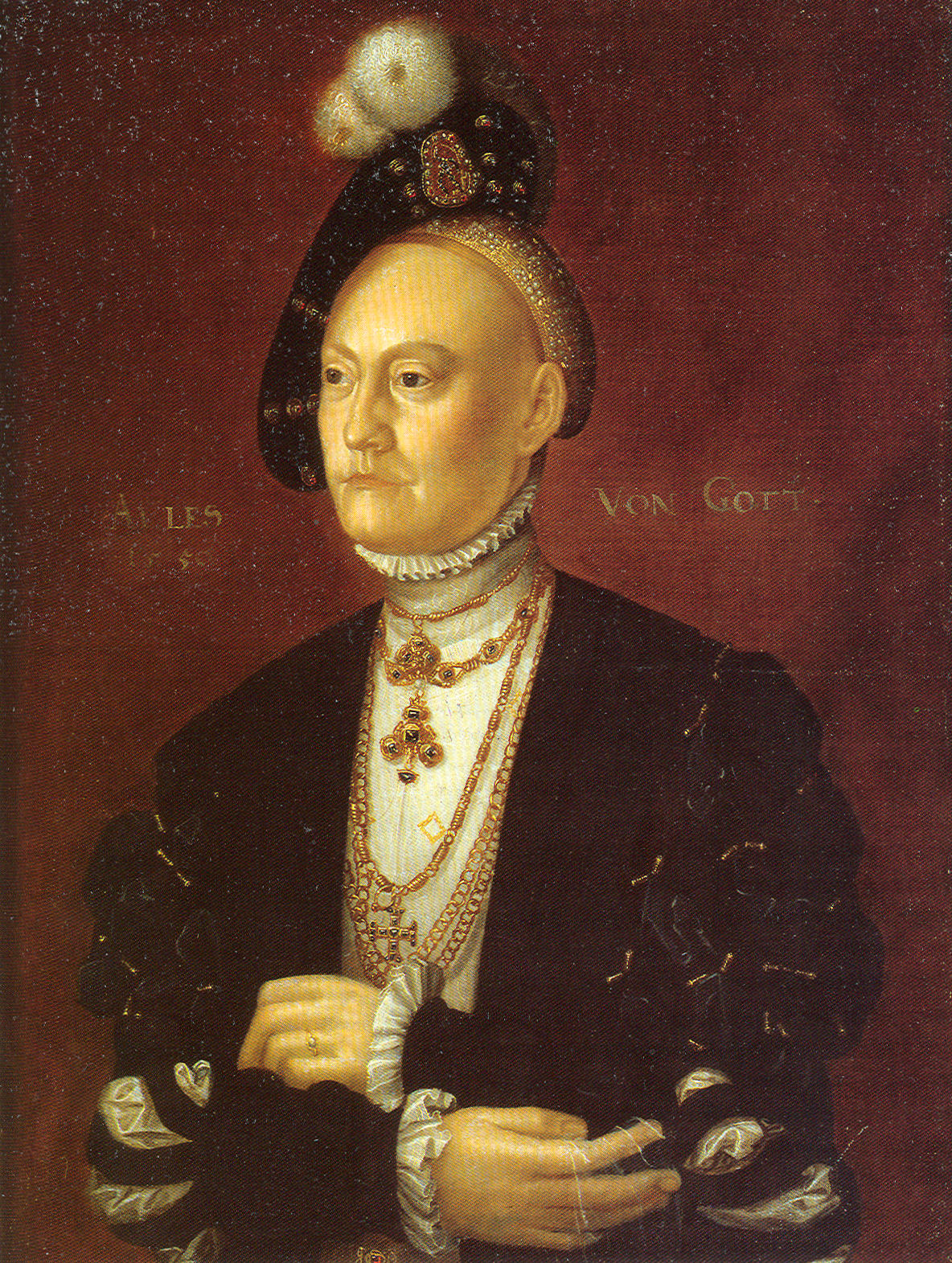
Queen Dorothea

- Eric Christoffersen of Denmark (c. 1307–c. 1332) King of Denmark from 1321, in 1325 he sought to halt the Counts of Holstein, but was deserted by his troops and confined in Haderslev Castle
- Dorothea of Saxe-Lauenburg (1511–1571), consort of Christian III from 1525 and Queen consort of Denmark and Norway. Lived in her own courts in Haderslev.
- John II, Duke of Schleswig-Holstein-Haderslev (1521–1580) was the only Duke of Schleswig-Holstein-Haderslev
- Frederick II of Denmark (1534–1588) King of Denmark and Norway and Duke of Schleswig and Holstein from 1559 until his death.
- John II, Duke of Schleswig-Holstein-Sonderburg (1545–1622) was the Duke of Schleswig-Holstein-Sonderburg
- Frederick III of Denmark (1609–1670) king of Denmark and Norway 1648–1670.

=== The Arts ===
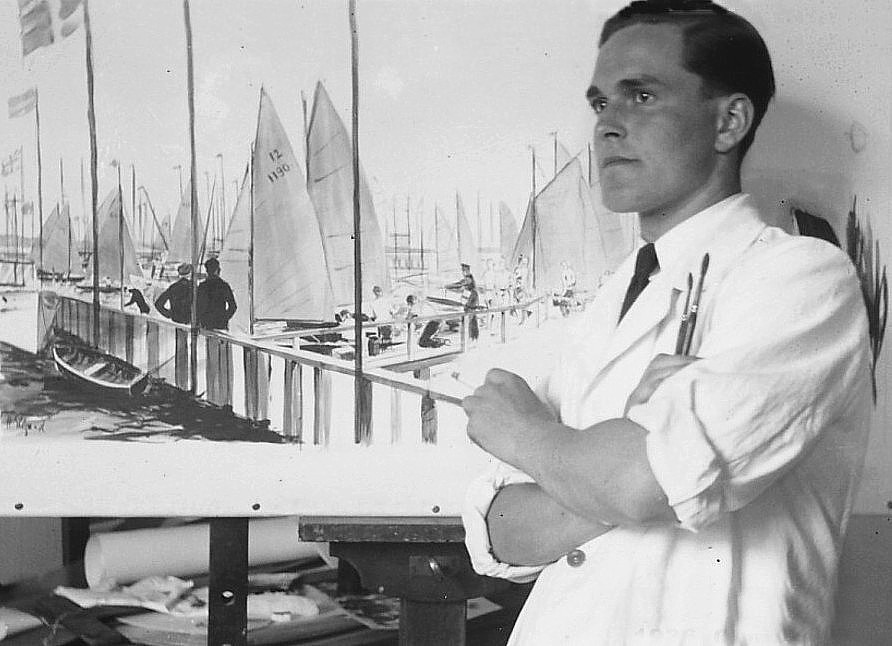
Helmuth Ellgaard, 1936

- Georg Nikolaus von Nissen (1761 in Haderslev–1826) music historian and diplomat, author of one of the first biographies of Wolfgang Amadeus Mozart
- Heinrich Hansen (born 1821 Haderslev–1890) was an architectural painter and State Councillor
- Anton Eduard Kieldrup (1826 in Haderslev–1869) was a Danish landscape painter
- Friedrich Deneken (1857 in Hadersleben–1927) a German art historian and museum director
- Ole Kruse (1868 in Haderslev–1948) a Danish-Swedish painter
- Hans Lynge (1906–1988 in Haderslev) a Greenlandic author, painter, politician and sculptor
- Helmuth Ellgaard (1913–1980) was a German illustrator, artist and journalist
- Torben Ebbesen (born 1945) a Danish sculptor and painter

=== Public thinking & Public Service ===
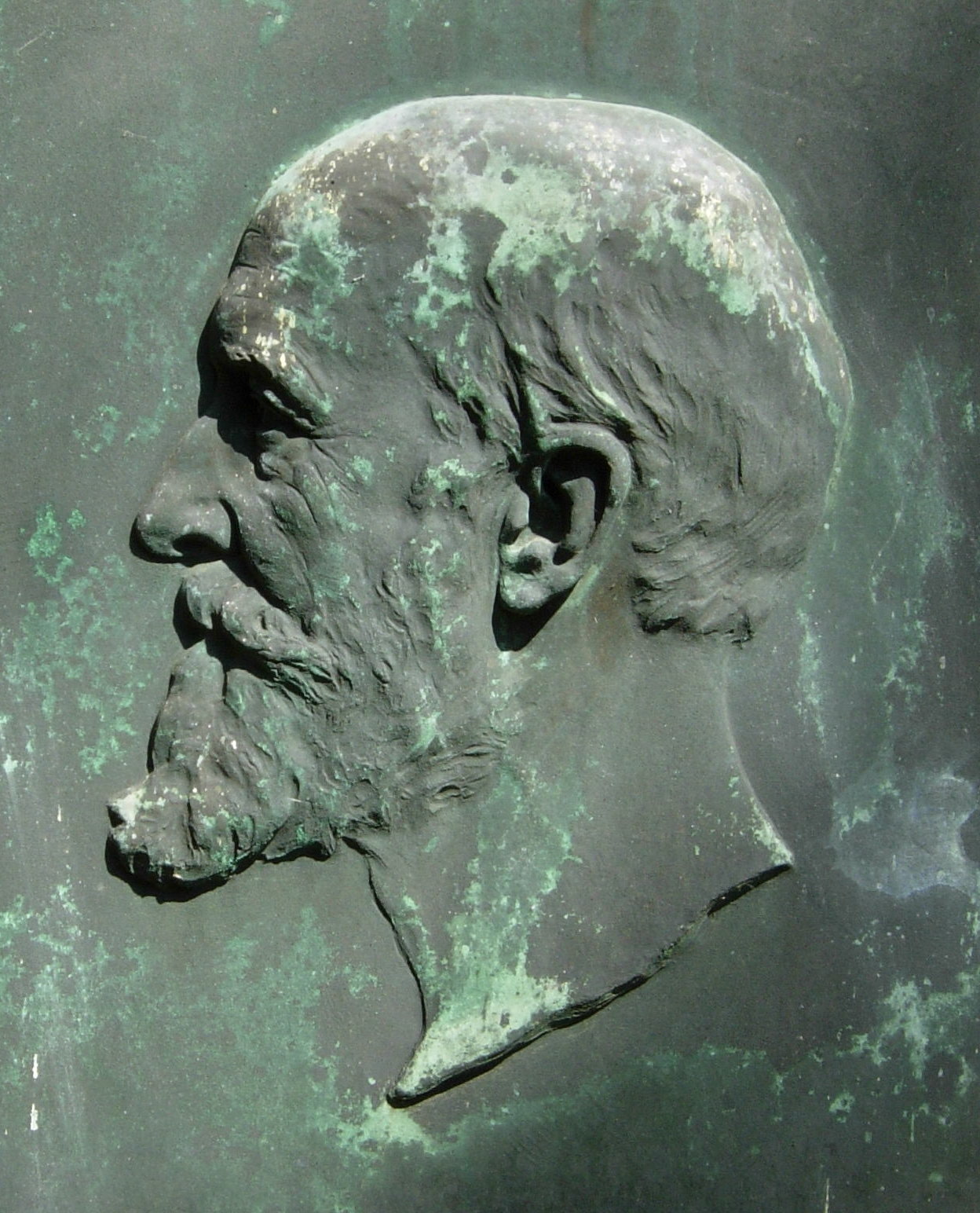
Heinrich Nissen, 1912

- Niels Toller (1592–1642) merchant, settled in Norway, the wealthiest person in Christiania
- Henning Stockfleth (c. 1610–1664) was a Norwegian cleric and Bishop of Oslo
- Arend Friedrich Wiegmann (1770–1853) was a German pharmacist and botanist
- Heinrich Nissen (born 1839 in Hadersleben–1912) was a German professor of ancient history
- Christian August Volquardsen (born 1840 in Hadersleben–1917) was a German historian.
- Julius Langbehn (1851–1907) was a German art historian and philosopher.
- Günter Weitling (born 1935) a Lutheran theologian, historian, and author
- Marianne Christiansen (born 1963) is a Lutheran bishop of the Diocese of Haderslev
- Erik Jorgensen (1921–2012) was a forester, professor, and inventor of "urban forestry"

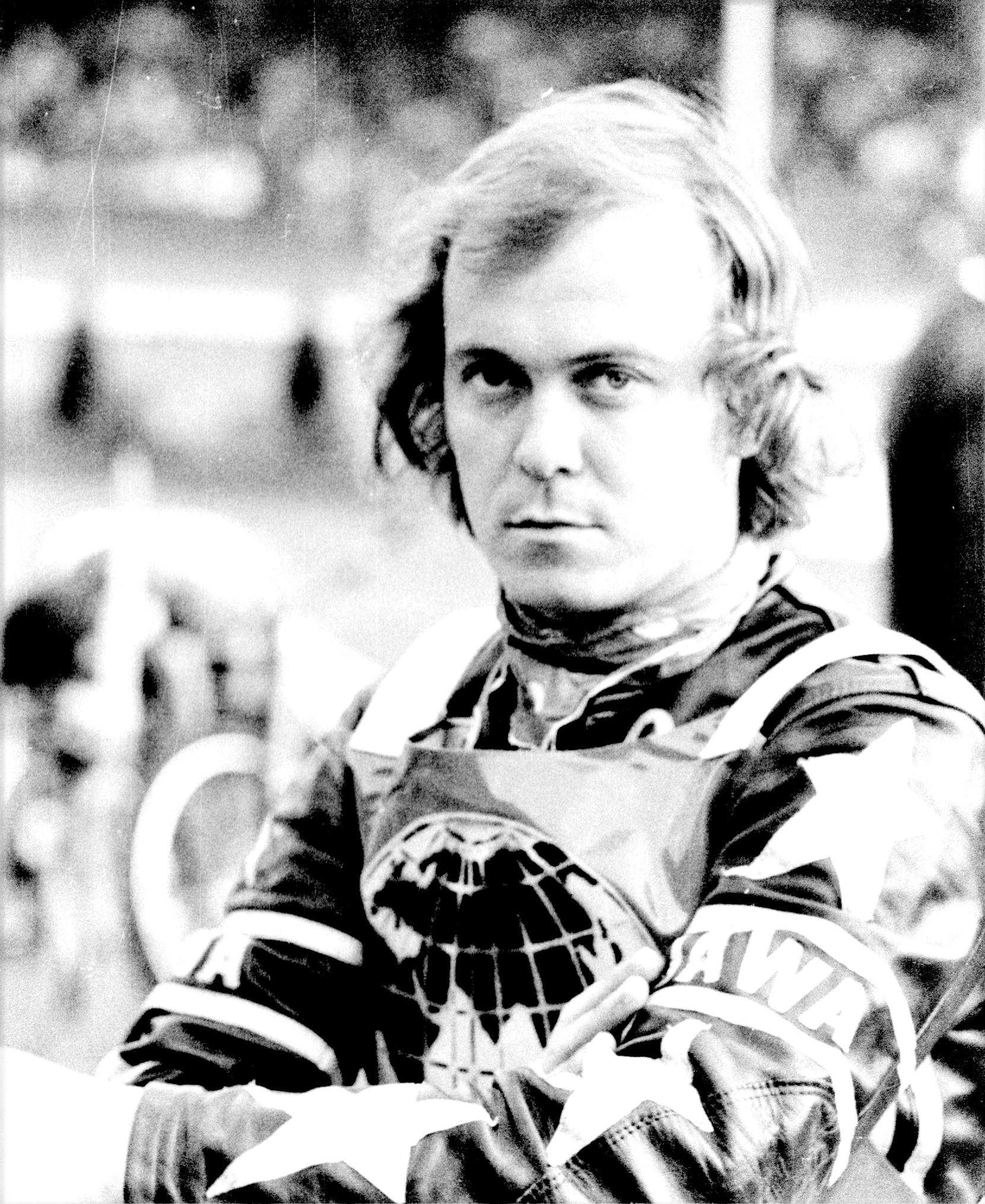
Ole Olsen, 2009

=== Sport ===
- Svend Wad (1928–2004) boxer, the Olympic Bronze Medalist at lightweight in London in 1948
- Jørn Krab (born 1945) a Danish rower who competed in the 1968 Summer Olympics
- Ole Olsen (born 1946) a Danish former international motorcycle speedway rider
- Preben Krab (born 1952) a Danish rower who competed in the 1968 Summer Olympics
- Finn Jensen (born 1957) is a Danish former motorcycle speedway rider
- Patrick Galbraith (born 1986) a Danish professional ice hockey goaltender
- Klaus Thomsen, (born 1986) a Danish handball player who won the Danish championship in 2016

== Sports ==
- Haderslev RC, rugby club
- Sønderjyske Fodbold, association football club

== Gallery ==
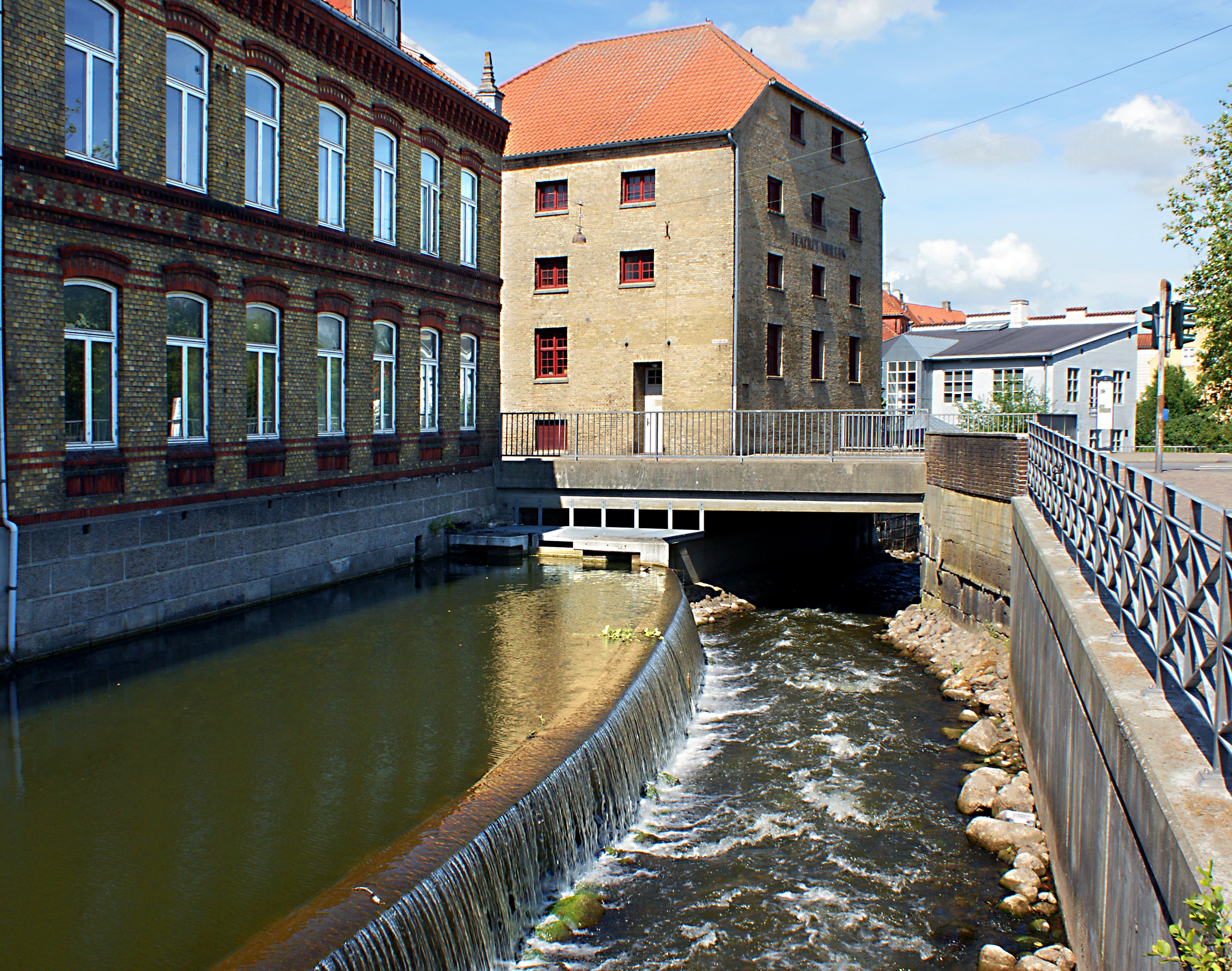
Slotsvandmøllen

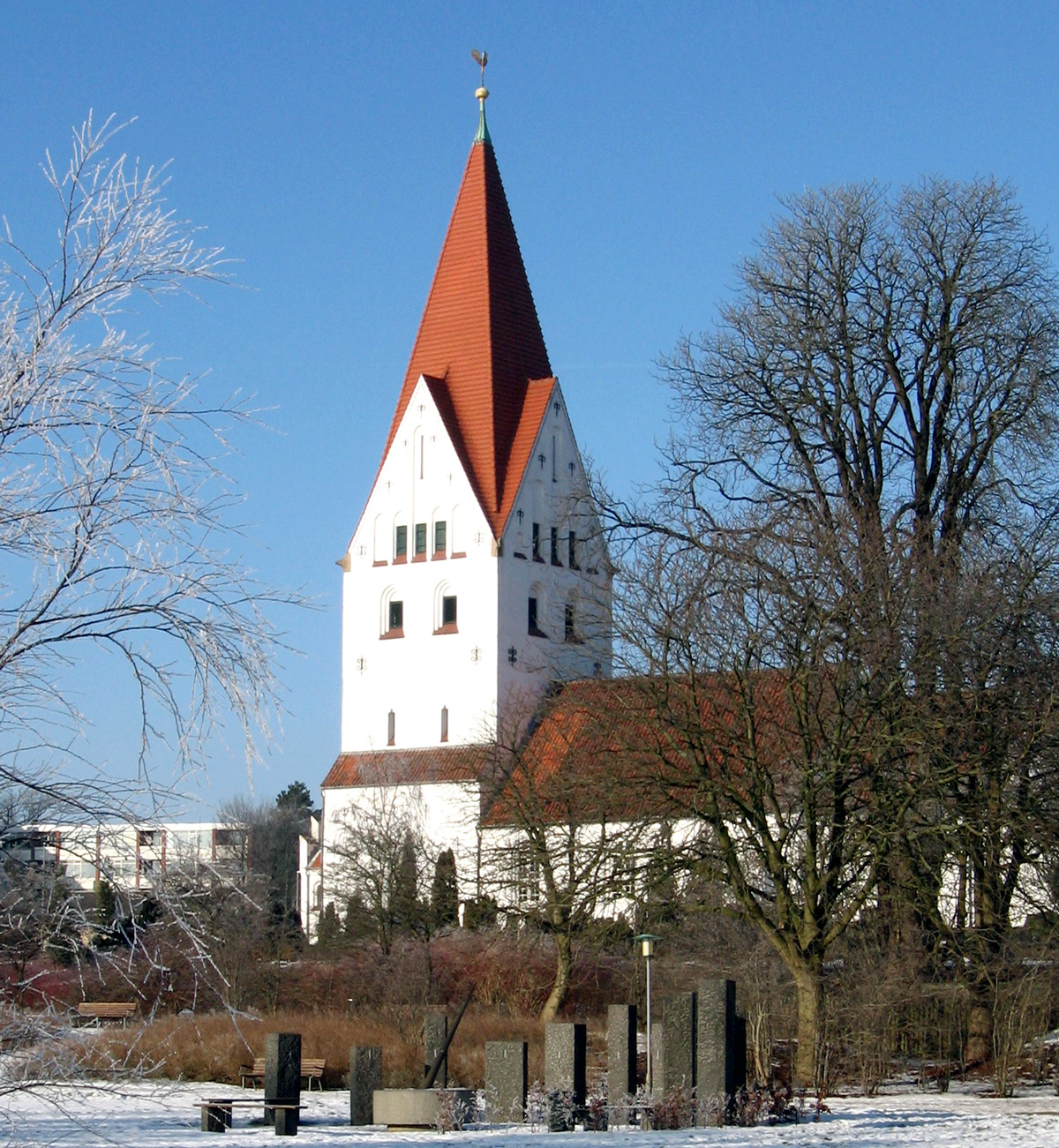
Sankt Severin Kirke

The front of Hertug Hans Hospital Church

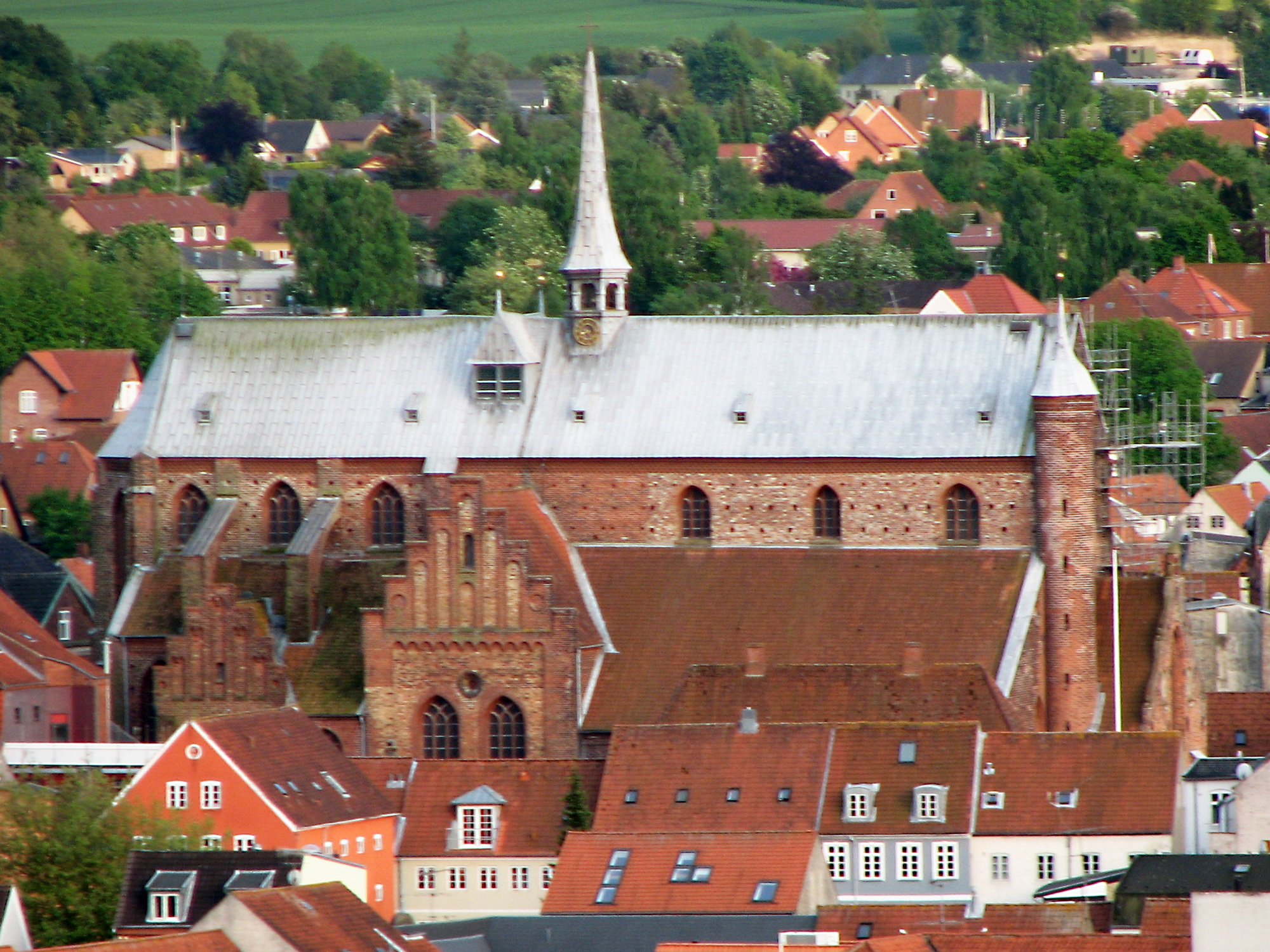
Domkirken seen from north

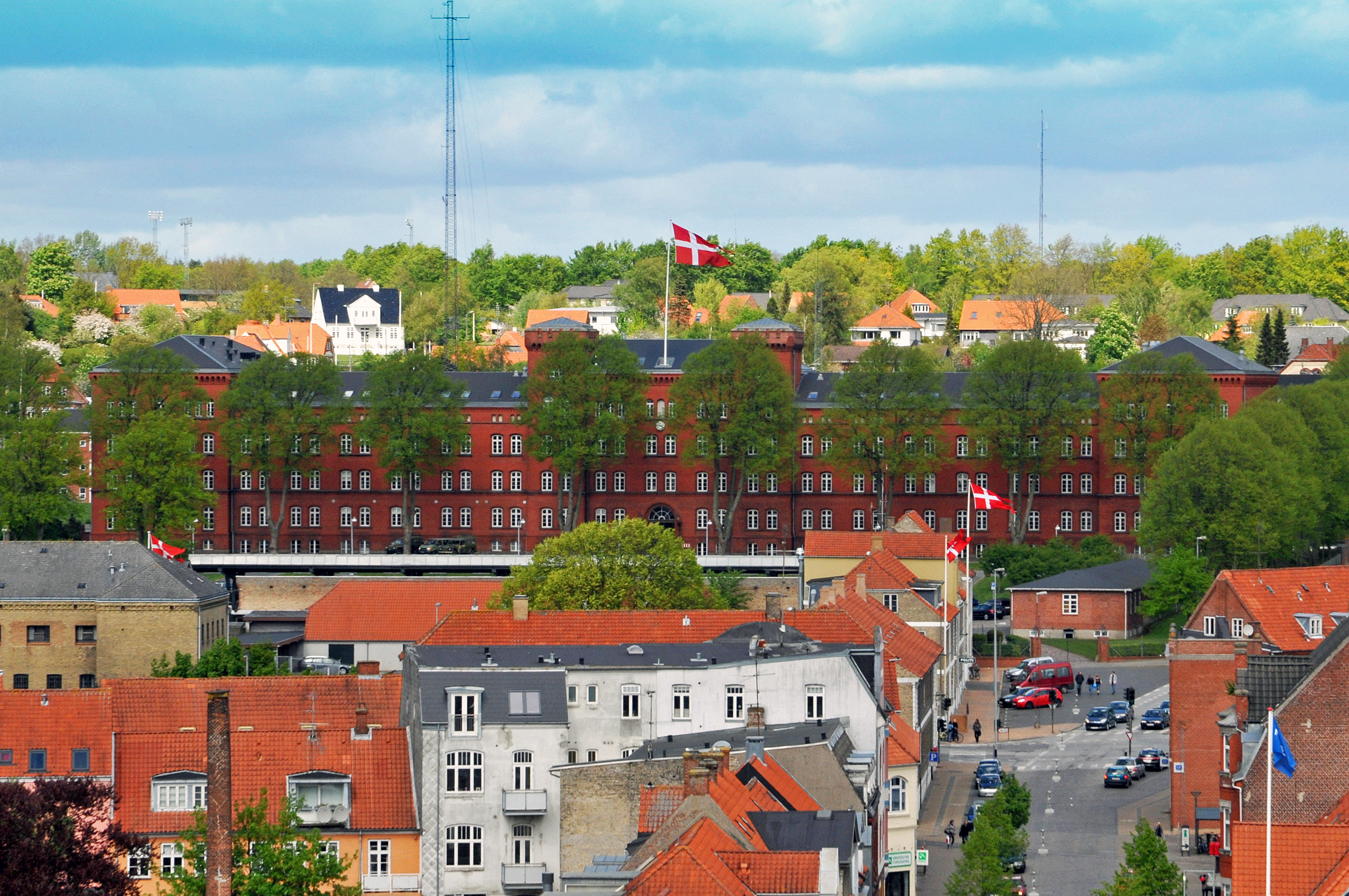
Haderslev garrison

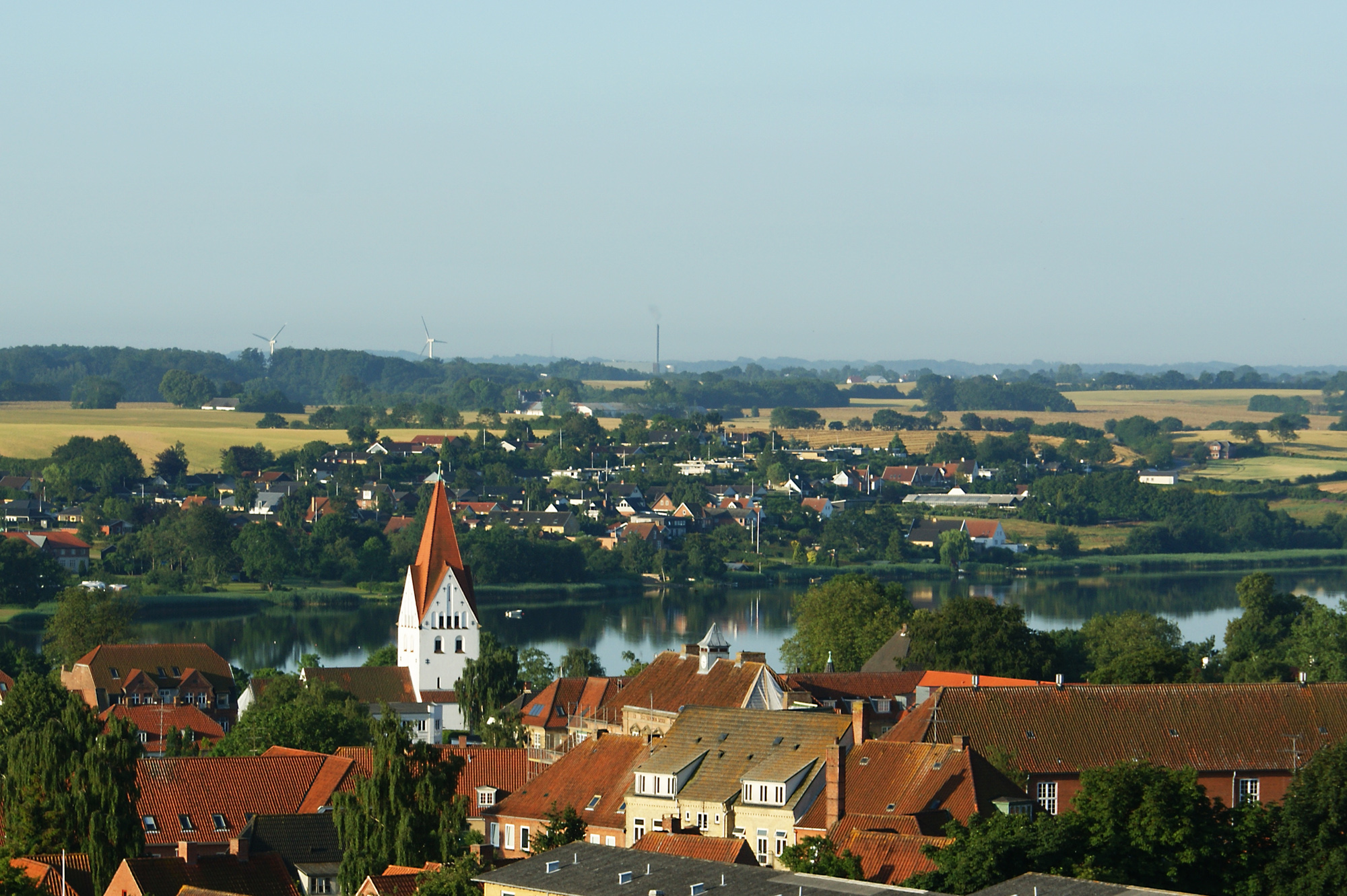
A view over Haderslev lake

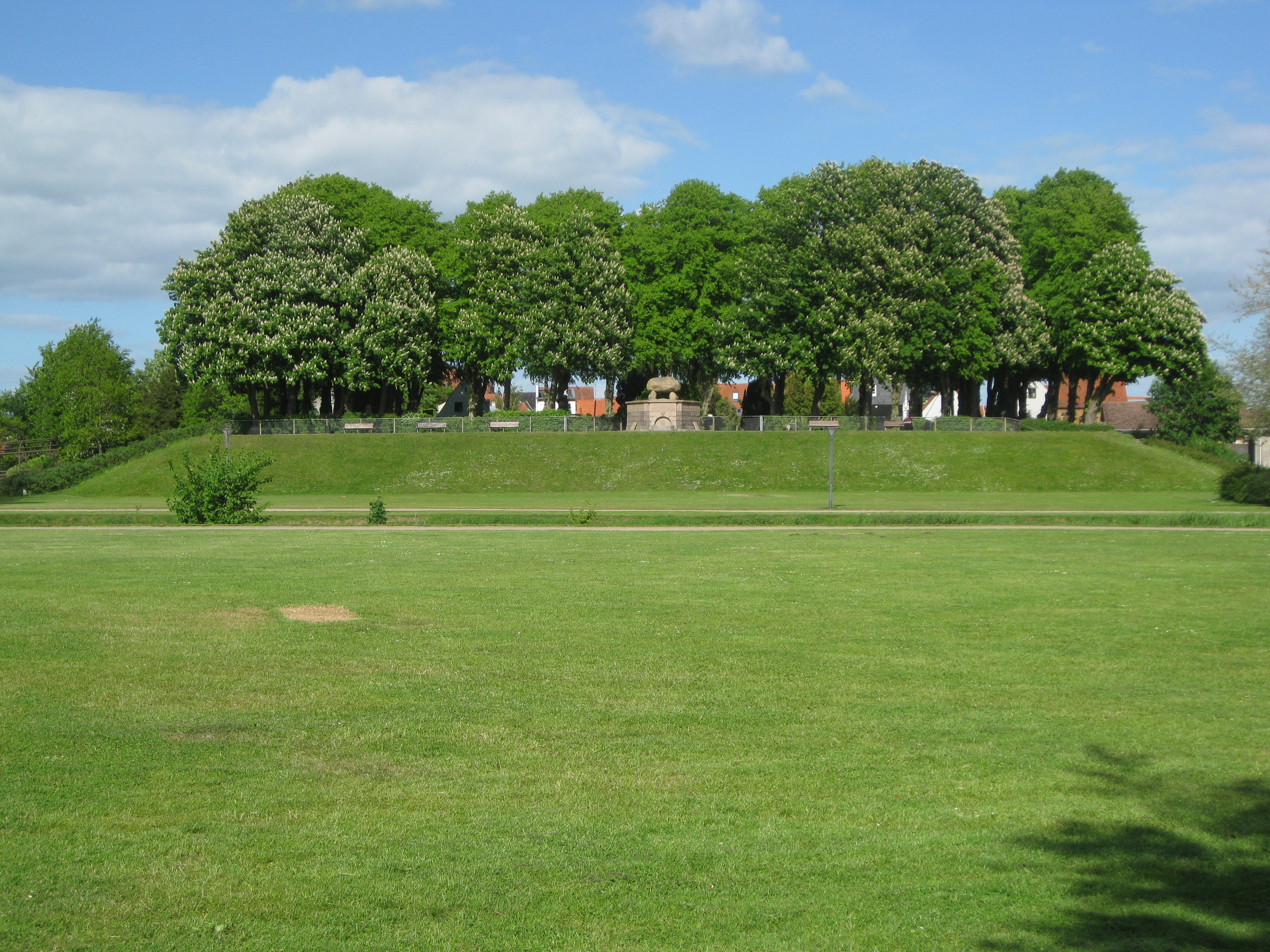
Monument in Haderslev Park

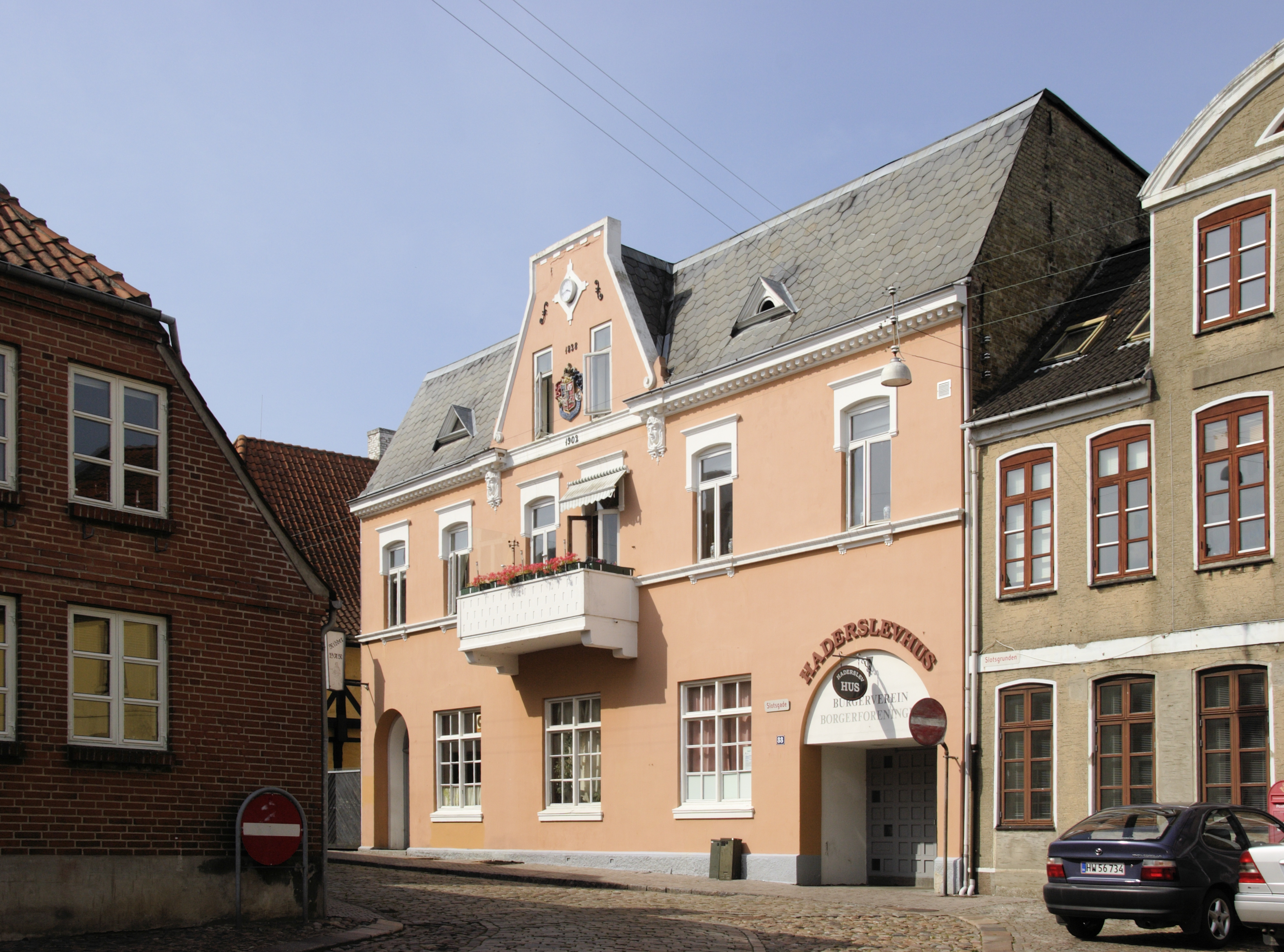
Haderslevhus

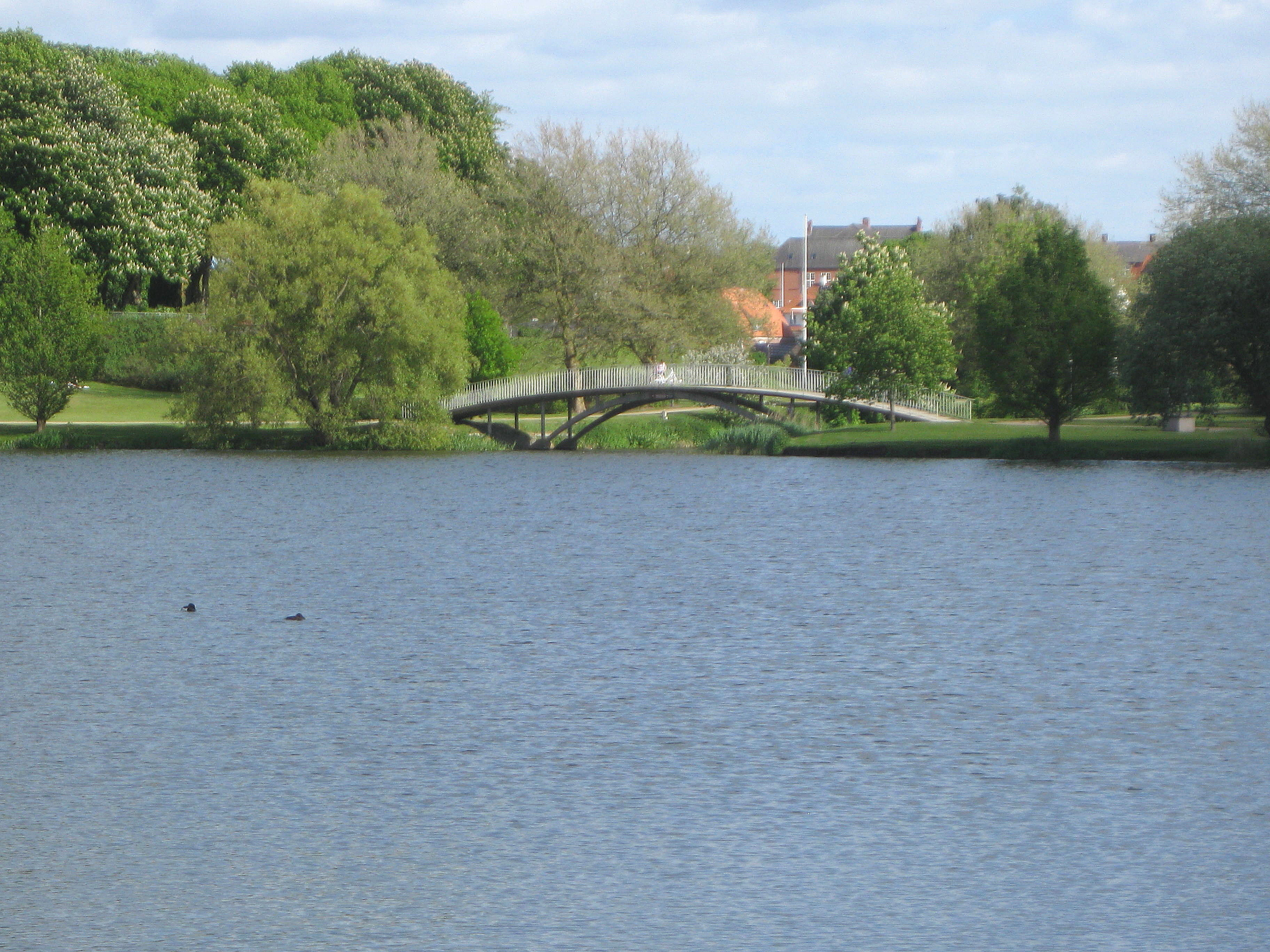
Bridge at Haderslev's inner lake
