= Knud V. Engelhardt =

Danish industrial designer

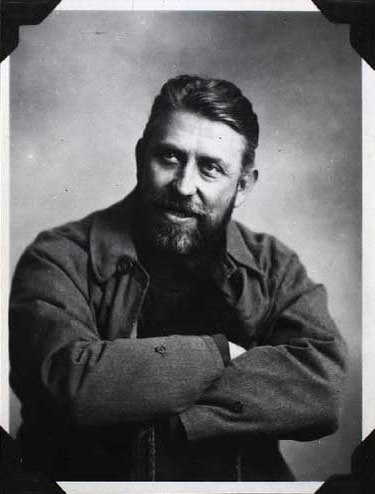
Knud V. Engelhardt

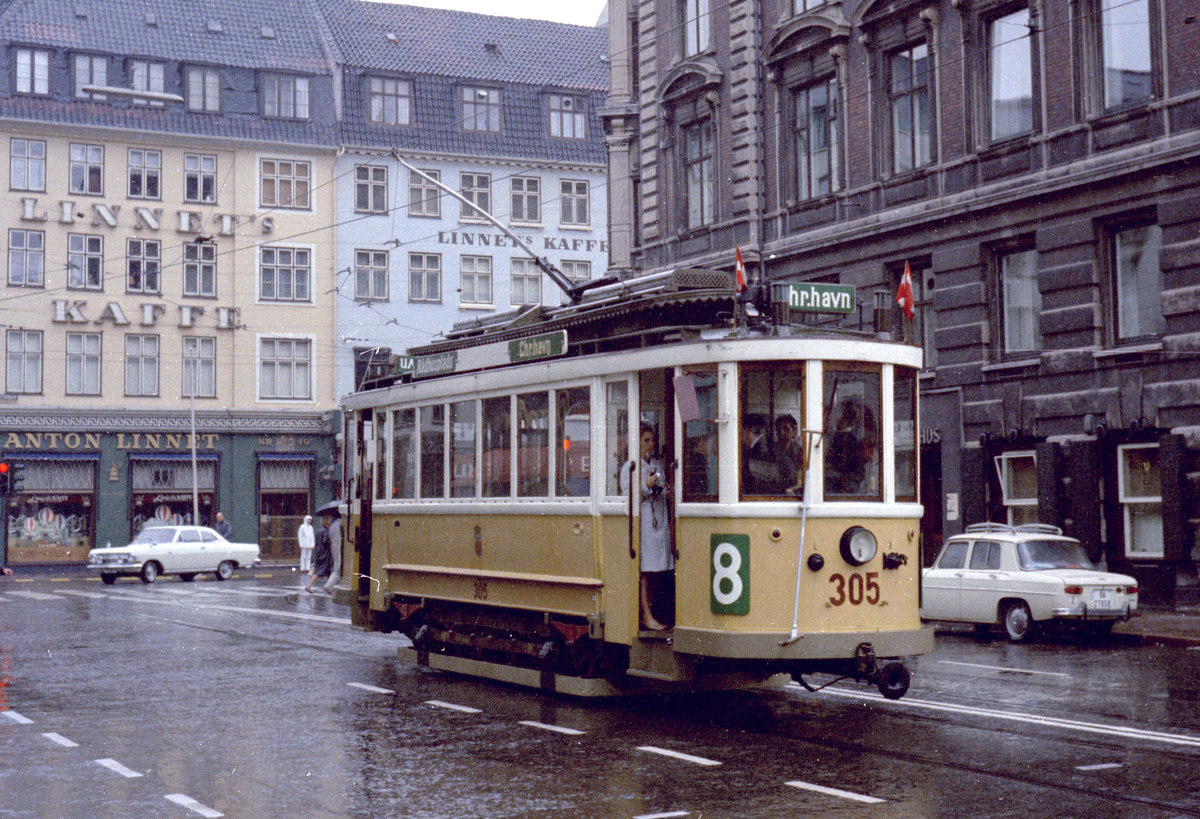
Engelhardt's curved tram designs were widely adopted

Knud Valdemar Engelhardt (11 February 1882 – 15 April 1931) was Denmark's first industrial designer. Influenced by the architect Thorvald Bindesbøll, Engelhardt understood that successful production depended on both an industrial and a graphical approach. The font he developed for Gentofte's road signs is sensitive and personal but also eminently readable. From 1908 to 1910, he designed electric trams for Copenhagen with intricate detail. The vehicles were functional and cleanable in all weathers, and were well manufactured.

Although Engelhardt was an architect, he also exerted a considerable influence on the development of Danish billboards. His printed posters always conveyed clear messages, enhanced by the accompanying text.

== Early life ==
After matriculating from the Technical School, Engelhardt spent three semesters at the Royal Danish Academy of Fine Arts until 1911 when he decided to transfer to the Decorating School where he was instructed by Joakim Skovgaard, graduating in 1915. He had already opened his own studio in 1909.

== Career ==
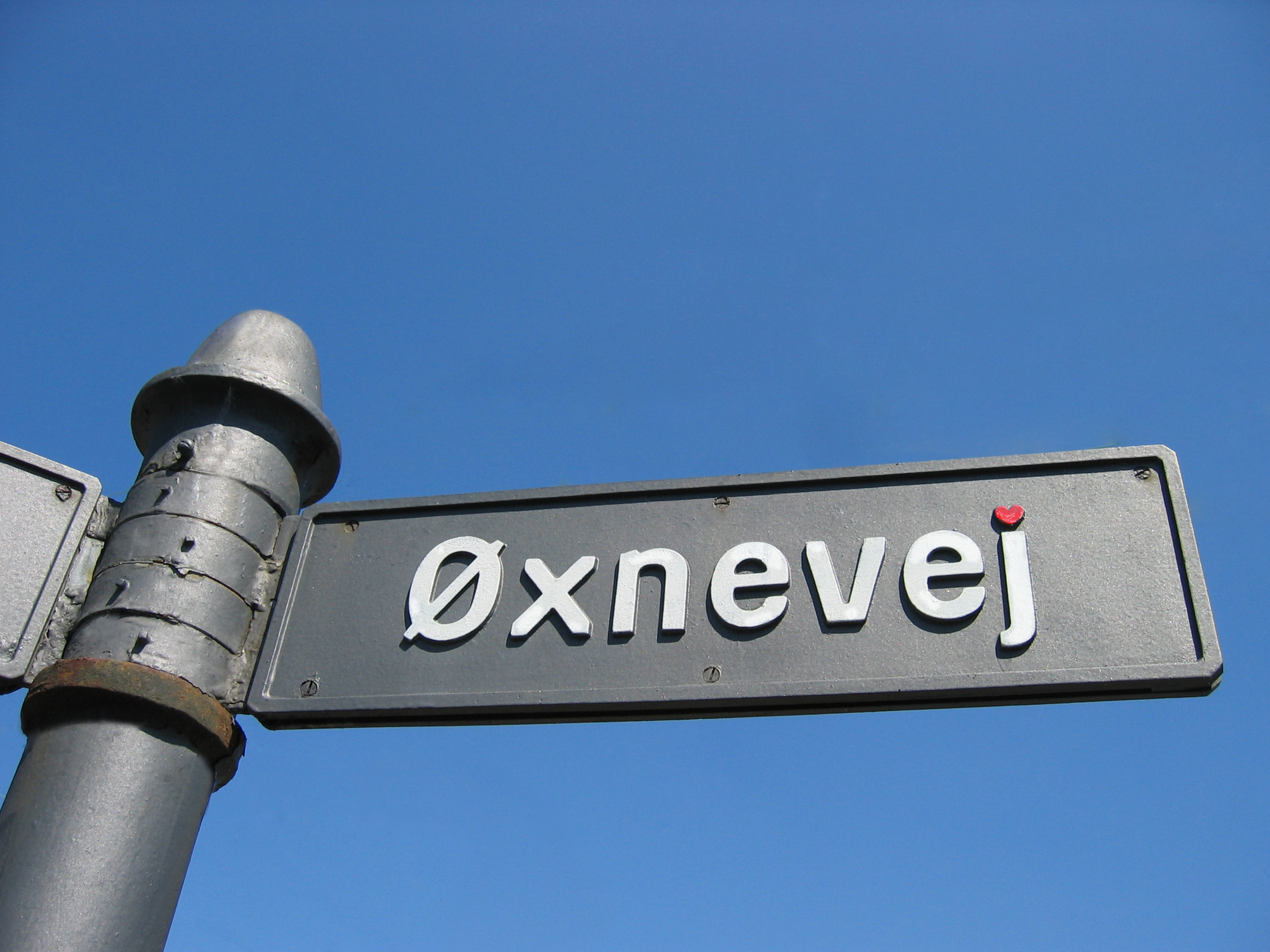
One of Engelhardt's street signs with a heart on the J

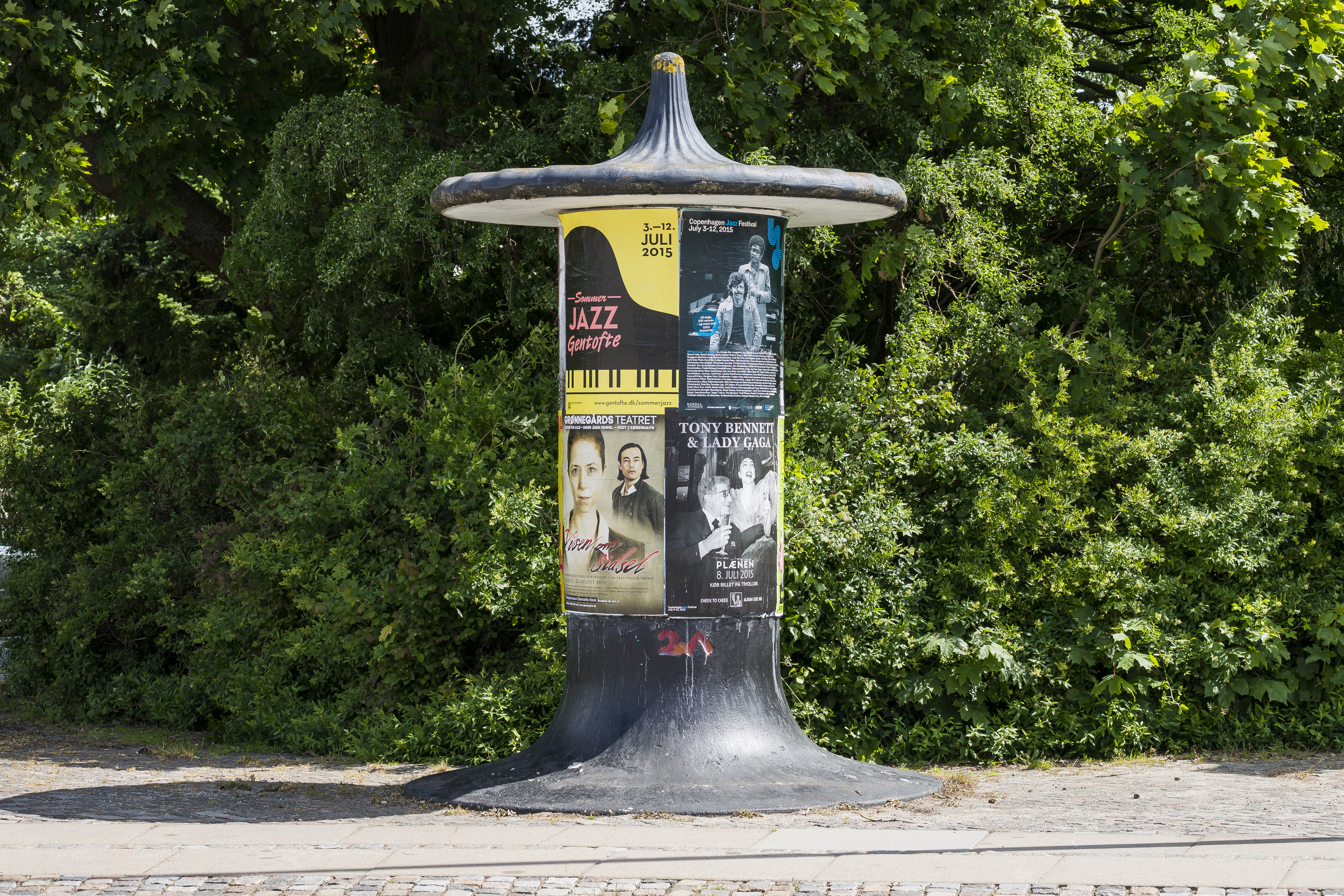
One of Engelhardt's advertising columns

As early as 1907, Engelhardt published his contribution on the kilometer stone which was to replace the milestone, suggesting the use of curbstones which were being replaced by paving flags. The smooth side could be engraved with red-painted Roman figures, marking each kilometer. While still at the Academy, he designed new tramcars for Copenhagen Tramways (Københavns Sporvogne), replacing the usual rectangular profiles with rounded contours both inside and out so as to provide a more human look for passengers.

Recognized for his typographical talents, in 1923, Engelhardt was invited to design street signs for the Copenhagen suburb of Gentofte. Inspired to some extent by the lettering designed by Thorvald Bindesbøll and Anton Rosen, he proposed a more simplified style with increased spacing between the letters. The breadth of the letters varied considerably, M and W being much wider than O, for example. His work was so successful that his lettering can still be seen on Gentofte's signs today. They can be clearly identified as Engelhardt's as, in lieu of a signature, he replaced the dot on the J (present on most signs as vej means road) with a little heart.

Also in 1923, he designed billboards for Gentofte. He soon became recognized for his fine lettering in a wide variety of forms and applications, including printing and logos. He practiced in many other fields including architecture (with a house innovatively designed at Højen near Skagen), oven manufacture (for H. Rasmussen, Odense), and the development of functional lines for Bindesbøll.

== Assessment and awards ==
More than anyone else, Engelhardt paved the way for a Danish approach to design and industrial production. He was awarded the Eckersberg Medal in 1927.
