= Christian August Volquardsen =

German historian (1840–1917)

Christian August Volquardsen (6 October 1840 – 1 August 1917) was a German classical historian.

Volquardsen was born in Hadersleben, studied history at the University of Kiel, and from 1864 to 1868 taught classes at the gymnasium in his hometown of Hadersleben. Afterwards, he worked as a schoolteacher in Potsdam, then in 1873 was named a professor of ancient history at the University of Kiel. In 1879 he relocated to the University of Göttingen, and in 1897 returned as a professor to Kiel. In 1909 he received the title of Geheimer Regierungsrat (privy government councilor). He died in Kiel.

== Principal works ==
- Untersuchungen über die Quellen der griechischen und sicilischen Geschichten bei Diodor, Buch XI bis XVI, 1868 – Studies involving the sources of Greek and Sicilian histories of Diodorus Siculus, Book XI to XVI.
- Rom im Übergange von der Republik zu Monarchie und Cicero als politischer Charakter, 1907 – Rome in passing from the Republic to Empire and Cicero as a political character.
- Aus schleswig-holsteinischer Geschichte, 1907 – On Schleswig-Holstein history.
