= Friedrich Volbehr =

German historian and journalist

Friedrich Ludwig Christian Volbehr (3 July 1819 – 6 August 1888) was a German historian and contributing editor.

== Life ==
Born in Kiel, from 1832 to 1839 Volbehr attended the Gelehrtenschule. Afterwards he studied theology at the University in Kiel. However, he did not take a theological Staatsexamen. From 1845 to 1853 he worked as a tutor on a noble estate in Holstein. During this time he was awarded a Dr. phil. degree in 1846 in Jena. From 1853 he directed a private institute in Elmshorn, but returned to Kiel as a private tutor. Besides, he was editor of the Kieler Correspondenzblatt and the Kieler Wochenblatt between 1859 and 1878. He rendered outstanding services to the local and regional history of Kiel and the surrounding area with a wide range of literature. On 6 August 1888 he died suddenly in Kiel at the age of 69 of a heart attack during a meeting of the Kunstverein as secretary.

== Foundations / Memberships ==
- Co-founder of the Kiel Institute for the Blind and member of the board until 1876
- Co-founder of the association for the care of those released from the institution for the blind
- Member and temporarily managing director of the Kieler Kunstverein
- From 1862 to 1876 member of the land committee for the construction of a new university building in Kiel
- Founder of the Society for Kiel City History and the associated Kiel City Library.

== Awards ==
- Holder of the Knight's Cross of the Order of the Crown (Prussia).

== Work ==
- Professoren und Dozenten der Christian-Albrechts-Universität zu Kiel 1665 bis 1933. Mühlau, 1934, 3rd revised edition by Richard Weyl
- Verzeichnis der gegenwärtig in Schleswig-Holstein angestellten und zur Anstellung berechtigten Geistlichen, welche nicht das Schleswig-Holsteinische Amtsexamen bestanden haben. Homann, 1869
- Die Schiller-Tage in Kiel. Kiel 1859
- Die Einweihungsfeier des neuen Universitäts-Gebäudes zu Kiel, 24. bis 26. Oktober 1876. Kiel 1876
- Beiträge zur Geschichte der Christian-Albrecht-Universität zu Kiel: Die drei Universitätsgebäude von 1665, 1768 und 1876. Die Frequenz der Universität von 1665 bis 1876. Kiel 1876
- Beiträge zur Topographie der Stadt Kiel in den letzten drei Jahrhunderten. 1st half (no more published): Schloß und Altstadt. Kiel 1881
- Kieler Predigergeschichte seit der Reformation. Kiel 1884
- Professoren und Docenten der Christian-Albrechts-Universität zu Kiel 1665 bis 1887. Kiel 1887

== Literature ==
- Carsten Erich Carstens (1896). "Volbehr, Friedrich Ludwig Christian" . Allgemeine Deutsche Biographie (in German). Vol. 40. Leipzig: Duncker & Humblot. pp. 223–224.
