= Haderslev Cathedral =

- The Cathedral of Our Lady; Vor Frue Kirke
- Haderslev Domkirke
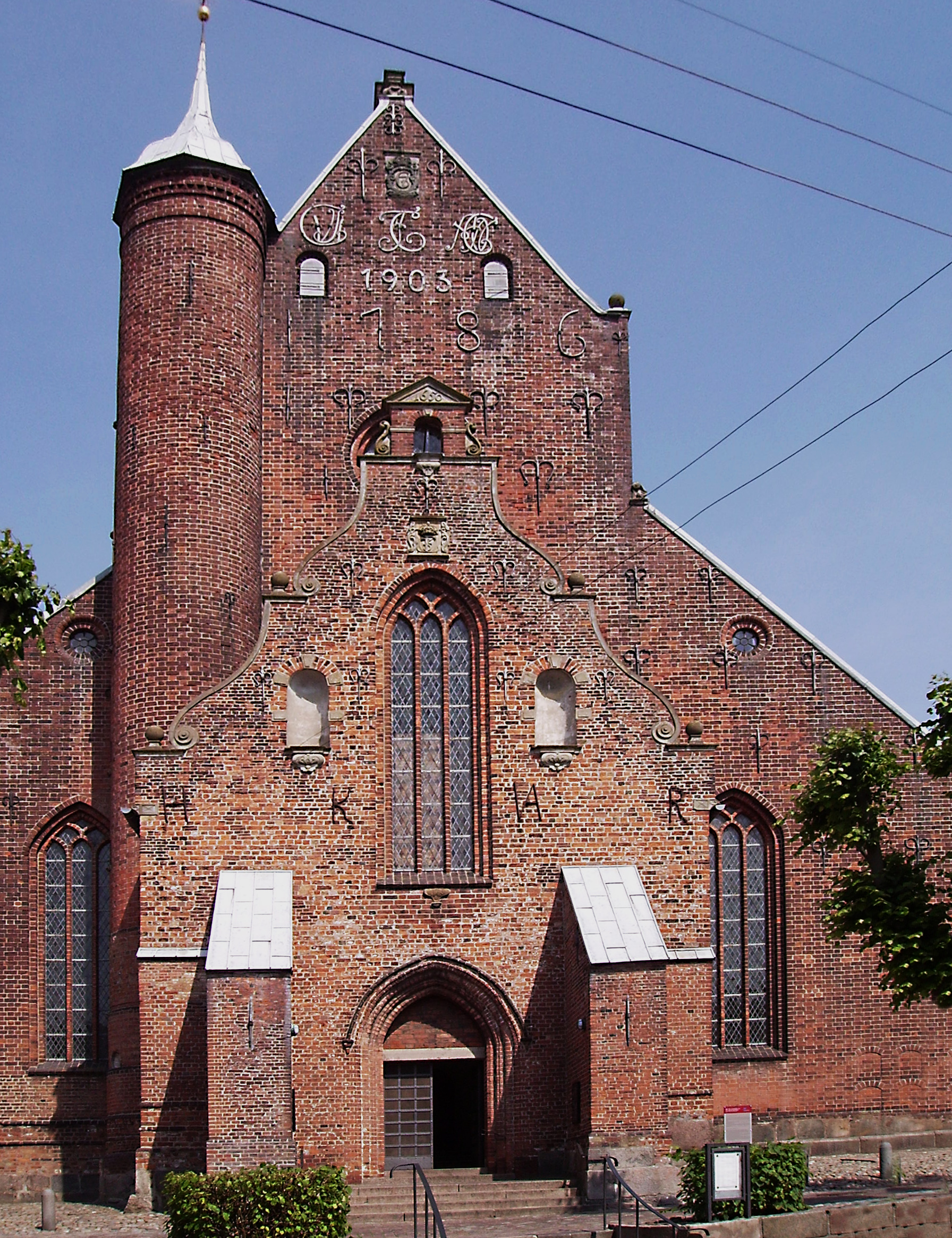
- Haderslev Cathedral
- 55°14′59.1″N 9°29′13.6″E
- Location: Haderslev
- Country: Denmark
- Denomination: Church of Denmark
- Previous denomination: Roman Catholic
- Website: www.haderslevdomsogn.dk

History
- Former name: The Collegiate Church of Our Lady
- Status: Active
- Founded: 12th century
- Dedication: Our Lady

Architecture
- Functional status: Cathedral
- Architectural type: Church
- Style: Gothic; Baroque; Romanesque
- Years built: 1420-1440

Administration
- Diocese: Haderslev

Clergy
- Bishop: Marianne Christiansen
- Vicar: Kirsten Münster
- Priest: Margaret Hammer

Haderslev Cathedral (Danish: Haderslev Domkirke) also known as Our Lady's Church is the cathedral church of the Diocese of Haderslev located in Haderslev, Denmark.

== History ==
=== The wooden church ===
It is assumed that the oldest church building in Haderslev was probably made of wood, and it probably was located in the place where the present church building is found, but no traces of it have been found. Nonetheless, this is not recorded anywhere and is highly unlikely that there has been a wooden church before the quarantine church, believed to be built in the second half of the 1100s. The oldest traces of the city of Haderslev originates from the 1100s.

=== 1100s ===
The first church building we know was a Romanesque quarantine church. It was undoubtedly built around the middle of the 1100s, and after its destruction a hundred years later its granite blocks were used in the foundation of the new church building and recycled by subsequent rebuilding. It is still seen in the choir and west wall of the present church, as well as at the entrance to the northern door of the church, and provides certain information about the shape and decoration of this church. It thus appears that it must have had a half-round crossing. A pebbly stone in the southwest corner of the present church deserves special attention, because as it is very likely the cornerstone.

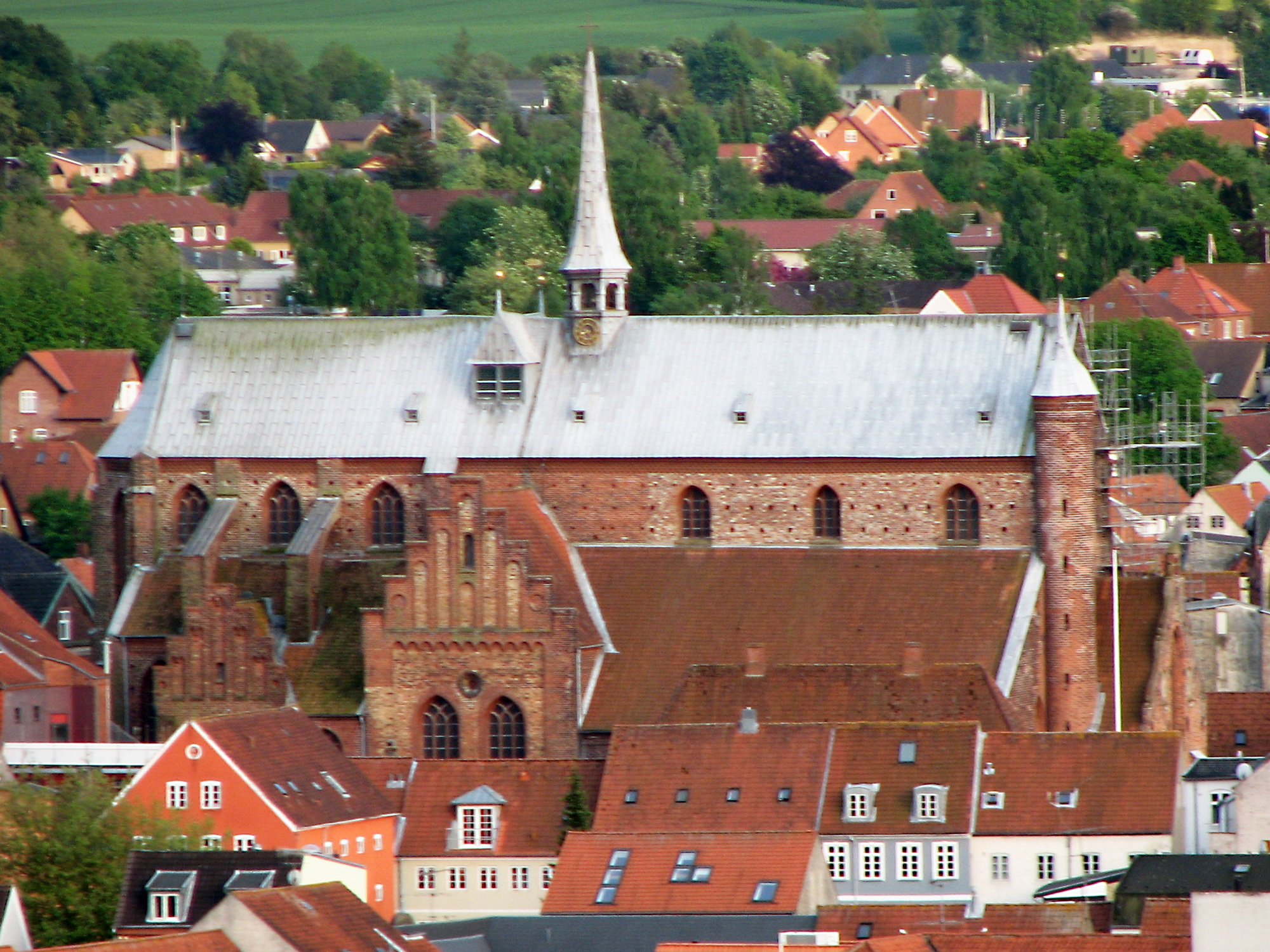
The cathedral from the north

=== 1200s ===
It has previously been assumed that the quarantine church was destroyed in connection with the wars between King Eric IV of Denmark and King Abel in 1247, but there is no evidence that these wars affected the church. The destruction was probably more about tearing down the too modest old church to construct a larger church with an appearance that suited an expanding city. The quarantine church was replaced with a large brick church in mixed Romanesque-Gothic style. Remains of this church were later used in the construction of the Church of St Nicholas (Sct. Nicolai Kirke) in Aabenraa and Løgum Abbey the Cistercian abbey in Løgumkloster.

One can still imagine its exterior by considering the transept of the present church, built by large yellow and pink stones, which can easily be distinguished from subsequent changes and extensions whose stone is dark red. The southern gable is the best preserved part of the building from this period.

In 1270 a significant rebuilding took place. The church was constructed in a Hall church model after the North German model, with two side aisles, whose width corresponded to half of the main aisle. The church was larger than the previous one, reflecting the church's new title of a collegiate church. As such, it was mentioned for the first time in 1273, when it was given to the Bishop of Schleswig to be part of Aller parish. It was then necessary to include a number of altars for the Collegiate Chapter.

=== 1400s ===
The history of Our Lady's Church was closely linked to the common political and cultural development of Southern Jutland. In particular, the conflict associated with King Eric of Pomerania and the Counts of Schauenburg and Holstein between 1413 and 1423.

In those years, the former Schleswig Diocese was divided between the two parties, and the struggles waved especially back and forth in the area around Flensburg. This meant that the connection between the collegiate chapter of Haderslev to the Diocese of Schleswig was discontinued and soon a plan was made to separate Haderslev from Schleswig and create a separate Diocese of Haderslev. In 1415 King Erik secured the Our Lady Church in Haderslev and the whole chapter with offices and cannons, against any kind of taxation and other inconveniences. At the same time, the revenues of a number of churches were given to Our Lady's Church in Haderslev, which riches left it with significant large estates. This financial stability granted the chapter the necessarily means to rebuild the church. The new larger church was built between 1420-1440 reflecting the new plans which wanted to create a new diocese with Our Lady's church as its cathedral. The men behind the construction project wanted to create a Gothic cathedral, fully worthy of being the main church of an independent Haderslev Diocese. In fact, a document from that time already referred to the new church as Haderslev Cathedral.

Flensburg fell in 1431 to Schleswig-Holstein forces which prevailed in the long-standing war with King Erik, and the dream of a separate Haderslev Diocese had to be abandoned. The bishop of Schleswig demanded that the construction of the new Haderslev church should be stopped, however the church was still completed in a high Gothic style with tall apses and transept. A tower was later built with a saddle roof. A number of chapels were added to the church building during the late Middle Ages.

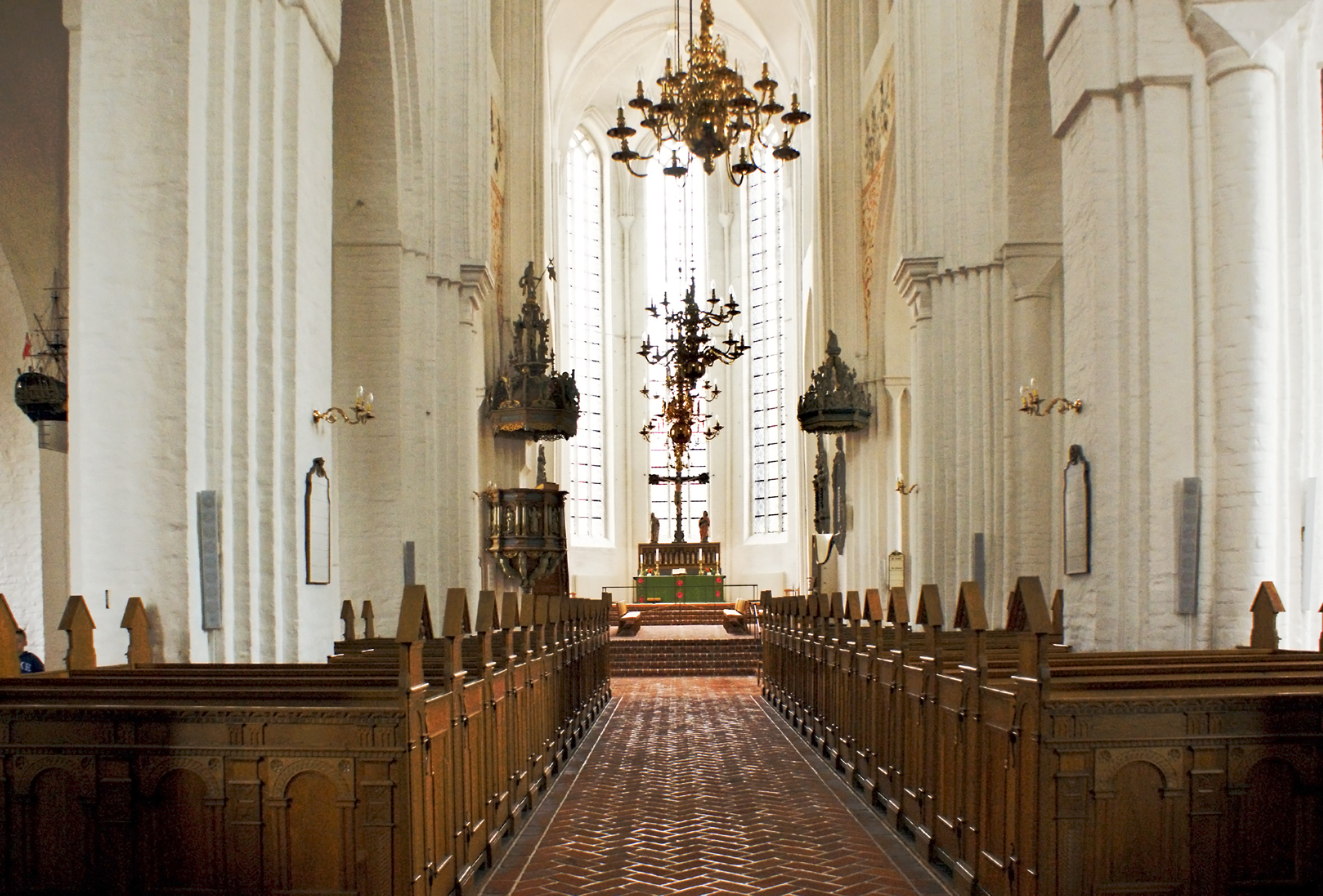
Interior of the Cathedral

=== Reformation ===
In 1525 the Collegiate church in Haderslev became the country's first evangelical Lutheran church after the change in the Church of Denmark from Roman Catholic to evangelical Lutheran under the initiatives of King Christian III of Denmark. In fact Haderslev can therefore be rightly called the "Nordic Wittenberg".

=== Fire ===
In 1627, troops of the Thirty Years' War caused a terrible fire that hit the church and a large part of the city. The great tower of the church and its western part, as well as the entire northwestern part of the present church building, became a victim of the flames. Restoration and reconstruction progressed slowly and was only completed in 1650. There was no way to restore the church in its original form. The great west side of the church was rebuilt. The main entrance was built using both Renaissance and Baroque architecture. All recent restorations have preserved the church in the shape it had in 1650.

=== Cathedral Church ===
The Diocese of Haderslev was created in 1922 and Haderslev church was chosen as the cathedral of the diocese. Thus, after nearly 500 years since rebuilding the church with the intention of becoming a cathedral, Haderslev church became an official cathedral in its own right.

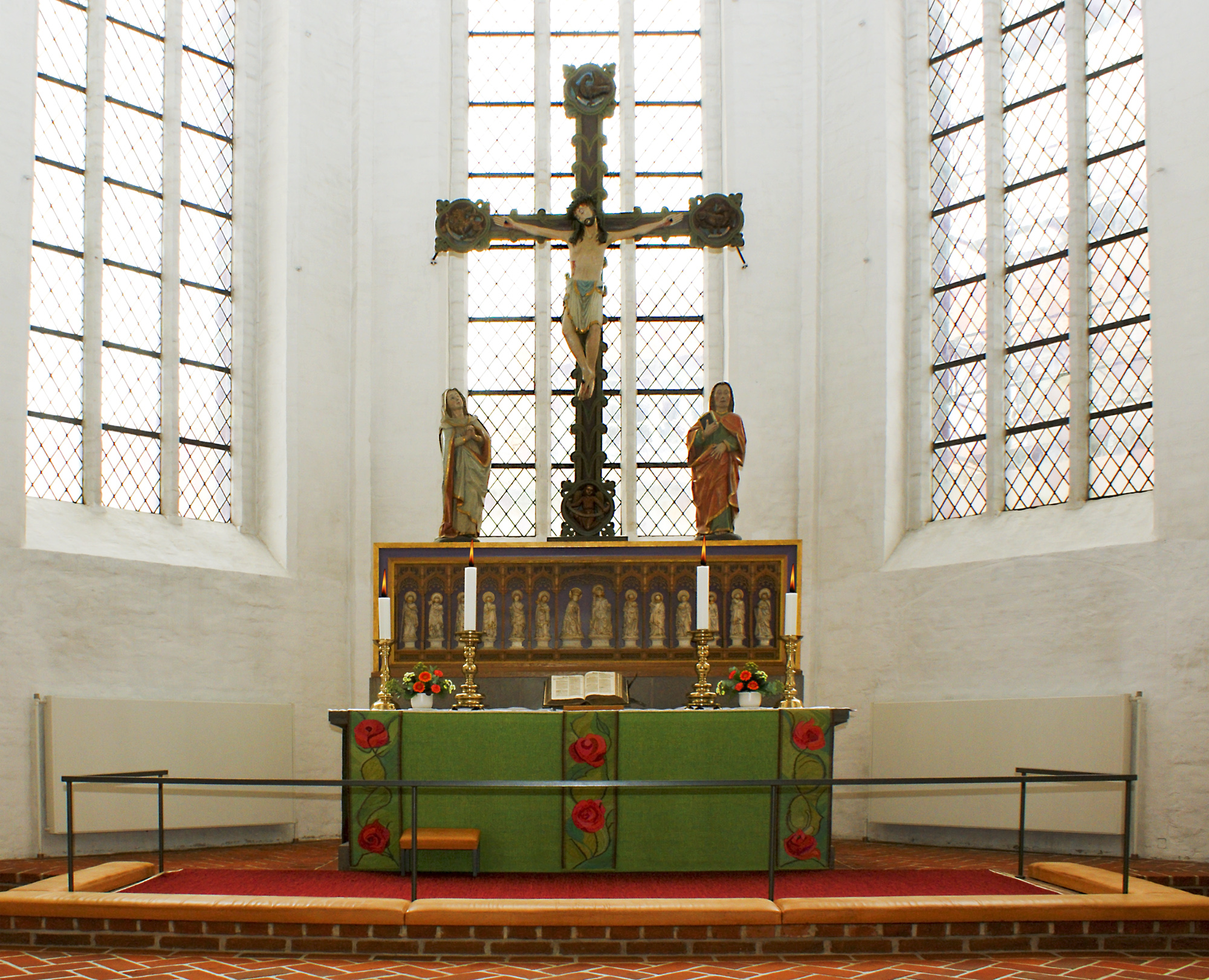
High altar

=== Later Renovations ===
The church was last restored between 1941-51 where the whole of the church was whitewashed. A few paintings were uncovered, amongst them 12 seals of different families from southern Jutland and Holstein Families, another of Saint Peter, and in the north crossing one depicting Saint Barbara. The restoration was done by architects Harald Lønborg-Jensen and Helge Holm, thereby giving the church its current appearance. In the summer of 2009, a major repair was done on the south side of the roof, which was damaged because of the rain and other elements.

== Interior ==
=== Altar ===
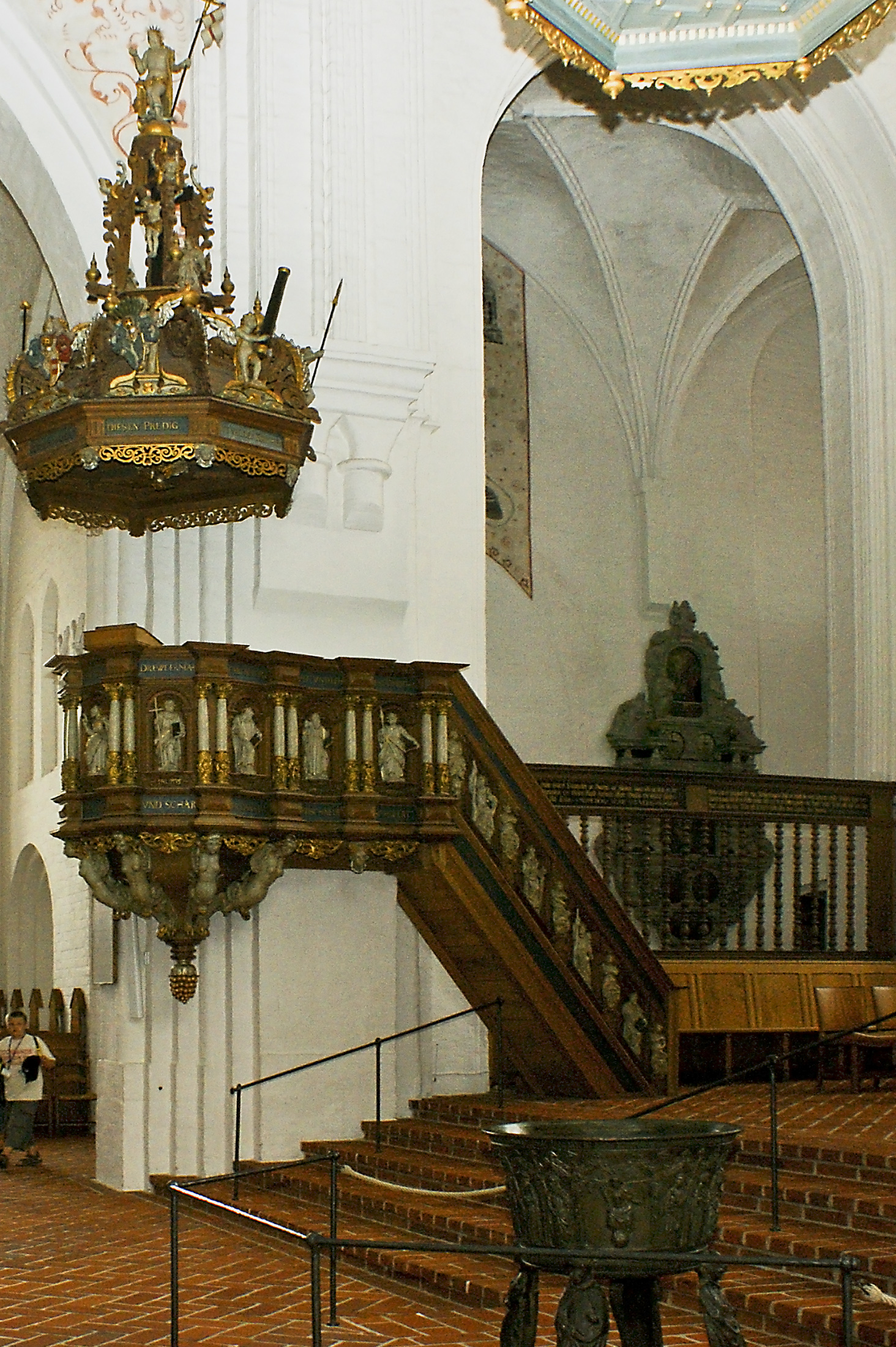
Pulpit and Baptismal font

The present high altar was added to the church during the renovations of 1941-51. The altar table was designed by Lønborg Jensen. A medieval top with incisions was also added. The crucifix above the altar dates from the 1300s brought over from Egebjerg in Odsherred. The cross includes the four symbols of the evangelists. The cross also features the figures Mary and John dating from the 1400s and originated from Seem Church near Ribe. The figures of the twelve apostles date from the 1400s and were previously located in Hertug Hans Hospitalskirke in Haderslev.

=== Pulpit and Baptismal font ===
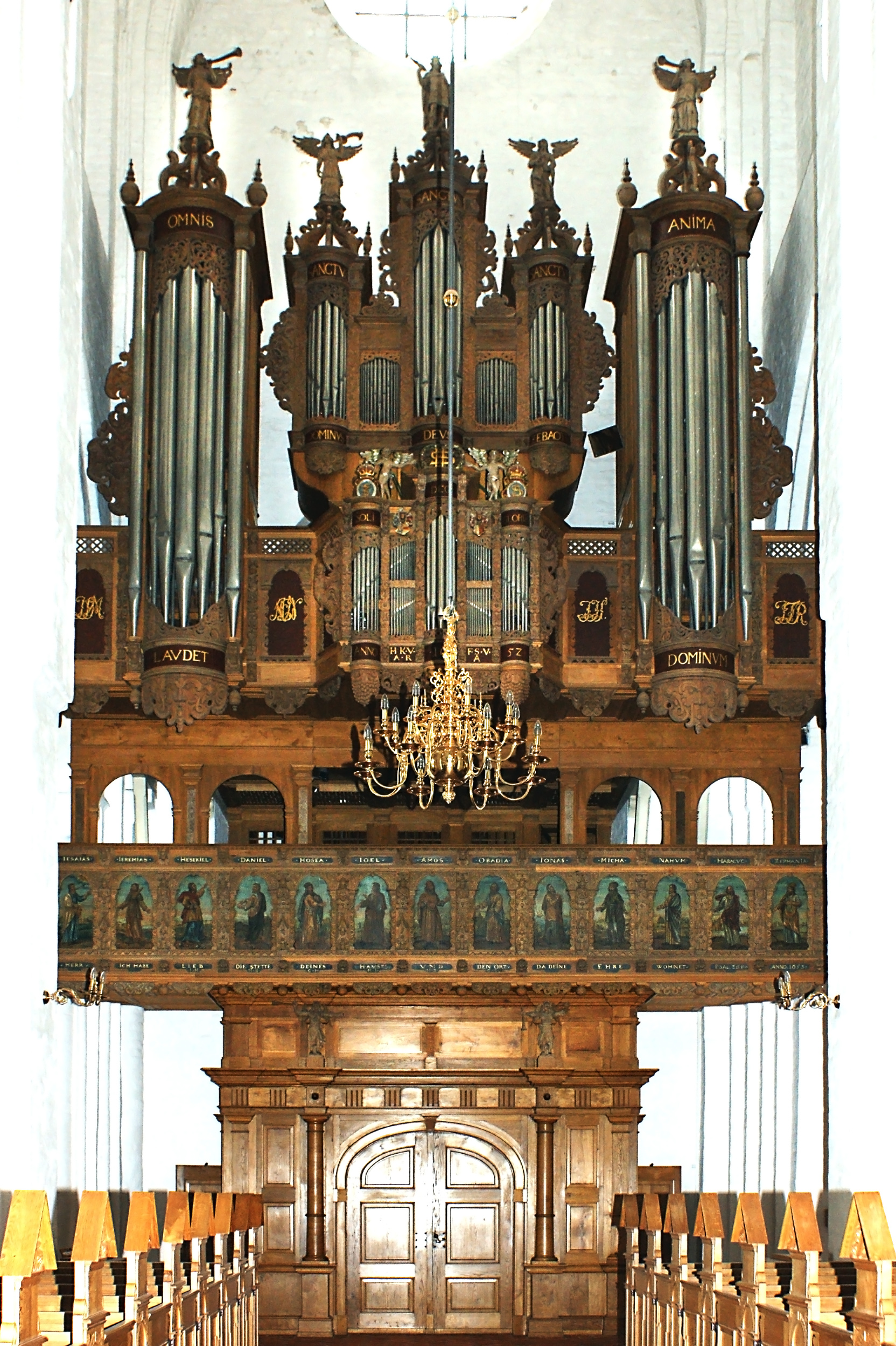
Organ

The pulpit and its top were donated by Georg von Ahlefeldt and Margrete Blumen in 1636. The stairs leading to the pulpit and the pulpit is decorated with figures of the apostles. The Baptismal fount is made of bronze, was made in 1485 in Flensburg. The font is lifted by 4 figures of the 4 evangelists.

=== Organ ===
The organ originates from 1652 and was made by Peter Carstensen. The organ was restored in 1948 by Marcussen & Søn. The organ currently has 73 ranks divided into four manuals and pedals, making it one of the largest in Denmark.

=== Epitaphs in the cathedral ===
Similar to most city churches, Haderslev Cathedral also houses a number of historically and artistically valuable epitaphs, reminiscent of the famous people of the city and the church in the 1600s and 1700s. These memorial, along with some paintings with biblical motifs, are hung on the church's walls. The epitaphs of the priests of the church were written in Latin, while the memorials of notable citizens were written in German, which was the official language of the town, although most citizens spoke their Danish dialect in their daily lives.

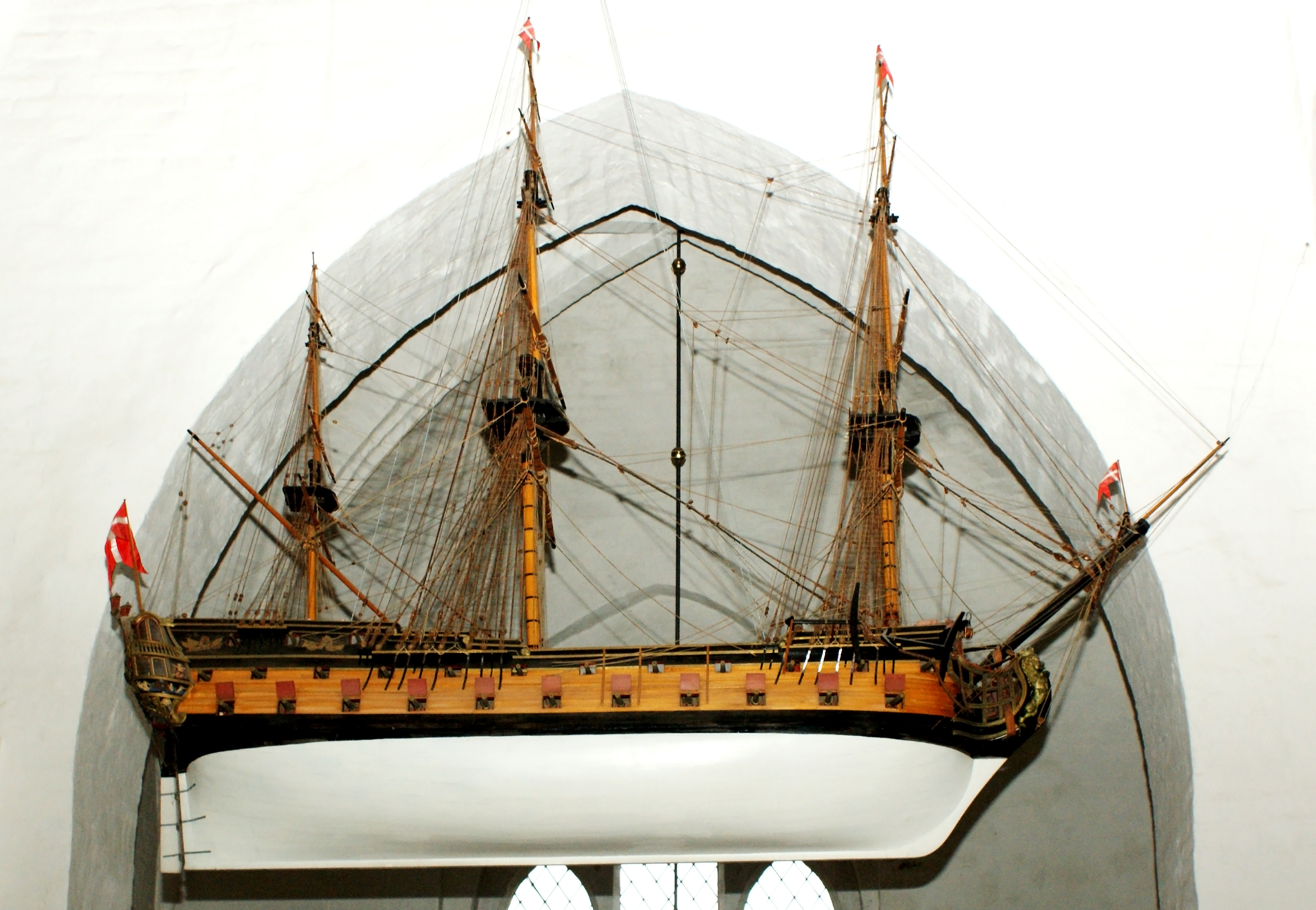
The votive ship (1950)

=== Other works of art ===
In the southern side of the cathedral there several paintings, including an aftermath of unknown artists high up on the east wall. The painting has been part of the church's former altarpiece. The motif is derived from the renowned renaissance painter Peter Candid's Last supper. The cathedral has 18 chandeliers, the two oldest are from 1605 and 1655 respectively. The Votive ship represents the Fyn from 1950.

== Related reading ==
- Niels Peter Stilling (2000) Politikens bog om Danmarks kirker (København: Politikens Forlag) ISBN 9788756760591
