= Sønderborg Castle =

Castle in Sønderborg, Denmark

Coordinates: 54°54′25″N 9°47′01″E

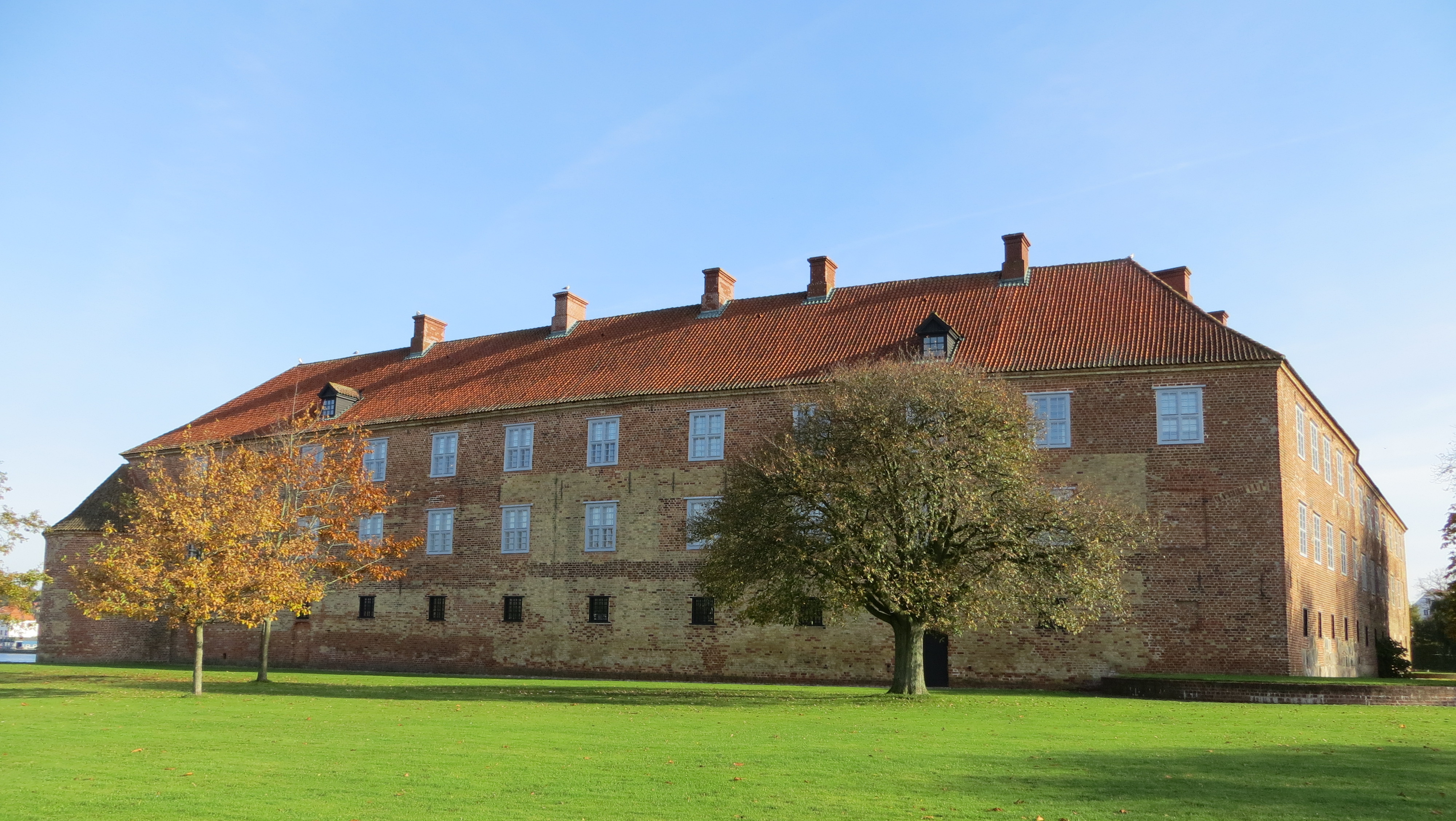
Sønderborg Castle

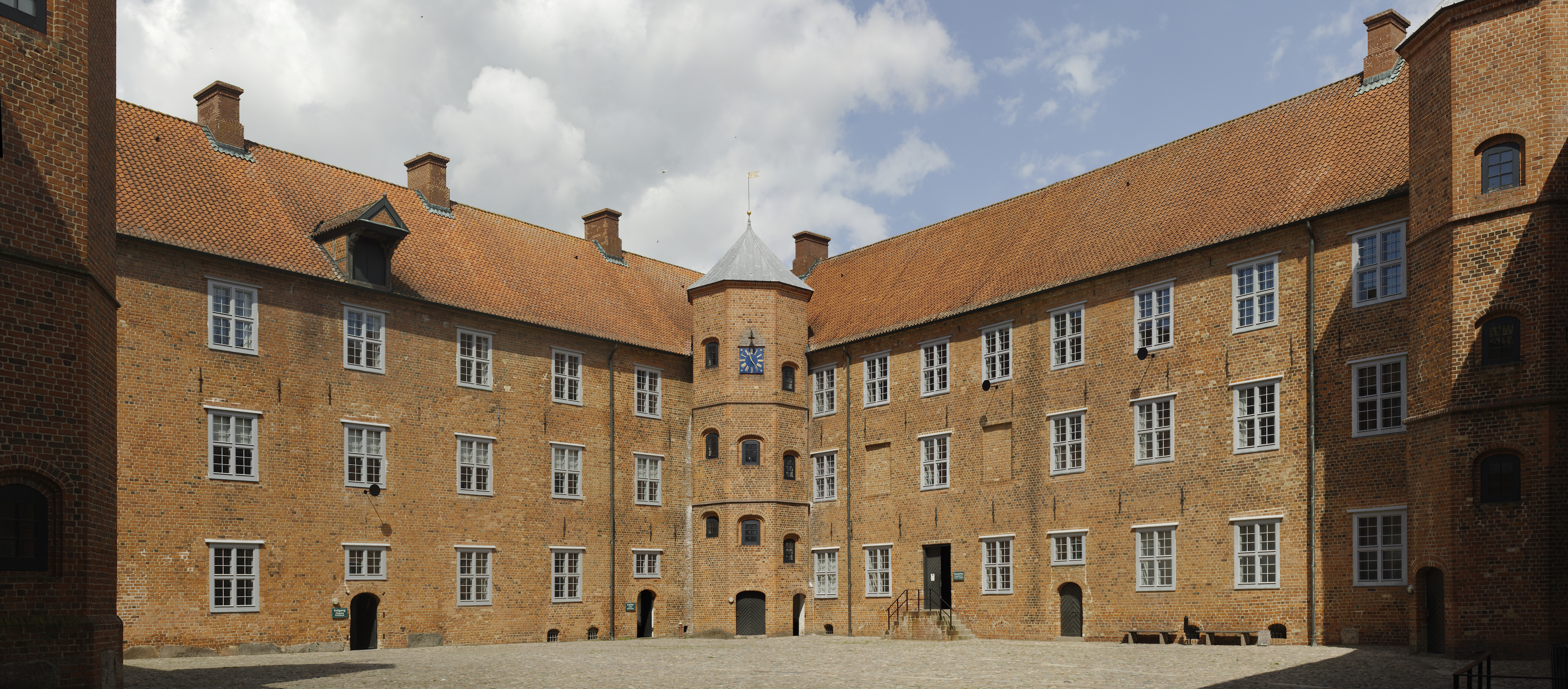
Sønderborg Castle courtyard

Sønderborg Castle (German: Schloss Sonderburg; Danish: Sønderborg Slot) is located in the town of Sønderborg, Denmark on the island of Als in South Jutland. It houses a museum focusing on the history and culture of the area. The castle is located in the middle of the town, in a park setting overlooking Als Fjord. The museum is open year-round.

== History ==
Sønderborg Castle began probably as a fortified tower constructed by Valdemar the Great in 1158, built on an islet in Als Strait (Als Sund) that later was connected to the island of Als. As it lies to the south of the isle of Als, it was named Sønderborg, literally "southern fortress" (compare English "Sudbury"). The castle was built to provide protection against attacks by the Wends and was part of a larger system of fortifications. Over the centuries, the castle has gradually been enlarged and rebuilt.

In the years following construction of Valdemar's fortified tower, an important struggle developed between the Danish king and the duke of Schleswig over ownership of the island of Als and the town of Sønderborg. Ownership of the castle changed hands many times. A peak in the history of the castle was the wedding of Valdemar IV of Denmark (Valdemar Atterdag) (ca. 1320-1375) to Helvig of Schleswig, the sister of Valdemar V, Duke of Schleswig.

Around 1350, the castle was expanded significantly by the addition of both the Blue Tower (Blåtårn) and huge outer walls. In 1490, the fortress became the property of the Danish crown. Both King Hans and his son Christian II extended Sønderborg Castle and made it into one of the country's strongest fortresses.

In 1532, Christian II was lured into an ambush and taken to Sønderborg Castle, where he was held as a prisoner of state for seventeen years (1532-1549). Legend tells that the dethroned king was confined to the Blue Tower, but in reality he lived in comparatively lavish circumstances and probably was allowed freedom of movement within the outer walls, if sometimes under closely guarded conditions. The former king sometimes even joined the noble hunts at Als.

Christian III in the mid-sixteenth century had the fortress modified and converted into a four-wing castle by architect Hercules von Oberberg (1517–1602) between 1549-57. King Hans'west wing was preserved and a further three wings were added in the new Renaissance style. After Christian III's death in 1559, Hercules von Oberberg built the unique castle chapel in 1568-1570 for Queen Mother Dorothea.

After Dorothea's death in 1571, the castle passed into the ownership of Hans II, Duke of Schleswig-Holstein-Sonderburg (also known as Hans the Younger). Under his rule, the castle became the center of a tiny duchy, Schleswig-Holstein-Sonderburg. This, however, was divided after his death in 1622.

The castle remained in the hands of the dukes of Southern Jutland until 1667, when the ruined duchy of Sønderborg was attached to the Danish throne and the castle became a Danish estate. The duchy’s representative, the Prefect (Amtmanden), took up residence at the castle. It was otherwise more or less unused in the years 1667-1718.

In 1718-1726, Frederik IV had the castle rebuilt in Baroque style by contractor general Wilhelm von Platen. The Blue Tower was demolished in 1755, and in 1764 the castle passed into the hands of the Duke of Augustenborg; but, contrary to expectations, the castle did not become the duke's residence. Instead, it was rented out as a warehouse.

During both the first and the second Slesvig wars (1848-1850, 1864), Sønderborg Castle was used as a camp hospital and for quartering Danish troops. After the war of 1864, the province and the castle became Prussian property and served as barracks from 1867 until the area was reunified with Denmark in 1920. The last duke of Augustenborg, Ernst Günther, allowed Sønderborg County Museum to move into a part of the castle in 1920. The next year, the Danish state bought the castle from the Duke, taking over the castle in 1921 and allowing several institutions to use it as long as they paid heed to the expanding museum.

In 1945 and 1946, the castle was used as an internment camp for persons charged with offenses to the state.

The Royal Inspectors of Listed State Buildings, Peter Koch and Jørgen Stærmose, conducted a thorough restoration of the castle from 1964 to 1973, returning it to the Baroque form it had been given by Frederik IV in the 1720s. The windows from the barracks era were even replaced with "masks", windows with broad wooden frames made of planks like the ones in Platen's castle.

== The museum and grounds ==
Since 1921 Sønderborg Castle has been the home for The Sønderborg Castle Museum (Museet på Sønderborg Slot), which is the main museum for the former Duchy of Slesvig. The museum houses local and regional history collections from the Middle Ages to the present day, but with especial focus on the Schleswig wars of 1848-50 and 1864, World War II, and the Reunification of 1920. The museum also hosts exhibitions on navigation, textiles and handicrafts, and has a small art collection with works by prominent Southern Jutland painters over the years. The museum is a part of Museum Sønderjylland, a constellation of museums in Southern Jutland.

The original ramparts around the castle became a visible part of the gardens in the 1970s.

== The Chapel of Sønderborg Castle ==
The unique chapel of Sønderborg Castle, also known as Queen Dorothea's Chapel (Dronning Dorotheas Kapel) was built 1568-70 by Hercules von Oberberg for Queen Mother Dorothea reflects the changing times in Denmark after the Reformation. It is almost untouched, and is considered to be one of Europe's oldest and best-preserved Lutheran royal chapels.

Many of the items in the chapel were created in Antwerp workshop of painter Frans Floris (1517–1570).

One of the royal couple’s sons, John II, Duke of Schleswig-Holstein-Sonderburg (1545–1622) had a burial room built in the chapel with an imposing portal of marble and alabaster.

The chapel’s organ is attributed to organ builder Hermann Raphaëlist (ca. 1515-1583) and it is estimated to have been built ca. 1570. The paintwork on the organ case dates mainly from 1626. Hermann Raphaëlis was of Dutch descent and was the son of organ builder Gabriel Raphael Rottensteen. Raphaëlis was summoned to Denmark ca. 1550, supposedly to build an organ for Roskilde Cathedral. Apart from the instrument at Roskilde Cathedral, built in 1555, he also built an organ for the Chapel of Copenhagen Castle in 1557. Raphaëlis later settled in Saxony, where he among other things built organs in the chapels of castles belonging to Elector August of Saxony, the Queen Dorothea’s son-in-law.

Under the west gallery of the chapel there is a choir loft over which there was originally a royal chair; this disappeared when the organ was built in its present position in 1626. The chairs were made by local wood carver, Niels Tagsen, who also fashioned the pulpit and the 3 figures which were placed on the organ in 1626. The organ case and doors were partly repainted by Wulf Petersen of Sønderborg on the same occasion.

The organ was reconstructed in 1996 by Danish organ builder and historian, Mads Kim Kjersgaard, in accordance with 16th century traditions with regard to tone and craftsmanship. The museum has a permanent exhibition of preserved parts from the Renaissance organ, including a rat's nest taken from one of the organ’s bellows.

== The Great Hall ==
The Great Hall (Riddersal) is 34 meters long and was the reception room for ducal guests, and the scene of parties and dances. The room is still used for special events, such as in connection with the marriage of Queen Margrethe II's niece, Princess Alexandra of Sayn-Wittgenstein-Berleburg to Count Jefferson-Friedrich von Pfeil und Klein-Ellguth in 1998.

== Management ==
Sønderborg Castle is owned by the Danish state, run by the Palaces and Properties Agency (Slots- og Ejendomsstyrelsen) and used by Sønderborg Castle Museum, which is jointly owned by the municipality of Sønderborg and by South Jutland County.

== Other sources ==
- Otto Norn, Jørgen Paulsen and Jørgen Slettebo, Sønderborg Slot. Historie og bygning, G.E.C. Gad forlag, 1963.
