= Duke of Estonia =

Title given by the king of Denmark in 13th century

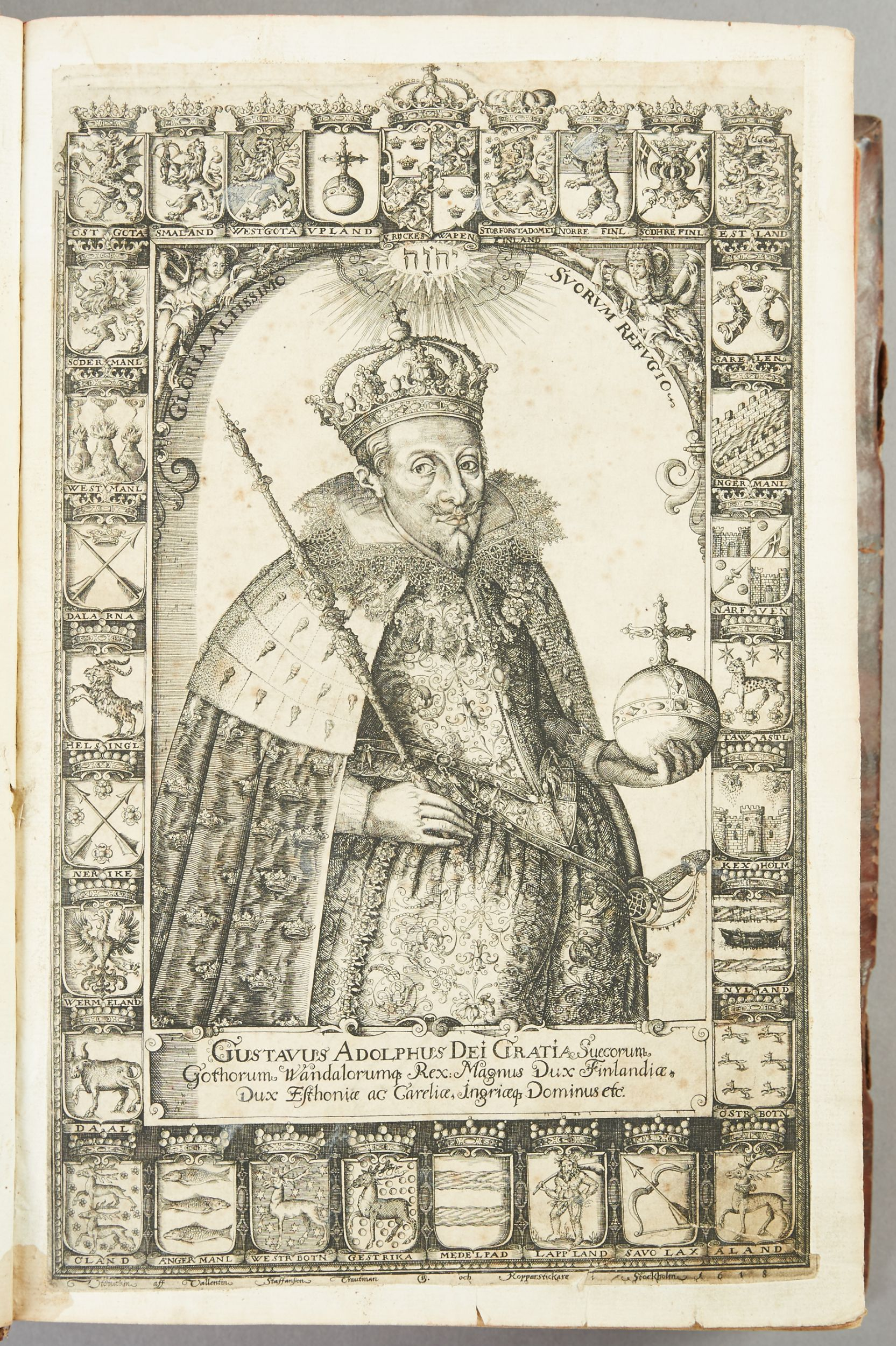
Portrait of King Gustav II Adolph of Sweden including Duke of Estonia in his stated titles

The first duke of Estonia (Danish: Hertug af Estland) was appointed in 1220 by King Valdemar II of Denmark after the Danish conquest of Estonia during the Livonian crusade. The title was resumed by the kings of Denmark since 1269. During the 1266–82 reign of the queen dowager Margaret Sambiria, the title lady of Estonia (Latin: Domina Estonie) was used.

In 1332, after Christopher II died, his second son Otto inherited the title of the duke of Estonia. Valdemar III assumed the title in 1338.

The dukes of Estonia rarely resided in Estonia. To govern the Duchy of Estonia, the king of Denmark and royal counsellors appointed the Lieutenant (Latin: Capitaneus), who resided in Reval.

The king of Denmark sold the duchy to the Teutonic Order in 1346, but Christian I reassumed the title of duke of Estonia in 1456.

After the Livonian War, Estonia became part of the Swedish Empire, and the title was gained by kings of Sweden. Crown Prince Gustav Adolph was already Duke of Estonia 1607–1611 before he became King, but then officially abolished all Swedish duchies in 1618.

The title was resumed by the Russian tsars after the Great Northern War and the Treaty of Nystad, when Estonia became part of the Russian Empire. The last duke of Estonia (Russian: Князь Эстляндский) was therefore tsar Nicholas II of Russia.

== Danish dukes of Estonia ==
The Duchy of Estonia (1219–1346) was part of the Kingdom of Denmark, where the House of Estridsen reigned.

Name	Portrait	Birth	Marriages	Death
Canute I (Knud Valdemarsen ) 1220–1227 (deposed)		1205 illegitimate son of Valdemar II of Denmark and Helena Guttormsdotter	Hedwig of Pomerelia before 1260 two children	1260 aged 55
Occupied by the Livonian Brothers of the Sword:1227-1237
Occupied by the Livonian Order of the Teutonic Order:1237-1238
Canute I (Knud Valdemarsen ) 1238–40 (restored)		1205 illegitimate son of Valdemar II of Denmark and Helena Guttormsdotter	Hedwig of Pomerelia before 1260 two children	1260 aged 55
Valdemar I the Victorious (Valdemar Sejr); 1240–41		9 May/28 June 1170 second son of Valdemar I and Sophia of Minsk	(1) Dagmar of Bohemia c. 1205; Lübeck one son (2) Berengaria of Portugal; 18/24 May 1214 four children	28 March 1241; Vordingborg Castle aged 70
Eric I Ploughpenny (Erik Plovpenning); 1241–50		c. 1216 eldest son of Valdemar I and Berengaria of Portugal	Jutta of Saxony; 17 November 1239 six children	9 August 1250 on the Schlei aged 33–34
Abel; 1 November 1250–1252		c. 1218 second son of Valdemar I and Berengaria of Portugal	Matilda of Holstein; 25 April 1237; Schleswig Cathedral four children	29 June 1252; Eiderstedt aged 33–34
Christopher I (Christoffer 1.); 25 December 1252–1259		c. 1219 third son of Valdemar I and Berengaria of Portugal	Margaret Sambiria c. 1248 five children	29 May 1259; Ribe aged 39–40
Eric II Klipping (Erik Klipping); 1259–66 (abdicated)		c. 1249 eldest son of Christopher I and Margaret Sambiria	Agnes of Brandenburg; 11 November 1273; Schleswig Cathedral seven children	22 November 1286; Finderup aged 36–37
Margaret Sambiria (Margrethe Sambiria); 1266-1282		c. 1230 daughter of Sambor II of Pomerelia and Matilda of Mecklenburg	Christopher I of Denmark c.1248 five children	December 1282; Finderup aged 51–52
Eric II Klipping (Erik Klipping); 1282–86 (restored)		c. 1249 eldest son of Christopher I and Margaret Sambiria	Agnes of Brandenburg; 11 November 1273; Schleswig Cathedral seven children	22 November 1286; Finderup aged 36–37
Eric III Menved (Erik Menved); 1286–1319		c. 1274 eldest son of Eric II and Agnes of Brandenburg	Ingeborg of Sweden; June 1296; Kärnan Castle fourteen children	13 November 1319; Roskilde aged 44–45
Christopher II (Christoffer 2.); 25 January 1320–26 (deposed)		29 September 1276 second son of Eric II and Agnes of Brandenburg	Euphemia of Pomerania c. 1300 six children	2 August 1332; Nykøbing Castle aged 55
Eric (IV) (Erik Christoffersen); 1321-26 (deposed)		c. 1307 eldest son of Christopher II and Euphemia of Pomerania	Elizabeth of Holstein-Rendsburg; 1330 no issue	early 1332 aged c. 25
Valdemar II (Valdemar 3.); 1326–1329 (deposed)		c. 1314 only son of Eric II, Duke of Schleswig and Adelaide of Holstein	Richardis of Schwerin two sons	c. 1364 aged 49–50
Canute II Porse (Knud Pedersen Porse) (House of Porse) 1329–30 (elected)		c.1282 Son of Peter Knudsen Porse	Ingeborg of Norway; 21 June 1327 three children	30 May 1330; Copenhagen aged 47–48
Ingeborg of Norway (Ingibjörg Hákonardóttir); 1329–32 (co-ruler)		1301 daughter of Haakon V of Norway and Euphemia of Rügen	Duke Eric Magnusson; 1312; Oslo two children Canute II Porse; 21 June 1327 three children	17 June 1361 aged 59–60
Otto (Otto Christoffersen); 1332-38		c. 1310 second son of Christopher II and Euphemia of Pomerania	unmarried	after 1341 aged c. 31/32
Valdemar II (Valdemar 3.); 1338-40 (restored)		c. 1314 only son of Eric II, Duke of Schleswig and Adelaide of Holstein	Richardis of Schwerin two sons	c. 1364 aged 49–50
Valdemar III Atterdag (Valdemar Atterdag); 21 June 1340–46		c. 1320 third son of Christopher II and Euphemia of Pomerania	Helvig of Schleswig c. 1340; Sønderborg Castle six children	24 October 1375; Gurre Castle aged 54–55

In 1346, Northern Estonia is sold to the Livonian Order. This Order was already ruling Southern Estonia since 1237.

== Swedish dukes of Estonia ==
The Duchy of Estonia (1561–1721) or Swedish Estonia was part of the Swedish Empire.

=== House of Vasa ===
Name	Portrait	Birth	Marriage(s)	Death
Eric XIV (Erik XIV); 1561– 29 September 1568		Tre Kronor (castle), 13 December 1533 son of Gustav I and Catherine of Saxe-Lauenburg	Karin Månsdotter	Died (Poisoned) while imprisoned in Örbyhus Castle, 26 February 1577. Aged 43, buried at Västerås Cathedral
John III (Johan III); 30 September 1568 – 17 November 1592		Stegeborg Castle, Östergötland, 20 December 1537 son of Gustav I and Margaret Leijonhufvud	Catherine Jagellonica (1562 – 1583), Gunilla Bielke (1585–1597)	Tre Kronor (castle), 17 November 1592, aged 54, buried at Uppsala Cathedral
Sigmund (Sigismund); 17 November 1592 – 24 July 1599		Gripsholm Castle, 20 June 1566, son of John III and Catherine Jagellonica of Poland.	Anna of Austria (1592–1598), Constance of Austria (1605–1631)	Warsaw, Poland, 30 April 1632, aged 65, buried at Wawel Cathedral, Kraków, Poland
Charles IX (Karl IX); 22 March 1604 – 30 October 1611 also as regent Duke Charles, 1599–1604		Tre Kronor (castle), 4 October 1550 son of Gustav I and Margaret Leijonhufvud	Maria of Palatinate-Simmern (1579–1589), Christina of Holstein-Gottorp (1592–1611)	Nyköping Castle, 30 October 1611, aged 61, buried at Strängnäs Cathedral
Gustav II Adolph (Gustav II Adolf); 30 October 1611 – 6 November 1632		Tre Kronor (castle), 9 December 1594, son of Charles IX and Christina of Holstein-Gottorp.	Maria Eleonora of Brandenburg	6 November 1632, in the Battle of Lützen, Electorate of Saxony, aged 37, buried in Riddarholmen Church
Christina (Kristina); 6 November 1632 – 6 June 1654		Stockholm, 8 December 1626, daughter of Gustavus Adolphus and Maria Eleonora of Brandenburg	Unmarried	Rome, 19 April 1689, aged 62, buried at St. Peter's Basilica, Vatican City

=== House of Palatinate-Zweibrücken, a branch of the House of Wittelsbach ===
Name	Portrait	Birth	Marriage(s)	Death
Charles X Gustav (Karl X Gustav); 6 June 1654 – 13 February 1660		Nyköping Castle, 8 November 1622, son of John Casimir, Count Palatine of Zweibrücken-Kleeburg and Catharina of Sweden (daughter of Charles IX)	Hedwig Eleonora of Holstein-Gottorp	Gothenburg, 13 February 1660, aged 37, buried in Riddarholmen Church
Charles XI (Karl XI); 13 February 1660 – 5 April 1697		Tre Kronor (castle), 24 November 1655 son of Charles X and Hedwig Eleonora of Holstein-Gottorp	Ulrike Eleonora of Denmark	Tre Kronor (castle), 5 April 1697, aged 41, buried in Riddarholmen Church
Charles XII (Karl XII); 5 April 1697 – 30 November 1718		Tre Kronor (castle), 17 June 1682 son of Charles XI and Ulrika Eleonora the Elder	Unmarried	Fredrikshald, Norway, 30 November 1718, aged 36, buried in Riddarholmen Church
Ulrica Eleanor (Ulrika Eleonora); 5 December 1718 – 29 February 1720		Tre Kronor (castle), 23 January 1688 daughter of Charles XI and Ulrika Eleonora the Elder	Frederick I, Landgrave of Hesse-Kassel	Stockholm, 24 November 1741, aged 53, buried in Riddarholmen Church

=== House of Hesse ===
Name	Portrait	Birth	Marriage(s)	Death
Frederick (Fredrik I av Hessen); 24 March 1720 – 10 September 1721		Kassel, (in today's Germany), 23 April 1676 son of Charles I, Landgrave of Hesse-Kassel and Princess Maria Amalia of Courland	Louise Dorothea of Prussia; Ulrika Eleonora of Sweden	Stockholm, 25 March 1751, aged 74, buried in Riddarholmen Church

On 10 September 1721, Sweden ceded Estonia to the Tsardom of Russia, in the Treaty of Nystad.
