= 1370s in Denmark =

Denmark-related events during the 1300s

Events from the 1370s in Denmark.

== Incumbents ==
- Monarch – Valdemar IV of Denmark (until 1375), Olaf II of Denmark

== Events ==
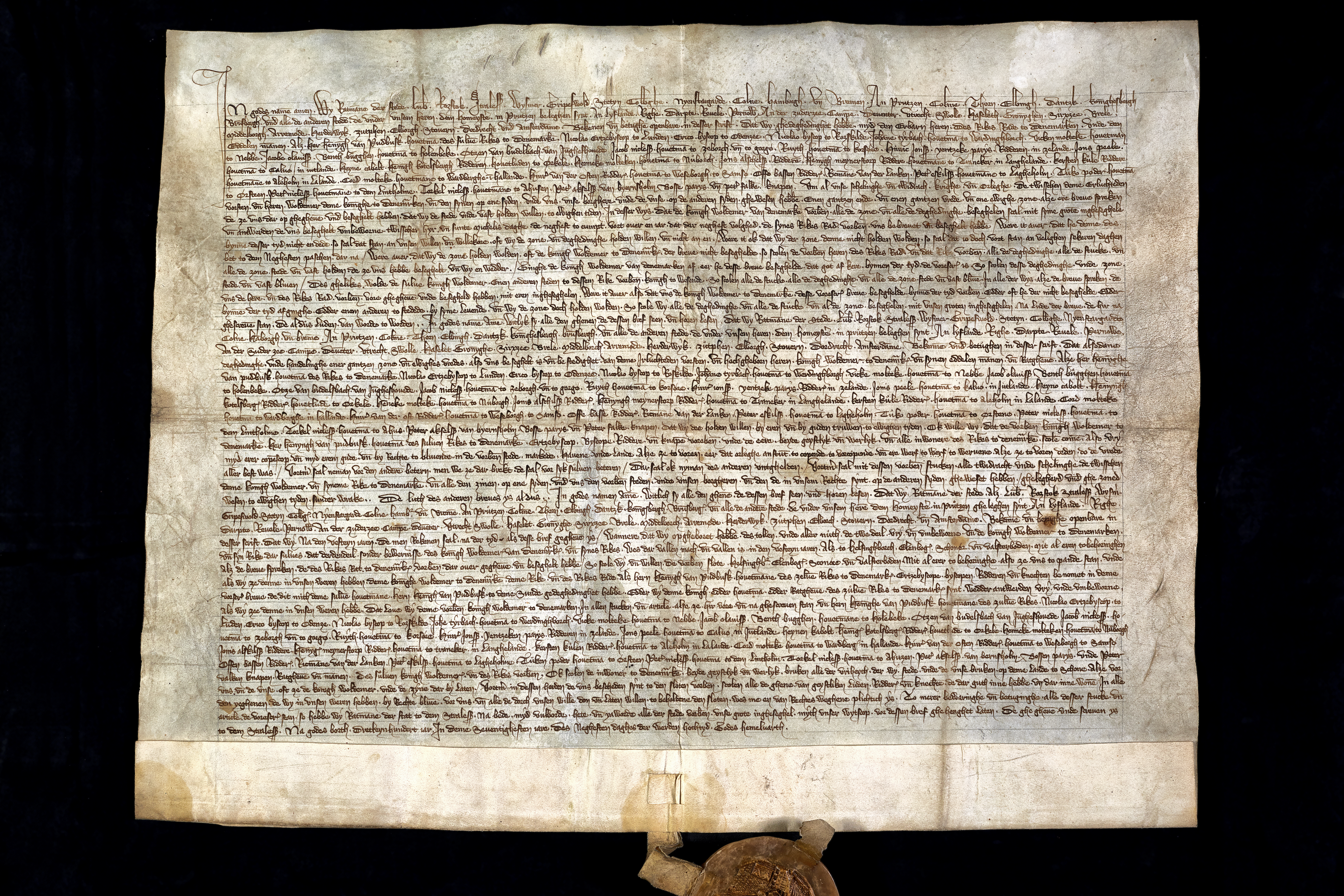
The Treaty of Stralsund.

1370

- 24 May – The Treaty of Stralsund is signed, ending the war between the Hanseatic League and the kingdom of Denmark which had been ongoing since 1361. The treaty stipulated the destruction of Absalon's Castle.

1375

- St. Peter's Church in Næstved is expanded.

== Deaths ==
- 15 June 1370 – Ingeborg of Denmark, princess of Denmark (born 1347)
- 1374 – Helvig of Schleswig, noblewoman (born 1320)
- 24 October 1375 – Valdemar IV of Denmark, King of Denmark (born 1329)
