= Euphemia of Pomerania =

Queen of Denmark from 1320 to 1330

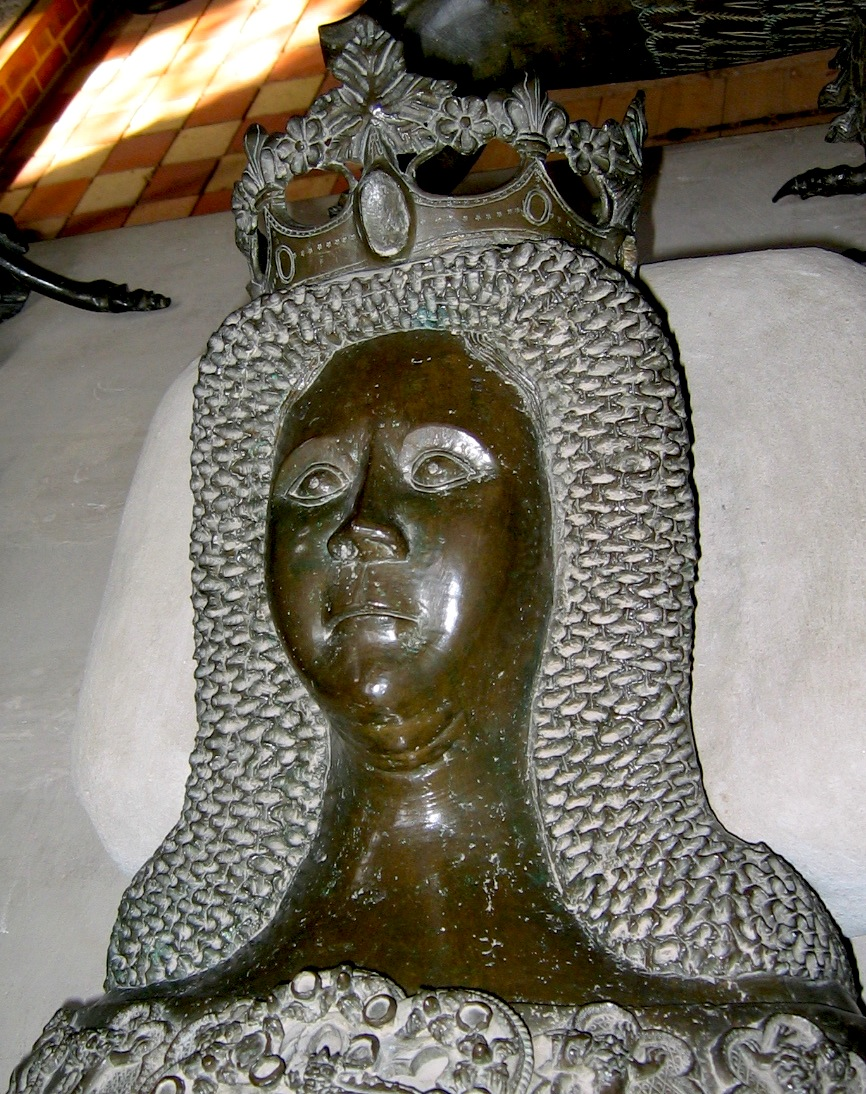
- Euphemia of Pomerania's tomb effigy at Sorø Abbey

Queen consort of Denmark
- Tenure: 1320–1330
- Born: c. 1285
- Died: 26 July 1330
- Burial: Sorø Abbey
- Spouse: Christopher II of Denmark
- Issue: Margaret, Margravine of Brandenburg; Eric Christoffersen; Otto, Duke of Lolland and Estonia; Valdemar IV Atterdag
- House: House of Griffin
- Father: Bogislaw IV, Duke of Pomerania
- Mother: Margarete of Rügen

Euphemia of Pomerania (c. 1285 – 26 July 1330) was Queen consort of Denmark from 1320 to 1330 as the spouse of King Christopher II. She was the daughter of Bogislaw IV, Duke of Pomerania, and his second spouse, Margarete of Rügen.

The period of her reign was chaotic, marked by the dissolution of the kingdom and mounting debts. As a result, few records of her life survive and not much is known about Euphemia. She and Christopher had at least 6 children, including Erik Christoffersen, Otto, Duke of Lolland and Estonia, and King Valdemar IV.

== Marriage and children ==
The exact date of Euphemia's marriage to Christopher is unknown. It is likely that they were married between 1300 and 1304, but they were certainly married sometime before 1307. Their marriage was likely politically motivated, and arranged to provide Christopher with established ties to Pomerania and Rügen through Euphemia's parents. When her husband was elected as king in 1320, he was living in exile with Euphemia in Pomerania.

She witnessed Christopher reclaim the throne for a second time in February 1330, but died soon thereafter on 26 July 1330. She and is buried at Sorø Abbey, where their son Valdemar erected a monumental tomb. Her tomb effigy is presented in royal dress and lies next to her husband and their daughter Agnes.

Euphemia and Christopher had at least six children, including: Margarete (1305–1340), Erik (1307–1331), Otto (c. 1310–1347), and Valdemar (1320–1375). Two of their children died in infancy: Agnes (b. 1312) and Heilwig (c. 1315). Her only surviving daughter, Margarete, married Louis V, Duke of Bavaria in 1324. Their son Erik was Junior King of Denmark until his unexpected death in 1331. Otto became Duke of Lolland and Estonia. Their youngest son, Valdemar, eventually became king in 1340, restoring their family to the throne after reunifying the kingdom of Denmark.

Euphemia of Pomerania House of Griffins Born: circa 1285 Died: 26 July 1330
Danish royalty
Preceded by Ingeborg Magnusdotter of Sweden	Queen consort of Denmark; 1320–1330; Served alongside: Elizabeth of Holstein-Rendsburg (1330–1331)	Succeeded by Helvig of Schleswig
