= Christopher of Denmark =

Christopher of Denmark – Danish: Christoffer - may refer to:

- Christopher I of Denmark
- Christopher II of Denmark
- Christopher III of Denmark, better known as Christopher of Bavaria
- Christopher, Duke of Lolland
- Prince Christopher of Greece and Denmark
- Christopher, Duke of Schleswig, illegitimate son Valdemar I of Denmark
- Christopher Eriksen, son of Eric IV of Denmark who died young
