= Otto, Duke of Lolland and Estonia =

Danish prince (c.1310 - 1346)

Otto of Denmark

Duke of Lolland
- Reign: 1321–1334
- Successor: John III, Count of Holstein-Plön

Duke of Estonia
- Reign: 1332-38
- Predecessor: Ingeborg of Norway
- Successor: Valdemar III of Denmark
- Born: Otto Christoffersen c. 1310
- Died: after 1346
- House: Estridsen
- Father: Christopher II of Denmark
- Mother: Euphemia of Pomerania

Otto of Denmark (c. 1310 – after 1346) (Danish: Otto Christoffersen) was a Danish prince who was also Duke of Lolland and Estonia.

He was the second son of King Christopher II of Denmark and Euphemia of Pomerania. In his childhood his older brother Eric had been elected as junior king of Denmark. Otto was given the titles Duke of Lolland and Estonia and was expected to expand the Danish conquest of Estonia acquired during Livonian Crusade.

His father and brother were deposed in 1326 and restored three years later on the condition his father signed a charter that gave him little to no power while the Danish nobles and the counts of Holstein ruled behind the scene and mortgaged most of the kingdom. His brother Eric predeceased both Otto and his father, fighting to rid Denmark from the rule of the counts of Holstein. King Christopher died in 1332, leaving Otto and his younger brother Valdemar as his only sons and potential heirs to the throne.

The Danish nobles for some reason decided not to elect a successor. In 1332, Otto made an attempt to win the Danish crown, but was defeated by Count Gerhard III of Holstein on Taphed at Viborg on 7 October 1334. He was held prisoner in the Segeberg Castle.

Upon his father's death and his failed attempt to seize the throne, Denmark ceased being a formal kingdom, and for the next eight years it was subjected by various mortgagees to German military rule. His younger brother would later regain Denmark from the Holsteiners and succeed as Valdemar IV of Denmark. Once Valdemar became king in 1340, Otto was released on the condition that he surrender his claim to the throne. Otto subsequently went to Germany, and joined the Teutonic Order in 1346. The Order bought his duchy in the same year, and no further information is recorded about him.

Otto is the hero of Bernhard Severin Ingemann's novel, Prins Otto af Danmark og Hans Samtid (Prince Otto of Denmark and his Time, 1835).

Preceded by Ingeborg of Norway	Duke of Estonia; 1332-1338	Succeeded by Valdemar II
