= Gurre, Denmark =

Gurre
- Village
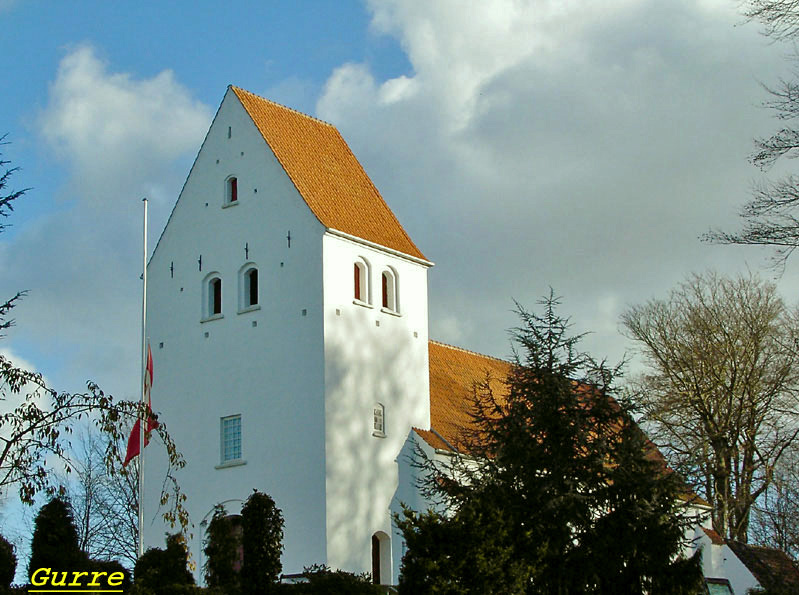
- Gurre Church

- Location in Denmark
- Coordinates: 56°1′14″N 12°31′8″E
- Country: Denmark
- Region: Capital Region of Denmark
- Municipality: Helsingør Municipality

Population (2026)
  - Total: 422
- Time zone: UTC+1 (CET)
  - Summer (DST): UTC+2 (CEST)

Gurre is a village located five kilometres west of Helsingør and 42 kilometres north of central Copenhagen, Denmark. It is located on the east side of Gurre Lake and is almost surrounded by woodland. As of 1 January 2026, its population was 422. It is most known for the ruin of Gurre Castle.

== History ==
A settlement developed outside the Gurre Castle, probably some time during the beginning of the 14th century since the locality is referred to as Gurffue ("Gurre houses") in 1336. In 1361, King Valdemar IV of Denmark asked for permission the establish St. Jacob's Chapel outside the castle. The current village emerged at a site just east of the castle after it was abandoned and fell into neglect in the years after the Reformation. In 1791, it consisted of six farm and four other houses. Gurre School was built in 1821 and transferred to the civil parish of Tikøb in 1842.

== Landmarks ==
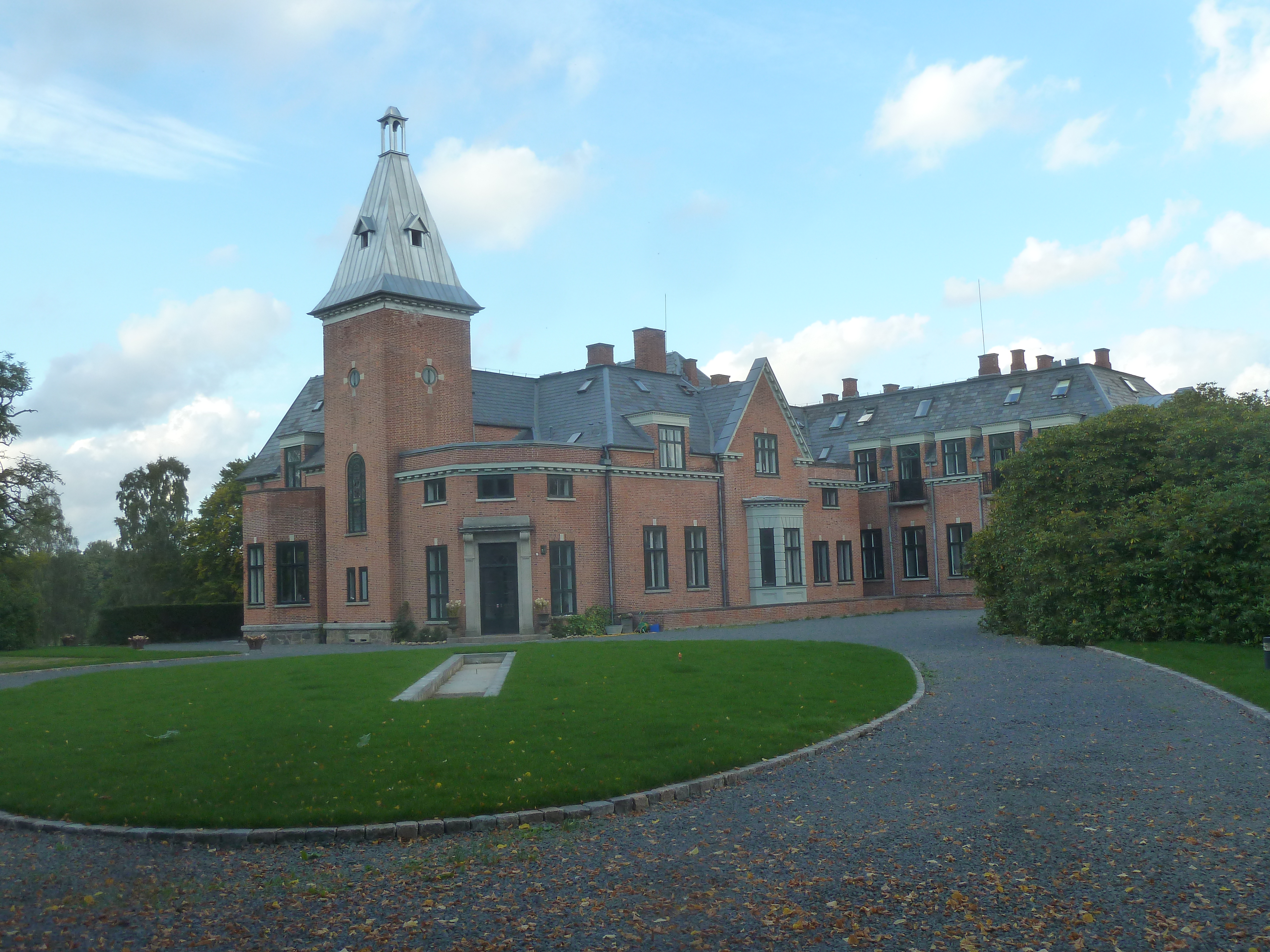
Gurrehus

Gurre Church is from 1918 and was designed by Carl Brummer. Gurre parish was not disjoined from Tikøb parish until 2010.

Gurrehus traces its name back to the 16th century and was from 1713 home to the local forester. The estate was owned by the crown until 1779. Later owners include Prince George of Greece who expanded and adapted the house with the assistance of the architect Gotfred Tvede.

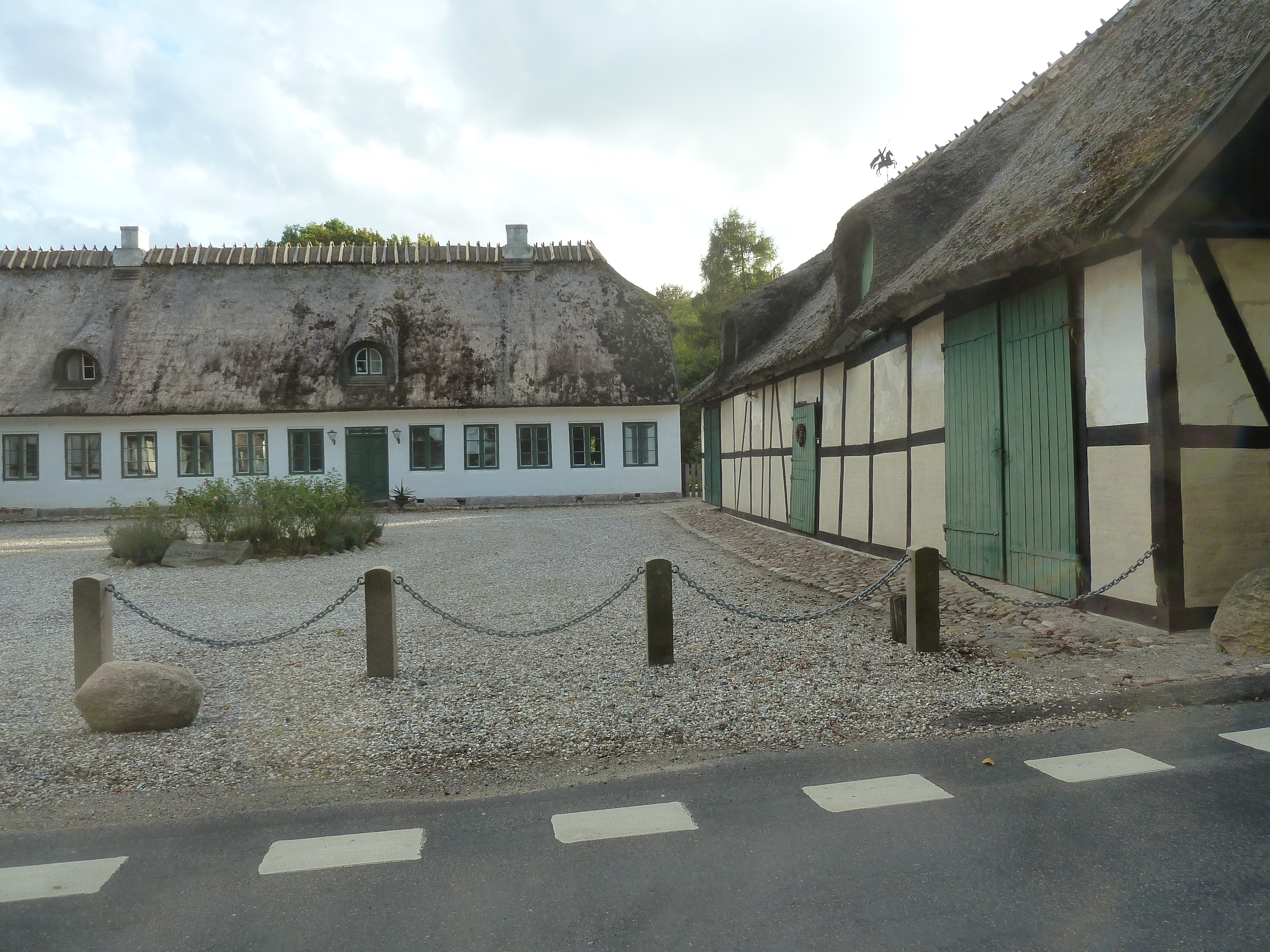
Valdemarslund

Located across the street from Gurrehus, Valdemarslund is from the 1800s and has also served as residence for the forester. It consists of three detached wings and a small half-timbered building in the garden. The main wing was extended in about 1850. The complex was listed in 1982.

The country estate Ørsholt is today owned by Peter Beier, a well-known Danish chocolatier, who runs his company from the premises.

== Surroundings ==
The village of Gurre is almost completely surrounded by the small woods Nyrup Hegn, Teglstrup Hegn, Horserød Hegn, Gurre Vang and Krogenberg Hegn. Gurre Lake has a highly irregular shape, a total area of 2.4 km^{2} and a depth of 2–5.5 metres. Originally a very clear-watered oligotroph lake, it now suffers from severe eutrophication.

== Bibliography ==
- Vivian Etting, Lone Hvass, Charlotte Boje Andersen: Gurre slot: kongeborg og sagnskat. 2003.
- Ditlevsen, Stephen (editor): Gurre. Forsvarets Center for Lederskab, Gurrehus. 1992. Pages 7-20: Lars Bjørn Madsen: Lidt om landsbyen Gurre.
