= Duke of Lolland =

Danish royal title

The Duke of Lolland (Danish: Hertug af Lolland) was a Danish title first created for Canute, Duke of Estonia in 1249. The title was frequently held by princes of the Danish Royal family in conjunction with the Duchy of Estonia.

== List of dukes of Lolland ==
| Ruler | Born | Reign | Death | House | Notes |
|---|---|---|---|---|---|
| Canute, Duke of Estonia | 1207 | 1249–1260 | 1260 | Estridsen | Created Duke of Lolland, Son of Valdemar II of Denmark |
| Otto, Duke of Lolland and Estonia | 1310 | 1321–1334 | after 1346 | Estridsen | Second son of Christopher II of Denmark, Created Duke of Lolland |
| John III, Count of Holstein-Plön | 1297 | 1334–1340 | 1369 | House of Schauenburg | As lord of Lolland |
| Christopher, Duke of Lolland | 1341 | 1359–1363 | 1363 | Estridsen | Created Duke of Lolland, son of Valdemar IV of Denmark |
