= Gurre Castle =

Ruins of a royal castle located in North Zealand, Denmark

Coordinates: 56°01′10″N 12°30′19″E

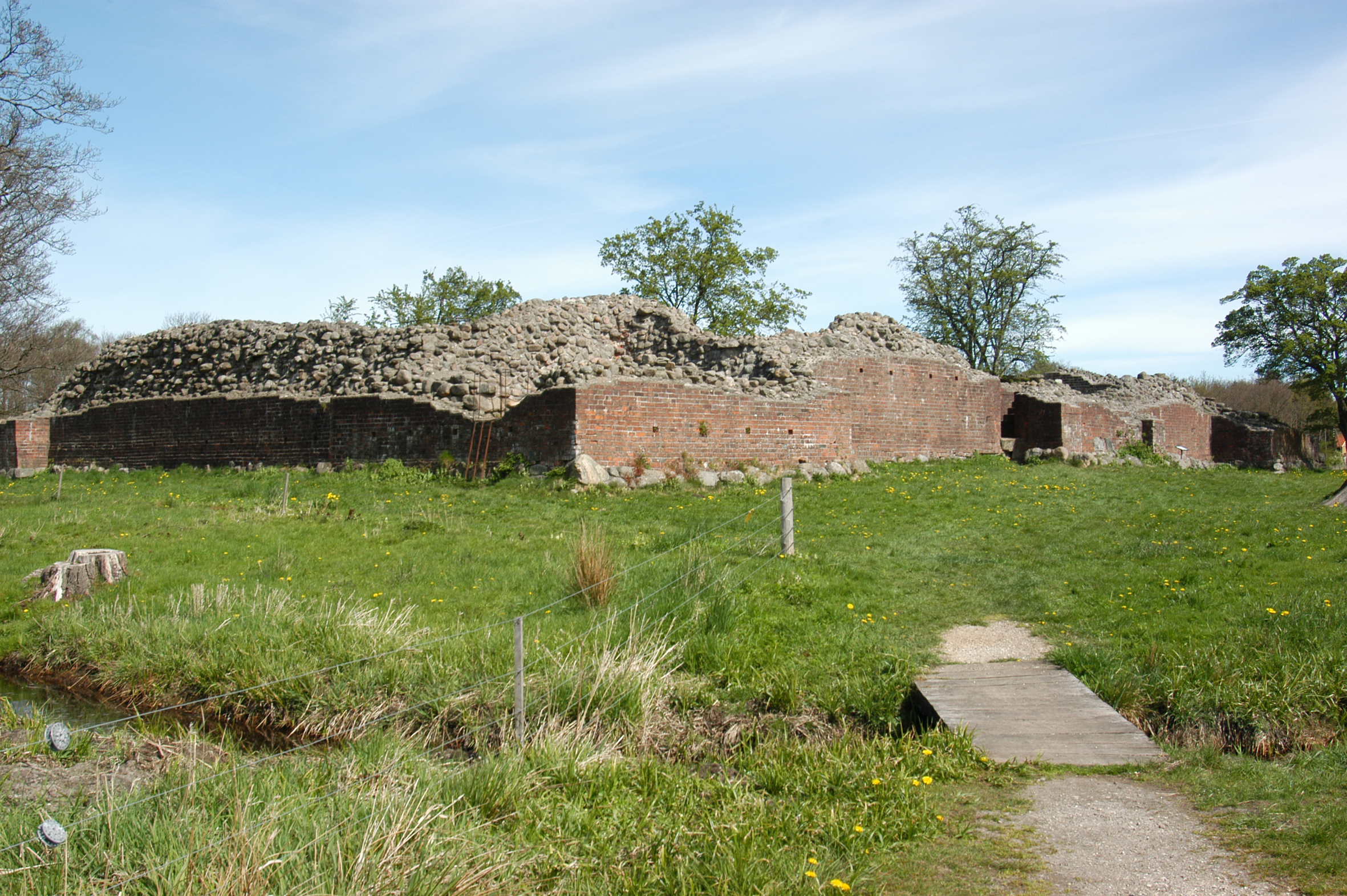
Ruins of Gurre Castle, 2007

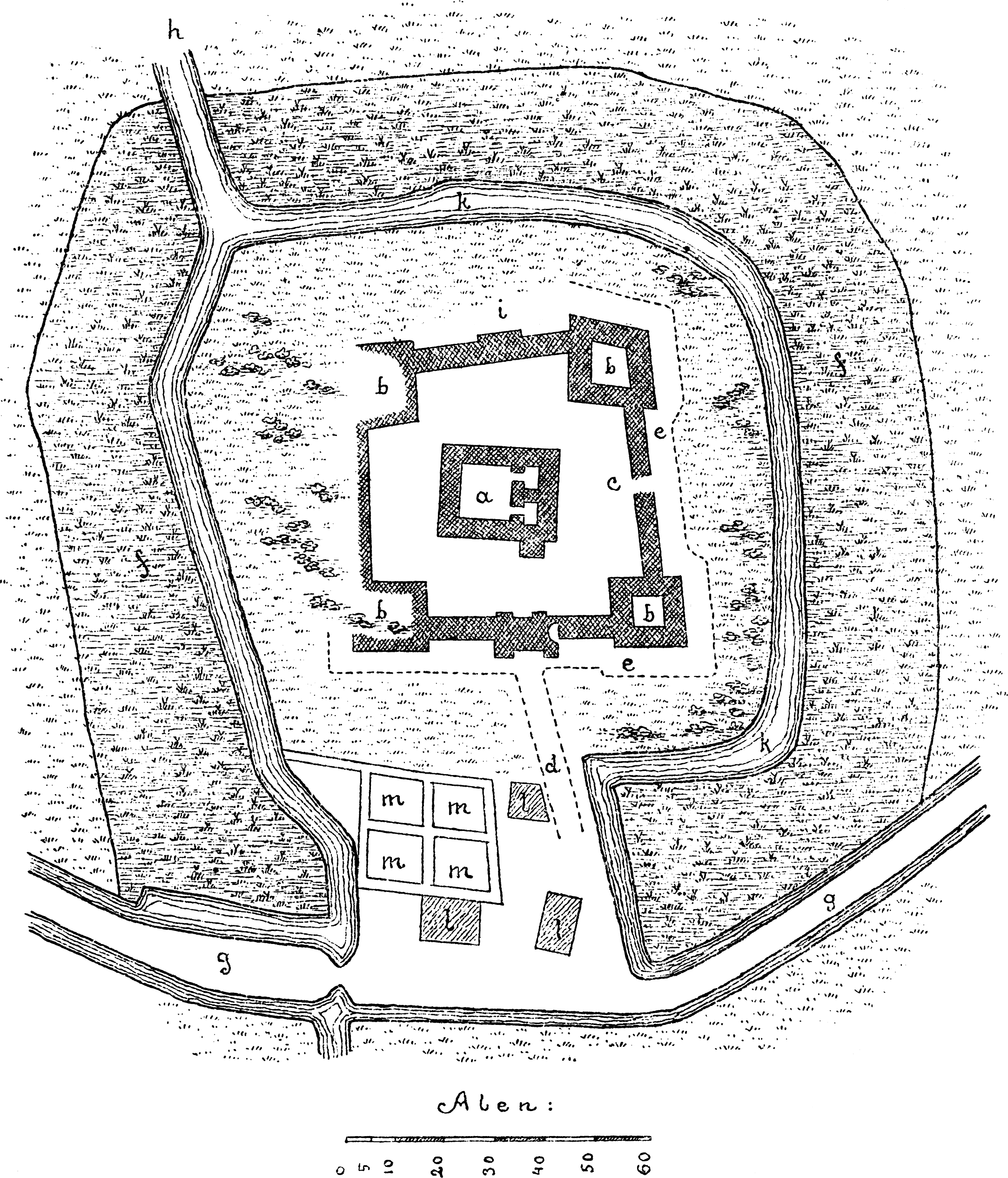
Sketch of the ruins, 1889

Gurre Castle (Danish: Gurre Slot) was a royal castle situated in North Zealand, Denmark. Its ruins lie on the outskirts of Helsingør, close to the town of Gurre near Gurre Sø. The ruins have been excavated and are now restored.

== History ==
The castle was built in the 12th century. Four towers and a perimeter wall were added in the 1350s. It was first mentioned in court chronicles in 1364, when Pope Urban V sent a gift of relics to its chapel.

King Valdemar Atterdag died in the castle in 1375. Many stories, ballads, and poems have been made about Valdemar. The castle is associated with a legend about King Valdemar, his love for his beautiful mistress Tove Lille, who according to tradition stayed for a long time at Gurre Castle, and the resulting jealousy of his Queen Helvig of Schleswig.

Over the centuries, this core saga was enriched by other legends, eventually growing into a national myth of Denmark. The myth was put into poetical form by the Danish novelist and poet Jens Peter Jacobsen (1847–1885). A German translation of his poems forms the text of the cantata Gurre-Lieder by Austrian composer Arnold Schoenberg (1874–1951).

== Excavations ==
A partial excavation of the ruin took place in 1817. This was done at the initiative of Frederik Anthon Adam von der Maase. In 1835, a major excavation of the ruins took place, during which the remains were surveyed and mapped. Additional research took place in the 1890s. In 1921, the remains of a stone building were exposed. In the years 1936 to 1939, a restoration of the ruin was carried out.
