= Christopher, Duke of Lolland =

14th-century duke of Lolland and heir-apparent of Denmark

Christopher of Denmark
- Duke of Lolland
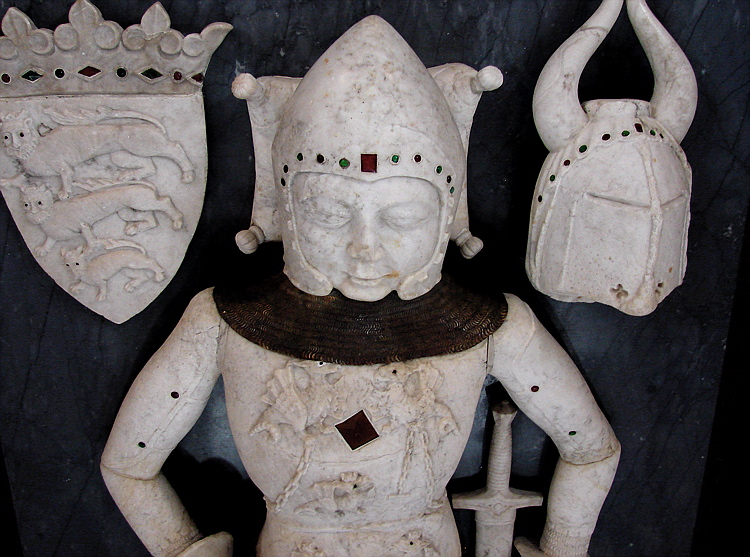
- Effigy of Christopher from the remains of his tomb in Roskilde Cathedral
- Born: 1341; Tikøb, Helsingør, Denmark
- Died: 11 June 1363 (22 years); Copenhagen, Denmark
- Burial: Roskilde Cathedral, Zealand, Denmark
Names
- Christoffer Valdemarsen
- House: House of Estridsen
- Father: Valdemar IV of Denmark
- Mother: Helvig of Schleswig

Christopher (Danish: Christoffer Valdemarsen; 1341 – 11 June 1363), Duke of Lolland, was the son of King Valdemar IV of Denmark and his wife, Helvig of Schleswig. Christopher was appointed duke in 1359 and also was selected to succeed as king.

He was first mentioned in 1354–55, and in 1358 was sent by his father to Nyborg to negotiate with representatives of the rebellious Jutes. He became involved in government decisions, and was appointed Duke of Lolland. He also entitled himself as the True Heir of Danes and Slavs. Christopher actively participated in the war for reconquest of Scania which his father had initiated. Christopher was injured during the Battle of Helsingborg in 1362. German chronicles are not clear about what weapon inflicted the prince's mortal wound, but according to Swedish Henrik Smith's chronicle from the early 16th century Christopher was hit by a rock while fighting at sea. According to Nordisk familjebok, Christopher was shot in the head with a rock and subsequently suffered from a mental disorder.

Christopher died from an illness the following year in Copenhagen. Although his death is often attributed to his war wounds it is unknown to what extent his injuries actually contributed to the illness.

Instead of being buried at Sorø Abbey with his father and mother, he was buried in Roskilde Cathedral with his sister Margaret I of Denmark. His tomb was originally commissioned in Central Europe, and depicts the alabaster effigy of a young knight in full armor studded with jewels and surrounded by the heraldic shields of Denmark, Halland and Lolland. The tomb is empty as the prince is probably buried beneath the church floor. The alabaster tomb visible today was restored in 1879 by sculptor Vilhelm Bissen from fragmentary pieces after being destroyed during the Reformation.

== Other sources ==
- Jörgensen Ellen: Valdemar Atterdag. Utvalg af kilder. Copenhagen 1911.
- Gottfrid Carlsson (1945). Medeltidens nordiska unionstanke. Stockholm: Gebers. pp. 33–34.
- Nordisk familjebok (1911), band 14, s. 1453–1454 (länk)
