= Eric Christoffersen =

Junior King of Denmark (1321–1326, 1329–1332)

Junior King of Denmark
- Reign: 1321–1326; 1329–1332
- Coronation: 15 August 1324
- Senior king: Christopher II
- Born: c. 1307
- Died: late 1331 or early 1332; Kiel
- Burial: Sorø Abbey; later St. Bendt's Church
- Spouse: Elizabeth of Holstein-Rendsburg
- House: Estridsen
- Father: Christopher II of Denmark
- Mother: Euphemia of Pomerania

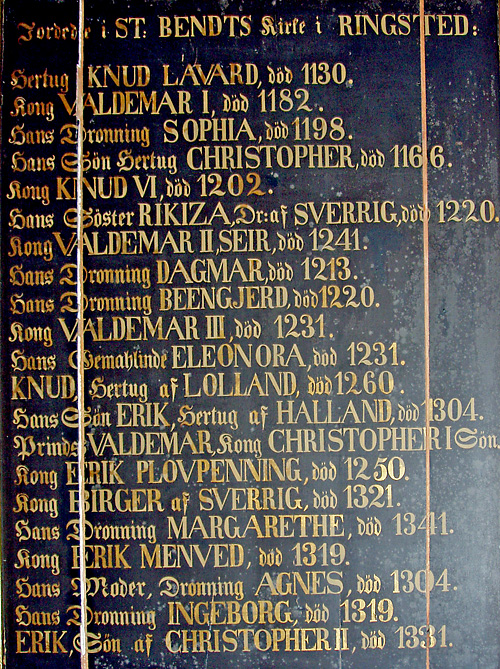
List of burials in St. Bendt's Church, Ringsted, with Eric Christoffersen at the bottom.

Eric Christoffersen (c. 1307 – c. 1332) (Danish: Erik Christoffersen) was king of Denmark from 1321 until his death, jointly with his father, King Christopher II. He was a member of the House of Estridsen. In Danish, he is sometimes called "Erik, elected king."

Eric was the eldest son of King Christopher II and Euphemia of Pomerania. In 1321, he was elected king and crowned alongside his father as his junior co-ruler on 15 August 1324. In 1325, his father asked him to halt the Counts of Holstein and their allies, but was deserted by his troops, taken prisoner and confined in Haderslev Castle. His father was forced to abdicate and go into exile, while the 12-year-old Duke Valdemar of Southern Jutland was made king of Denmark under the regent, Count Gerhard III of Holstein. After a period of chaos in the "magnates’ republic" of Denmark, King Christopher was restored as a puppet monarch in 1329 through the help of his half-brother Count John III. Eric was released in 1330, on the condition he married Elizabeth of Holstein-Rendsburg, dowager duchess of Saxe-Lauenburg and sister of his father's enemy, Count Gerhard III, by whom he had no children. The marriage was dissolved the next year as war again erupted between his father and Count John III and his brother-in-law Gerhard III.

He predeceased his father, fighting in the battles, which subsequently broke out between his father and Holstein. On 30 November 1331, Eric was defeated at the battle at Danevirke, but managed to escape to Kiel, where he died of his battle wounds, a few months afterward, either in late 1331 or early 1332. Eric was buried at Sorø Abbey, later his remains were transported to the St. Bendt's Church. Upon his father's death in the same year, Denmark ceased being a formal kingdom, and for the next eight years it was subdued by various mortgagees to German military rule. His younger brother would later regain Denmark from the Holsteiners and succeed as Valdemar IV of Denmark.

Eric Christoffersen House of Estridsen Born: 1307 Died: 1332
Regnal titles
Preceded by Christopher II as sole king	King of Denmark; 1321–1326 with Christopher II	Succeeded by Valdemar III
Preceded by Valdemar III	King of Denmark; 1329–1332 with Christopher II	Succeeded by Christopher II as sole king
