= Elizabeth of Holstein-Rendsburg =

Queen of Denmark from 1330 to 1331

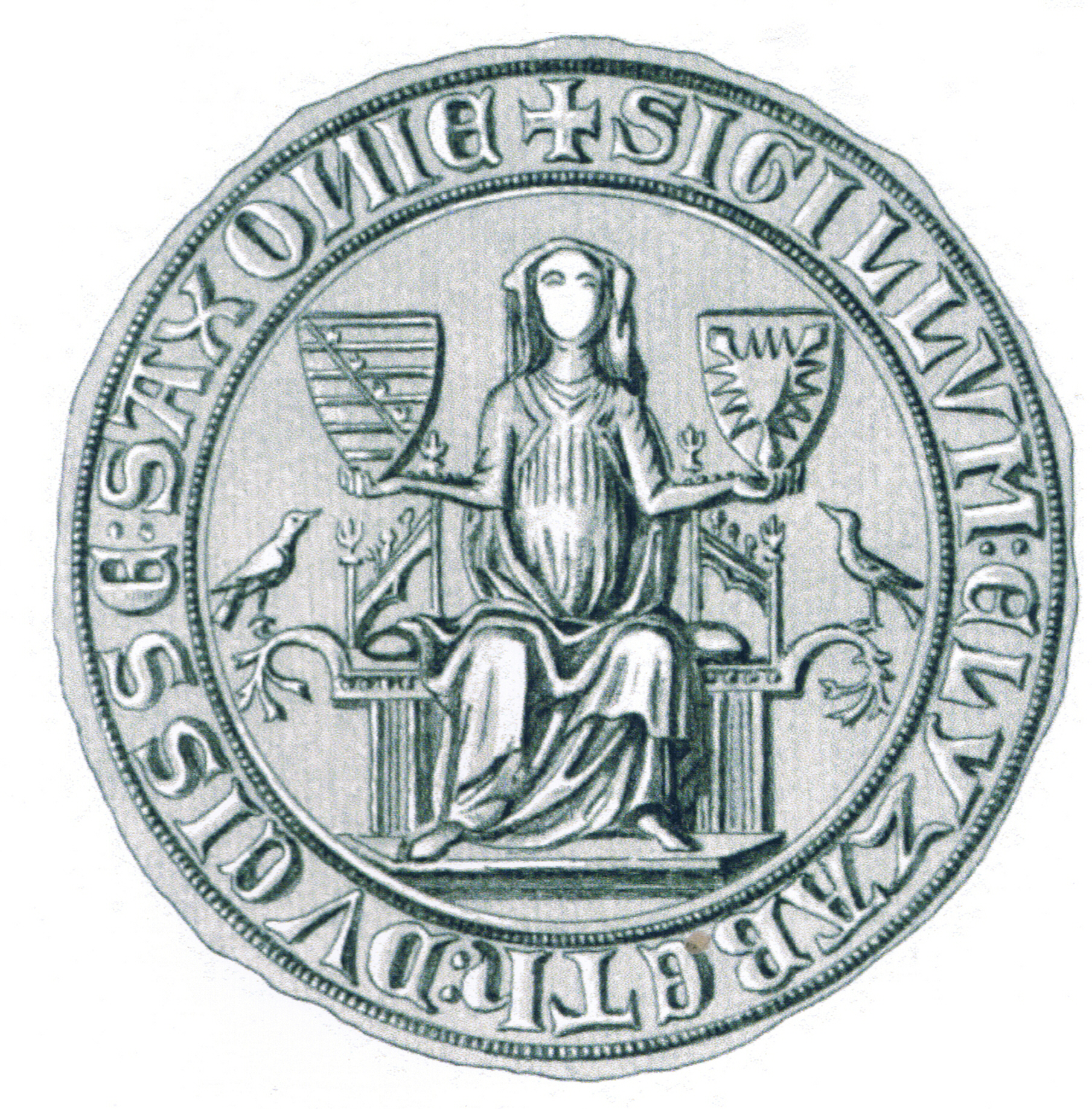
Seal of Elizabeth of Holstein-Rendsburg

Elizabeth of Holstein-Rendsburg (c. 1300 – before 1340) was the regent of the Duchy of Saxe-Lauenburg during the minority of her son from 1321 until 1330. She was by two consecutive marriages, duchess of Saxe-Lauenburg and queen of Denmark by marriage (1330–1331) to Eric Christoffersen, son of Christopher II of Denmark.

== Life ==
A member of the House of Schauenburg, Elizabeth was the daughter of Henry I, Count of Holstein-Rendsburg, and Heilwig of Bronckhorst. Her first husband was John II, Duke of Saxe-Lauenburg, whom she married in c. 1315. Elizabeth gave birth to a son who succeeded her husband as Albert IV, Duke of Saxe-Lauenburg, but she ruled the duchy as regent due to his minority.

In 1330, Duchess Elizabeth married Eric, junior king of Denmark, the son of her brother Gerhard's enemy, King Christopher II of Denmark. The couple had no children and the marriage was dissolved the next year. Her former husband died in war with Holstein in 1332.

Elizabeth of Holstein-Rendsburg House of Schauenburg Born: c. 1300 Died: before 1340
Royal titles
Preceded by Agnes of Habsburg	Duchess consort of Saxe-Lauenburg; 1315 – 1322; Served alongside: Elisabeth of Pomerania	Succeeded by Beata of Schwerin
Preceded by Euphemia of Pomerania as sole consort	(Junior) Queen consort of Denmark; 1330 – 1331; Served alongside: Euphemia of Pomerania (for no more than a few months of 1330)	Succeeded by Helvig of Schleswig (1340-1374)
