= Vordingborg Castle =

Ruins of a castle in Denmark

Coordinates: 55°00′26″N 11°54′45″E

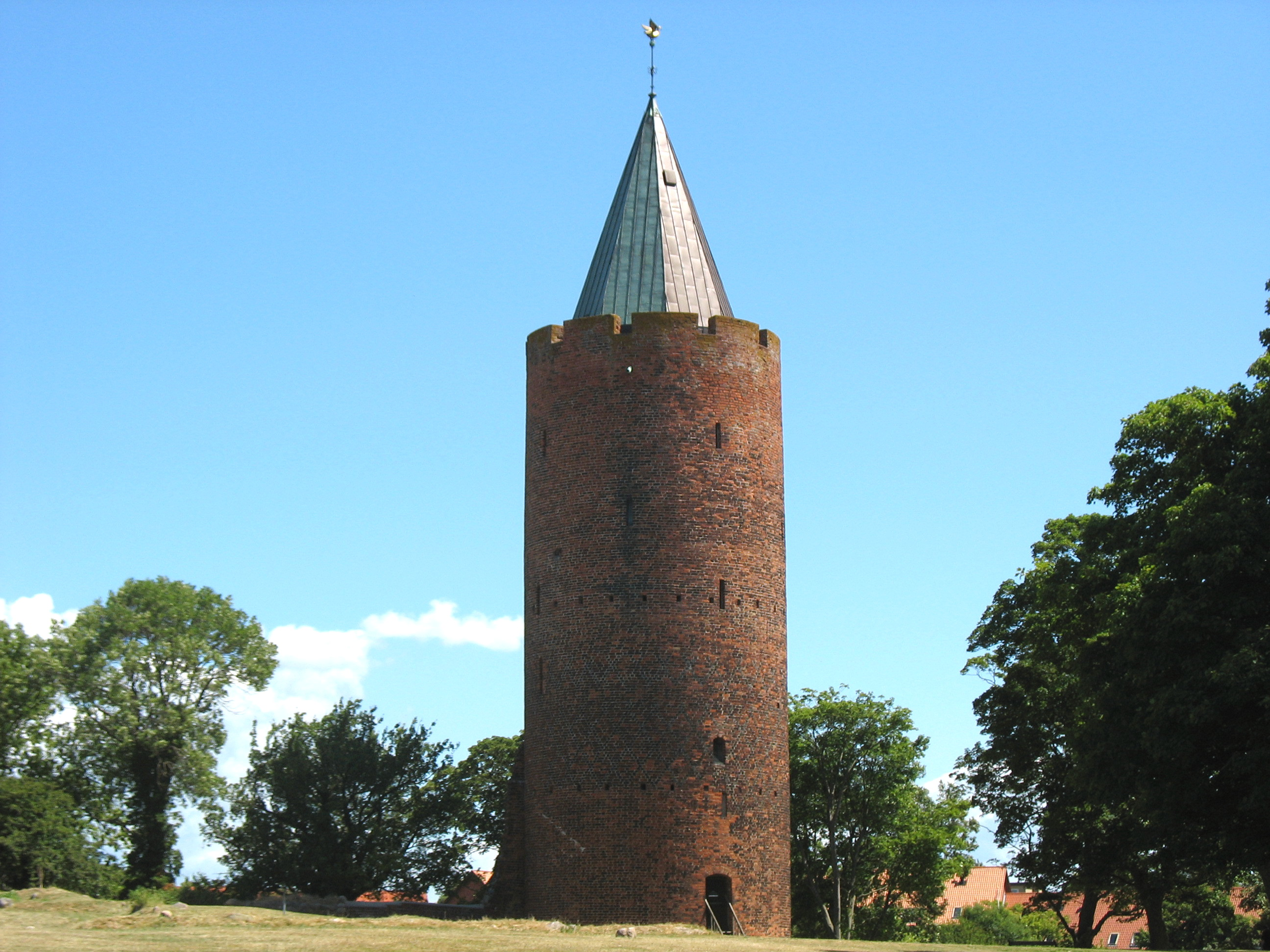
Goose tower

The Vordingborg Castle ruins (Vordingborg Slotsruin) are located in the town of Vordingborg, Denmark and are the town's most famous attraction.

== History ==
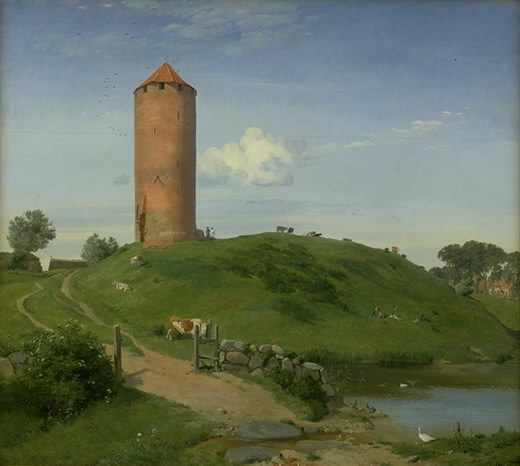
Gåsetårnet i Vordingborg Johan Thomas Lundbye (1842)

The castle was built in 1175 by King Valdemar I of Denmark as a defensive fortress, and as a base from which to launch raids against the German coast. His half-brother built another castle in a remote location, which is now Copenhagen. King Valdemar II similarly used the castle for expansion into the Baltic, and in 1241, it was where he created the reformed legal system, the Code of Jutland. By the time of King Valdemar IV, the castle had nine towers and a defensive wall, 800 metres long.

Large parts of the castle were demolished after the Swedish wars had ended, in order to construct a palace for Prince George, son of King Frederick III. The prince never took up residence, and the palace too was demolished in the 18th century. Three manors were constructed nearby, including Iselingen, which became a meeting place for many leading artists and scientists during the 19th century.

== Current usage ==
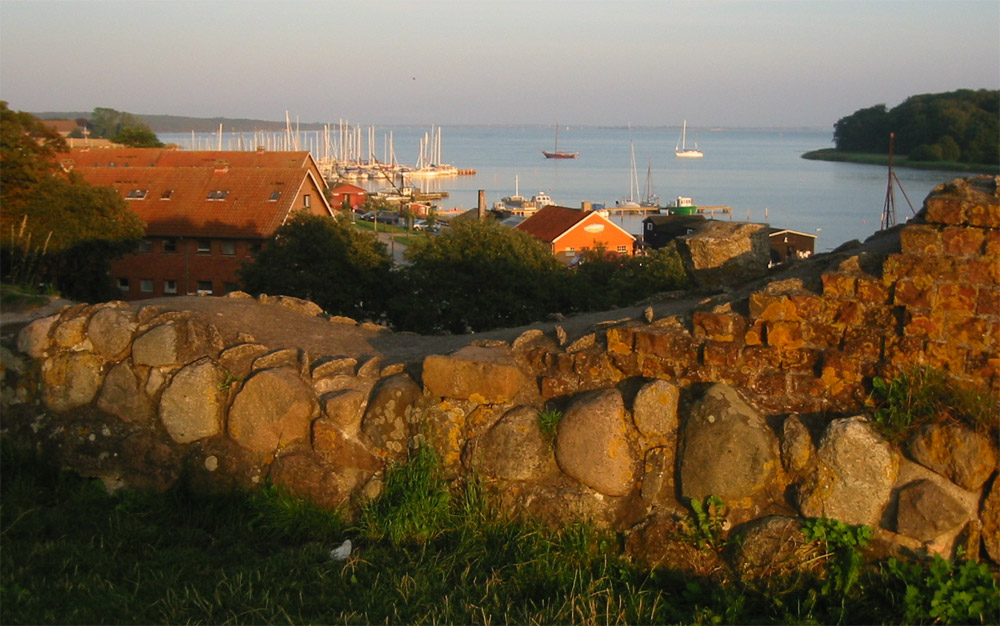
View from Castle walls

Today Vordingborg Castle is a ruin, although parts of the fourteenth-century curtain walls remain. The only fully preserved part of the castle, the 26-meter-tall (85 ft) Goose Tower (Gåsetårnet), is the symbol of the city. The name comes from the golden goose that perches on top of the tower's spire. Although legend has it that Valdemar Atterdag used the symbol to taunt the Hanseatic League, the truth is the goose was first erected in 1871. The tower was transferred into the national trust on December 24, 1808, and was thus the first, protected historic monument in Denmark.

Next to the castle is a botanical garden and also a museum. A larger museum is planned which will include information on all of Denmark's historic castles. Excavations of the castle ruins continue. Regular archaeological digs take place here. Many of the finds are displayed in an exhibition at the Danish Castle Centre (Danmarks Borgcenter).

In 2004, the National Bank of Denmark issued a 20 DKK commemorative coin for the tower.

== See also ==
- List of castles and palaces in Denmark
- Tourism in Denmark
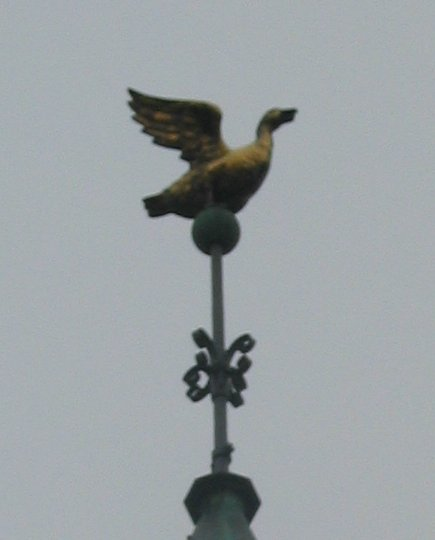
Goose Tower Spire

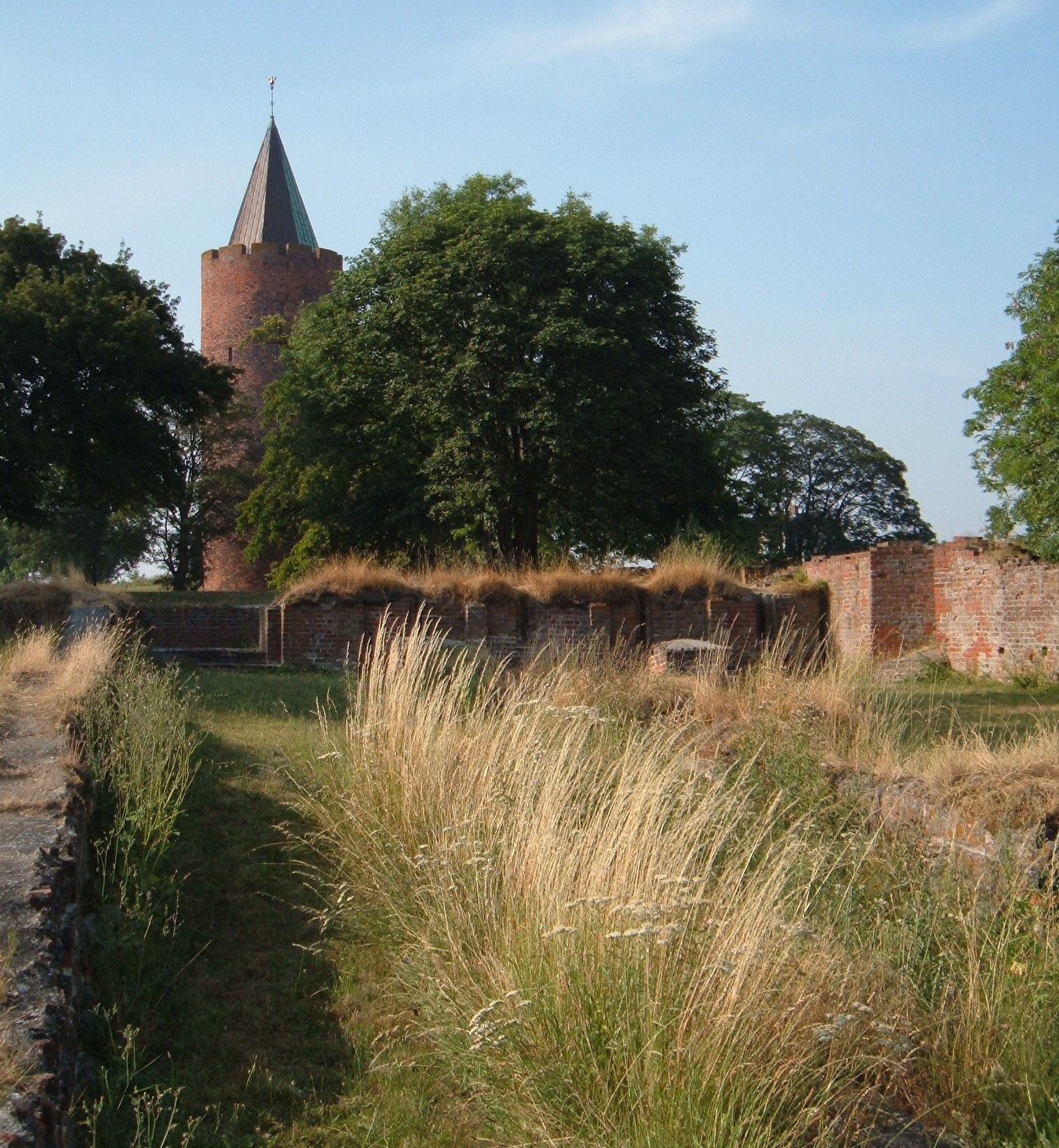
Castle Ruins
