= Olaf II of Denmark =

King of Denmark, Norway (1370–1387)

Olaf II and IV
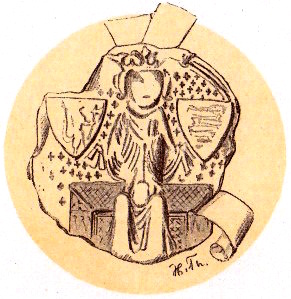
- Olaf as depicted on his royal seal, with the shield of Norway (at his right) and Denmark (at his left)

King of Denmark (as Olaf II)
- Reign: 3 May 1376 – 3 August 1387
- Predecessor: Valdemar IV
- Successor: Margaret I

King of Norway (as Olaf IV)
- Reign: 29 July 1380 – 3 August 1387
- Predecessor: Haakon VI
- Successor: Margaret I
- Born: December 1370; Akershus Castle, Oslo
- Died: 3 August 1387 (aged 16); Falsterbo Castle, Falsterbo
- Burial: Sorø Abbey, Sorø, Denmark
Names
- Danish: Oluf Håkonsen; Norwegian: Olav Håkonsson
- House: Bjälbo
- Father: Haakon VI of Norway
- Mother: Margaret I of Denmark

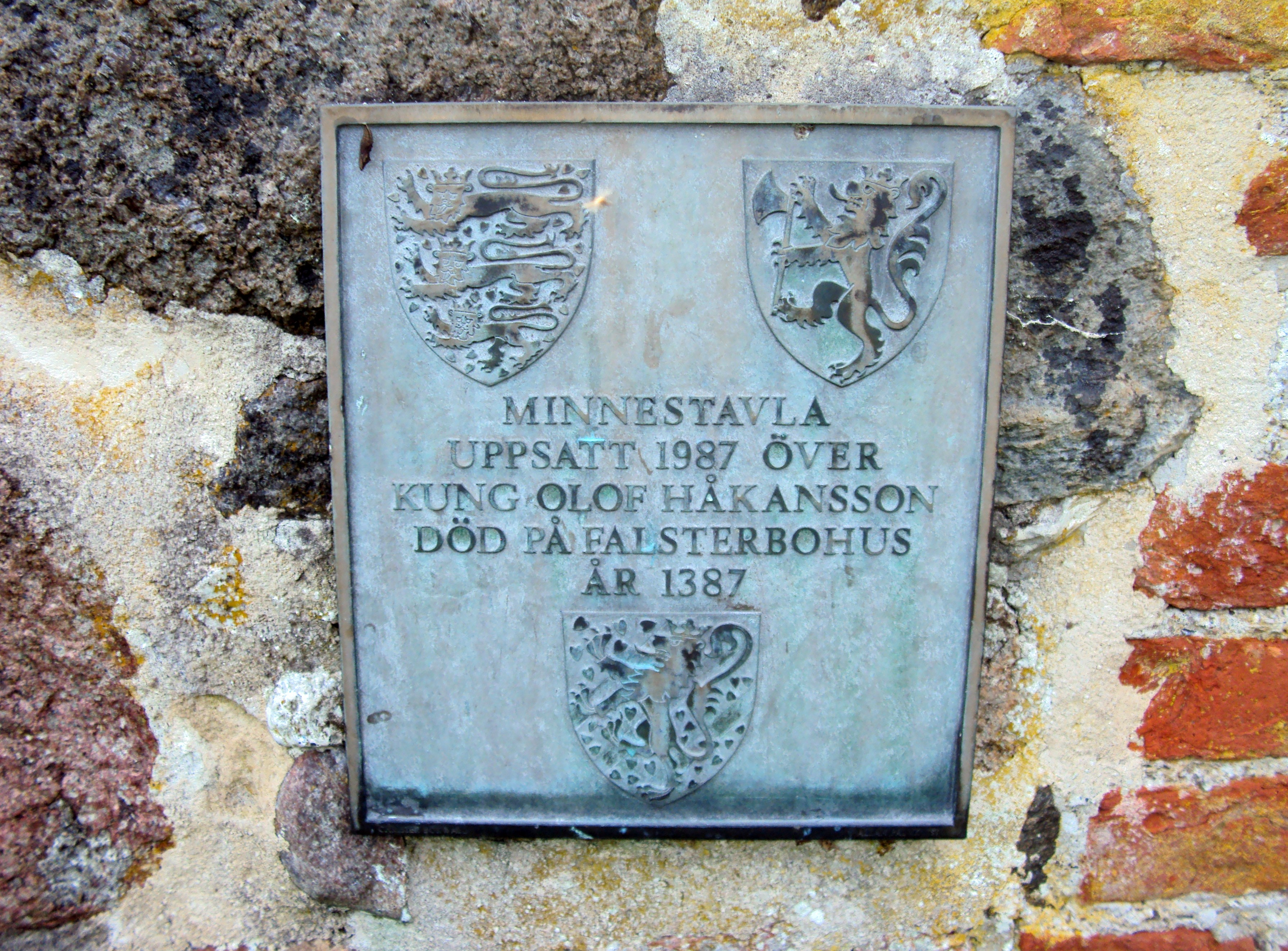
Memorial plate commemorating King Olaf at the site of his death.

Olaf Hákonsson (December 1370 – 3 August 1387) was King of Denmark as Oluf II (though occasionally referred to as Oluf III) and King of Norway as Olav IV. He acceded to the Danish throne in 1376 through his maternal lineage and inherited the Norwegian crown from his father, Haakon VI, in 1380.

== Reign ==
When his grandfather Valdemar IV of Denmark died, Olaf was just five years old. He was proclaimed king of Denmark by a Danehof in Slagelse the following year. His mother, Queen Margaret, was to serve as regent due to his young age. His proclamation included the title "true heir of Sweden" added at his mother's insistence since both his father and his paternal grandfather, Magnus IV, had been kings of Sweden until they were forced to abdicate. Olaf was hailed as king in Scania, including the towns controlled by the Hanseatic league since the Treaty of Stralsund in 1370. Queen Margaret signed a coronation charter on behalf of Olaf, who was too young to rule until he came of age at fifteen. In the charter Olaf agreed to meet with the Danehof at least once a year and return properties his grandfather Valdemar IV had confiscated during his reign.

Olaf became king of Norway on his father's death in 1380. Even when Olaf reached his majority in 1385, his mother ruled through him. With his ascent to the Norwegian throne, Denmark and Norway were thus united in a personal union ruled from Denmark. Denmark and Norway would have the same king, with the exception of short interregna, until the dissolution of Denmark–Norway and forced union of Norway with Sweden, as a result of the Treaty of Kiel in 1814.

== Death and aftermath ==
Olaf died unexpectedly at Falsterbohus in August 1387 at age 16. He was buried at Sorø Abbey on the Danish island of Zealand where his grandfather and, later, his mother, were also buried. Rumors immediately arose that Olaf had been poisoned. Following her son's death, Margaret united all three Scandinavian kingdoms in a personal union. After Olaf, no Norwegian king was to be born on Norwegian soil for more than 550 years, until Harald V, born in 1937, became king in 1991. Olaf's death was also the end of the male line of the House of Bjälbo. In 2015 Jørgen Lange Thomsen, a forensic scientist, proposed a theory Olaf II died from Brugada syndrome.

In 1402, he was impersonated by the False Olaf.

== Other sources ==
- Albrectsen, Esben Danmark-Norge 1380–1814. B. 1 Fællesskabet bliver til : 1380–1536 (Danske historiske forening. 1981)

Olav IV/Olaf II House of Bjälbo Born: 1370 Died: 23 August 1387
Regnal titles
Preceded by Valdemar IV	King of Denmark; 1376–1387	Succeeded by Margaret I
Preceded by Haakon VI	King of Norway; 1380–1387	Succeeded by Margaret I
