= Helvig of Schleswig =

Queen of Denmark from 1340 to 1374

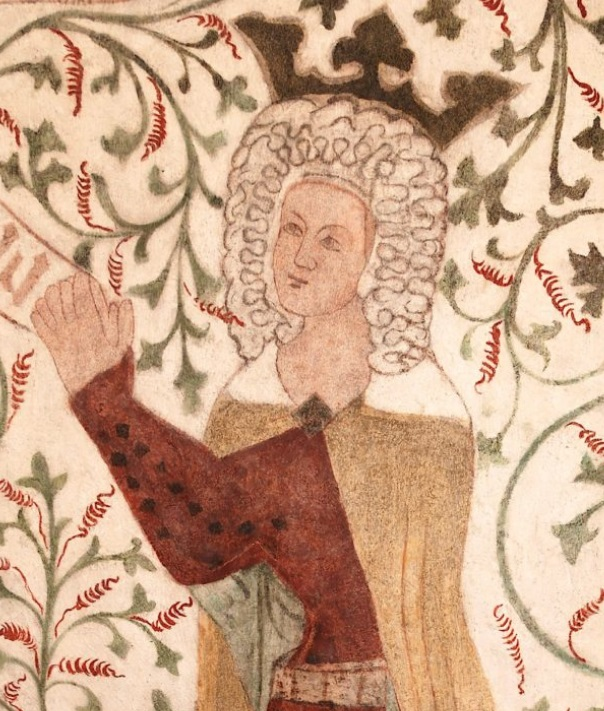
- Queen Helvig shown on a contemporary fresco in St. Peter's Church, Næstved (Sankt Peders Kirke).

Queen consort of Denmark
- Tenure: 1340–1374
- Born: c. 1320
- Died: c. 1374; Esrum Abbey
- Burial: Esrum Abbey
- Spouse: Valdemar IV of Denmark
- Issue among others...: Christopher, Duke of Lolland; Ingeborg, Duchess of Mecklenburg; Margaret I, Queen of Denmark
- House: Estridsen (Abelslægten line)
- Father: Eric II, Duke of Schleswig
- Mother: Adelaide of Holstein-Rendsburg

Helvig of Schleswig (also erroneously Hedwig; 1320–1374) was the queen of Denmark as the spouse of King Valdemar IV. She was the mother of Queen Margaret I of Denmark.

== Life ==
Helvig was the daughter of Eric II, Duke of Schleswig, and Adelaide of Holstein-Rendsburg, and the sister of Valdemar V, Duke of Schleswig. She was also a descendant of King Eric X of Sweden. Her date of birth is not known, but she and her brother were children at the time of her father's death in 1325, and she is estimated to have been born around the year 1320.

Her brother had contended for the Danish throne (as Valdemar III of Denmark) with King Christopher II of Denmark, and was the king of Denmark, from 1326 to 1329, under the guardianship of their maternal uncle, Gerhard III, Count of Holstein-Rendsburg. In the late 1330s, her brother made an alliance with King Christopher's son, Valdemar IV, against his uncle Gerhard, and arranged a marriage between Helvig and Valdemar IV in connection to this. She was to bring the pawned province of Nørrejylland, one quarter of the territory of Jutland north of the Kongeå river, as a dowry. The wedding took place at Sønderborg Castle in 1340. After the wedding, the couple traveled to Viborg to be officially greeted as king and queen of Denmark.

There is little information about queen Helvig. She is not mentioned to have been politically active or as having played any personal role in any aspect: she would, for example had been expected to serve as regent during Valdemar's pilgrimage in 1346, but there is no mention that she did. Until the birth of the future Margaret I of Denmark in 1353, she is noted as living with Valdemar, but after that year, she is no longer documented to be living with him.

A traditional theory was that king Valdemar had queen Helvig repudiated and imprisoned with her household at Søborg Castle for adultery. This theory was based on an old folk song, which described the love affair between the queen and a knight. This story is not confirmed. Another theory claims, that it was queen Helvig who separated from king Valdemar because of his adultery with his mistress Tove, and that she moved to Esrum Abbey in 1355. None of these theories have ever been confirmed, and the truth of their separation is unknown.

Helvig is confirmed to have lived separate from Valdemar at Esrum Abbey, where she eventually died as a lay sister, noted by the monks as famula nostra ('our servant'). She was buried in the abbey church, which brought royal gifts of property for the abbey. A year after her death, her spouse died and her daughter became regent of Denmark. In 1377, queen Margaret successfully asked the pope for permission to rebury her mother at Sorø, though this plan was never realized.

== Children ==
Helvig and Valdemar IV had at least six children;

1. Christopher, Duke of Lolland (1344–1363)
2. Margaret (1345–1350); betrothed to Henry III, Duke of Mecklenburg-Schwerin
3. Ingeborg (1347–1370); married Henry III, Duke of Mecklenburg-Schwerin, and was the maternal grandmother of King Eric VII of Denmark
4. Catherine (1349); died young
5. Valdemar (1350); died young
6. Margaret I of Denmark (1353–1412)

Helvig of Schleswig Abelslægten Cadet branch of the House of Estridsen
Danish royalty
Preceded by Euphemia of Pomerania (1320-1330) & Elizabeth of Holstein-Rendsburg (1330-1331)	Queen consort of Denmark; 1340–1374	Succeeded by Philippa of England
