= Christopher II of Denmark =

King of Denmark (1320–1326, 1329–1332)

Christopher II
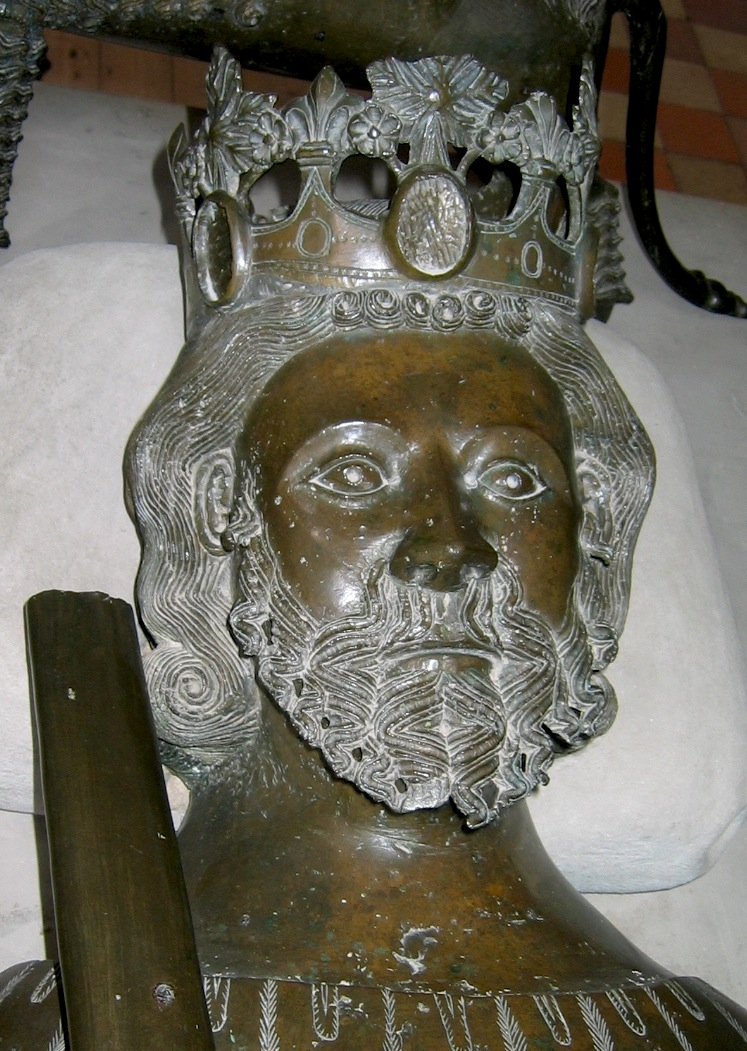
- Tomb effigy at Sorø Abbey

King of Denmark and the Wends
- Reign: 1320–1326
- Coronation: 15 August 1324; Vordingborg
- Predecessor: Eric VI Menved
- Successor: Valdemar III
- Junior king: Eric Christoffersen
- Reign: 1329–1332
- Predecessor: Valdemar III
- Successor: Vacant; Valdemar IV Atterdag
- Junior king: Eric Christoffersen
- Born: 29 September 1276
- Died: 2 August 1332 (aged 55); Nykøbing Castle
- Burial: Sorø Abbey
- Spouse: Euphemia of Pomerania (m. between 1300 and 1307)
- Issue among others...: Margaret, Margravine of Brandenburg; Eric Christoffersen; Otto, Duke of Lolland and Estonia; Valdemar IV Atterdag
Names
- Christopher Eriksen
- House: Estridsen
- Father: Eric V Klipping
- Mother: Agnes of Brandenburg

Christopher II (Danish: Christoffer 2.; 29 September 1276 – 2 August 1332) was King of Denmark from 1320 to 1326 and again from 1329 until his death. He was a younger son of Eric V. His name is connected with national disaster, as his rule ended in a near-total dissolution of the Danish state.

== Biography ==
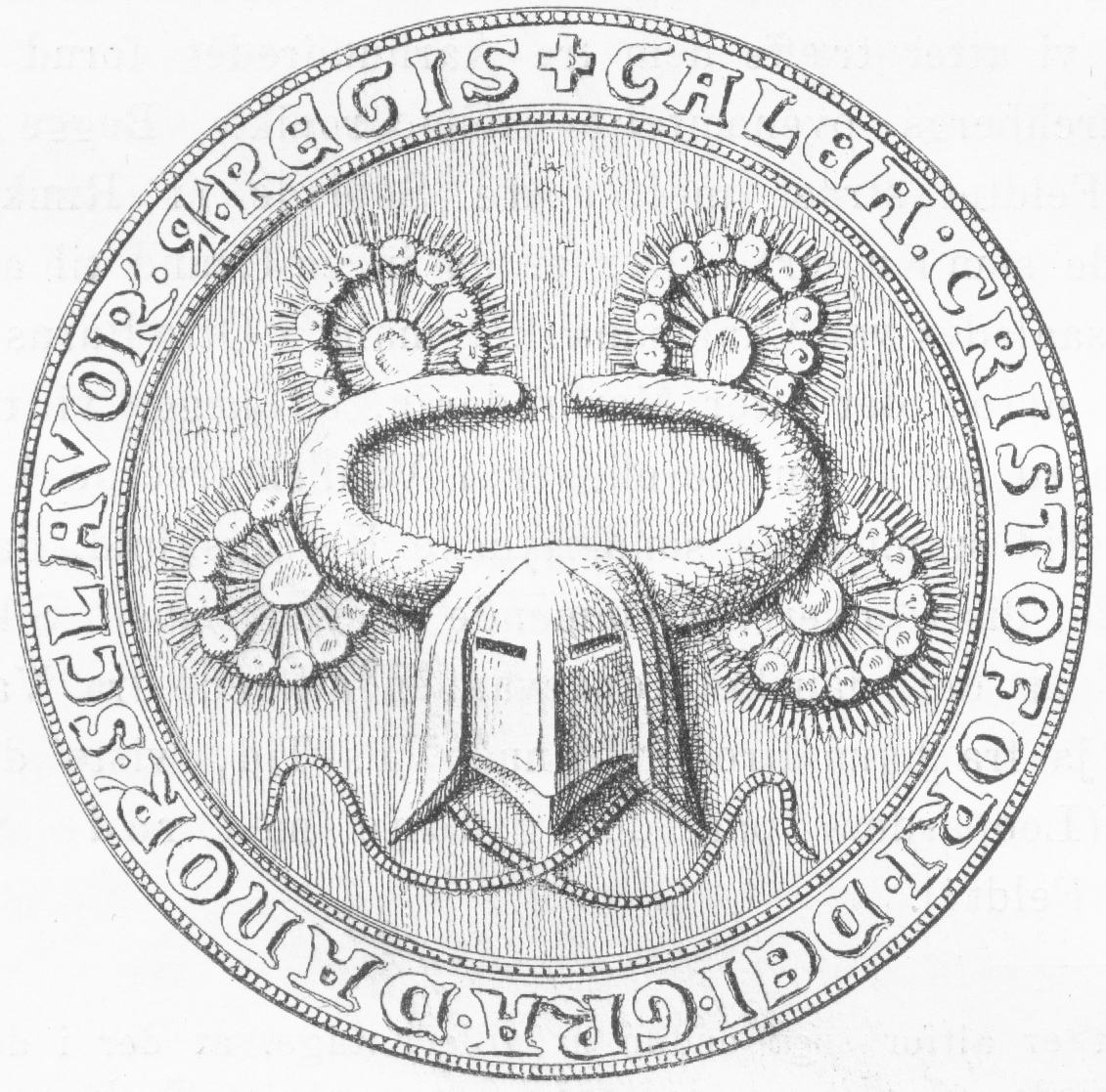
Seal of Christopher II

Being the brother of King Eric VI who reigned from 1286 until 1319, Christopher was a possible heir to the throne. As a young man with the title of Duke of Estonia, he supported the politics of his brother. Among other things he arrested Archbishop Jens Grand in 1294. But later on he joined the opposition and went into exile at the death of Eric in 1319.

The magnates wanted a weak royal power, and Christopher was elected as king in January 1320; in return he signed a contractual håndfæstning, the first time this kind of document was used as a coronation charter. He received a "bankrupt estate" in which entire regions of the kingdom were mortgaged to German and Danish magnates. The conditions of the charter were very hard, because they limited his ability to assess taxes, as well as demanded payments on the mortgages. Christopher could make no decision regarding the realm without the consent of the nobility and the bishops. The privileges of the nobility and the church were included in the charter and new ones were included. No bishop could be imprisoned, exiled, or fined without the pope's approval, no secular court could try any churchman, no church land or property could be taxed, the nobles could raise fees or rents on peasants, no noble could be forced to fight abroad or forced to pay to outfit soldiers to fight abroad, the king was required to ransom captured noblemen within a year, all taxes imposed since the reign of Valdemar Sejr on nobles or church were to be lifted, but the kingdom's debts were to be paid. This shift of power away from the king lasted until 1660.

Despite signing the charter, King Christopher ruled as if it did not exist. Since he could not tax the church or Danish nobles he levied disastrous taxes on the German territories and peasants. During the following years Christopher tried to strengthen his position by reviving Erik's policy of warfare against the duchies, counties, and cities of northern Germany. This resulted in new mortgages and taxes, and very soon he was in conflict with both the church and the magnates.

During a rebellion in 1326 he was overthrown by an alliance between Danish magnates and Gerhard III, Count of Holstein-Rendsburg and John I, Count of Holstein-Kiel, son of Adolf IV of Holstein). Christopher was forced into abdication and exile, while the 12-year-old Duke Valdemar of Southern Jutland was made king of Denmark, with Count Gerhard as regent. They forced Valdemar in his coronation charter to separate southern Jutland from Denmark so that never again would the King of Denmark rule there. Danish nobleman Knud Porse took Halland for himself for his services to Count Gerhard and Count Johann. The squabbling over who got which pieces of Denmark broke down the alliances which had forced Christopher out of the country.

Until 1329 Christopher lived in exile, but a growing chaos in the "magnates’ republic" of Denmark gave him another chance. Frictions developed between Gerhard and his cousin John the Mild, Count of Schauenburg and Holstein-Plön and Holstein-Kiel who was also Christopher's half-brother through his widowed mother's marriage to Gerhard II, Count of Holstein-Plön.

Suddenly, with the help of Henry of Mecklenburg, Christopher stood poised at Vordingborg with 2000 mounted German knights. Unfortunately for Christopher they allowed themselves to be surrounded and were forced to surrender. After a peasant uprising in Jutland which was crushed ruthlessly by Count Gerhard, the peasants in Skåne begged King Magnus IV of Sweden to rule them. He readily accepted and Denmark ceased to exist as a united kingdom.

Christopher was restored as Danish king in 1329–1330 with the cooperation of Count Johan, but this time he was reduced to the position of a puppet from the start. Most of his country was mortgaged, and he had no chance of holding real royal power. Jutland for example was mortgaged for 100,000 silver marks which had to be "laid on the table all at once" or the mortgage was not redeemed. It was an enormous mortgage and impossible to pay. Count Gerhard took all of Jutland as his personal property. Count Johan did the same on Funen and Zealand. In 1331 Christopher attempted to exploit a conflict between Counts Gerhard and Johan by joining the latter, but it ended in a clear military defeat at Dannevirke. Under the terms of the settlement between the counts, Christopher was allowed to retain the title of king, but in reality had no power whatsoever. He was given a simple house at Sakskøbing on Lolland, but even that was burned by German mercenaries. Christopher was imprisoned at Ålholm Castle on Lolland where he died a ruined and broken man the next year. He was buried at Sorø Abbey.

Upon his death Denmark ceased being a formal kingdom, and for the next eight years it was subdued by various mortgagees to German military rule.

== Legacy ==
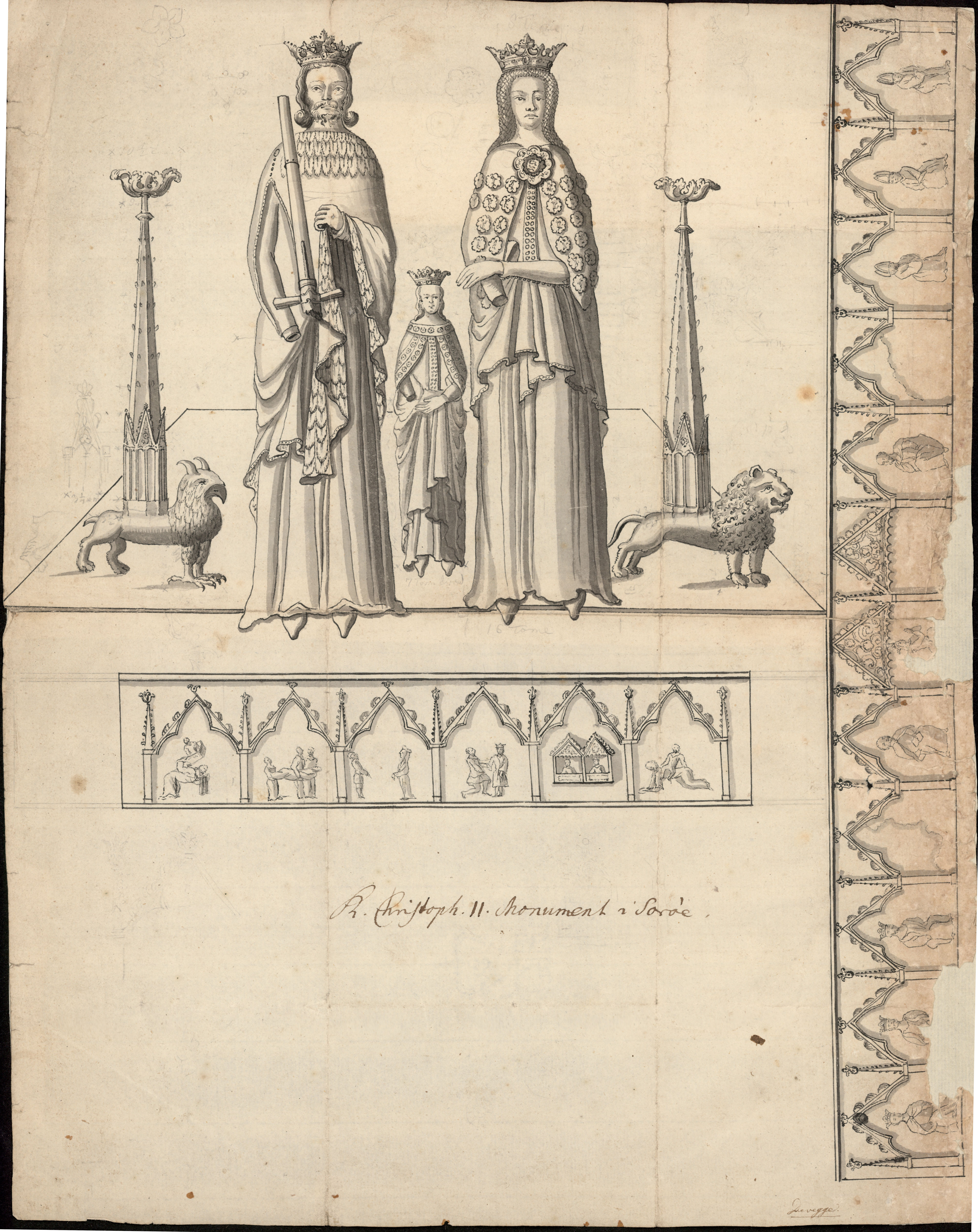
Drawing of his grave monument in Sorø Abbey Church.

History's judgment of Christopher has been extremely hard, and he has often been regarded as a weak, unreliable and incapable tyrant— "the king who mortgaged Denmark to the Germans". He in many ways simply carried on the policy of his predecessor. The policy of mortgaging parts of Denmark was common practice by nobles and kings alike to raise money. It would be incorrect to call him a passive ruler; the power of the Danish and German high nobility and their co-operation with church establishment undermined his freedom of action.

== Issue ==
With his wife, Euphemia of Pomerania, whom he wed before 1307:

- Margaret (c. 1305 – 1340); married Louis V, Duke of Bavaria
- Eric (1307–1331); married Elizabeth of Holstein-Rendsburg, sister of Count Gerhard III and widow of John II, Duke of Saxe-Lauenburg
- Otto, Duke of Lolland and Estonia (1310-aft. 1347)
- Agnes (d. 1312); died young
- Heilwig (born c. 1315)
- Valdemar (1320–1375)

Illegitimate with a lady, who according to legend was of the noble family Lunge:

- Regitze Christofferdatter Løvenbalk, married Peder Stigsen (Krognos) (-1352-1365-) of Krapperup. They can be seen in pedigrees and lexica, but Regitze was not a Løvenbalk.
- Erik Christoffersen Løvenbalk, had issue in Danish nobility.

Christopher II House of Estridsen Born: 29 September 1276 Died: 2 August 1332
Regnal titles
Preceded by Eric VI	King of Denmark; Duke of Estonia; 1320–1326 with Eric Christoffersen (1321-1326)	Succeeded by Valdemar III
Preceded by Valdemar III	King of Denmark; 1329–1332 with Eric Christoffersen (1329-1332)	Vacant Title next held by Valdemar IV
