= Sorø Abbey =

Monastic house in Denmark during the Middle Ages

Coordinates: 55.4301°N 11.5566°E

- Sorø Kloster
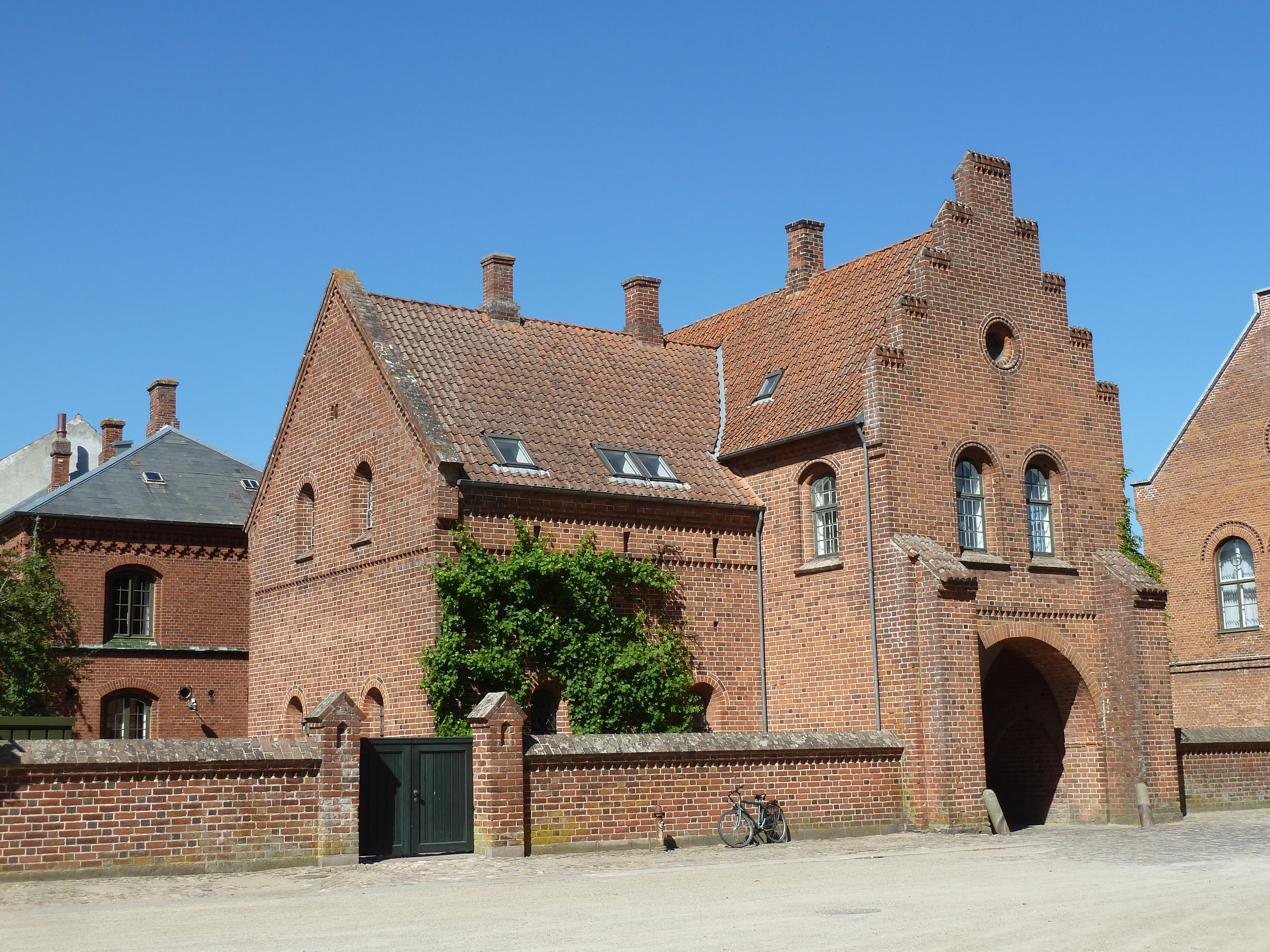
- The original gate to the abbey

Religion
- Affiliation: Order of Saint Benedict - 1161 Cistercians
- Ecclesiastical or organisational status: Episcopal polity
- Year consecrated: 1142

Location
- Location: Sorø
- Interactive map of Sorø Abbey

Architecture
- Style: Gothic architecture Romanesque architecture
- Groundbreaking: 1142
- Completed: 1201

Sorø Abbey was the preeminent and wealthiest monastic house in all of Denmark during the Middle Ages. It was located in the town of Sorø in central Zealand.

After Denmark became Lutheran in 1536, the abbey was confiscated by the Crown. The abbey was turned into the Sorø Academy in 1623, an educational institution that has served as a knight academy, a venue for higher learning during the Danish Golden Age. It survives to date as a boarding school.

== History ==
The Sorø Abbey was founded by the brothers Ebbe Skjalmsen Hvide and Asser Rig (Hvide), who were sons of Skjalm Hvide. They were Zealand's most powerful nobles when in 1140 they founded and in 1142 consecrated the abbey.

Near Sorø, Ebbe also erected the Bjernede Church, and Asser established a Benedictine House, just a few years prior to his death in 1151. Asser then lived as a monk for the last years of his life.

It was common practice for wealthy and powerful individuals and families to found religious houses, most typically for the following reasons: Expiation of a sinful life; to gain a stage to arrange commemorative and religious masses and events; to have a venue to provide services for the poor; or just out of religious zeal or devotion; or for any combination of the above.

Asser Rig's son, Absalon, became a powerful warrior bishop of Zealand and advisor to several Danish kings. In a move to reform Sorø, Bishop Absalon replaced the Benedictine monks with Cistercian monks from Esrum Abbey in 1161. The Cistercians went to work on building the abbey's church and monastery, using a new building material; large, red bricks. The technology and style for this had been imported from northern Germany.

One of Absalon's friends, Peder Strang, endowed the abbey with enough land to make it financially solvent. From that time forward, the Sorø abbey acquired property all over Denmark, with an income larger than that of the Danish royal family.

The abbey church became a burial site for the earthly remains of members of the noble Hvide family. The corpse of Absalon was buried behind the church's main altar. The corpses of three Danish kings were buried there; Christopher II, Valdemar IV Atterdag, and Oluf II. The corpse of Queen Margaret I was also buried there but was later moved to Roskilde Cathedral. Margaret's successor, Erik of Pomerania, was at Sorø Abbey during the first bombardment of Copenhagen in April 1428. Today, the church remains an excellent example of early Gothic brick architecture.

In 1247, much of the abbey burned down. The abbey remained in ruins for about ten years. A gift from the widow Ingeborg Strangessen allowed the rebuilding of the abbey, which now became to include arched vaults.

== Reformation in Denmark ==
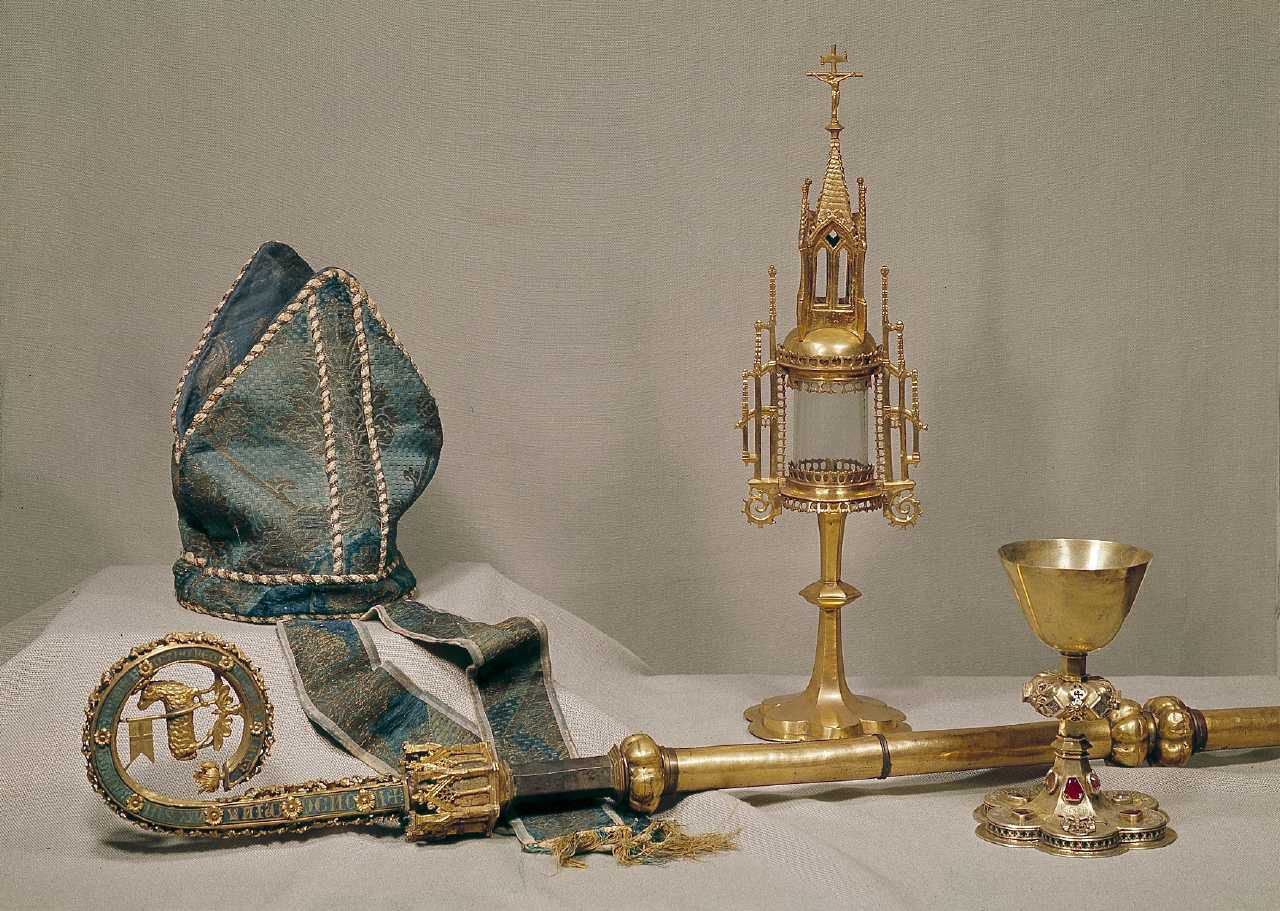
Artifacts associated with the abbey, now in the National Museum of Denmark

After Denmark officially became Lutheran in 1536, the abbey – a property of the Catholic Church – was confiscated by the Crown.

After a stint as an institution for Protestant monks, the abbey was transformed into the Sorø Academy, an educational institution that served a variety of forms, including a boarding school for noble and commoner boys during the era of Frederick II.

The abbey was then turned into a knight academy by Christian IV, and became a venue for higher learning for a period during the Danish Golden Age.

Since 1623, what became known as the Sorø Academy has existed as a boarding school and gymnasium on the former abbey complex.

== See also ==
- Abbey Gate (Sorø)
