= Valdemar IV of Denmark =

King of Denmark from 1340 to 1375

Valdemar IV
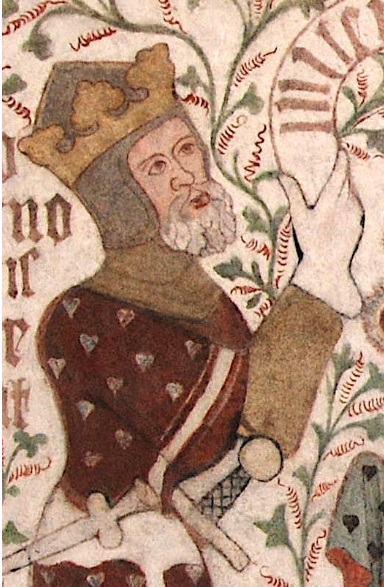
- Valdemar shown on a contemporary fresco in St. Peter's Church, Næstved (Sankt Peders Kirke).

King of Denmark and the Wends
- Reign: 24 June 1340 – 24 October 1375
- Predecessor: Christopher II
- Successor: Olaf II

King of the Goths
- Reign: 1361–1375
- Successor: Olaf II
- Born: 1320; Tikøb, Helsingør, Denmark
- Died: 24 October 1375 (aged 54–55); Gurre Castle, North Zealand, Denmark
- Burial: first at Vordingborg Castle, then Sorø Abbey
- Spouse: Helvig of Schleswig (m. 1340; died 1374)
- Issue among others...: Christopher, Duke of Lolland; Ingeborg, Duchess of Mecklenburg; Margaret I of Denmark
Names
- Valdemar Christoffersen
- House: Estridsen
- Father: Christopher II of Denmark
- Mother: Euphemia of Pomerania

Valdemar IV (c. 1320 – 24 October 1375), commonly known as Valdemar Atterdag (Note: The epithet Atterdag is traditionally interpreted as meaning "day again", referring to the restoration of Denmark after a period of political decline. It has also been suggested that the epithet derives from the Middle Low German phrase ter tage ("these days"), in the sense of "what times we live in!" In his biography of Valdemar, Fletcher Pratt interpreted it as "another day", suggesting that whatever happened on one day, good or bad, there would always be another. The epithet is sometimes rendered in English as "the Restorer".), also known as Valdemar Christoffersen or Waldemar, was King of Denmark from 1340 until his death in 1375. He is best known for restoring royal authority and reunifying Denmark after much of the kingdom had been pledged to Holstein nobles under previous rulers. Over the course of his 35-year reign, Valdemar gradually recovered most of the lost territories and re-established the Danish monarchy as an effective political power. His heavy taxation, assertive expansion of royal authority, and attempts to reclaim rights and lands held by the nobility provoked repeated opposition and uprisings during his reign.

== Accession ==
He was the youngest son of King Christopher II of Denmark and Euphemia of Pomerania. He spent most of his childhood and youth in exile at the court of Emperor Louis IV in Bavaria, after the defeats of his father and the death and imprisonment, respectively, of his two older brothers, Eric and Otto, at the hand of the Holsteiners. Here he acted as a pretender, waiting for a comeback.

Following the assassination of Gerhard III, Count of Holstein-Rendsburg, by Niels Ebbesen and his warriors, Valdemar was proclaimed king of Denmark at the Viborg Assembly (landsting) on St John's Day (St Hans' Day) on 24 June 1340, led by Ebbesen. Through his marriage with Helvig of Schleswig, the daughter of Eric II, Duke of Schleswig and what he inherited from his father, he controlled about one-quarter of the territory of Jutland north of the Kongeå river. He was not compelled to sign a charter as his father had done, probably because Denmark had been without a king for years, and no one expected the twenty-year-old king to be any more trouble to the great nobles than his father had been. But Valdemar was a clever and determined man and realized that the only way to rule Denmark was to get control of its territory. Ebbesen attempted to liberate central Jutland from the Holsteiners at the siege of Sønderborg Castle on 2 November 1340, but Ebbesen and his men were surrounded and killed by the Germans.

== Reunification of Denmark ==
Under his father, King Christopher II, Denmark went bankrupt and was mortgaged out in parcels. King Valdemar IV sought to repay the debt and reclaim the lands of Denmark. The first opportunity came with his wife Helvig's dowry. The mortgage on the rest of northern Jutland was paid off by taxes collected from King Valdemar's peasants above the Kongeå. In 1344, he recovered North Friesland, which he immediately taxed to pay off the debt on southern Jutland (7,000 silver marks). The over-taxed peasants grew restive under the constant demands for money.

Valdemar next set his sights on Zealand. The bishop of Roskilde, who owned Copenhagen Castle and town, gave both to Valdemar, providing a secure base from which to gather taxes on trade through the Sound (the Øresund). He was the first Danish king to rule from Copenhagen. Valdemar was able to capture or buy other castles and fortresses until he could force the Holsteiners out. When he ran out of money, he tried to take Kalundborg and Søborg Castles by force. While in the midst of that campaign, he went to Estonia to negotiate with the Teutonic Knights who controlled Estonia. Danes had never migrated there in any numbers, and so for 19,000 marks Valdemar gave up Danish Estonia, a far-off eastern province, which allowed him to pay off mortgages of parts of Denmark that were more important to him.

Around 1346 Valdemar IV initiated a crusade against Lithuania. Franciscan chronicler Detmar von Lübeck noted that Valdemar IV traveled to Lübeck in 1346, then turned to Prussia together with Eric II of Saxony in order to fight the Lithuanians. However, the crusade against the Lithuanians came to nothing, instead, Valdemar went on a pilgrimage to Jerusalem (without Papal permission). He succeeded and was made a Knight of the Holy Sepulchre in honor of his accomplishment. He was censured by Pope Clement VI for not getting prior approval for such a journey.

Upon his return, Valdemar gathered an army. In 1346, he took back Vordingborg Castle, the main headquarters of the Holsteiners. By the end of the year, Valdemar could claim all of Zealand as his own. He made Vordingborg his personal residence, expanded the castle, and built the Goose Tower which has become the symbol of the town. Valdemar's reputation for ruthlessness against those who opposed him made many think carefully about switching sides. His tax policy crushed the peasants who feared to do anything but pay up. By 1347 Valdemar had thrown out the Germans and once again Denmark was a nation.

With his increased income, Valdemar was able to pay for a larger army and by treachery came into possession of Nyborg Castle and eastern Funen Island and the smaller islands. Valdemar's attention had just turned to Scania, held by Sweden when disaster struck the entire region.

== Black Death ==
In 1349 the Black Death arrived. Tradition has it that bubonic plague came to Denmark on a ghost ship that beached itself on the coast of northern Jutland. Those who went aboard found the dead swollen and black-faced, but stayed long enough to take everything of value from it and thereby introduced the fleas that carried the disease into the population. People began to die by the thousands. During the next two years, plague swept through Denmark like a forest fire. In Ribe twelve parishes ceased to exist in a single diocese. A few towns simply died with no one left alive. The general figures for plague in 1349–50 ranged between 33% and 66% of the people of Denmark. City dwellers were often harder hit than farm folk leading many people to abandon towns altogether. Valdemar remained untouched and took advantage of the deaths of his enemies to add to his growing lands and properties. He refused to reduce the taxes the following year though fewer peasants farmed less land. Nobles, too, felt their incomes shrink and the tax burdens fell heavier on them as well. Uprisings flared up in the following years.

== Final pieces ==
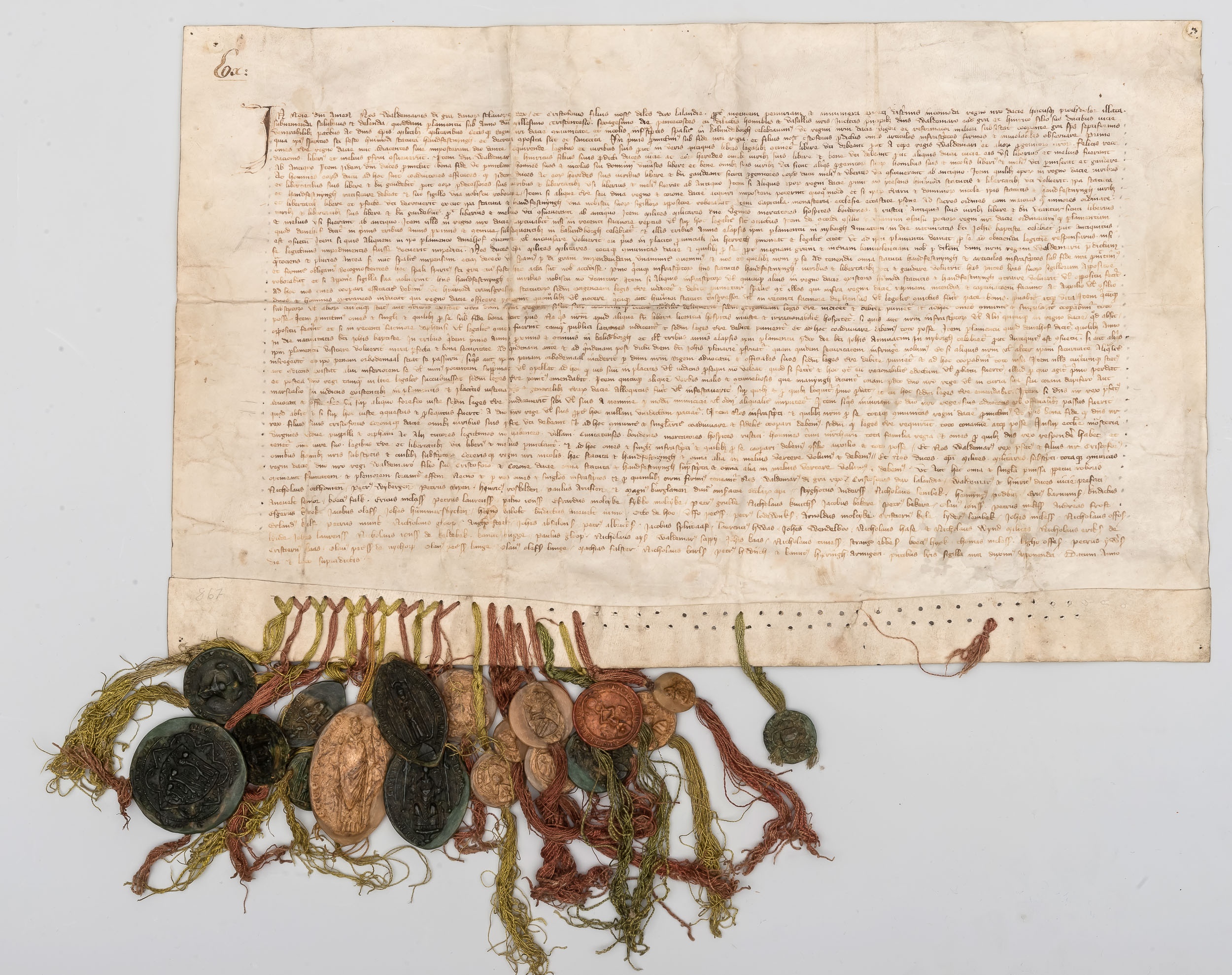
Valdemar IV's håndfæstning.

In 1350, Valdemar IV formed an alliance with Poland against the Teutonic Knights.

In 1354 the King and nobles met together as the Danish Court (Danehof) and worked out a peace settlement among the parties. The terms of the charter said that the Danehof was to meet at least once a year on St. John's Day, 24 June. The old system established in 1282 was reinstated and everyone's rights reverted to the traditional ones from before Christopher II's charter which gutted the powers of the king.

Valdemar responded by raising an army and marching through southern Jutland taking still more pieces of the lands that German counts had pried away from Denmark in the previous years. Rebellion spread quickly through Funen and he ravaged the Holsteiners' remaining territories and took the rest of the island. The charter proved to be useless when the king ignored the terms and the sporadic rebellions continued. That same year there was a monetary crisis which caused panic all over northern Europe.

There is a famous poem, written by Jens Peter Jacobsen and included in his work Gurresange, about Valdemar's mistress, Tove, who was killed on the orders of Queen Helvig, though that particular legend originally seems to be connected with his ancestor Valdemar I of Denmark. It was later set to music by Arnold Schoenberg from 1900 to 1903 (and 1910) as his Gurre-Lieder.

In 1358 Valdemar went back to Funen to try to reconcile with Jutland leader Niels Bugge (c. 1300 – c. 1358) and several other nobles and two bishops. The king refused to meet their terms, so they left the meeting in disgust. When they reached the town of Middelfart to find a ship to carry them over to Jutland, the fishermen they hired to transport them, murdered them. King Valdemar was blamed and the restive people of Jutland came out in open rebellion once again. They agreed to support each other in their fight to restore the rights the king once again had abrogated.

Valdemar turned once again to Scania which still lay under Swedish rule. In 1355, Prince Eric XII of Sweden rebelled against his father, King Magnus IV of Sweden, taking Scania and other parts of Sweden. King Magnus turned to Valdemar and entered into an agreement with him for help with Erik. Erik suddenly died in 1359. Valdemar crossed the Sound with an army and forced Magnus to give up Helsingborg in 1360. With the taking of Helsingborg, Valdemar for all intents regained Scania. Magnus wasn't strong enough to hold Scania, so it passed back to Danish control. Valdemar captured Halland, Blekinge, and Scania.

== Foreign policy after 1360 ==
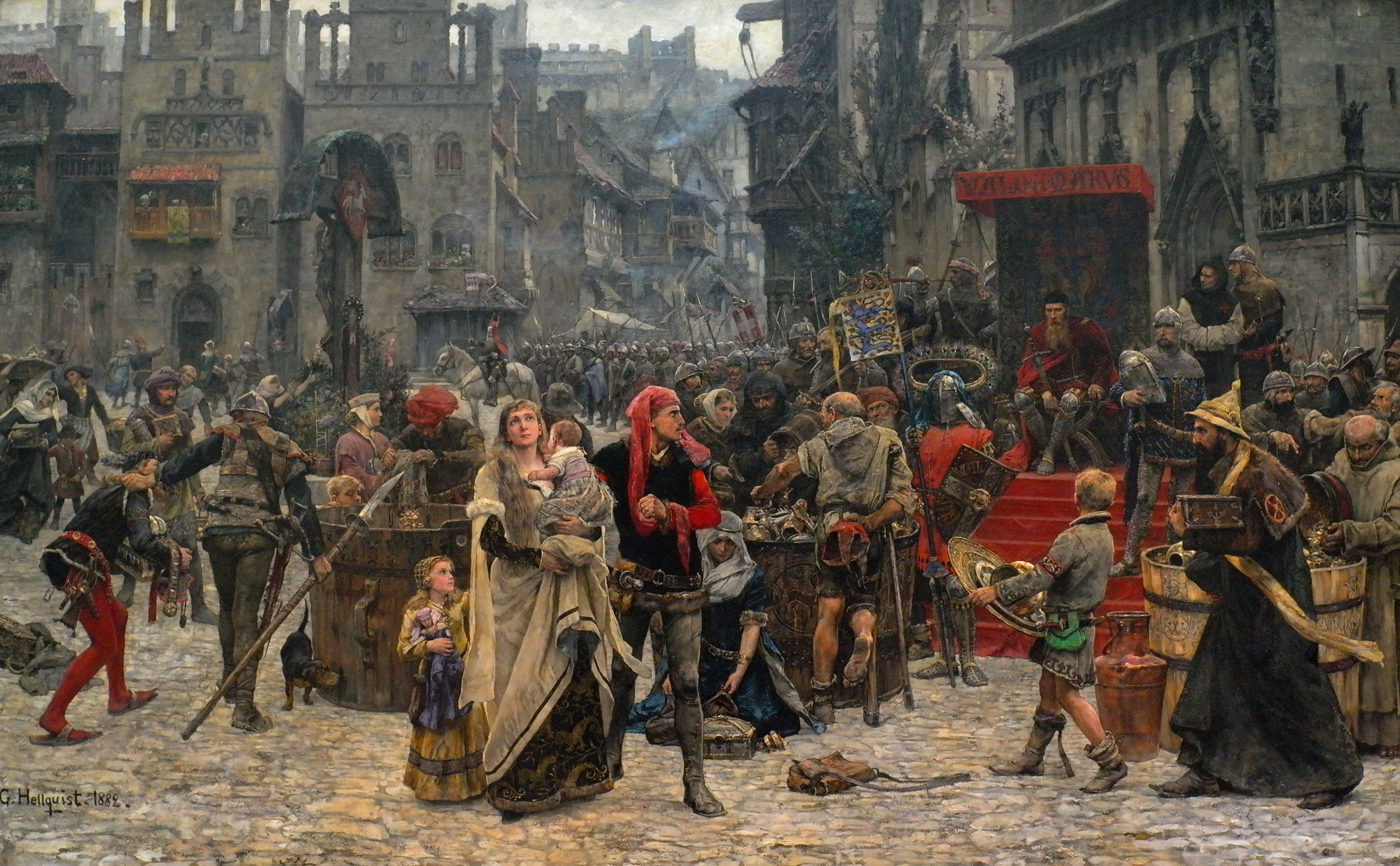
Valdemar Atterdag holding Visby to ransom, 1361, by Carl Gustaf Hellqvist (1851–1890).

Valdemar could do little about the increasing power of the Hanseatic League which had already become a major power in the region. Even before the conclusion of the small conflict with King Magnus, Valdemar decided to attack the Swedish island of Gotland, specifically the town of Visby. He raised an army, loaded them onto ships, and invaded Gotland in 1361. Valdemar fought the Gotlanders and defeated them in front of the city, killing 1800 men. The city surrendered, and Valdemar tore down part of the wall to make his entry. Once in possession, he set up three huge beer barrels and informed the city fathers that if the barrels weren't filled with silver and gold within three days, he would turn his men loose to pillage the town. To Valdemar's surprise, the barrels were filled before nightfall of the first day passed. The churches were stripped of their valuables and the riches were loaded on Danish ships and carried home to Vordingborg, Valdemar's residence. Valdemar added "King of Gotland" to his title list. But his action against Visby, a member of the Hanseatic League, would have dire consequences later.

Valdemar tried to interfere with the succession in Sweden by capturing Countess Elizabeth who was to marry Crown Prince Håkon of Sweden. She was forced into a nunnery and Valdemar convinced King Magnus that his son should marry Valdemar's daughter, Margrethe. The king agreed, but the nobles did not and forced Magnus to abdicate. They elected Albrecht of Mecklenburg, one of Valdemar's sworn enemies, as King of Sweden. Albrecht immediately went to work to stop Valdemar in his tracks. He persuaded the Hansa states to work with him because Valdemar threatened their access through the Sound and to the lucrative herring trade.

Valdemar attacked the Hansa fleet trying to force them out of the Sound fishing grounds. The Hansa member states demanded action. With Lübeck in the lead, they wrote to Valdemar complaining about his interference with trade.

In 1362 the Hansa states, Sweden, and Norway allied against Valdemar seeking retribution. The Hansa sent a fleet and an army to ravage the coasts of Denmark, and they succeeded in capturing and pillaging Copenhagen and parts of Scania. Combined with the rebellious nobles in Jutland, they forced Valdemar out of Denmark at Easter in 1368.

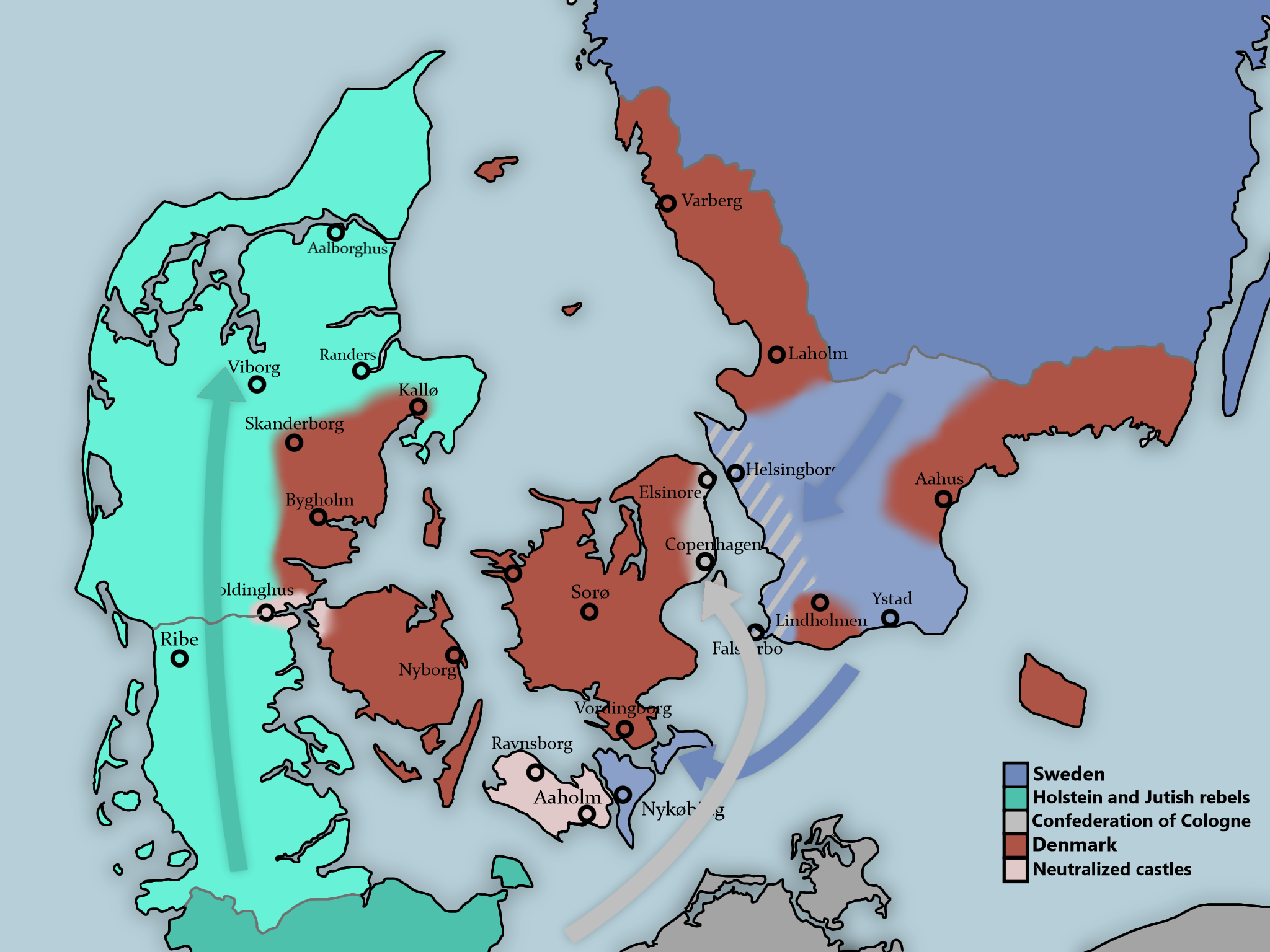
Military situation in Denmark (1370) after foreign invasions.

In 1363, Valdemar IV renewed his alliance with Poland.

He appointed his friend and advisor Henning Podebusk (c. 1350 – c. 1388) to negotiate with the Hanseatic League in his absence. They agreed to a truce so long as Valdemar acknowledged their right to free trade and fishing rights in the Sound. They took control of several towns on the coast of Scania and the fortress at Helsingborg for 15 years. They also forced the king to grant the Hanseatic League a say in Denmark's succession after Valdemar's death. Valdemar was forced to sign the Treaty of Stralsund in 1370, which acknowledged Hansa's rights to participate in the herring trade and tax exemptions for its trading fleet. The king was able to return to Denmark after an absence of four years. Valdemar received Gotland, however, so even in defeat he was able to salvage something for himself and Denmark.

== Death ==
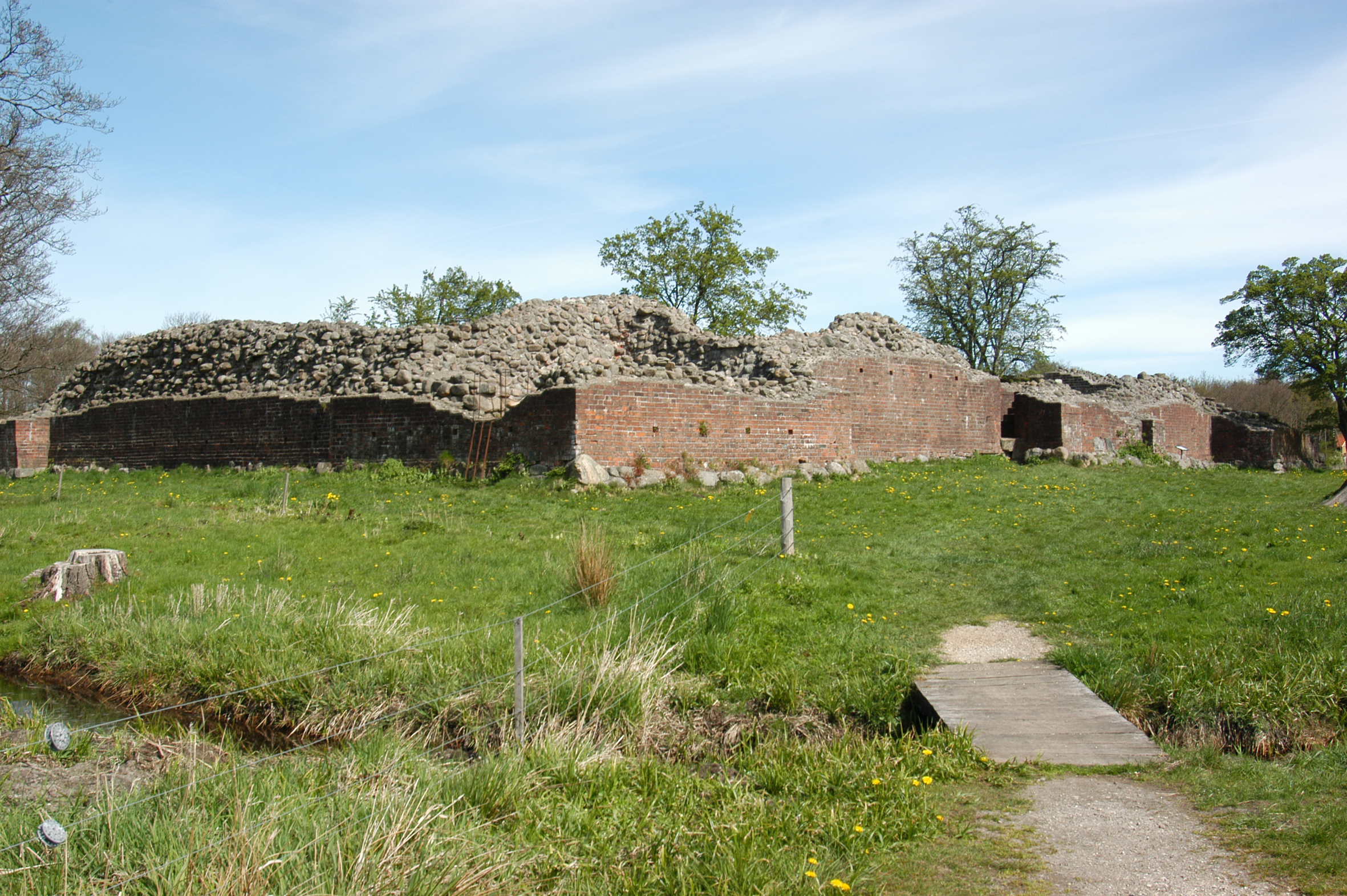
Ruins of Gurre Castle, 2007

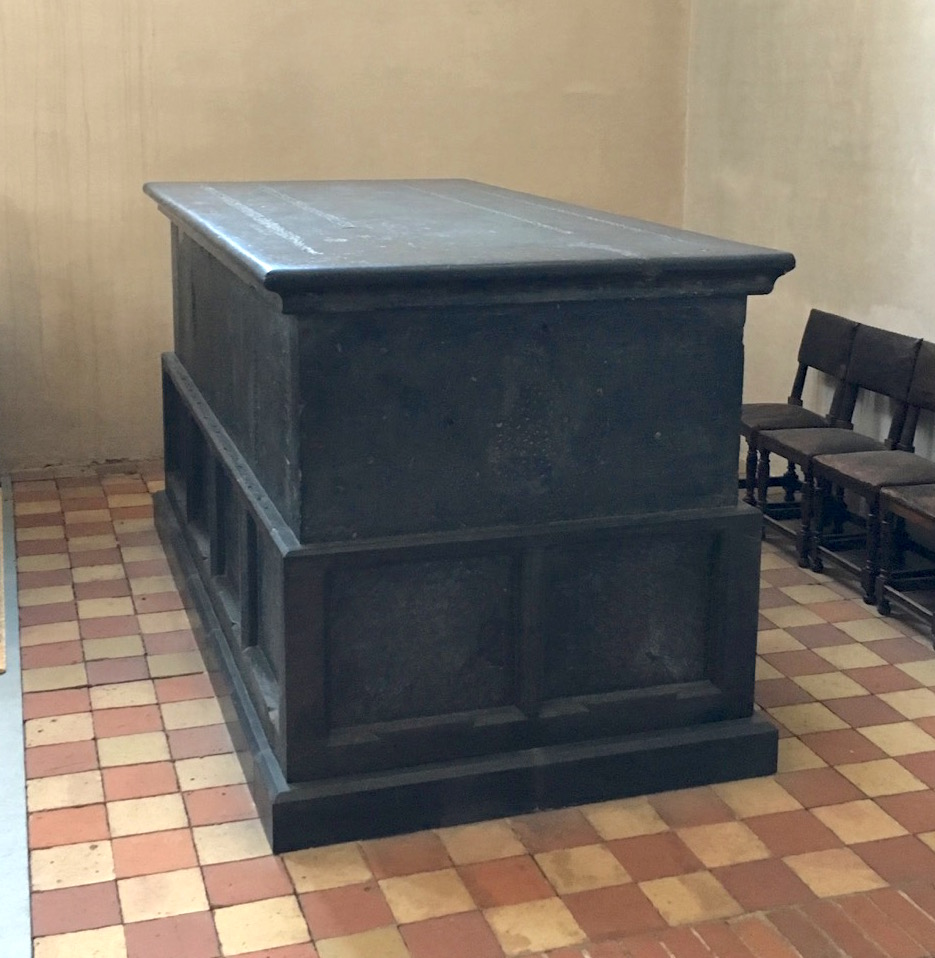
The tomb of Valdemar Atterdag in Sorø Abbey.

Even while dealing with the Hansa states, he was trying to suppress rebellious nobles who tried to assert the rights they had forced Valdemar's father to concede and fight the Swedes and Norwegians. He was in the process of taking gradual control of southern Jutland when he fell ill. Valdemar enlisted the help of Pope Gregory XI who agreed to excommunicate rebellious Danes. But before anything along those lines was done, Valdemar died at Gurre Castle in North Zealand on 24 October 1375 and was buried at Sorø Abbey. When Podebusk died, he was buried next to Valdemar at Sorø Abbey.

== Legacy ==
King Valdemar was a pivotal figure in Danish history; he gradually reacquired the lost territories that had been added to Denmark over the centuries. His heavy-handed methods, endless taxation, and usurpation of rights long held by noble families led to uprisings throughout Valdemar's reign. His attempt to recreate Denmark as a power in northern Europe was welcomed by the Danes in the beginning, but Valdemar's policies were met with bitter opposition by the great landed families of Jutland. He expanded the powers of the king based upon his military prowess and the loyal nobility that became the foundation of Danish rulers until 1440. Many foreigners were appointed as court officials and councilors. The most important of them was the German-Slavic nobleman Henning Podebusk who was drost (prime minister) from 1365 to 1388.

Valdemar IV is often regarded as one of the most important of all Danish medieval kings. The sources give the impression of an intelligent, cynical, reckless, and clever ruler with a talent for both policies and economy. His grandson Albert by his eldest daughter Ingeborg was offered unsuccessfully by his grandfather Albert II, Duke of Mecklenburg as Valdemar's successor. Instead, his grandson Olaf II, the offspring of his daughter Margaret and Haakon VI of Norway, son of Magnus Eriksson, was elected as his successor.

Many stories, ballads, and poems have been made about Valdemar. He was "reinvented' as one of the Danish hero kings during the mid-19th century when Denmark was fighting Germany for its traditional southern Jutland region.

== Issue ==
In the 1330s, Valdemar V, Duke of Schleswig (previous king of Denmark as Valdemar III) made an alliance with Valdemar IV against his uncle, Gerhard III, Count of Holstein-Rendsburg, and arranged a marriage between Valdemar IV and his sister, Helvig of Schleswig. She was to bring the pawned province of Nørrejylland, one-quarter of the territory of Jutland, as a dowry. The wedding took place at Sønderborg Castle in 1340. Helvig was the daughter of Eric II, Duke of Schleswig and Adelaide of Holstein-Rendsburg. After the wedding, the couple traveled to Viborg to be officially greeted as king and queen of Denmark. With his wife Helvig, Valdemar IV had the following children:

1. Christopher of Denmark, Duke of Lolland (1341–1363)
2. Margaret of Denmark (1345–1350), betrothed to Henry III, Duke of Mecklenburg, died young.
3. Ingeborg of Denmark (1347–1370), married Henry III, Duke of Mecklenburg, and was the maternal grandmother of King Eric VII of Denmark.
4. Catherine of Denmark (1349), died young.
5. Valdemar of Denmark (1350 – 11 June 1363), died young.
6. Margaret I of Denmark (1353–1412), married King Haakon VI of Norway, and was Queen of Denmark, Norway, and Sweden.

Evidence indicated also an illegitimate son, Erik Sjællandsfar, at Orebygård on Zealand, buried in Roskilde Cathedral with a crown. However, other evidence indicates that he was a son of King Eric VI of Denmark.

== Distinctions ==
- Knight of the Holy Sepulchre

== Other sources ==
- Fletcher Pratt (1950) The Third King, a biography of Valdemar Atterdag, Sloane. ISBN 978-1299313118
- Peter Lundbye (1939) Valdemar Atterdag: Danmarks Riges Genopretter, skildret i ny historisk Belysning efter de samtidige Kilders Beretning, Copenhagen: Ejnar Munksgaard.

Valdemar Atterdag Cadet branch of the House of Estridsen Born: c. 1320 Died: 25 October 1375
Regnal titles
Vacant Title last held by Christopher II	King of Denmark; 1340–1375	Succeeded by Olaf II
Preceded by Valdemar III of Denmark	Duke of Estonia; 1340–1346	Vacant Sold to the Livonian Order Title next held by Eric XIV of Sweden
