= List of consorts of Schleswig and Holstein =

The Duchesses of Schleswig-Holstein were the consorts of the rulers of Schleswig-Holstein and the separate states of Schleswig and Holstein, before that, the two duchies of Schleswig and Holstein. This article would focus more on the Duchess consorts of Schleswig and Holstein, Schleswig-Holstein (in pretense), and the many branches of the Schleswig-Holstein duchy created by the Danish king for his relatives.

The following list is a list the spouse of the jarls and dukes, who ruled over Schleswig respectively Southern Jutland (Sønderjylland).

== Countess consort of Schleswig (Southern Jutland) ==
Countess consort of Schleswig (Southern Jutland)
Picture	Name	Father	Birth	Marriage	Became Countess	Ceased to be Countess	Death	Spouse
	Ingegerd Haraldsdotter of Norway	Harald III of Norway (Hardrada)	c. 1046	?		18 August 1095 husband's death	c. 1120	Olaf I
	Ingeborg Mstislavna of Kiev	Mstislav I, Grand Prince of Kiev (Rurikids)	before 1105	c. 1117/1118		c. 1119 elevated to Duchess	?	Canute Lavard

== Duchess consort of Schleswig (Southern Jutland) ==
House of Estridsen (1119–1250) main line
Picture	Name	Father	Birth	Marriage	Became Duchess	Ceased to be Duchess	Death	Spouse
	Ingeborg Mstislavna of Kiev	Mstislav I, Grand Prince of Kiev (Rurikids)	before 1105	c. 1117/1118	c. 1119 elevated to Duchess	7 January 1131 husband's assassination	?	Canute Lavard
	Rikissa of Poland	Boleslaw III of Poland (Piast)	c. 12 April 1106/1116	c. 1127	c. 1130 husband's accession	4 June 1134 husband's death	after 1156	Magnus Nielsen
	Sofia of Minsk	Prince Volodar of Minsk (Rurikids)?	c. 1138/1141	?	23 October 1157 husband's accession	12 May 1182 husband's death	5 May 1198	Valdemar I
	Margarethe of Bohemia	Ottokar I of Bohemia (Přemysl)	c. 1186	c. 1205		24 May 1212/1213		Valdemar II
	Berengária of Portugal	Sancho I of Portugal (Burgundy)	c. 1191/14 December 1194	c. 1214		27 March/1 Abril 1221		Valdemar II
	Eleanor of Portugal	Afonso II of Portugal (Burgundy)	c. 1211	24 June 1229 co-duchess consort alongside Berengária, her stepmother-in-law/aunt		28 November 1231 husband's death	13 May 1231	Valdemar the Young

House of Estridsen (1250–1326) Abelslægten line
Picture	Name	Father	Birth	Marriage	Became Duchess	Ceased to be Duchess	Death	Spouse
	Mechtild of Holstein	Adolf IV, Count of Schauenburg and Holstein (Schauenburg)	c. 1220 or 1225	25 April 1237	1 November 1250 husband's accession	29 June 1252 husband's death	c. 1288	Abel
	Margareta of Rügen	Jaromar II, Prince of Rügen (Rügen)	?	c. 1259/1260		27 March 1272 husband's death	c. 1272	Eric I
	Elisabeth of Saxe-Lauenburg	John I, Duke of Saxony (Ascania)	?	c. 1287		?	?	Valdemar IV
	Adelheid of Holstein-Rendsburg	Henry I, Count of Holstein-Rendsburg (Schauenburg)	?	c. 1313		12 March 1325 husband's death	January 1350	Eric II

House of Schauenburg (1326–1330)
Picture	Name	Father	Birth	Marriage	Became Duchess	Ceased to be Duchess	Death	Spouse
	Sofia of Mecklenburg-Werle	Nikolaus II of Mecklenburg-Werle-Güstrow (Mecklenburg-Werle)	?	c. 1315	c. 1326 husband's became duke	c. 1330 husband's cease to be duke	6 December 1339	Gerhard I

House of Estridsen (1330–1375) Abelslægten line
Picture	Name	Father	Birth	Marriage	Became Duchess	Ceased to be Duchess	Death	Spouse
	Richardis of Schwerin	Günzelin VI, Count of Schwerin-Wittenburg (Hagen)	–	–		1364 husband's death	before 1386	Valdemar V
	Kunigunde ?	?	?	c. 1370 ?		August 1375 husband's death	c. 1386	Henry I

== Duchess consort of Schleswig and Holstein ==
House of Schauenburg (1375–1459)
Picture	Name	Father	Birth	Marriage	Became Duchess	Ceased to be Duchess	Death	Spouse
	Ingeborg of Mecklenburg	Albert II, Duke of Mecklenburg (Mecklenburg)	c. 1340	c. 1366/1374		c. 1364 husband's death	25 July 1395	Henry II
	Catherine Elisabeth of Brunswick-Lüneburg	Magnus II, Duke of Brunswick-Lüneburg (Brunswick-Lüneburg)	c. 1368	c. 1391		4 August 1404 husband's death	c. 1420	Gerhard II
	Margarete von Hohnstein	?	?	?	?	?	?	Adolf

House of Oldenburg (1460–1863), Queen consort of Denmark and Duchess consort of Schleswig and Holstein
Picture	Name	Father	Birth	Marriage	Became Duchess	Ceased to be Duchess	Death	Spouse
	Dorothea of Brandenburg	John, Margrave of Brandenburg-Kulmbach (Hohenzollern)	1430/31	28 October 1449	5 March 1460 husband's ascession	21 May 1481 husband's death	10 November 1495	Christian I
	Christina of Saxony	Ernest, Elector of Saxony (Wettin)	25 December 1461	6 September 1478	21 May 1481 husband's ascession	20 February 1513 husband' death	8 December 1521	John
	Isabella of Austria	Philip I of Castile (Habsburg)	18 July 1501	12 August 1515		20 January 1523 husband's desposition	19 January 1526	Christian II
	Anna of Brandenburg	John Cicero, Elector of Brandenburg (Hohenzollern)	27 August 1487	10 April 1502 as co-duchess		3 May 1514		Frederick I
	Sophie of Pomerania	Bogislaw X, Duke of Pomerania (Pomerania)	1498	9 October 1518 as co-duchess		10 April 1533 husband's death	13 May 1568	Frederick I
	Dorothea of Saxe-Lauenburg	Magnus I, Duke of Saxe-Lauenburg (Ascania)	9 July 1511	29 October 1525		1 January 1559 husband's death	7 October 1571	Christian III
	Sophie of Mecklenburg-Güstrow	Ulrich III, Duke of Mecklenburg-Güstrow (Mecklenburg-Güstrow)	4 September 1557	20 July 1572		4 April 1588 husband's death	14 October 1631	Frederick II
	Anne Catherine of Brandenburg	Joachim III Frederick, Elector of Brandenburg (Hohenzollern)	26 June 1575	27 November 1597		8 April 1612		Christian IV
	Sophie Amalie of Brunswick-Lüneburg	George, Duke of Brunswick-Lüneburg (Welf)	24 March 1628	1 October 1643	28 February 1648 husband's ascession	9 February 1670 husband's death	20 February 1685	Frederick III
	Charlotte Amalie of Hesse-Kassel	William VI, Landgrave of Hesse-Kassel (Hesse-Kassel)	27 April 1650	25 June 1667	9 February 1670 husband's accession	25 August 1699 husband's death	27 March 1714	Christian V
	Louise of Mecklenburg-Güstrow	Gustav Adolf, Duke of Mecklenburg-Güstrow (Mecklenburg-Güstrow)	28 August 1667	5 December 1695	25 August 1699 husband's ascession	15 March 1721		Frederick IV
	Anne Sophie Reventlow	Conrad, Count Reventlow (Reventlow)	16 April 1693	4 April 1721		12 October 1730 husband's death	7 January 1743	Frederick IV
	Sophia Magdalene of Brandenburg-Kulmbach	Christian Heinrich, Margrave of Brandenburg-Bayreuth-Kulmbach (Hohenzollern)	28 November 1700	7 August 1721	12 October 1730 husband's ascession	6 August 1746 husband's death	27 May 1770	Christian VI
	Louise of Great Britain	George II of Great Britain (Hanover)	7 December 1724	11 December 1743	6 August 1746 husband's ascession	19 December 1751		Frederick V
	Juliana Maria of Brunswick-Wolfenbüttel	Ferdinand Albert II, Duke of Brunswick-Wolfenbüttel (Brunswick-Bevern)	4 September 1729	8 July 1752		13 January 1766 husband's death	10 October 1796	Frederick V
	Caroline Matilda of Great Britain	Frederick, Prince of Wales (Hanover)	11 July 1751	8 November 1766		10 May 1775		Christian VII
	Marie Sophie of Hesse-Kassel	Landgrave Charles of Hesse-Kassel (Hesse-Kassel)	28 October 1767	31 July 1790	13 March 1808 husband's ascession	3 December 1839 husband's death	21 March/22 March 1852	Frederick VI
	Caroline Amalie of Schleswig-Holstein-Sonderburg-Augustenburg	Frederick Christian II, Duke of Schleswig-Holstein-Sonderburg-Augustenburg (Schleswig-Holstein-Sonderburg-Augustenburg)	28 June 1796	22 May 1815	3 December 1839 husband's ascession	20 January 1848 husband's death	9 March 1881	Christian VIII

== See also ==
- List of dukes of Schleswig
- List of rulers of Schleswig-Holstein
- List of Danish consorts
- List of consorts of Oldenburg
- List of consorts of Holstein-Sonderburg
- List of Norwegian queens
- List of Finnish consorts
- List of Swedish consorts
