= List of Danish royal consorts =

Spouses of Danish monarchs

This list of Danish consorts includes each queen consort (wife of a reigning king) and each prince consort (husband of a reigning queen). Due to unions (personal and real), the queens of 1380–1814 (effectively from 1406) were also queens of Norway, and the queens of 1389–1521/23 (effectively from 1406) were also (though with interruptions) queens of Sweden. The Australian-born Mary, wife of King Frederik X, became queen consort on 14 January 2024, following the abdication of Margrethe II.

== House of Knýtlinga ==
Picture	Name	Father	Birth	Marriage	Became Consort	Ceased to be Consort	Death	Spouse
	Thyra Danebod	Thyra may have been the daughter of one of the regional Danish chiefs, probably from southern Jutland and some sagas claims that Thyra was a daughter of a duke named Klak-Harald. According to the Gesta Danorum Thyra was the daughter of Aethelred, King of England. Presumably Ethelred of Wessex is intended: if Ethelred the Unready, then this is anachronistic.			9?? (prior to 943) husband's accession	(950)-(958) ?		Gorm
	Tove of the Obotrites	Mstivoj	–	January 963		?		Harald I
	Gyrid Olafsdottir of Sweden [legendary]	Olof (II) Björnsson (Munsö)	–	98?		985/6 husband's death	–	Harald I
	Gunhild of Wenden [legendary]	Burislav of Wendland	perhaps identical to Sigrid and or the daughter of Mieszko I.					Sweyn I
	Sigrid Storråda [legendary]	Skagul Toste	Den Store Danske Encyklopædi identifies the consort of Sweyn I as Gunhild, and considers the Sigrid the Haughty of the sagas to be based on her, but predominantly a work of "complete fiction". Source: Den Store Danske Encyklopædi, CD-ROM edition, entries Gunhild and Sigrid Storråde.					Sweyn I
	(name unknown; reconstructed as Świętosława)	Mieszko I of Poland (Piast)	perhaps identical to one or both of previous					Sweyn I
	Emma of Normandy	Richard I, Duke of Normandy (Normandy)	985	July 1017		12 November 1035 husband's death	6 March 1052	Canute II

== House of Estridsen ==
Picture	Name	Father	Birth	Marriage	Became Consort	Ceased to be Consort	Death	Spouse
	Gyda Anundsdotter of Sweden	Anund Jacob of Sweden (Munsö)	–	1047/48		1048/49		Sweyn II
	Gunnhildr Sveinsdóttir	Sveinn Hákonarson	–	1050		1051/52 marriage annulled	1060	Sweyn II
	Margareta Hasbjörnsdatter	jarl Asbjörn Ulfsen	–	1076		17 April 1080 husband's death	–	Harald III
	Adela of Flanders	Robert I, Count of Flanders (Flanders)	1064	17 April 1080		10 July 1086 husband's murder	April 1115	Canute IV
	Ingegerd Haraldsdotter of Norway	Harald III of Norway (Hardrada)	1046	1070	10 July 1086 husband's accession	18 August 1095 husband's death	1120	Olaf I
	Boedil Thurgotsdatter	Earl Thrugot Fagerskind	1056	before 1086	18 August 1095 husband's accession	10 July 1103 husband's death	late 1103	Eric I
	Margaret Fredkulla Ingesdotter of Sweden	Inge I of Sweden (Stenkil)	1080s	1105		4 November 1130		Niels
	Ulvhild Håkansdotter	Haakon Finnsson (Thjotta)	1095	1130		25 June 1134 husband's murder	1148	Niels
	Malmfred Mstislavna of Kiev	Mstislav I, Grand Prince of Kiev (Rurikids)	1105	1131	4 June 1134 husband's accession	18 July 1137 husband's murder	after 1137	Eric II
	Lutgard of Salzwedel	Rudolf, Margrave of Salzwedels (Udonen)	1110	1144		8 August 1146 husband's abdication	29/30 January 1152	Eric III
	Adela of Meissen	Conrad, Margrave of Meissen (Wettin)	–	1152		23 October 1157 husband's murder	23 October 1181	Sweyn III
	Helena Sverkersdotter of Sweden	Sverker I of Sweden (Sverker)	1130s	1156		9 August 1157 husband's murder	after 1157	Canute V
	Sophia of Minsk	Prince Volodar of Minsk (Rurikids)	1138/41	1157		12 May 1182 husband's death	5 May 1198	Valdemar I
	Gertrude of Bavaria	Henry the Lion (Welf)	1152/55	February 1177	12 May 1182 husband's accession	1 June 1197		Canute VI
Non-contemporary	Dagmar of Bohemia	Ottokar I of Bohemia (Přemysl)	1186	1205		24 May 1212/13		Valdemar II
	Berengaria of Portugal	Sancho I of Portugal (Burgundy)	1191/14 December 1194	18/24 May 1214		27 March/1 April 1221		Valdemar II
Non-contemporary	Eleanor of Portugal	Afonso II of Portugal (Burgundy)	1211	24 June 1229 as junior-queen consort		13 May 1231		Valdemar the Young
	Jutta of Saxony	Albert I, Duke of Saxony (Ascania)	1223	17 November 1239	17 November 1239 as junior-queen consort 28 March 1241 husband's accession as sole king	10 August 1250 husband's death	before 2 February 1267	Eric IV
	Mechtild of Holstein	Adolf IV, Count of Holstein (Schaumburg)	1220/25	25 April 1237	1 November 1250 husband's accession	29 June 1252 husband's death	1288	Abel
	Margaret Sambirsdatter	Sambor II, Duke of Pomerania (Sobiesław)	1230	1248	25 December 1252 husband's accession	29 May 1259 husband's death	1 December 1282	Christopher I
	Agnes of Brandenburg	John I, Margrave of Brandenburg (Ascania)	1257	11 November 1273		22 November 1286 husband's murder	29 September 1304	Eric V
	Ingeborg Magnusdotter of Sweden	Magnus Ladulås (Bjälbo)	1277	June 1296		5 April/15 August 1319		Eric VI
	Euphemia of Pomerania	Bogislaw IV, Duke of Pomerania (Pomerania)	1285	1300	25 January 1320 husband's accession	26 July 1330		Christopher II
	Elizabeth of Holstein-Rendsburg	Henry I, Count of Holstein-Rendsburg (Schauenburg)	1300	1330 as junior-queen consort		1331 divorce	before 1340	Eric Christoffersen of Denmark
Interregnum (1332–1340)
	Helvig of Schleswig	Eric II, Duke of Schleswig (Abelslægten)	–	before 4 June 1340		1355 enter convent 1374 death		Valdemar IV

== House of Griffin ==
Picture	Name	Father	Birth	Marriage	Became Consort	Ceased to be Consort	Death	Spouse
Non-contemporary	Philippa of England	Henry IV of England (Lancaster)	4 June 1394	26 October 1406		5 January 1430		Eric VII

== House of Palatinate-Neumarkt ==
Picture	Name	Father	Birth	Marriage	Became Consort	Ceased to be Consort	Death	Spouse
	Dorothea of Brandenburg	John, Margrave of Brandenburg-Kulmbach (Hohenzollern)	1430/31	12 September 1445		6 January 1448 husband's death	10 November 1495	Christopher III

== House of Oldenburg ==
Picture	Name	Father	Birth	Marriage	Became Consort	Ceased to be Consort	Death	Spouse
	Dorothea of Brandenburg	John, Margrave of Brandenburg-Kulmbach (Hohenzollern)	1430/31	28 October 1449		21 May 1481 husband's death	10 November 1495	Christian I
	Christina of Saxony	Ernest, Elector of Saxony (Wettin)	25 December 1461	6 September 1478	21 May 1481 husband's ascession	20 February 1513 husband' death	8 December 1521	John
	Isabella of Austria	Philip I of Castile (Habsburg)	18 July 1501	12 August 1515		13 April 1523 royal couple leaving Denmark	19 January 1526	Christian II
	Sophie of Pomerania	Bogislaw X, Duke of Pomerania-Wolgast (Pomerania)	1498	9 October 1518	13 April 1523 husband's ascession	10 April 1533 husband's death	13 May 1568	Frederick I
Interregnum (1533–1534)
	Dorothea of Saxe-Lauenburg	Magnus I, Duke of Saxe-Lauenburg (Ascania)	9 July 1511	29 October 1525	4 July 1534 husband's ascession	1 January 1559 husband's death	7 October 1571	Christian III
	Sophie of Mecklenburg-Güstrow	Ulrich III, Duke of Mecklenburg-Güstrow (Mecklenburg-Güstrow)	4 September 1557	20 July 1572		4 April 1588 husband's death	14 October 1631	Frederick II
	Anne Catherine of Brandenburg	Joachim III Frederick, Elector of Brandenburg (Hohenzollern)	26 June 1575	27 November 1597		8 April 1612		Christian IV
	Sophie Amalie of Brunswick-Lüneburg	George, Duke of Brunswick-Lüneburg (Brunswick-Lüneburg)	24 March 1628	1 October 1643	28 February 1648 husband's ascession	9 February 1670 husband's death	20 February 1685	Frederick III
	Charlotte Amalie of Hesse-Kassel	William VI, Landgrave of Hesse-Kassel (Hesse-Kassel)	27 April 1650	25 June 1667	9 February 1670 husband's ascession	25 August 1699 husband's death	27 March 1714	Christian V
	Louise of Mecklenburg-Güstrow	Gustav Adolph, Duke of Mecklenburg-Güstrow (Mecklenburg-Güstrow)	28 August 1667	5 December 1695	25 August 1699 husband's ascession	15 March 1721		Frederick IV
	Anne Sophie Reventlow	Conrad, Count Reventlow (Reventlow)	16 April 1693	4 April 1721		12 October 1730 husband's death	7 January 1743	Frederick IV
	Sophia Magdalene of Brandenburg-Kulmbach	Christian Heinrich, Margrave of Brandenburg-Bayreuth-Kulmbach (Hohenzollern)	28 November 1700	7 August 1721	12 October 1730 husband's ascession	6 August 1746 husband's death	27 May 1770	Christian VI
	Louise of Great Britain	George II of Great Britain (Hanover)	7 December 1724	11 December 1743	6 August 1746 husband's ascession	19 December 1751		Frederick V
	Juliana Maria of Brunswick-Wolfenbüttel	Ferdinand Albert II, Duke of Brunswick-Wolfenbüttel (Brunswick-Bevern)	4 September 1729	8 July 1752		13 January 1766 husband's death	10 October 1796	Frederick V
	Caroline Matilda of Great Britain	Frederick, Prince of Wales (Hanover)	11 July 1751	8 November 1766		April 1772 divorce	10 May 1775	Christian VII
	Marie Sophie of Hesse-Kassel	Landgrave Charles of Hesse-Kassel (Hesse-Kassel)	28 October 1767	31 July 1790	13 March 1808 husband's ascession	3 December 1839 husband's death	21 March/22 March 1852	Frederick VI
	Caroline Amalie of Schleswig-Holstein-Sonderburg-Augustenburg	Frederick Christian II, Duke of Schleswig-Holstein-Sonderburg-Augustenburg (Schleswig-Holstein-Sonderburg-Augustenburg)	28 June 1796	22 May 1815	3 December 1839 husband's ascession	20 January 1848 husband's death	9 March 1881	Christian VIII

== House of Schleswig-Holstein-Sonderburg-Glücksburg ==
Picture	Coat of arms	Name	Father	Birth	Marriage	Became Consort	Ceased to be Consort	Death	Spouse
		Louise of Hesse-Kassel	Landgrave William of Hesse-Kassel (Hesse)	7 September 1817	26 May 1842	15 November 1863 husband's accession	29 September 1898		Christian IX
		Louise of Sweden and Norway	Charles XV of Sweden (Bernadotte)	31 October 1851	28 July 1869	29 January 1906 husband's accession	14 May 1912 husband's death	20 March 1926	Frederik VIII
		Alexandrine of Mecklenburg-Schwerin	Frederick Francis III, Grand Duke of Mecklenburg-Schwerin (Mecklenburg)	24 December 1879	26 April 1898	14 May 1912 husband's accession	20 April 1947 husband's death	28 December 1952	Christian X
		Ingrid of Sweden	Gustaf VI Adolf of Sweden (Bernadotte)	28 March 1910	24 May 1935	20 April 1947 husband's accession	14 January 1972 husband's death	7 November 2000	Frederik IX
		Henri de Laborde de Monpezat	André, Count de Laborde de Monpezat (Monpezat)	11 June 1934	10 June 1967	14 January 1972 wife's accession	13 February 2018		Margrethe II
		Mary Donaldson	John Dalgleish Donaldson	5 February 1972	14 May 2004	14 January 2024 husband's accession	Incumbent	Living; Age: 54 years, 225 days	Frederik X

== See also ==
- List of Danish monarchs
- List of consorts of Schleswig and Holstein
- List of consorts of Oldenburg
- List of Norwegian consorts
- List of Finnish consorts
- List of Swedish consorts
