= Valdemar of Denmark =

Valdemar of Denmark is the name of:

- Valdemar I of Denmark (1131–1182), King of Denmark from 1157 to 1182
- Valdemar of Denmark (bishop) (1158–1236), illegitimate son of Canute V
- Valdemar II of Denmark (1170–1241), King of Denmark from 1202 to 1241
- Valdemar the Young (1209–1231), co-king along with father Valdemar II
- Valdemar III, Duke of Schleswig (died 1257), son of Abel
- Valdemar IV, Duke of Schleswig (c.1262-1312), grandson of Abel and grandfather of King Valdemar III
- Valdemar III of Denmark (1314–1364), king of Denmark from 1326 to 1329
- Valdemar IV of Denmark (1320–1375), King of Denmark from 1340 to 1375
- Prince Valdemar of Denmark (1858–1939), youngest son of Christian IX
