= Duke of Schleswig =

Wikimedia article list

The following is a list of jarls and dukes, who ruled over Schleswig respectively Southern Jutland (Sønderjylland).

== First jarls/dukes ==
=== House of Estridsen (1080–1375) ===
| Ruler | Born | Reign | Ruling part | Consort | Death | Notes |
|---|---|---|---|---|---|---|
| Olaf I Hunger | c.1050 Son of Sweyn II of Denmark | 1080 – 18 August 1095 | Duchy of Schleswig | Ingegerd of Norway c.1070 one child | 18 August 1095 aged 44-45 | Jarl (earl) of Jutland, since 1086 king of Denmark. |
Direct rule by Denmark (1095-1115)
| Canute I Lavard | 12 March 1096; Son of Eric I of Denmark and Boedil Thurgotsdatter | 1115 – 7 January 1131 | Duchy of Schleswig | Ingeborg of Kiev; 1116 four children | 7 January 1131; Ringsted aged 34 | Titled dux Daciae (i.e. Duke of Denmark) |
| Magnus Nielsen | c.1106 Son of Niels of Denmark and Margaret Fredkulla | 7 January 1131 – 4 June 1134 | Duchy of Schleswig | Richeza of Poland c.1127 two children | 4 June 1134; Battle of Fotevik aged 27-28 | King of Västergötland |
Direct rule by Denmark (1134-1150)
| Valdemar I | 14 January 1131; Schleswig; Son of Canute I Lavard and Ingeborg of Kiev | 1150–1157 1173 – 12 May 1182 | Duchy of Schleswig | Sophia of Minsk c.1144 Viborg Cathedral eight children | 12 May 1182; Vordingborg aged 51 | At least between 1152 and 1154, he was titled dux Daciae (i.e. Duke of Denmark), possibly referring to exclusive possession of the duchy of Schleswig, opposing to the shared dominion in Denmark. |
| Canute II | c.1110 Third son of Prince Henry of Denmark and Ingrid Ragnvaldsdotter | 1157 – 12 March 1162 | Duchy of Schleswig | Unmarried | 12 March 1162 aged 51-52 | |
| Boris | c.1110 Fourth son of Prince Henry of Denmark and Ingrid Ragnvaldsdotter | 12 March 1162 – 1167 | Duchy of Schleswig | Unmarried | 1167 aged 56-57 | |
| Christopher | 1150; Illegitimate son of Valdemar I | 1167 – 1173 | Duchy of Schleswig | Unmarried | 1173 aged 22-23 | |
Direct rule by Denmark (1173-1183)
| Valdemar II the Victorious | 9 May 1170; Ribe; Son of Valdemar I and Sophia of Minsk | 1183–1232 | Duchy of Schleswig | Dagmar of Bohemia; 1205 one son Berengaria of Portugal; 1214 four children | 28 March 1241; Vordingborg aged 70 | Titled dux slesvicensis (i.e. Sleswickian duke), represented by the regent Bishop Valdemar Knudsen (1182–1193), Valdemar II became Danish king in 1202. He associated his elder children to the government. |
| Valdemar (III) the Young | c.1209 Son of Valdemar II and Dagmar of Bohemia | 1209–1218 | Duchy of Schleswig | Eleanor of Portugal; 24 June 1229; Ribe Cathedral one child | 28 November 1231; Refsnæs, near Kalundborg aged 21-22 | Titled dux slesvicensis (i.e. Sleswickian duke), represented by the regent Bishop Valdemar Knudsen (1182–1193), Valdemar II became Danish king in 1202. He associated his elder children to the government. |
| Eric (I) Ploughpenny | c.1216 First son of Valdemar II and Berengaria of Portugal | 1218–1232 | Duchy of Schleswig | Jutta of Saxony; 17 November 1239 six children | 9 August 1250 near Gottorf Castle aged 33-34 | Titled dux slesvicensis (i.e. Sleswickian duke), represented by the regent Bishop Valdemar Knudsen (1182–1193), Valdemar II became Danish king in 1202. He associated his elder children to the government. |
| Abel I | c.1218 Second son of Valdemar II and Berengaria of Portugal | 1232 – 29 June 1252 | Duchy of Schleswig | Matilda of Holstein; 25 April 1237; Schleswig Cathedral four children | 29 June 1252; Eiderstedt aged 33-34 | Supported by the counts of Holstein, he became the first ruler of what can be considered a semi-independent Schleswig. Also king of Denmark from 1250. |
| Valdemar III | c.1238 First son of Abel and Matilda of Holstein | 29 June 1252 – 1257 | Duchy of Schleswig | Unmarried | c.1257 aged 18-19 | |
| Eric I | c.1242 Second son of Abel and Matilda of Holstein | 1257 – 27 May 1272 | Duchy of Schleswig | Margaret of Rugen; 1259 or 1260 three children | 27 May 1272 aged 29-30 | Brothers of Valdemar III, divided their inheritance. |
| Abel II | 1252; Third son of Abel and Matilda of Holstein | 1257 – 2 April 1279 | Duchy of Schleswig (at Langeland) | A daughter of Gunzelin III, Count of Schwerin no children | 2 April 1279 aged 26-27 | Brothers of Valdemar III, divided their inheritance. |
Langeland reabsorbed in Schleswig
| Valdemar IV | c.1265 First son of Eric I and Margaret of Rugen | 27 May 1272 – 7 July 1312 | Duchy of Schleswig | Elisabeth of Saxe-Lauenburg; 1287 one child Anastasia of Schwerin; 1306 no children | 7 July 1312 aged 46-47 | Children of Eric I, divided their inheritance in 1293. |
| Eric Long-Legs | 1272; Second son of Eric I and Margaret of Rugen | 1293 – 1310 | Duchy of Schleswig (at Langeland) | Sophia of Querfurt-Rosenberg no children | 1310 aged 37-38 | Children of Eric I, divided their inheritance in 1293. |
Langeland reabsorbed in Schleswig
| Eric II | c.1290 Son of Valdemar IV and Elisabeth of Saxe-Lauenburg | 7 July 1312 – 12 March 1325 | Duchy of Schleswig | Adelaide of Holstein-Rendsburg; 1313 two children | 12 March 1325 aged 34-35 | |
| Regency of Gerhard III, Count of Holstein-Rendsburg (1325-1326) | | | | | | Under regency of their uncle, divided their inheritance. In 1326, Valdemar became king of Denmark, while his regent maed himself the Duke of Schleswig. In 1330 Valdemar returned to his position as Duke. In 1340 Helvig married the King of Denmark. |
| Valdemar V | c.1314 Son of Eric II and Adelaide of Holstein-Rendsburg | 12 March 1325 – 1326 1330–1364 | Duchy of Schleswig (at 3/4 of Schleswig) | Richardis of Schwerin c.1329? two children | c.1364 | Under regency of their uncle, divided their inheritance. In 1326, Valdemar became king of Denmark, while his regent maed himself the Duke of Schleswig. In 1330 Valdemar returned to his position as Duke. In 1340 Helvig married the King of Denmark. |
| Helvig | 1320; Daughter of Eric II and Adelaide of Holstein-Rendsburg | 12 March 1325 – 1374 | Duchy of Schleswig (at 1/4 of Schleswig) | Valdemar IV of Denmark; 1340; Sønderborg Castle six children | 1374; Esrum Abbey aged 53-54 | Under regency of their uncle, divided their inheritance. In 1326, Valdemar became king of Denmark, while his regent maed himself the Duke of Schleswig. In 1330 Valdemar returned to his position as Duke. In 1340 Helvig married the King of Denmark. |
3/4 Schleswig briefly annexed to Schauenburg control (1326-1330); 1/4 Schleswig to Denmark
| Henry I | c.1342 Son of Valdemar V and Richardis of Schwerin | 1364 – August 1375 | Duchy of Schleswig (at 3/4 Schleswig) | Kunigunde no children | August 1375 aged 32-33 | |

=== House of Schauenburg (1325-1459) ===
| Ruler | Born | Reign | Ruling part | Consort | Death | Notes |
|---|---|---|---|---|---|---|
| Gerhard I the Great | 1292; Son of Henry I, Count of Holstein-Rendsburg and Heilwig of Bronckhorst | 1326 – 1330 | Duchy of Schleswig | Sophia of Werle; 1315 four children | 1 April 1340; Randers aged 47-48 | Profited from his regency to decome Duke of Schleswig. Eventually abdicated in 1330. |
Schleswig returned to Estridsen domain (1330-75)
| Henry II of Iron | 1317; First son of Gerhard I and Sophia of Werle | August 1375 – 1384 | Duchy of Schleswig | Matilda of Lippe one child Ingeborg of Mecklenburg-Schwerin before 1374 four children | 1384 | Nicholas and Henry ruled jointly as sons of Gerhard III. In 1375 they inherited the Duchy of Schleswig from the House of Estridsen. In 1384, with the death of his brother, Nicholas associated his nephews (Gerhard and Albert, sons of Henry) to power. In 1386 he abdicated of Schleswig to his older nephew Gerhard, who assumed alone this lands. |
| Nicholas I | 1321; Second son of Gerhard I and Sophia of Werle | August 1375 – 1386 | Duchy of Schleswig | 8 May 1397 | Elisabeth of Brunswick-Lüneburg; 1354 one child | Nicholas and Henry ruled jointly as sons of Gerhard III. In 1375 they inherited the Duchy of Schleswig from the House of Estridsen. In 1384, with the death of his brother, Nicholas associated his nephews (Gerhard and Albert, sons of Henry) to power. In 1386 he abdicated of Schleswig to his older nephew Gerhard, who assumed alone this lands. |
| Gerhard II | 1367; Son of Henry I and Ingeborg of Mecklenburg-Schwerin | 1386 – 5 August 1404 | Duchy of Schleswig | Catherine Elisabeth of Brunswick-Lüneburg; 1390 six children | 5 August 1404; Dithmarschen aged 36-37 | After the abdication of Nicholas in Schleswig, Gerhard took over the duchy, and assumed Holstein-Rendsburg only after the former's death in 1397. |
| Regency of Catherine Elisabeth of Brunswick-Lüneburg and Henry III, Count of Holstein-Rendsburg and Prince-Bishop of Osnabrück (1404–1413) | | | | | | Died without descendants. Passed the land to his brothers. |
| Henry II | 1397; First son of Gerhard II and Catherine Elisabeth of Brunswick-Lüneburg | 5 August 1404 – 28 May 1427 | Duchy of Schleswig | Unmarried | 28 May 1427; Flensburg aged 29-30 | Died without descendants. Passed the land to his brothers. |
| Adolph | 1401; Second son of Gerhard II and Catherine Elisabeth of Brunswick-Lüneburg | 28 May 1427 – 4 December 1459 | Duchy of Schleswig | Matilda before 1433 no children Margareta of Mansfeld; 1433 no children | 4 December 1459; Bad Segeberg aged 57-58 | Sons of Gerhard II, ruled jointly in Holstein-Rendsburg. As Gerhard also wanted to rule in Schleswig he claimed (unsuccessfully) this duchy for himself against his brother. Adolph was the mightiest vassal of Danish crown at his time, gaining royal Danish recognition in 1440. After Adolph's death his patrimony is annexed by Denmark. |
| Gerhard III | 1404; Third son of Gerhard II and Catherine Elisabeth of Brunswick-Lüneburg | 28 May 1427 – 24 July 1433 | Duchy of Schleswig | Agnes of Baden; 2 June 1432; Baden ten children | 24 July 1433; Emmerich am Rhein aged 28-29 | Sons of Gerhard II, ruled jointly in Holstein-Rendsburg. As Gerhard also wanted to rule in Schleswig he claimed (unsuccessfully) this duchy for himself against his brother. Adolph was the mightiest vassal of Danish crown at his time, gaining royal Danish recognition in 1440. After Adolph's death his patrimony is annexed by Denmark. |
Rendsburg and Schleswig were annexed to Denmark; with the Rendsburg patrimony the Danish formed the Duchy of Holstein

== Under domain of Oldenburg ==
In 1459, after the annexation of both Schleswig and Holstein, Christian I of Denmark created two separate states: the Duchy of Schleswig and Duchy of Holstein, to be ruled by two different branches of the House of Oldenburg over the next few centuries. In 1864, following the Second Schleswig War, the Duchy of Schleswig-Holstein became an occupied territory of the German Confederation and two years later, following the Austro-Prussian War, part of the new Prussian Province of Schleswig-Holstein.

== See also ==
- List of Danish monarchs
- List of rulers of Schleswig-Holstein
