= Abel, Lord of Langeland =

Abel
- Lord of Langeland
- Born: 1252
- Died: 2 April 1279 (aged 26–27)
- Spouse: a daughter of Gunzelin III, Count of Schwerin
- Issue: Margaret, abbess of Zarrentin
- House: Estridsen
- Father: Abel of Denmark
- Mother: Mechtild of Holstein

Abel Abelsøn (1252 – 2 April 1279), Lord of Langeland, was the third son of King Abel of Denmark, Duke of Schleswig, and younger brother of Valdemar III, Duke of Schleswig and Eric I, Duke of Schleswig. As a member of the ducal family, he held several fiefs in Southern Denmark.

== Life ==
Abel was born in 1252 as the third and posthumous son of King Abel of Denmark, Duke of Schleswig, by his wife, Mechtild of Holstein. In the settlement with his brother Eric after the death of their elder brother Duke Valdemar III, Abel received the cities of Svendborg, Rudkøbing, and possibly also Faaborg on the island of Funen, and as a fief the island of Langeland. Abel died on Easter Day 1279 in Svendborg and was buried in Greyfriars’ Abbey.

At his death, he left only a daughter Margaret, who entered the convent of Zarrentin in Mecklenburg and donated her father's properties to her relatives, the counts of Holstein. They later sold it to King Eric VI of Denmark.

== Marriage and issue ==
Abel appears to have married a daughter of Gunzelin III, Count of Schwerin:

- Margaret, abbess of Zarrentin. As abbess, she instituted a requiem mass for her father in 1317.

== Ancestry ==
Ancestors of Abel, Lord of Langeland

16. Canute Lavard
8. Valdemar I of Denmark
17. Ingeborg of Kiev
4. Valdemar II of Denmark
18. Volodar, Prince of Minsk and Hrodno
9. Sophia of Minsk
19. Richeza of Poland
2. Abel of Denmark
20. Afonso I of Portugal
10. Sancho I of Portugal
21. Maud of Savoy
5. Berengaria of Portugal
22. Ramon Berenguer IV, Count of Barcelona
11. Dulce of Aragon
23. Petronila of Aragon
1. Abel Abelsøn, Lord of Langeland
24. Adolf II, Count of Holstein
12. Adolf III, Count of Holstein
25. Matilda of Schwarzburg
6. Adolf IV, Count of Holstein
26. Burchard II of Querfurt, Burgrave of Magdeburg
13. Adelheid of Querfurt
27. Matilda of Gleichen
3. Matilda of Holstein
28. Bernhard II, Lord of Lippe
14. Hermann II, Lord of Lippe
29. Heilwig of Are-Hostaden
7. Heilwig of Lippe
30. Simon, Count of Tecklenburg
15. Oda of Tecklenburg
31. Oda of Berg-Altena
