= Richardis of Schwerin =

Richardis of Schwerin may refer to:

- Richardis of Schwerin, Duchess of Schleswig (d. bef. 1386), wife of Valdemar III of Denmark (Valdemar V, Duke of Schleswig) and daughter of Günzelin VI, Count of Schwerin-Wittenburg. Aunt of the second Richardis.
- Richardis of Schwerin, Queen of Sweden (ca. 1344–1377), wife of Albert of Sweden and daughter of Otto I, Count of Schwerin-Wittenburg. Niece of the first Richardis.
