= Valdemar IV of Schleswig =

Valdemar IV

Duke of Schleswig
- Tenure: 1283 - 1312
- Predecessor: Eric I
- Successor: Eric II
- Born: c. 1262
- Died: 1312
- Noble family: Estridsen
- Spouses: Elisabeth of Saxe-Lauenburg; Anastasia of Schwerin
- Issue: Eric II, Duke of Schleswig
- Father: Eric I, Duke of Schleswig
- Mother: Margaret of Rugia

Valdemar IV Eriksøn (born c. 1262, died 1312) was Duke of Schleswig from 1283 until his death in 1312. He was the eldest son of Duke Eric I of Schleswig and Margaret of Rugia.

== Early life ==
At the death of his father Duke Eric I in 1272, Valdemar was only about 10 years old. For the following ten years, King Eric V of Denmark, feudal overlord over the Duchy of Schleswig, refused to install Valdemar in his father's duchy. Only in 1283, at a meeting of the Danehof in the city of Vordingborg, did the Danish magnates force King Eric to install Valdemar as duke. In 1284 he granted city rights to the city of Flensburg.

== Duke of Schleswig and conflict with the King ==
However, Valdemar was not content and also claimed the island of Als, as well as the Crown lands of Schleswig. When in 1284 a judgment of the Danehof ruled against the claims of Duke Valdemar, he occupied the island of Als by force. However, the military campaign proved disadvantageous for the duke, and as he intended to travel north to gain support in Sweden and Norway, he was captured by King Eric and confined at Søborg Castle in 1285. He was released the following year on condition that he abandoned almost all of his claims.

== Murder of King Eric ==
Just half a year later, in November 1286, King Eric was assassinated, and Duke Valdemar naturally fell under suspicion. The Queen Dowager, Agnes of Brandenburg, apparently shared the suspicion, but feared open aggression with the Duke. Instead, his support was achieved by accepting his claims and appointing him regent of the kingdom during the minority of King Eric's under age son and successor, Eric VI.

== Renewed conflict with the King ==
Already in 1289, the confidence between Duke Valdemar and Dowager Queen Agnes was breached and a clash occurred between the Duke and the followers of the Queen. Shortly after, Duke Valdemar even entered into a league with King Eric II of Norway, then at war with Denmark. Apparently, in 1295 Valdemar suffered a defeat at a naval battle in the channel of Grønsund. In 1297, a final settlement was concluded where Duke Valdemar among other things abandoned his claims to the disputed island of Als.

Minor disputes with King Eric VI continued during the following years. On a whole, however, the Duke was hence on friendly terms with the King and supported him in his wars in Sweden and the Holy Roman Empire. In 1311 he participated in the magnificent tournament held by King Eric in Rostock.

== Death ==
Duke Valdemar died in the spring of 1312. He was succeeded as Duke by his son Eric II who had already been his father's coruler for several years. Valdemar was buried in the Schleswig Cathedral.

== Marriage and issue ==
In 1287 Duke Valdemar married Elisabeth of Saxe-Lauenburg, a daughter of John I, Duke of Saxony. This marriage produced the only legitimate son of Duke Valdemar:

- Eric II (c. 1290 – 1325), Duke of Schleswig 1312–1325

In 1306 he married Anastasia of Schwerin, a daughter of Niklot I, Count of Schwerin.

== Ancestry ==
Ancestors of Valdemar IV of Schleswig

16. Valdemar I of Denmark
8. Valdemar II of Denmark
17. Sophia of Minsk
4. Abel of Denmark
18. Sancho I of Portugal
9. Berengaria of Portugal
19. Dulce of Aragon
2. Eric I, Duke of Schleswig
20. Adolf III, Count of Holstein
10. Adolf IV, Count of Holstein
21. Adelheid of Querfurt
5. Matilda of Holstein
22. Hermann II, Lord of Lippe
11. Heilwig of Lippe
23. Oda of Tecklenburg
1. Valdemar IV, Duke of Schleswig
24. Jaromar I, Prince of Rügen
12. Wizlaw I, Prince of Rügen
25. Hildegard of Denmark
6. Jaromar II, Prince of Rügen
13. Margaret, niece of bishop Absalon
3. Margaret of Rügen
28. Mestwin I, Duke of Pomerania
14. Swietopelk II, Duke of Pomerania
29. Swinisława, maybe daughter of Mieszko III the Old
7. Euphemia of Pomerania
30. Odon of Poznań
15. Euphrosyne of Poznań
31. Viacheslava of Halych

Valdemar IV, Duke of Schleswig House of Estridsen
Regnal titles
| Vacant Title last held by Eric I | Duke of Schleswig; 1283–1312 | Succeeded by Eric II |
