= Eric II of Schleswig =

Duke of Schleswig from 1312 to 1325

Eric II Valdemarsøn (c. 1290 – 12 March 1325) was Duke of Schleswig from 1312 until his death in 1325. He was the only son of Valdemar IV, Duke of Schleswig.

== Early life ==
Eric was born c. 1290 as the only legitimate son of Duke Valdemar IV of Schleswig in his first marriage with Elisabeth of Saxe-Lauenburg, a daughter of John I, Duke of Saxony. Already during the lifetime of Valdemar IV, he acted as his father's coruler and used the title of duke.

== Duke of Schleswig ==
At the death of Valdemar IV in the spring of 1312, he immediately succeeded his father as Duke of Schleswig. Shortly afterwards, he participated in the expedition of his feudal overlord, King Eric VI of Denmark, to Rostock. During this expedition, on 30 June in the camp outside Warnemünde, he was formally installed as Duke.

As Duke, he claimed the fief of Langeland after his deceased uncle, Eric Longbone, Lord of Langeland. These and other disputes with King Eric, were settled at the settlement in Horsens on 9 August 1313, in which Eric renounced his claims to Langeland but received the Crown lands of the Duchy of Schleswig.

When King Eric VI of Denmark died in 1319, Duke Eric was briefly candidate to the vacant throne of Denmark. Ultimately, Eric VI's brother, Christopher, was elected King. However, part of the price Christopher had to pay to accede to the throne, was to accept the right of Duke Eric to the fief of Langeland.

== Death ==
Duke Eric died on 12 March 1325. He was buried in the Schleswig Cathedral.

== Marriage and issue ==
In 1313 Eric married Adelaide of Holstein-Rendsburg, a daughter of Henry I, Count of Holstein-Rendsburg.

- Valdemar III (1314–1364), King of Denmark 1326–1329, Duke of Schleswig as Valdemar V 1325–1326 and 1330–1364.
- Helvig of Schleswig (died 1374), married Valdemar IV, King of Denmark

== Ancestry ==
Ancestors of Eric II of Schleswig

8. Abel of Denmark
4. Eric I, Duke of Schleswig
9. Matilda of Holstein
2. Valdemar IV, Duke of Schleswig
10. Jaromar II, Prince of Rügen
5. Margaret of Rügen
11. Euphemia of Pomerania
1. Eric II, Duke of Schleswig
12. Albert I, Duke of Saxony
6. John I, Duke of Saxony
13. Helene of Brunswick-Lüneburg
3. Elisabeth of Saxe-Lauenburg
14. Birger Jarl
7. Ingeborg Birgersdotter
15. Ingeborg Eriksdotter of Sweden

Eric II, Duke of Schleswig House of Estridsen
Regnal titles
Preceded by Valdemar IV	Duke of Schleswig; 1312–1325	Succeeded by Valdemar V
