= Coronation of the Danish monarch =

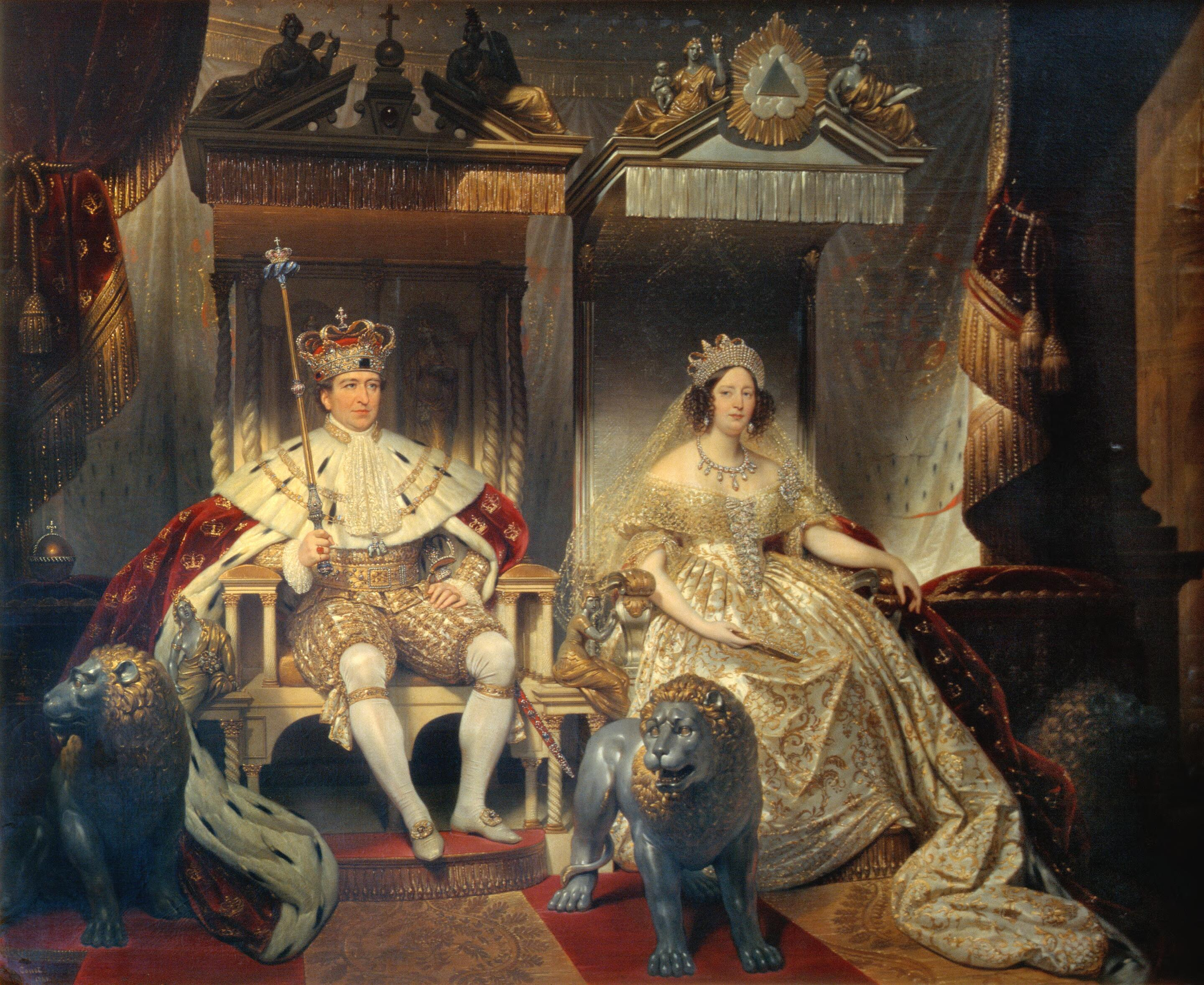
Anointing of King Christian VIII and Queen Caroline Amalie in 1840. Painting by Joseph-Désiré Court, 1841.

The coronation of the Danish monarch was a religious ceremony in which the accession of the Danish monarch was marked by a coronation ceremony. It was held in various forms from 1170 to 1840, mostly in Lund Cathedral in Lund, St. Mary's Cathedral in Copenhagen and in the chapel of Frederiksborg Palace in Hillerød.

Enthronements of the Danish monarch may be historically divided into three distinct types of rituals: the medieval coronation, which existed during the period of elective monarchy; the anointing ritual, which replaced coronation with the introduction of absolute monarchy in 1660; and finally the simple proclamation, which has been used since the introduction of the constitutional monarchy in 1849.

== Coronations of the elective monarchy ==
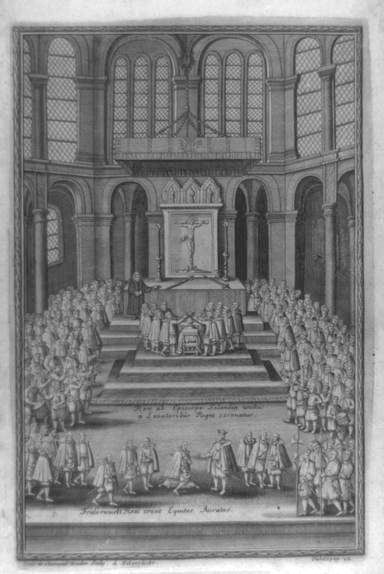
Coronation of King Frederick II in St. Mary's Cathedral in Copenhagen in 1559.

Historically an elective monarchy, the Danish kings had been elected and acclaimed at the Thing assemblies; this continued even after the tradition of coronations began. Ultimately, the acclamation rite only ceased with the introduction of hereditary monarchy in 1660, the 1657 acclamation of crown prince Christian (the later Christian V of Denmark) being the last occasion. The first coronation in Scandinavia took place in Bergen in Norway in 1163 or 1164. The first coronation in Denmark was that of Canute VI in St. Bendt's Church in Ringsted in 1170. The only Danish kings between 1170 and 1448 to not be crowned were Valdemar III, Valdemar IV, and Olaf II.

The medieval monarchs used various locations for their coronations, with Lund Cathedral in Lund, the archepiscopal seat of Denmark, being the most preferred. Other locations include Viborg, Vordingborg, Kalmar and Ribe. After the accession of the House of Oldenburg to the Danish throne in 1448, the coronations were held in St. Mary's Cathedral in Copenhagen, and usually performed by the Bishop of Zealand.

The coronation ritual (as of 1537) began with a procession of the ruler and his consort into St. Mary's cathedral in Copenhagen, followed by the Danish Crown Regalia. The monarch was seated before the altar, where he swore to govern justly, preserve the Lutheran religion, support schools, and help the poor. Following this, the king was anointed on the lower right arm and between the shoulders, but not on the head. Then the royal couple retired to a tented enclosure where they were robed in royal attire, returning to hear a sermon, the Kyrie and Gloria, and then a prayer and the Epistle reading.

Following the Epistle, the king knelt before the altar, where he was first given a sword. After flourishing and sheathing it, the still-kneeling monarch was crowned by the clergy and nobility, who jointly placed the diadem upon their ruler's head. The sceptre and orb were presented, then returned to attendants. The queen was anointed and crowned in a similar manner, but she received only a sceptre and not an orb. Finally, a choral hymn was sung, following which the newly crowned king and queen listened to a second sermon and the reading of the Gospel, which brought the service to an end.

== Anointings of the absolute monarchy ==
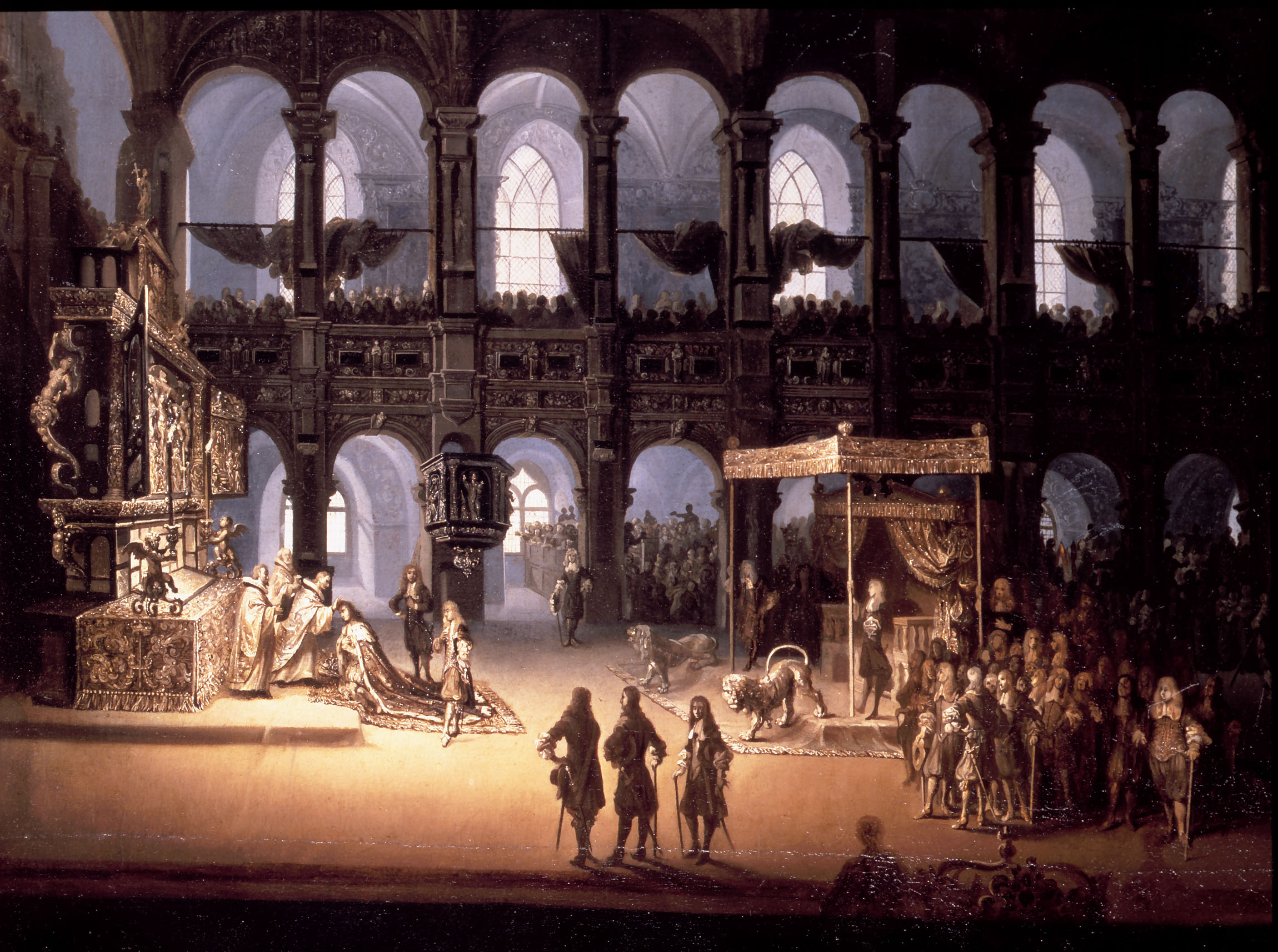
Anointing of King Christian V and Queen Charlotte Amalie at Frederiksborg Palace in 1671.

With the introduction of absolute monarchy in 1660, the full coronation ritual was replaced with a ceremony of anointing, where the new king would arrive at the coronation site already wearing the crown, where he was then anointed.

The anointings were held in the chapel of Frederiksborg Palace in Hillerød, with the exception of the 1767 anointing of King Christian VII which was held in the chapel of Christiansborg Palace in Copenhagen.

== Proclamations of the constitutional monarchy ==
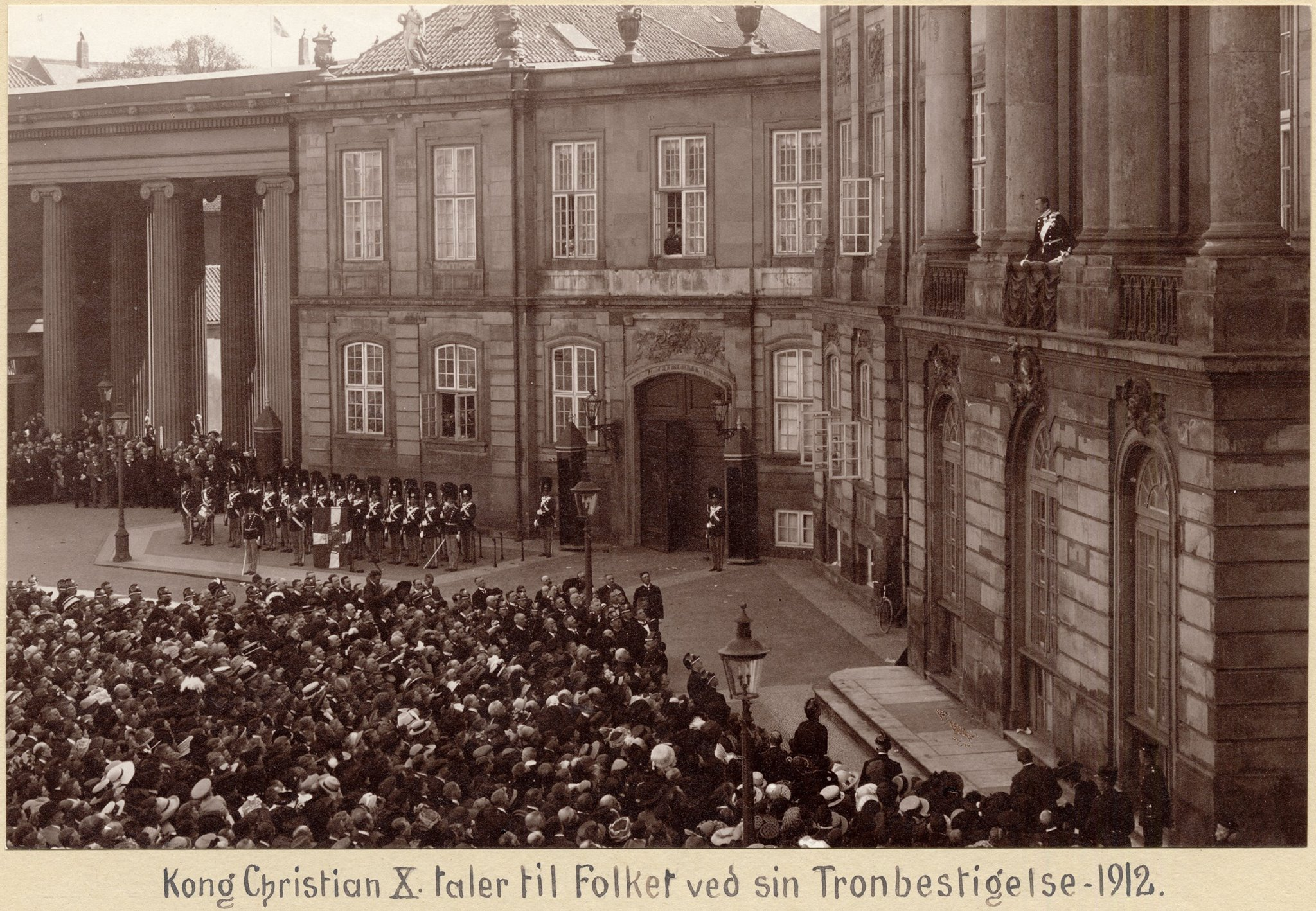
Proclamation of King Christian X from the balcony of Christian VII's Palace at Amalienborg in 1912.

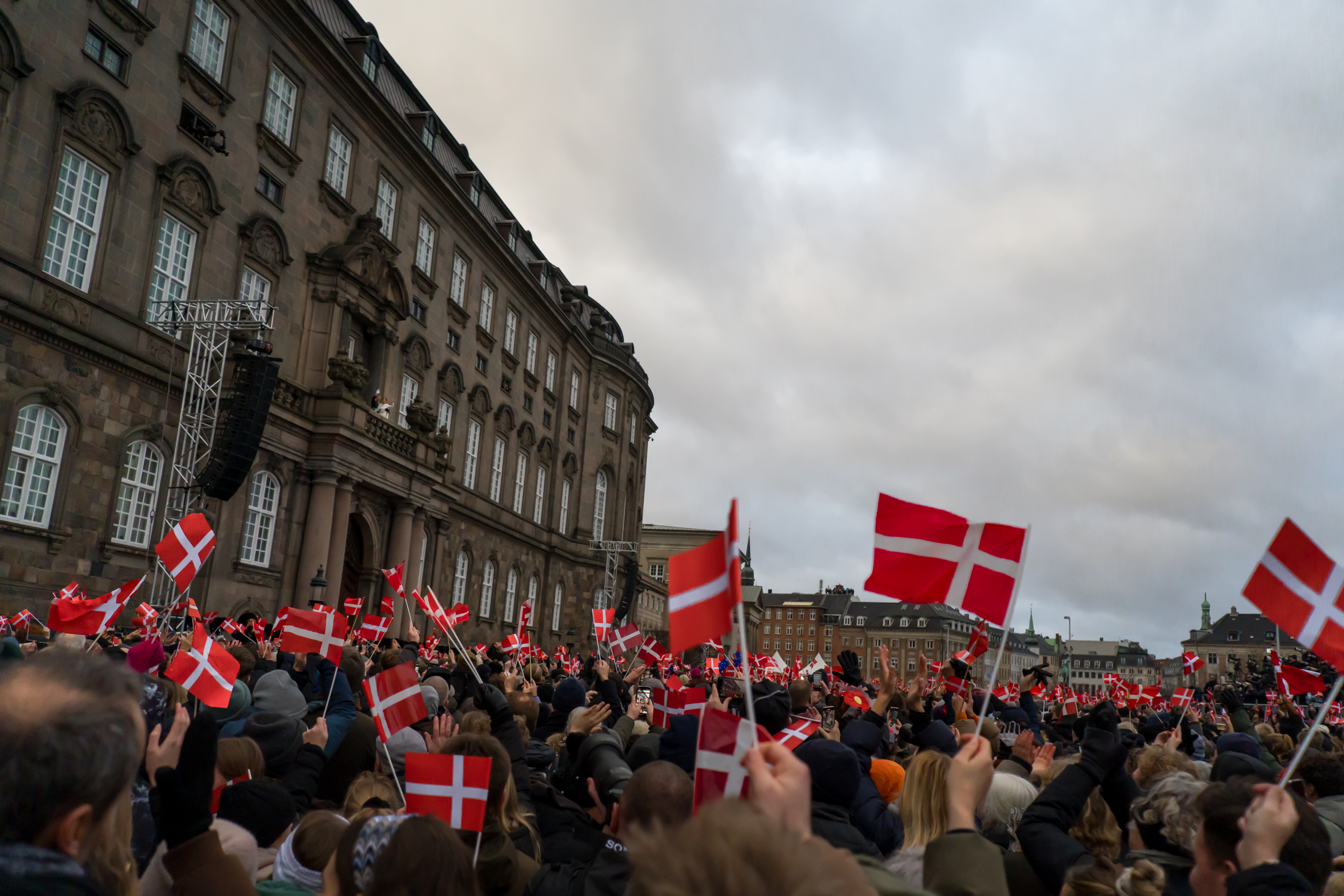
The proclamation of King Frederik X from the balcony of Christiansborg Palace on 14 January 2024

This rite was in turn abolished with the introduction of the Danish constitution in 1849. Today the crown of Denmark is only displayed at the monarch's funeral, when it sits atop their coffin. The present king, Frederik X, did not have any formal enthronement service; a public announcement of his accession was made from the balcony of Christiansborg Palace, with the new sovereign being proclaimed by his prime minister at the time, Mette Frederiksen, then cheered with a ninefold "hurrah" by the crowds below.

== Historical list of coronations ==
=== Coronations ===
| Date | Site | Picture | Name | Reign | Other regnal titles | Ref |
|---|---|---|---|---|---|---|
| 25 June 1170 | St. Bendt's Church | | Canute VI | 25 June 1170 – 12 November 1202 | | |
| 1202 | Lund Cathedral | | Valdemar II | 1202–1241 | | |
| 1218 | Schleswig | | Valdemar the Young | 1215–1231 | | |
| 30 May 1232 | Lund Cathedral | | Eric IV | 1232–1250 | | |
| 1 November 1250 | Unknown | | Abel with Matilda of Holstein | 1250–1252 | | |
| 25 December 1252 | Lund Cathedral | | Christopher I with Margaret Sambiria | 1252–1259 | | |
| 25 December 1259 | Viborg | | Eric V | 1259–1286 | | |
| 25 December 1287 | Lund Cathedral | | Eric VI | 1286–1319 | | |
| 15 August 1324 | Vordingborg | | Christopher II with Eric | For Christopher II: 1320 – 1326; 1329 – 2 August 1332; For Eric: 1321–1326; 1329–1332 | | |
| 17 June 1397 | Storkyrkan | | Eric VII | 1396 – 24 September 1439 | King of Norway; King of Sweden | |
| 1 January 1443 | Ribe Cathedral | | Christopher III with Dorothea of Brandenburg | 9 April 1440 – 5 January 1448 | King of Norway; King of Sweden | |
| 28 October 1449 | St. Mary's Cathedral, Copenhagen | | Christian I with Dorothea of Brandenburg | 1 September 1448 – 21 May 1481 | King of Norway; King of Sweden | |
| 18 May 1483 | St. Mary's Cathedral, Copenhagen | | John with Christina of Saxony | 21 May 1481 – 20 February 1513 | King of Norway; King of Sweden | |
| 11 June 1514 | St. Mary's Cathedral, Copenhagen | | Christian II with Isabella of Austria | 20 February 1513 – 13 April 1523 | King of Norway; King of Sweden | |
| 7 August 1524 | St. Mary's Cathedral, Copenhagen | | Frederick I with Sophie of Pomerania | 13 April 1523 – 10 April 1533 | Elected King of Norway | |
| 12 August 1537 | St. Mary's Cathedral, Copenhagen | | Christian III with Dorothea of Saxe-Lauenburg | 4 July 1534 – 1 January 1559 | King of Norway | |
| 20 August 1559 | St. Mary's Cathedral, Copenhagen | | Frederick II with Sophie of Mecklenburg-Güstrow | 1 January 1559 – 4 April 1588 | King of Norway | |
| 29 August 1596 | St. Mary's Cathedral, Copenhagen | | Christian IV with Anne Catherine of Brandenburg | 4 April 1588 – 28 February 1648 | King of Norway | |
| 23 November 1648 | St. Mary's Cathedral, Copenhagen | | Frederick III with Sophie Amalie of Brunswick-Lüneburg | 28 February 1648 – 9 February 1670 | King of Norway | |

=== Anointings (1660–1849) ===
| Date | Site | Picture | Name | Reign | Other regnal titles |
|---|---|---|---|---|---|
| 7 June 1671 | Frederiksborg Palace Chapel | | Christian V | 9 February 1670 – 25 August 1699 | King of Norway |
| 15 April 1700 | Frederiksborg Palace Chapel | | Frederick IV | 25 August 1699 – 12 October 1730 | King of Norway |
| 6 June 1731 | Frederiksborg Palace Chapel | | Christian VI | 12 October 1730 – 6 August 1746 | King of Norway |
| 4 September 1747 | Frederiksborg Palace Chapel | | Frederick V with Louise of Great Britain | 6 August 1746 – 14 January 1766 | King of Norway |
| 1 May 1767 | Christiansborg Palace Chapel | | Christian VII with Caroline Matilda of Great Britain | 14 January 1766 – 13 March 1808 | King of Norway |
| 31 July 1815 | Frederiksborg Palace Chapel | | Frederick VI with Marie of Hesse-Kassel | 13 March 1808 – 3 December 1839 | King of Norway |
| 28 June 1840 | Frederiksborg Palace Chapel | | Christian VIII with Caroline Amalie of Augustenburg | 3 December 1839 – 20 January 1848 | King of Norway (prior of being king of Denmark) |

=== Proclamations (1849-present) ===
| Date | Site | Picture | Name | Reign | Prime Minister |
|---|---|---|---|---|---|
| 16 November 1863 | Christiansborg Palace | | Christian IX | 15 November 1863 – 29 January 1906 | Carl Christian Hall |
| 30 January 1906 | Amalienborg Palace | | Frederick VIII | 29 January 1906 – 14 May 1912 | Jens Christian Christensen |
| 15 May 1912 | Amalienborg Palace | | Christian X | 14 May 1912 – 20 April 1947 | Klaus Berntsen |
| 20 April 1947 | Christiansborg Palace | | Frederik IX | 20 April 1947 – 14 January 1972 | Knud Kristensen |
| 15 January 1972 | Christiansborg Palace | | Margrethe II | 14 January 1972 – 14 January 2024 | Jens Otto Krag |
| 14 January 2024 | Christiansborg Palace | | Frederik X | 14 January 2024 – present | Mette Frederiksen |

== See also ==
- Coronations
- Monarchy of Denmark
- Coronation Chair of Denmark
