= Haandfæstning =

Document issued by the kings of Denmark from 13th to the 17th century

A Haandfæstning (Modern Danish: Håndfæstning & Modern Norwegian: Håndfestning, lit. "Handbinding", plural Haandfæstninger) was a document issued by the kings of Denmark from 13th to the 17th century, preceding and during the realm's personal union with the kingdoms of Sweden and Norway. Following Sweden's secession from the Kalmar Union, similar documents were also issued by its kings. In many ways it is a Scandinavian parallel to the English Magna Carta.

== History ==
The haandfæstning was the result of the strength of the power of the nobility. The first Danish king who was forced to sign this kind of charter was King Eric V in 1282. It was used as a regular coronation charter for the first time in 1320. Between 1440 and 1648 it was a normal condition for the recognition of a new king. When absolute monarchy was introduced in 1660 the last haandfæstning was mortified.

Unlike in England there was no permanent charter to sign; every new king had to accept a new one that applied to his own reign. On the other hand, all haandfæstninger were based on the same model. The king had to promise that he would rule as a just king; that he would co-operate with the nobility; that he would never imprison any free man; that all leading offices (what one would today call "cabinet minister posts") and all local administration would be filled only by noblemen; and that questions of war and peace depended on the acceptance of the nobility.

The charters did not necessarily transform the kings into puppets; most of them were able to create a solid base of power during their reign. And hardly any Danish king of the period totally kept the rules of the håndfæstning. The severity of the demands of the nobility also wavered from time to time.

== End of the era ==
Absolutism was underpinned by a written constitution for the first time in Europe in 1665 Kongeloven ("King's Law") of Denmark–Norway, which ordered that the Monarch "shall from this day forth be revered and considered the most perfect and supreme person on the Earth by all his subjects, standing above all human laws and having no judge above his person, neither in spiritual nor temporal matters, except God alone". This law consequently authorized the king to abolish all other centers of power. Most important was the abolition of the Council of the Realm.

== Sources ==
- Samling af danske Kongers Haandfæstninger og andre lignende Acter. Af Geheimearchivets Aarsberetninger. Copenhagen, 1856–58, reprint 1974. (Source collection of handbindings in Danish and Latin)
