= Henry, Duke of Schleswig =

Duke of Schleswig from 1364 to 1375

Henry

Duke of Schleswig
- Reign: 1364–1375
- Born: c. 1342
- Died: August 1375
- Burial: Sorø Klosterkirke
- Spouse: Kunigunde
- House: Estridsen (Abelslægten line)
- Father: Valdemar III of Denmark
- Mother: Richardis of Schwerin

Henry, Duke of Schleswig (c. 1342 – August 1375) was Duke of Schleswig from 1364 until his death.

== Life and work ==
Henry was the younger son of King Valdemar III of Denmark, who was Duke of Schleswig as Valdemar V. His elder brother, Hereditary Prince Valdemar (c. 1338 – 1360) had co-signed several documents with his father. After Valdemar died in 1360, Henry took this rôle. His family was from the Abelslægten branch of the House of Estridsen, descended from the deposed King Abel of Denmark. His aunt was Helvig of Schleswig.

In 1364, Henry inherited only the some parts of the Duchy of Schleswig, because the southern part had been pledged to the counts of Holstein and another part had been given to his mother, Richardis of Schwerin, as her Wittum, to supply her during her widowhood. This left only a small part of the Duchy for Henry, and he was often short of funds. In 1367, he even had to pledge the island of Langeland to the Danish noble Panter family. His territory was wedged between those of the strong King Valdemar IV of Denmark in the north and Counts Henry II (1317–1384) and Nicholas (1320–1397) of Holstein-Rendsburg in the south. He tried to mediate between the warring parties, but was caught in the crossfire. In June 1374, he handed over all his pledge deeds to the Danish king.

He died in August 1375 and was buried in the church of Sorø on Zealand, the largest island in Denmark.

== Marriage and issue ==
Henry married Kunigunde (d. 1386) whose family has not been identified. His marriage remained childless, and thus the line of dukes of Schleswig from the Abelslægten line of the House of Estridsen died out with Henry's death. His widow went to Denmark where she died. They were both buried in Sorø Klosterkirke.

Henry, Duke of Schleswig Abelslægten Cadet branch of the House of Estridsen Born: circa 1342 Died: August 1375
Preceded by Valdemar V	Duke of Schleswig; 1364–1375	Succeeded by Henry II and Nicholas
