= Eric V of Denmark =

King of Denmark from 1259 to 1286

Eric V Klipping
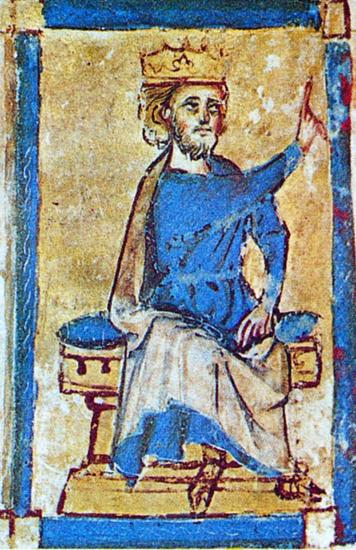
- The King in a 1282 miniature

King of Denmark and the Wends
- Reign: 1259–1286
- Coronation: 25 December 1259
- Predecessor: Christopher I
- Successor: Eric VI Menved
- Regent: Margaret Sambiria
- Born: 1249; Aalholm Castle, Lolland, Denmark.
- Died: 22 November 1286 (aged 36–37); Finderup, Viborg, Denmark
- Burial: Viborg Cathedral, Viborg, Denmark
- Spouse: Agnes of Brandenburg (m. 1273)
- Issue among others...: Eric VI, King of Denmark; Christopher II, King of Denmark; Martha, Queen of Sweden
Names
- Eric Christoffersen
- House: House of Estridsen
- Father: Christopher I of Denmark
- Mother: Margaret Sambiria

Eric V Klipping (1249 – 22 November 1286) was King of Denmark from 1259 to 1286. After his father Christopher I died, his mother Margaret Sambiria ruled Denmark in his name until 1266, proving to be a competent regent. Between 1261 and 1262, the young King Eric was a prisoner in Holstein following a military defeat. Afterwards, he lived in Brandenburg, where he was initially held captive by John I, Margrave of Brandenburg (c. 1213–1266). During his reign, he enforced his power successfully over the church but failed to do so on the nobility, he offended the nobles and was thereby forced to accept a charter (Håndfæstning) which limited his authority while confirming the rights of the nobles.

== Nickname ==
The king's nickname "Klipping" or "Glipping" refers to a medieval coin that has become "clipped" (a "clipped penny") or cut in order to indicate devaluation. The nickname is an unkind reference to his lack of trustworthiness. He "short-changed" his people and the monarchy.

== Regency ==
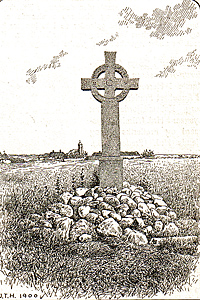
Memorial cross in Finderup village

When his father King Christopher I died in 1259, Eric was too young to rule in his own right. The Danish court appointed his mother, Queen Margaret, to rule as regent. She was the daughter of Duke Sambor II of Pomerania and Matilda of Mecklenburg, and was an intelligent woman. Immediately, she had to fight to keep her son on the throne from two powerful enemies; Archbishop Jacob Erlandsen (ca. 1220–1274) and Erik Abelsøn who was Duke of Schleswig from 1260 until his death in 1272. Archbishop Jacob had excommunicated the bishop who had anointed young Eric as king. Duke Eric was a nephew of King Christopher and had been in frequent conflict with the king.

Taking advantage of the situation, Chief Jaromar II of Rügen (c. 1218–1260) gathered an army of Wends and invaded Zealand. Queen Margaret raised an army, but was soundly defeated in 1259 near Ringsted. Jaromar went on to attack and pillage Copenhagen later that year. He shipped his army to Skåne in order to continue his campaign. Unfortunately for him, he encountered the wrath of a farmer's wife, who killed him outright. The Wends fled back to Rűgen.

Believing the Wendish incursion showed the queen was weak, Duke Eric rebelled. The queen was forced to raise another army and march to Jutland to put the Duke in his place. She defeated the duke, and while he negotiated a truce with her, he gathered allies in northern Germany to help him attack. The combined forces defeated Queen Margaret in 1261 at the Battle of Lohede south of Danevirke in Schleswig-Holstein. She and her son were captured and were forced to cede royal properties in southern Jutland to secure their release.

In 1260, Queen Margaret had released Archbishop Jacob from prison thinking he would be grateful, but he subsequently issued an interdict over all of Denmark trying to force her and Eric off the throne. In 1263, acting as regent of Denmark, the queen wrote to Pope Urban IV asking him to intervene with Archbishop Jacob. After several years of quibbling, the pope agreed to several items that the queen wanted. He issued a dispensation to alter the terms of the Danish succession that would permit women to inherit the Danish throne. This would make it possible for one of King Eric's sisters to become queen in the event of his death, because he had no children. Although Pope Urban IV gave his consent, it never became an issue. King Eric's son Eric Menved eventually succeeded to the Danish throne.

== Reign ==
As an adult ruler, King Eric V tried to enforce his power over the church and nobility. In the 1270s, the King attacked Småland. His conflict with the church was brought to a satisfying result, with the help of the Pope. By 1282, he had so offended the nobles throughout Denmark that he was forced to accept a charter (Danish: håndfæstning – a kind of a Danish Magna Carta) which limited his authority and guaranteed the ancient rights and customs that preserved the power of the nobles. The King signed the charter at Nyborg Castle, recognized as Denmark's first-ever constitution in existence. However at the time of King Eric's death, the rights and guarantees of the 1282 charter would lose their effectiveness, since the next king would not be bound by the same agreement.

== Mysterious death ==
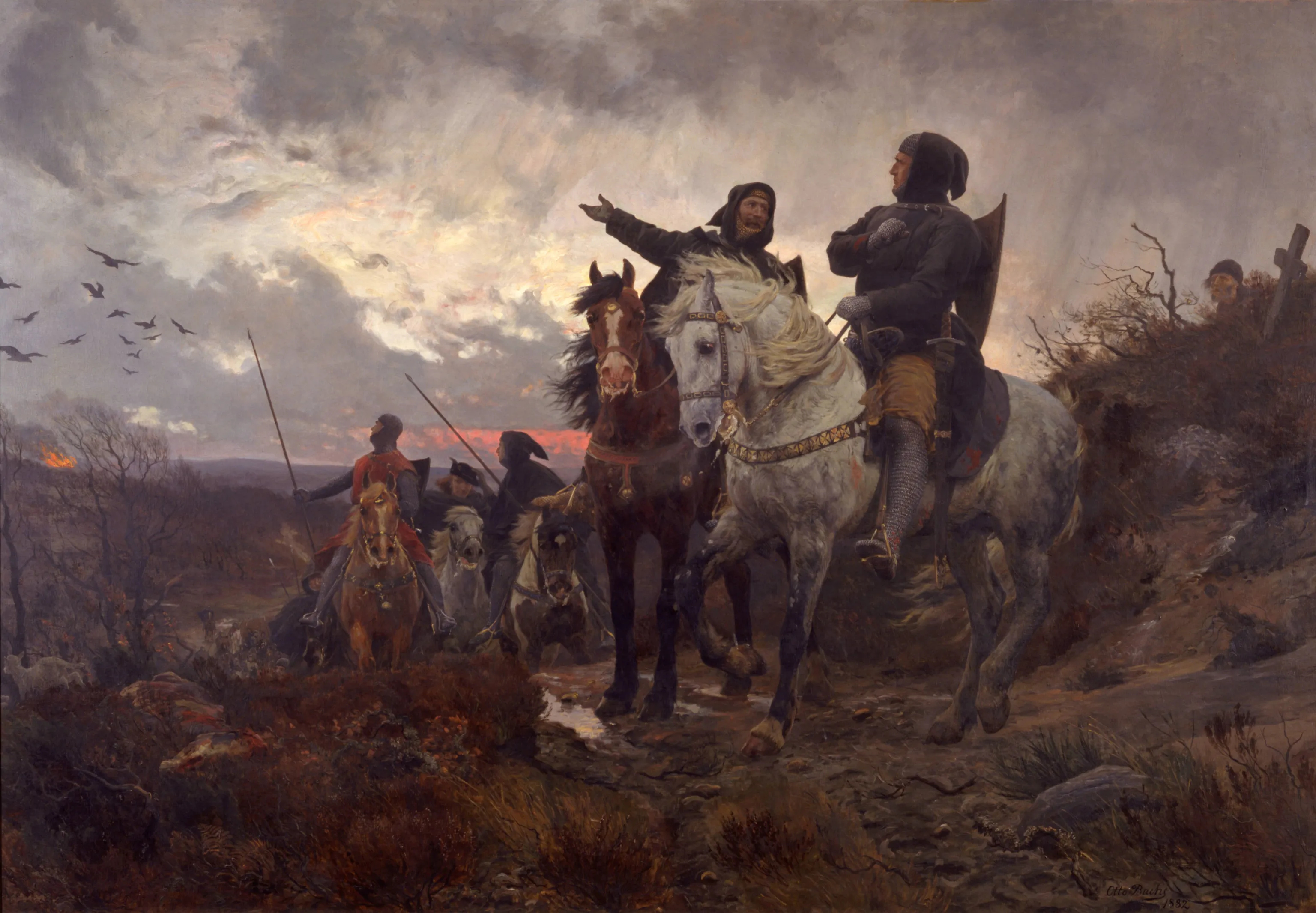
"The conspirators ride from Finderup after the murder of Eric Klipping St. Cecilia Night 1286". Painted by Otto Bache, 1882.

Legend has it that several nobles swore an oath that they would murder Eric in revenge for personal slights or policies the king enforced that they did not like. Chief among the conspirators was marshal (Danish: marsk) Stig Andersen Hvide and Jacob Nielsen, Count of Halland. They paid Rane Jonsen (1254–1294) one of the king's companions, to keep them informed as to the king's activities, in order to fulfill their oath.

November 1286 found the king at Viborg, in central Jutland. After a long day's hunt in the countryside led by Rane Jonsen, the king and a few attendants could not find their way back to the king's farm at Viborg. Rane suggested that they take shelter for the night of 22 November 1286 in the church barn in the village of Finderup (Finderup Lade). The assassins, dressed as Franciscan friars, were kept informed as to the king's whereabouts and waited for everyone to settle down for the night. Once the king fell asleep, they rushed from their hiding places and stabbed and hacked the king to death.

Tradition has it that he received 56 stab wounds. The folktale that grew up around this event has Stig Andersen personally striking the first blows in revenge for King Eric's seduction of Stig's wife, while Stig himself was off serving with the king's army. Eric's bloody corpse was discovered the next morning.

The court immediately blamed the nation's most powerful noblemen Stig Andersen Hvide and Count Jacob of Halland and outlawed them and seven others. Only one was accused of killing the king, the others were accused of involvement. Whether they actually had anything to do with the murder remains a mystery. Stig Hvide fled the country to take up piracy. Certainly, Stig Hvide was not the only person who had a reason to want to see King Eric eliminated. Valdemar IV, who King Eric was forced to accept as Duke of Schleswig in 1283, as well as many of Archbishop Jakob Erlandsen's appointments to bishoprics, remained bitter enemies of the king until his death. These banished nobles had also raided the Danish countryside for 20 years with the support of Haakon V of Norway.

== Issue ==
King Eric V married Agnes of Brandenburg (c. 1257–1304) on 11 November 1273 at Schleswig. She was the daughter of John I, Margrave of Brandenburg (d. 1266) and Brigitte of Saxony. The marriage was probably agreed upon during King Eric's captivity in Brandenburg by Agnes' father from 1262 to 1264. Tradition claims that the King was released from captivity on his promise to marry Agnes without a dowry.

They had the following issue:

- Richeza (c. 1272 – 27 October 1308), married Lord Nicholas II of Werle
- Eric VI (1274–1319)
- Christopher II (1276–1332)
- Martha (1278–1341), married King Birger of Sweden
- Katharine (c. 1281 – 1283), died young
- Valdemar
- Elisabeth

Eric Klipping House of Estridsen Born: 1249 Died: 22 November 1286
Regnal titles
Preceded by Christopher I	King of Denmark; 1259–1286	Succeeded by Eric Menved
