= Valdemar III of Schleswig =

Valdemar III Abelsøn (died 1257) was Duke of Schleswig from 1253 until his death in 1257. He was the eldest son of King Abel of Denmark, Duke of Schleswig and Matilda of Holstein.

== Life ==
At the time of his father's death in 1252, Valdemar was being held prisoner in the Archbishopric of Cologne, the hostage of the Prince-Archbishop. Thus unable to claim the throne of Denmark, his father's younger brother Christopher I was elected king.

However, his mother's relatives, the counts of Holstein were able to obtain his release and supported his claim to the Duchy of Schleswig. In 1253 Christopher I had to relinquish his opposition and created him Duke.

The following years Valdemar spent fighting his uncle, King Christopher. Valdemar died in 1257. He was succeeded as duke by his younger brother, Eric I.

== Ancestry ==
Ancestors of Valdemar III of Schleswig

16. Canute Lavard
8. Valdemar I of Denmark
17. Ingeborg of Kiev
4. Valdemar II of Denmark
18. Volodar, Prince of Minsk and Hrodno
9. Sophia of Minsk
19. Richeza of Poland
2. Abel of Denmark
20. Afonso I of Portugal
10. Sancho I of Portugal
21. Maud of Savoy
5. Berengaria of Portugal
22. Ramon Berenguer IV, Count of Barcelona
11. Dulce of Aragon
23. Petronila of Aragon
1. Valdemar III, Duke of Schleswig
24. Adolf II, Count of Holstein
12. Adolf III, Count of Holstein
25. Matilda of Schwarzburg
6. Adolf IV, Count of Holstein
26. Burchard III of Querfurt, Burgrave of Magdeburg; as Burchard II of Magdeburg
13. Adelheid of Querfurt
27. Matilda of Gleichen
3. Matilda of Holstein
28. Bernhard II, Lord of Lippe
14. Hermann II, Lord of Lippe
29. Heilwig of Are-Hostaden
7. Heilwig of Lippe
30. Simon, Count of Tecklenburg
15. Oda of Tecklenburg
31. Oda of Berg-Altena

Valdemar III, Duke of Schleswig House of Estridsen Died: 9 August 1257
Regnal titles
Preceded by Abel	Duke of Schleswig; 1253–1257	Succeeded by Eric I
