= Jakob Erlandsen =

Danish archbishop

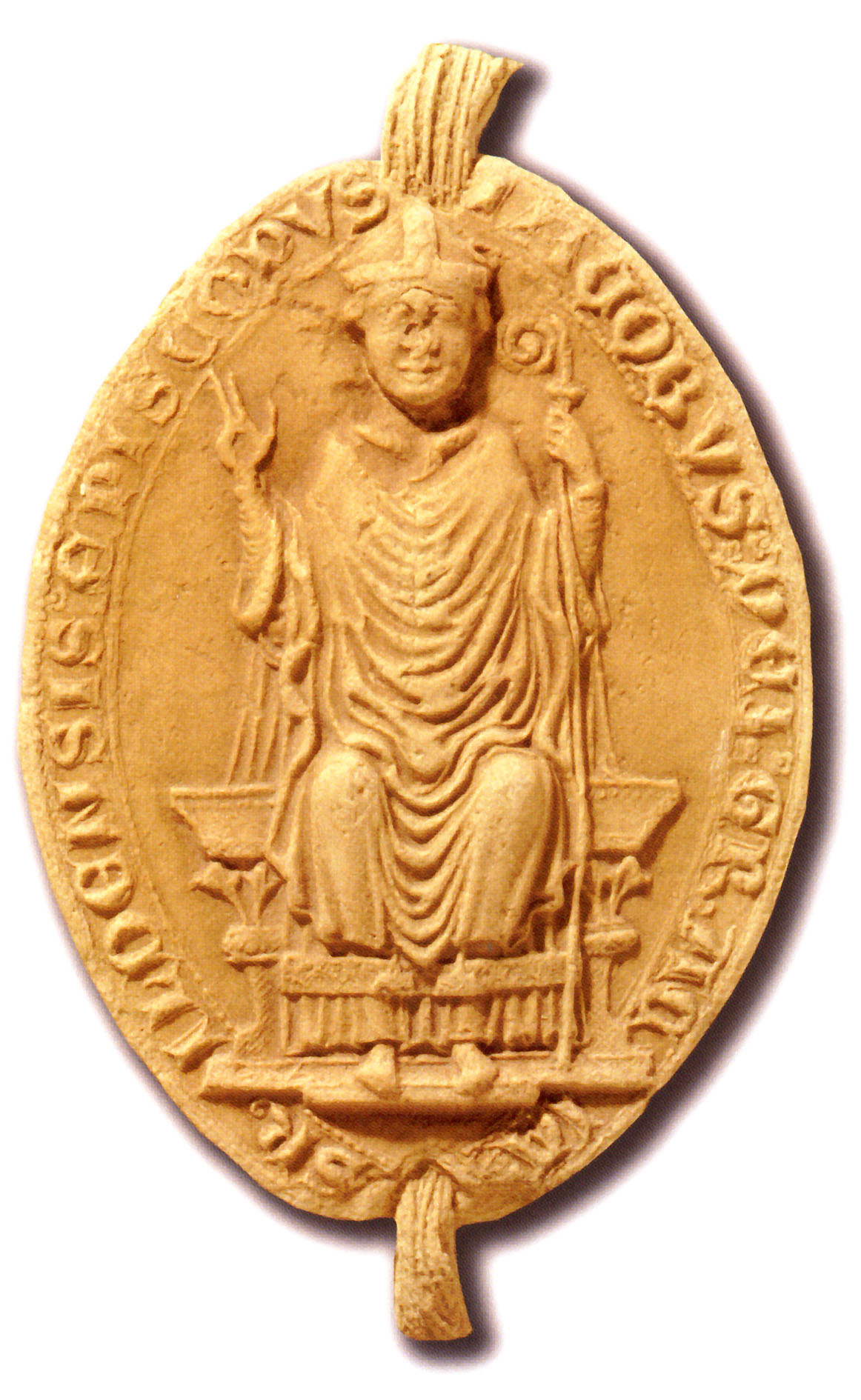
Jacob Erlandsen

Jakob Erlandsen (died 18 February 1274) was a Danish Archbishop of Lund (1254–1274) and the central character of the first great church conflict in Denmark.

== History ==
Belonging to a wealthy magnate family (Galen clan) that was related to Archbishop Absalon Erlandsen and all others of Hvide clan, he became a clergyman. He was educated in Paris and showed a solid juridical knowledge at visits in Rome. From the start he seems to have represented a stand of opposition towards the royal power and as bishop of Roskilde (from 1250) he was at odds with King Eric IV. His zeal seems to have been a de facto independence of the church in relation to the king and the state power. In many ways this was in accordance with international canonical law and in agreement with the offensive course of the papal policy but in Denmark it was relatively unknown; here king and bishops normally had worked together, the latter recognising the upper hand of the king.

In 1254 bishop Jakob was appointed archbishop and by this his real struggle with the king began. King Christopher I strongly resisted the archbishop's wish of adjusting the legislation and juridical right of the Danish church with international canonical law because it meant a severe hampering of the state power, among other things of its financial energy. Furthermore, this might very well make the archbishop the independent ruler of his diocese Scania. After many minor conflicts, archbishop Jakob in 1256 issued the so-called Vejle Constitution, a law that was meant to secure all bishops against any kind of arrest from the king's side by threatening him with an interdict. This law was an open challenge to the king and was far from being supported by all bishops. During the next years Jakob Erlandsen and King Christopher more and more came on collision course and when the archbishop in a critical situation refused to accept the king's son Eric (Eric V) as crown prince he was arrested and imprisoned in 1259.

The arrest only partly provoked the expected interdict, but military attacks from the bishop's foreign allies and the king's sudden death weakened the royal party. The same year Jakob Erlandsen was released by the Queen Dowager Margrethe Sambiria, his distant cousin. His new political initiatives against the king however made any reconciliation impossible and in 1263 he fled to Northern Germany. From then the case continued at the papal court in Rome.

Jakob spent most of his last ten years in Italy keen on getting satisfaction. He had to handle alternating popes of changing points of view at the same time as he counteracted the Danish government. Denmark was put under interdict and the royal family was excommunicated but it did not yield to the papal verdicts, nor did Jakob get much support from his own church. At last a compromise was reached in 1272 by which the archbishop obtained some concessions. He travelled home in order to get a final solution, but on the way he died on the island of Rügen. Modern examinations of his skeleton indicate that he might have been assassinated but nothing is sure. After his death King Eric quite simply cancelled all royal concessions.

Jakob Erlandsen's career and defeat shows the great difficulties of carrying through international ecclesiastical legislation in Denmark. The demands of papal supremacy and the authority of the church collided with the traditional Danish view of the division of power. What the archbishop regarded justified demands of clerical immunity and independence meant disloyalty and treason to the king. More interesting is it that much of the population and even many clergymen seem to have shared the royal opinions. Apart from this Jakob Erlandsen's style, his alliances with the foreign enemies of the crown and his intense conduct also seem to have repulsed many possible supporters.

His fight was taken up again by his kinsman Jens Grand.
