= Christopher I of Denmark =

King of Denmark from 1252 to 1259

Christopher I
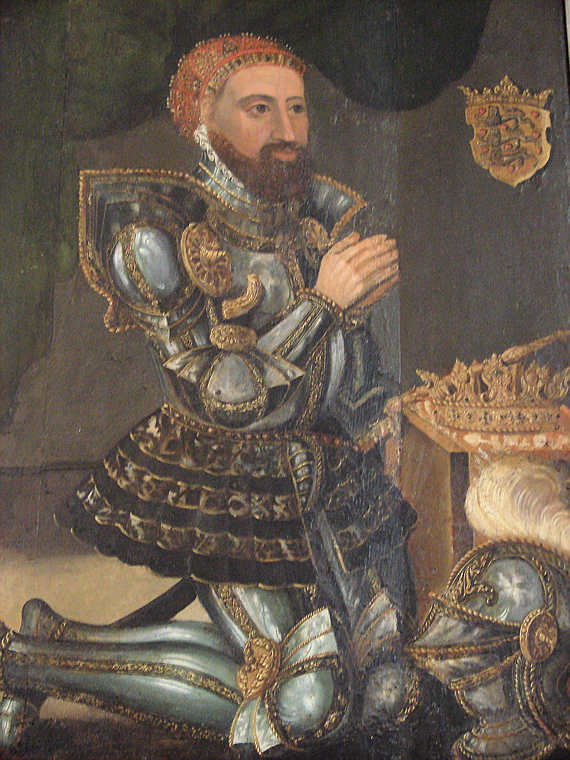
- Imaginary portrait, c. 1575

King of Denmark and the Wends
- Reign: 1252–1259
- Coronation: 25 December 1252
- Predecessor: Abel
- Successor: Eric V Klipping
- Born: 1219
- Died: 29 May 1259 (aged 39–40); Ribe
- Burial: Ribe Cathedral
- Spouse: Margaret Sambiria
- Issue among others...: Eric V Klipping
Names
- Christopher Valdemarsen
- House: Estridsen
- Father: Valdemar II of Denmark
- Mother: Berengaria of Portugal

Christopher I (Danish: Christoffer 1.; 1219 – 29 May 1259) was King of Denmark between 1252 and 1259. He was the son of Valdemar II of Denmark by his second wife, Berengaria of Portugal. He succeeded his brothers Eric IV Plovpenning and Abel of Denmark on the throne. Christopher was elected king upon the death of his older brother Abel in the summer of 1252. He was crowned at Lund Cathedral on Christmas Day 1252.

== King of Denmark ==
Christopher began organizing the effort to have his brother Erik IV Plovpenning canonized, laying his murder directly at the feet of his other brother Abel of Denmark. If recognized by the pope, the murder would exclude Abel's sons from the succession and guarantee Christopher's own sons Denmark's crown. This meant that Christopher as a younger son tried to keep the sons of his older brothers from ruling Denmark, which went against prevailing customs.

The king spent most of his reign fighting his many opponents. By allowing Abel's son, Valdemar Abelsøn, to be Duke of Schleswig he prevented an all-out civil war, but became the target of intrigue and treachery. Southern Jutland including Schleswig and Holstein were independent from the king's rule for a time. Christopher also gained a ferocious enemy in the newly named Archbishop of Lund, Jacob Erlandsen, who was closely connected with Abel's family. Erlandsen asserted his rights often at odds with the king. King Christopher insisted that the church pay taxes like any other land owner. Bishop Jacob refused and went so far as to forbid peasants who lived or worked on church properties to give military service to King Christopher. Erlandsen was perhaps the wealthiest man in the kingdom and insisted that the secular government have no control or hold over the church, its property, or ecclesiastical personnel. He simply excommunicated the king to show that he wasn't about to surrender to the king's will.

After an incursion into Halland by Haakon IV of Norway, in 1256, Christopher was reconciled with the kings of Norway and Sweden which had been provoked by Abel's interventions. There were peasant uprisings against King Christopher the same year and again in 1258 as a result of Christopher's new property tax. Archbishop Jacob refused to recognize Christopher's young son, Eric, as Denmark's rightful heir in 1257 and threatened excommunication against any bishop who anointed the prince as king of Denmark. That was the last straw. He ordered Bishop Erlandsen's own brother to arrest the troublesome archbishop. Christopher humiliated the proud and powerful Archbishop Jakob by forcing him to wear secular clothing and a fool's cap with a fox tail attached. The archbishop was paraded through the country to Hagenskov near Assens where he was chained and cast into prison. Erlandsen had ordered at a Vejle church council that if he was imprisoned that the bishops were to declare interdict against the whole country, but none of them did. Bishop of Roskilde Peder Bang fled to Rügen and convinced Chief Jaromar II to invade Zealand.

Christopher tried to have his brother Eric IV canonized, but without Archbishop Jacobs' support it came to naught. When Duke Valdemar died, King Christopher tried to prevent Valdemar's brother, Eric Abelsøn, from taking the duke's place. Valdemar's widow encouraged a few counts of northern Germany to rebel. In the confusion, Christopher fled to Southern Jutland to stay with the Bishop of Ribe.

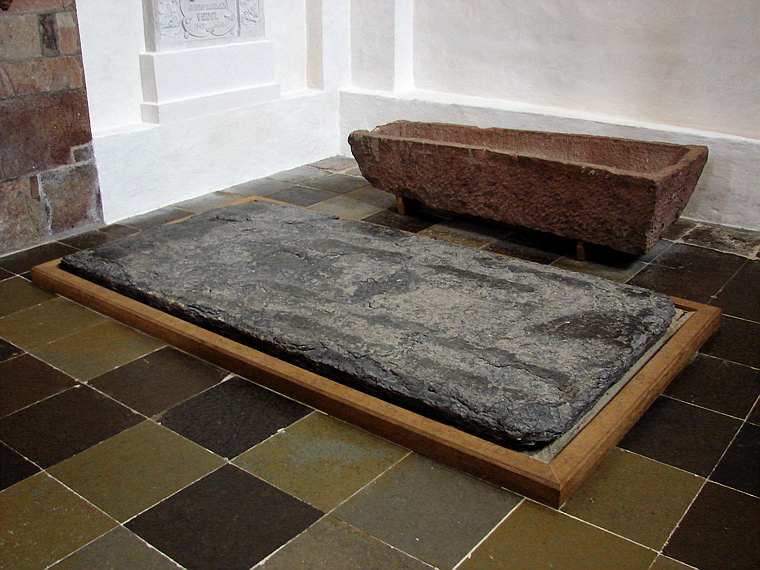
Christopher I's tomb at Ribe Cathedral.

The King died unexpectedly after taking Holy Communion. According to contemporary sources, King Christopher died after drinking poisoned communion wine from the hands of abbot Arnfast of Ryd Abbey in revenge for his mistreatment of Archbishop Erlendsen and the king's oppression of the church. King Christopher's excommunication had no effect, and he was buried in front of the high altar of Ribe Cathedral immediately after his death on 29 May 1259. The king may have died of natural causes; Christopher's allies, however, called him Krist-Offer ("Christ's sacrifice"). Christopher was succeeded by his son Eric, as Eric V of Denmark.

== Legacy ==
The Danehof became an institution during his rule. It functioned like a national council which had limited advisory and judicial functions.

Christopher married Margaret Sambiria, the daughter of Count Sambor II of Pomerania, in 1248 and had at least three children:

- King Eric V of Denmark (1249–1286)
- Niels (d. 21 December 1259), died young
- Valdemar, died young
- Matilda (1250–1299/1300), married to Albert III, Margrave of Brandenburg-Salzwedel
- Margaret (c. 1257–1306), married to John II, Count of Holstein-Kiel

Christopher I of Denmark House of Estridsen Born: 1219 Died: 29 May 1259
Regnal titles
| Preceded by Abel | King of Denmark; Duke of Estonia; 1252–1259 | Succeeded by Eric Klipping |
