= Richardis of Schwerin, Duchess of Schleswig =

Richardis of Schwerin

Duchess consort of Schleswig
- Tenure: 13??–1364
- Died: before 1386
- Spouse: Valdemar III of Denmark
- Issue: Valdemar, Hereditary Prince of Schleswig; Henry, Duke of Schleswig
- House: Hagen
- Father: Gunzelin VI, Count of Schwerin-Wittenburg
- Mother: Richardis of Tecklenburg
- Religion: Roman Catholicism

Richardis of Schwerin, also called Richardis of Lauenburg or Rixa, (year unknown – before 1386), was a Duchess consort of Schleswig and possibly a Danish queen consort, married to Valdemar III of Denmark (Valdemar V, Duke of Schleswig). She was the daughter of Gunzelin VI, Count of Schwerin-Wittenburg and Richardis of Tecklenburg. She was the aunt of Richardis of Schwerin, Queen of Sweden.

The year of her marriage is unknown; her spouse was king of Denmark in 1326–29, and if she married him before 1329, she would have been queen of Denmark. They had two sons, Valdemar (1338–1360) and Henry (1342–1375), the latter, Henry, succeeded in Schleswig upon Valdemar's death. Richardis is mainly known for an incident in 1358, during the war between her spouse and king Valdemar Atterdag of Denmark. Atterdag made a siege on Sønderborg castle on Als, which was at the time the residence of Richardis. She defended the castle successfully for a long time, but when it was no longer possible, she opened the gates and walked out to the king with her daughters and all the women of the castle "in an attempt to beg the victorious master for mercy". This succeeded, and Atterdag agreed to leave her in control of the castle, on condition that she stay out of the war. In 1364, her son made peace with Atterdag. In 1373, Richardis made Atterdag the protector of her widow fiefs, including Als. This is the last time she is mentioned; in 1386, her nephew Otto VI, Count of Tecklenburg gave permission to her nephew Eric of Saxony to claim Otto's inheritance after Richardis in his name.

== Ancestry ==
Ancestors of Richardis of Schwerin, Duchess of Schleswig

8. Gunzelin III, Count of Schwerin
4. Niklot I, Count of Schwerin-Wittenburg
9. Margaret of Mecklenburg
2. Gunzelin VI, Count of Schwerin-Wittenburg
10. John I, Count of Holstein-Kiel
5. Elisabeth of Holstein-Kiel
11. Elisabeth of Saxony
1. Richardis of Schwerin
12. Otto III, Count of Tecklenburg
6. Otto IV, Count of Tecklenburg
13. Richardis of the Mark
3. Richardis of Tecklenburg
14. Frederick I, Count of Rietberg
7. Beatrice of Rietberg
15. Beatrice of Horstmar

Richardis of Schwerin, Duchess of Schleswig House of Hagen
Royal titles
Preceded by Sophia of Mecklenburg-Werle	Duchess consort of Schleswig; 13??–1364	Succeeded by Kunigunde
Preceded by Euphemia of Pomerania	possible Queen consort of Denmark ?-?	Succeeded by Euphemia of Pomerania
