= Mechtilde of Holstein =

Queen of Denmark from 1250 to 1252

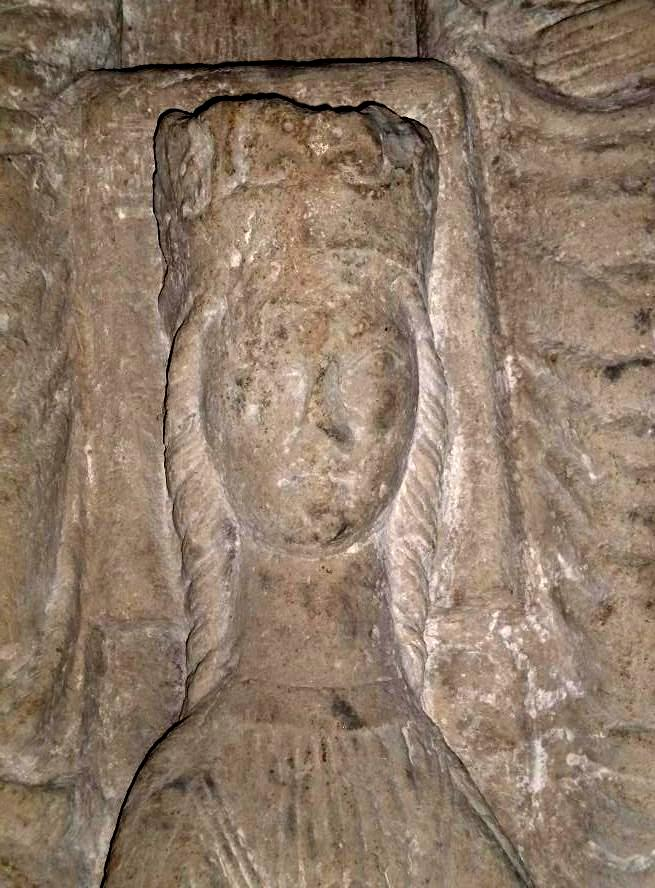

Queen consort of Denmark
- Tenure: 1250–1252
- Coronation: 1 November 1250
- Born: c. 1218
- Died: 1288; Kiel
- Burial: Varnhem Abbey
- Spouse: Abel, King of Denmark; Birger Jarl
- Issue Detail: Valdemar III, Duke of Schleswig; Sophie, Princess of Anhalt-Bernburg; Eric I, Duke of Schleswig; Abel, Lord of Langeland
- House: Schauenburg
- Father: Adolf IV, Count of Holstein
- Mother: Heilwig of Lippe

Mechtilde of Holstein (Note: Also spelled Mathilde, Mechtild or Matilda) (c. 1218 – 1288) was a Danish queen consort, married to King Abel of Denmark and later to Birger Jarl, Regent of Sweden.

== Life ==
Mechtilde was born around 1218, likely in Schauenburg Castle. She was the daughter of Adolf IV, Count of Schauenburg and Heilwig of Lippe. Her grandfather Adolf III had lost the County of Holstein to Danish King Valdemar Sejr in 1203, but her father regained it during her childhood after the German nobles defeated Valdemar in the Battle of Bornhöved in 1227. On 25 April 1237 she was married to Duke Abel of Schleswig, King Valdemar's second eldest son, as part of a settlement between the two houses.

When Abel became King of Denmark in 1250, she was crowned with him in Roskilde on 1 November. Abel died two years later in 1252, and was succeeded by his brother Christopher rather than her son Valdemar, who was imprisoned by the Archbishop of Cologne at the time.

She successfully secured Valdemar's release from Cologne and fought for her children's inheritance in the Duchy of Schleswig. In 1253, she secured Schleswig for Valdemar. After his death in 1257, she arranged for her next son, Eric, to take over the Duchy in 1260.

She made a pact with Jacob Erlandsen, archbishop of Lund, and then broke her vows from the convent by marrying the Swedish regent Birger Jarl in 1261. Birger had been one of her late husband Abel's major antagonists who had started a military vendetta against him which was only stopped by Abel's death. After Birger's death in 1266, Mechtilde moved to Kiel, yet her own grave is with Birger's in Varnhem, Sweden.

In 1260, she had pawned the land between Eider and Schlei in southern Denmark to her brothers. After the deaths of her sons in 1272 and 1279, she inherited the land. Shortly before her death in 1288, she transferred the land to her brother, Count Gerhard of Holstein. This caused much resentment in Denmark, where she was labeled the "daughter of the Devil" and accused of destroying letters from the Pope and emperor to King Valdemar.

== Issue ==
Queen Mechtilde bore her first husband three sons and one daughter who reached adulthood:

- Valdemar III (1238–1257); Duke of Schleswig from 1254 to 1257
- Sophie (c. 1240 – c. 1284), married Bernhard I, Prince of Anhalt-Bernburg
- Eric I (c. 1241 – 27 May 1272); Duke of Schleswig from 1260 to 1272
- Abel (1252–1279); born after his father's death, held several fiefs in Southern Denmark
- Unnamed daughter, died young

== Notes ==
Mechtilde of Holstein House of Schauenburg Born: 1220s Died: 1288
Danish royalty
Preceded by Jutta of Saxony	Queen consort of Denmark; 1250–1252	Succeeded by Margaret Sambiria
