= Eric I of Schleswig =

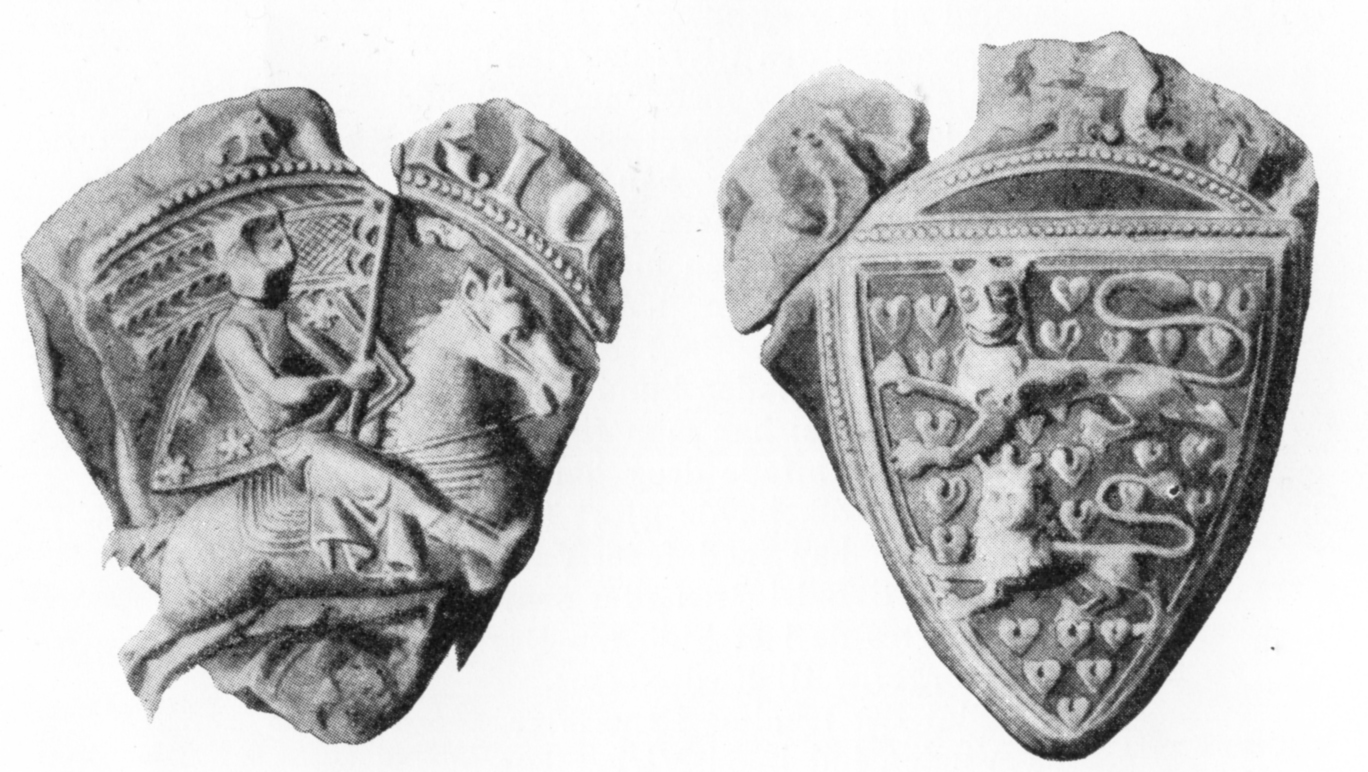
The seal of Eric I, the first known example of the coat of arms of Schleswig.

Eric I Abelsøn (Danish: Erik 1. Abelsøn af Danmark) (c. 1241 – 27 May 1272) was a Danish nobleman. He was the ruling Duke of Schleswig from 1260 until his death in 1272. He was the second son of King Abel of Denmark, Duke of Schleswig and Mechtild of Holstein.

== Early life ==
Eric was born in c. 1241. After the death of his elder brother Duke Valdemar III in 1257, Eric inherited the claim to the Duchy of Schleswig. However, his uncle and potential feudal overlord King Christopher I of Denmark refused to install him as duke.

Subsequently, Eric participated in the coalition of Bishop Peder Bang of Roskilde and Prince Jaromar II of Rugia against King Christopher. He took part in the military campaign of 1259 which resulted in the conquest of Copenhagen.

== Duke of Schleswig ==
After the death of Christopher in 1259, he was granted Schleswig by the Queen Dowager Margaret Sambiria in 1260.

Already the following year, fighting with the king broke out anew. The Queen Dowager, acting as regent for her underage son Eric V, feared aggression from the Duke. However, Duke Eric was able to defeat the royal army at the Battle of Lohede and capture the young King Eric and his mother. As a result, he was able to obtain huge advantages for his duchy at the subsequent treaty in 1264.

In 1268, he acquired Gottorp Castle from Bishop Bonde of Schleswig, who then moved his residence to Schwabstedt.

Duke Eric died 27 May 1272.

== Marriage and issue ==
Eric married Margaret of Rugia, a daughter of Jaromar II, Prince of Rugia in 1259. They had the following children:

- Margaret (died after 1313), married Helmold III, Count of Schwerin
- Valdemar IV, Duke of Schleswig (c. 1265–1312)
- Eric (Longbone), from 1295 Lord of Langeland (1272–1310), married Sophia Burghardsdatter (died 1325), daughter of Queen dowager Jutta of Denmark and Count Burchard VIII of Querfurt-Rosenburg, Burgrave of Magdeburg

Eric I, Duke of Schleswig House of Estridsen Born: ca. 1242 Died: 27 May 1272
Regnal titles
Preceded by Valdemar III	Duke of Schleswig; 1260–1272	Succeeded by Valdemar IV
