= Abel, King of Denmark =

King of Denmark from 1250 to 1252

Abel
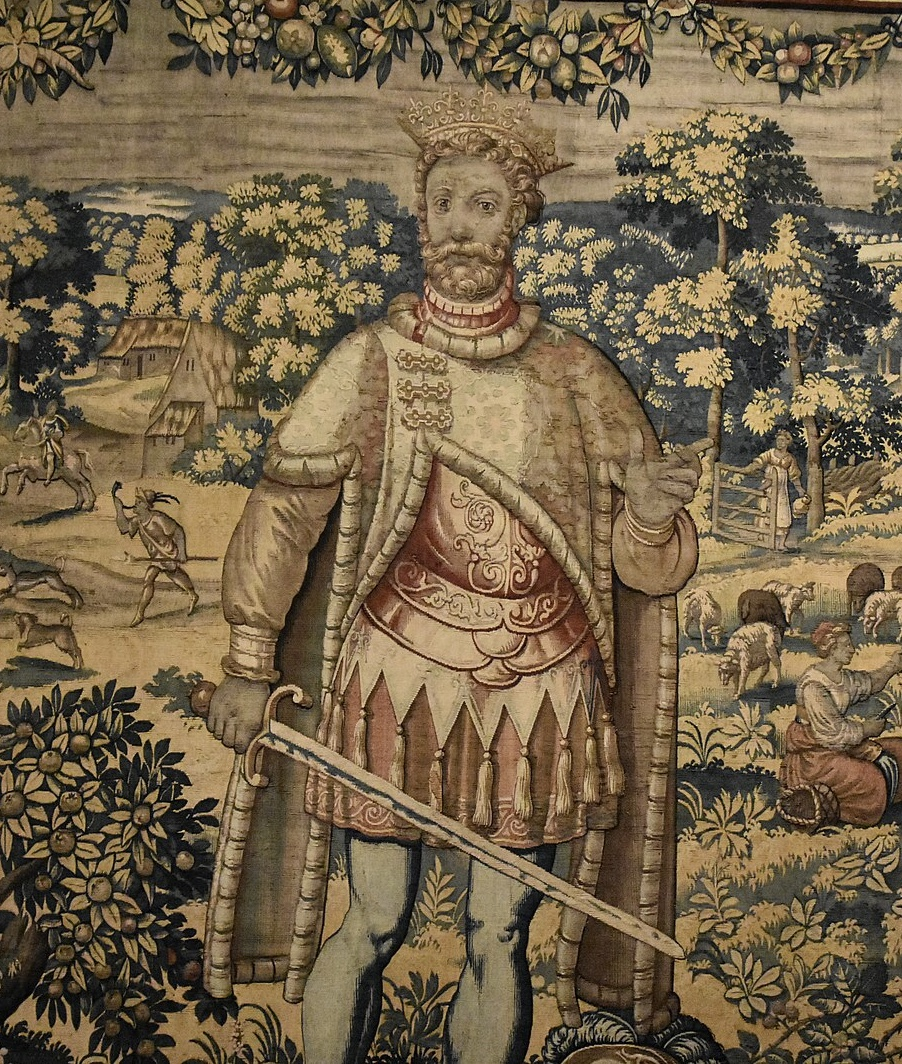
- Abel depicted on the Kronborg Tapestries at Kronborg Castle

King of Denmark and the Wends
- Reign: 1 November 1250 – 29 June 1252
- Coronation: 1 November 1250
- Predecessor: Eric IV
- Successor: Christopher I
- Born: 1218
- Died: 29 June 1252 (aged 33–34); Eiderstedt, Schleswig
- Burial: Schleswig Cathedral, moved to Gottorf Castle
- Spouse: Matilda of Holstein
- Issue Detail: Valdemar III, Duke of Schleswig; Sophie, Princess of Anhalt-Bernburg; Eric I, Duke of Schleswig; Abel, Lord of Langeland
- House: Estridsen
- Father: Valdemar II of Denmark
- Mother: Berengaria of Portugal

Abel Valdemarsen (c. 1218 – 29 June 1252) was Duke of Schleswig from 1232 to 1252 and King of Denmark from 1250 until his death in 1252. He was the son of Valdemar II and his second wife, Berengaria of Portugal, and brother of kings Eric IV and Christopher I.

As Duke of Schleswig, Abel came into conflict with his brother, King Eric IV, whose murder in 1250 was suspected of orchestrating. Upon taking an oath to clear himself of the allegations, he was elected king. After a short reign, he was killed during a military expedition in Frisia.

Abel's reign was the shortest of any Danish monarch since the 9th century. He founded a line of dukes of Schleswig - the "Abel family" - which ruled the Duchy of Schleswig until 1375.

== Early life ==
In 1232, at the election of his elder brother Eric as co-ruler and heir of their father, King Valdemar II, Abel was chosen to succeed Eric in his position as Duke of Schleswig.

In 1237, he married Matilda of Holstein, daughter of Adolf IV of Holstein (1205-1261). As Count Adolf withdrew to a Franciscan friary the same year, Abel spent several years acting as regent for his under age brothers-in-law, John I of Holstein-Kiel (1229–1263) and Gerhard I, Count of Holstein-Itzehoe (1232–1290).

== Duke of Schleswig ==
In early 1241, Abel took part in the 1240–1241 Votia campaign against the Novgorod Republic and Finnic pagans, yet was to suspend the campaign on the death of his father, Valdemar II.

At the death of Valdemar II in 1241, Duke Abel's brother Eric acceded to the throne of Denmark as Eric IV. In the following years, Duke Abel fought against his brother, trying to gain independence for the Duchy of Schleswig. He raided north as far as Randers, ravaging Eric's supporters, and then moved into Funen. Eric struck back a year later, surprising Abel's garrison at Schleswig, forcing Abel's young daughter Sophie to flee "without so much as a pair of shoes for her feet."

The fighting continued until Abel's sister Sophie of Denmark (c. 1217–1247), wife of John I, Margrave of Brandenburg (c. 1213–1266), brokered a truce between Duke Abel and King Eric that held until 1250 when Eric was murdered while a guest at Duke Abel's residence at Schleswig.

== King ==
Eric IV was slain by Abel's chamberlain, Lage Gudmundsen (ca. 1195–1252), and others; the king's headless body dumped into the Schlei. Even though Abel and twenty-four noblemen swore an official oath ("dual dozen's oath", in Danish "dobbelt tylvter-ed") that the Duke had no part in the killing, it was widely believed that King Eric was murdered at his brother's bidding. "Abel by name, Cain by his deeds" (Danish, "Abel af navn, Kain af gavn"), or so people said.

== Death ==
After clearing himself of the allegations taking the oath, Abel was proclaimed King of Denmark at the Viborg Assembly (Danish: landsting) on 1 November 1250. Abel only ruled for a year and a half. King Abel received word that the peasants in Frisia, led by Sicko Sjaerdema of Friesland, refused to pay the tax levy. Abel raised an army to punish them. At 33, he was killed by a wheelwright named Henner on Husum Bridge near Eiderstedt on 29 June 1252.

At the time, Abel's half-grown son Valdemar (1238–1257) was held for ransom by the Archbishop of Cologne. So, Abel's youngest brother Christopher I was crowned King on Christmas Day 1252 in Lund Cathedral.

After Abel's death, Queen Matilda entered a convent but subsequently bypassed her vows there to marry Swedish statesman Birger Jarl in 1261. Birger was an enemy of Abel's, and not long before Abel's death, Birger had started up a military vendetta against him which was only called off when the Danish king died.

== Legacy ==
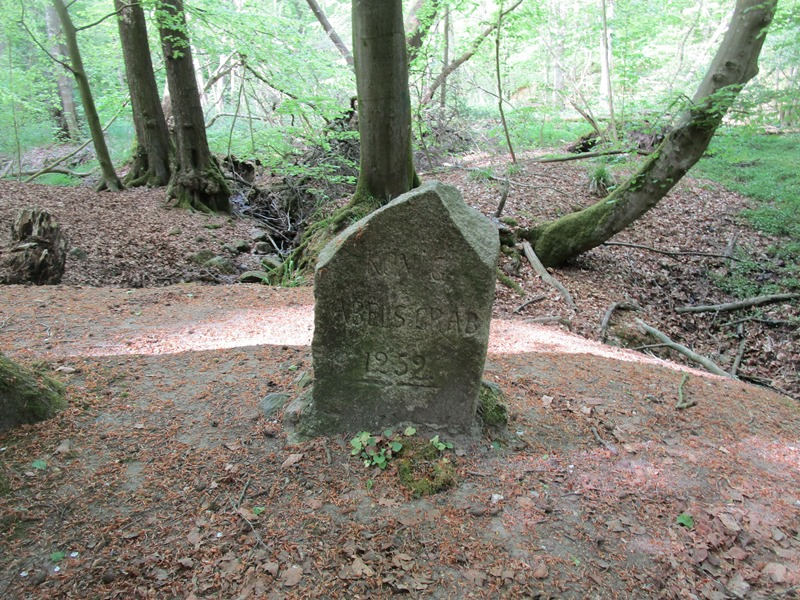
Memorial with Abel's death year in a forest (German: Tiergarten, Danisch: Dyrehave) outside Schleswig

Most people at the time viewed Abel's sudden death as God's judgment on him for the murder of his brother. As Abel's body lay in Schleswig Cathedral, the monks heard strange sounds in the church at night. They said they were too afraid to go into the church after that. They believed that Abel's unholy ghost walked abroad at night. Consequently, the king's body was taken outside the church and stuffed into a soggy grave near Gottorp Castle outside Schleswig. Someone rammed a wooden stake through Abel's chest to make sure he remained in his grave. It was said long after that the king's ghost found no peace, and from time to time, there were reports of "Abel's wild hunt" where a black-faced man on a white horse and glowing hounds hunted across the moors and forest of Schleswig.

Abel's descendants — the "Abel Family" — ruled South Jutland until 1375, often in co-operation with their relatives in Holstein. They created a permanent problem for the Danish government. Their rule meant the eventual separation of Frisia, Holstein, and most of Schleswig from the rest of Denmark. His great-grandson succeeded briefly as Valdemar III before being deposed. However, Abel's descendants would return to the throne with his great-granddaughter Helvig of Schleswig, who married Valdemar IV. Even though the line of Helvig died out with Christopher III, his successor Christian I was a descendant of Abel's through his daughter Sophie. Except for Christopher I through Valdemar IV, all subsequent Danish monarchs have been Abel's cognatic descendants.

== Marriage and issue ==
With his wife, Matilda of Holstein (ca. 1220 or 1225 – 1288) whom he married on 25 April 1237, they had four children;

- Valdemar III (1238–1257); Duke of Schleswig 1254–1257
- Sophie (born 1240, d. aft. 1284), married Bernhard I, Prince of Anhalt-Bernburg. Their descendant was Christian I of Denmark.
- Eric I (c. 1241 – 27 May 1272); Duke of Schleswig 1260–1272
- Abel (1252–1279); born after his father's death, held several fiefs in Southern Denmark

Abel, King of Denmark House of Estridsen Born: 1218 Died: 29 June 1252
Regnal titles
Preceded by Eric Plough-tax	Duke of Schleswig; 1232–1252	Succeeded by Valdemar III
Preceded by Eric Plough-tax	King of Denmark; Duke of Estonia; 1250–1252	Succeeded by Christopher I
