= Berengaria of Portugal =

Queen of Denmark from 1214 to 1221

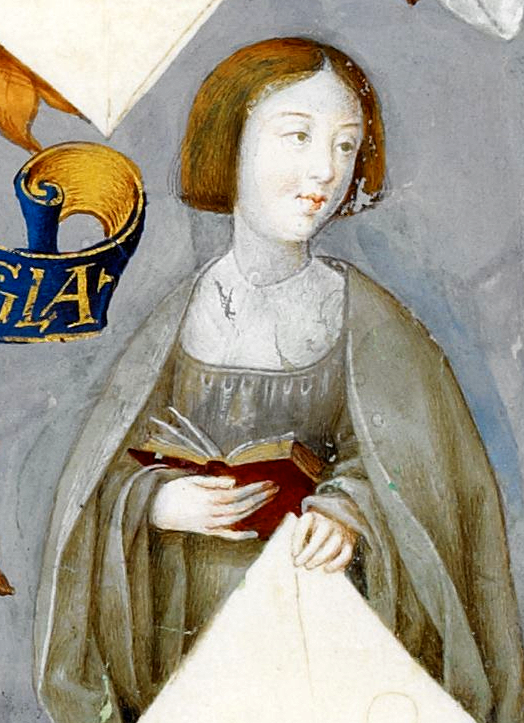
- Berengaria in Genealogia dos Reis de Portugal by António de Hollanda (c. 1530–34)

Queen consort of Denmark
- Tenure: 1214–1221
- Born: c. 1198
- Died: 27 March 1221 (aged 22–23); Ringsted, Denmark
- Burial: St. Bendt's Church
- Spouse: Valdemar II of Denmark
- Issue: Eric IV, King of Denmark; Sophia, Margravine of Brandenburg; Abel, King of Denmark; Christopher I, King of Denmark
- House: Portuguese House of Burgundy
- Father: Sancho I of Portugal
- Mother: Dulce of Aragon

Berengaria of Portugal (Portuguese: Berengária, Danish: Bengjerd; c. 1198 – 27 March 1221) was a Portuguese infanta (princess), who became Queen of Denmark, as the second wife of Valdemar II, from 1214 until her death.

Born into the Portuguese House of Burgundy, she was the daughter of King Sancho I of Portugal and Dulce of Aragon. Likely the youngest of her siblings, she may have been the twin of Branca, and their mother died shortly after their birth. Following the death of her father in 1211, Berengaria became an orphan, and her brother, now King Afonso II, soon sought to curtail his siblings' bequeathed estates. In the ensuing conflicts, Berengaria was initially entrusted to the care of her elder sister Theresa, formerly Queen of León, then a nun at the convent of Lorvão in Penacova. Another brother Ferdinand fled to France, becoming Count of Flanders in 1212, and Berengaria seems to have followed him there or to the court of his overlord, Philip II of France, a cousin of theirs. Seeking to consolidate an anti-French North Sea alliance with King John of England, Emperor Otto IV and others, Ferdinand arranged her marriage to Valdemar II of Denmark, likely facilitated through Valdemar’s sister Ingeborg, the estranged queen of Philip II. The later marriage of Berengaria’s niece Eleanor of Portugal to Valdemar’s eldest son, Valdemar the Young, in 1229 further tightened the dynastic links between the Portuguese and Danish royal houses.

In May 1214, she married Valdemar II "the Victorious" as his second wife, his first consort, Dagmar of Bohemia, having died in childbirth in 1212. Exceedingly little is recorded of her queenship, although she was described as "exceptionally beautiful", and made several donations to churches and monasteries. She is also the earliest Danish queen known to have worn a crown. Her children with Valdemar included the future Danish kings Eric IV, Abel and Christopher I, as well as a daughter, Sophie, who married John I, Margrave of Brandenburg. Berengaria died in 1221 in her early twenties, probably in childbirth, and was buried in St. Bendt's Church, Ringsted.

In later Danish ballads and chronicles, recorded from the sixteenth century, she appears under the name “Bengerd” as the hard and selfish counterpart to her idealised predecessor Queen Dagmar, and early narrative historians often repeated this hostile image. Her name came to be used proverbially for an ill-natured woman. Modern historians, however, stress that there is no contemporary source basis for this negative portrayal, and regard the “Bengerd” figure as legendary rather than based on contemporary evidence.

== Name ==
In various annals and ballads she is called Bringenilæ, Bengerd, Bengjerd and related forms.

== Early life ==
Berengaria was born in Portugal in the second half of the 1190s, probably in ca. 1198, as one of the youngest daughters of King Sancho I of Portugal (reigned 1185–1211) and his queen Dulce of Aragon. She was probably the twin sister of Branca, and their mother died in 1198, perhaps of complications from the childbirth, or succumbing to the plague. Her parents had eleven children altogether.

=== Lorvão and the Portuguese succession dispute ===
After her mother's death, she was raised together with her siblings in her father's court with his mistress "a Ribeirinha". Aged between eight and ten years old, she was sent to live with her sisters at the Monastery of Lorvão, near Coimbra. She was entrusted to the care of her twenty-year older sister Teresa, a former queen of León, who had retired to the Cistercian convent of Lorvão, following the papal annulment in 1206 of her marriage to King Alfonso IX on grounds of consanguinity. Lorvão was by then an important monastic centre and retreat for noble women.

After Sancho I died on 26 March 1211, his son (and Berengaria's brother) Afonso II sought to cut back the extensive landed and fiscal bequests their father had granted to his other children, especially his daughters. This attempt to curtail the sisters’ estates triggered a prolonged inheritance dispute, marked by years of litigation and intermittent fighting in Portugal and León. Berengaria’s guardian and elder sister, Theresa, lived in relative poverty during the struggle, and saw her supporters for a time driven into exile in León. Only after papal intervention by Innocent III would the parties lay down arms.

For a long time, Portuguese historians believed that Berengaria herself became a nun at Lorvão and died there unmarried, until Scandinavian research in the nineteenth century, demonstrated that she was identical with the Danish queen known as Bengerd. She left Portugal around 1211–1212.

=== Departure from Portugal and whereabouts ===
Amid the succession conflict, several of her siblings left Portugal. Berengaria’s elder brother Ferdinand (Ferrand) first took refuge with their aunt Teresa of Flanders, widow of Philip I of Flanders. In Paris in January 1212, Ferdinand married Joan, Countess of Flanders, Philip I's grandniece, becoming ruling count of Flanders and Hainaut, and formally a vassal of the French king. Most scholars agree that Berengaria left Portugal in the company of her brother Ferdinand and was likely sent abroad for her own safety as the succession conflict in Portugal intensified and Teresa’s position came under threat.

Upon her first arrival in the French realm, Berengaria was most likely in or near Paris, where her brother Ferrand’s marriage to Joan of Flanders was celebrated. While on their way to Flanders, the newlyweds were seized by Louis of France (the future Louis VIII), eldest son of King Philip II, who sought to recover Artois and other territories he regarded as part of his late mother’s dowry. The couple were compelled by the Treaty of Pont-à-Vendin (1212) to cede a large piece of Flemish territory including Artois. Released after this concession, Joan and Ferdinand soon joined the old allies of her father, King John of England and Emperor Otto IV, in an alliance against France. The whereabouts of Berengaria in the meantime are unknown, but she was probably with her aunt Teresa in Flanders or withheld at the French court.

== Marriage to Valdemar II ==
Berengaria was introduced to King Valdemar through his sister, Ingeborg, the wife of King Philip II of France, another of her cousins, being present at the French court.

Berengaria married Valdemar II, King of Denmark in May 1214, during the week of Pentecost (18–24 May), probably in Ribe. He was the son of Valdemar I "the Great" and Sophia of Minsk. Widowed in 1212, Valdemar had been married in 1205 to Dagmar of Bohemia, who had borne him two sons, Valdemar the Young and a stillborn son, in whose childbirth she died. Modern historians generally interpret Berengaria’s marriage to Valdemar II as part of Count Ferrand of Flanders’ broader diplomatic strategy against the French crown. After concluding an alliance in 1213 with King John of England and Emperor Otto IV, Ferrand appears to have sought the backing of the powerful Danish North Sea ruler, and Berengaria’s match is therefore commonly viewed as designed to draw Valdemar into this anti-French coalition rather than as a direct attempt to foster closer relations between Portugal and Denmark. Some historians further suggest that the connection also suited Valdemar’s own interest in drawing him closer to Otto IV and the imperial camp opposed to Philip II.

=== Issue ===
Berengaria and Valdemar had five children; three sons, one daughter and a stillborn child:

- Eric IV of Denmark (1216–1250), King of the Danes (1241–1250)
- Sophie (1217–1247), married John I, Margrave of Brandenburg
- Abel of Denmark (1218–1252), King of the Danes (1250–1252)
- Christopher I of Denmark (1219–1259), King of the Danes (1252–1259)
- Stillborn child (1221)

== Queenship ==
Old folk ballads say that on her deathbed, Dagmar of Bohemia, Valdemar's first wife, begged the king to marry Kirsten, the daughter of Karl von Rise and not the "beautiful flower" Berengaria. In other words, she predicted Berengaria's sons' fight over the throne would bring trouble to Denmark, although this is merely legend and there is no historical proof of this.

Valdemar's first wife, Dagmar of Bohemia, had been immensely popular, blonde and with Nordic looks. Queen Berengaria was the opposite, described as a dark-eyed, raven-haired beauty.

The Danes made up folk songs about Berengaria and blamed her for the high taxes Valdemar levied, although the taxes went to his war efforts, not just to his wife. The great popularity of the former queen made it difficult for the new queen to gain popularity in Denmark. She is noted to have made donations to churches and convents. Berengaria was the first Danish queen known to have worn a crown, which is mentioned in the inventory of her possessions (1225).

=== Role and dynastic significance ===
As Valdemar’s second queen, succeeding Dagmar of Bohemia, Berengaria gave birth to three sons, Erik, Abel and Christoffer, who all later became kings of Denmark, as well as to a daughter, Sophie.

Direct evidence for Berengaria’s activities as queen is sparse. She appears as a witness in a royal charter issued on the royal estate at Samsø in 1216, indicating her presence in the king’s entourage. On her marriage Berengaria received a substantial morning-gift (Danish: morgengave), the customary dower intended to secure a queen’s maintenance in widowhood. Its precise extent is unknown: early antiquarian scholarship, based on a mistranslated latin charter, assumed that it comprised the island of Samsø, but later research by Christian Bruun, has argued that it more probably consisted of estates in northern Germany (Schleswig or Holstein). Unusually, the grant was confirmed in papal bulls by both Innocent III and Honorius III. Historian Vilhelm La Cour asserts that Valdemar built Dronningholm Castle by Arresø in honour of Berengaria, not Dagmar.

Although later legend and balladry made Berengaria a central figure in narratives about Valdemar’s reign, modern scholarship repeatedly emphasises that concrete information about her queenship is “minimal and accidental”, and that almost nothing is known about her daily life at court or her direct influence on policy. Within the limits of the surviving sources, she appears primarily as a dynastic figure.

Berengaria’s marriage to Valdemar II in 1214 formed the earliest recorded Iberian-Scandinavian royal intermarriage and, together with her niece Eleanor of Portugal’s union with Valdemar the Young in 1229 and the later marriage of the Castilian infanta Isabella of Austria to Christian II, remained one of only a handful of such dynastic links between the Iberian and Nordic monarchies.

== Character and legacy ==
=== Description in written sources ===
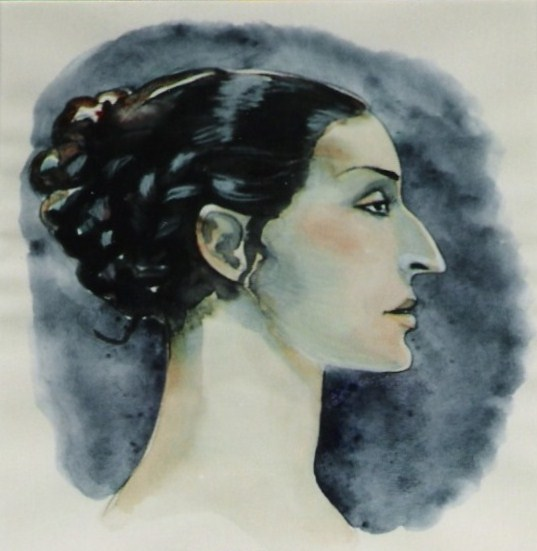
An artist's rendition of Berengaria of Portugal, 1885.

Described as "exceptionally beautiful", medieval and early modern tradition remembered Berengaria above all for her beauty. Historian Jakob Frederik Kinch writes that she left behind "a reputation for great beauty, but also for pride and severity, especially towards the peasantry". Salmonsen likewise describes her as "uncommonly beautiful". The opening of her grave in 1855 was taken by contemporaries as confirmation of this reputation, the "nobly formed skull and finely built bones" being read as physical evidence of her appearance.

=== Folk tradition and proverb ===
In Danish ballad tradition, recorded from the sixteenth century onwards, Berengaria appears under the name "Bengerd" as the antithesis of the idealised Queen Dagmar. The ballads portray her as "hard, evil, greedy and selfish", and one has Dagmar warn Valdemar against marrying Berengaria: "She is such a bitter fruit". The corruption of her name into forms such as Bengierdt gave rise to a Danish proverb in which an ill-tempered woman was called a "Bengierdt". Arild Huitfeldt's seventeenth-century chronicle drew heavily on this tradition, stating that "she was evil and counselled the taxation of peasants and commoners, and was blamed for everything ill that was done".

Author Peder Christoffersen renders the prevailing portrait of Berengaria: "Bengerd has about as bad a reputation as Dagmar has a beautiful one. A little seductive, malicious, dark-skinned, black-haired devil, apparently a nymphomaniac who dragged Valdemar into bed again and again, even though he should have spent his time on something more sensible".

=== Modern assessment ===
Modern historians are generally sceptical of the hostile portrait created by the late ballads and Huitfeldt's narrative. Jørgensen and Skovgaard note that historical research has found "nothing whatsoever that supports the fiction" of the folk poetry. Kinch likewise stresses that the value of the ballads as evidence for Berengaria's character is doubtful, partly because they were not written down until centuries after her death. The Danish Women's Biographical Encyclopedia underlines that "there is no contemporary source basis" for the image of "Bengerd" as a wicked queen opposed to the good Dagmar. The third edition of Dansk Biografisk Leksikon and the entry in Danish National Lexicon both emphasise that the late, polemical characterisation must be distinguished from what is actually known of her life, which is minimal and fragmentary.

== Death and burial ==
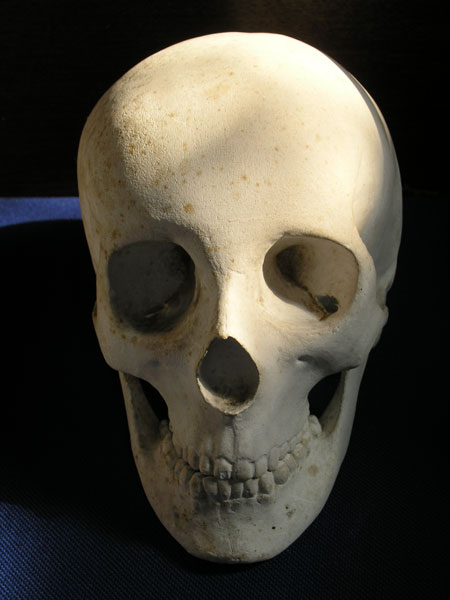
Skull of Queen Berengaria.

According to the chronicle of Henry of Latvia, Berengaria died in childbirth on 27 March 1221. She was buried in St. Bendt's Church in Ringsted, Denmark, the principal royal necropolis of the early Danish monarchy, where Valdemar II and other members of the royal family were also interred. Queen Berengaria is buried on one side of Valdemar II, with Queen Dagmar buried on the other side of the King.

=== Exhumation and physical appearance ===
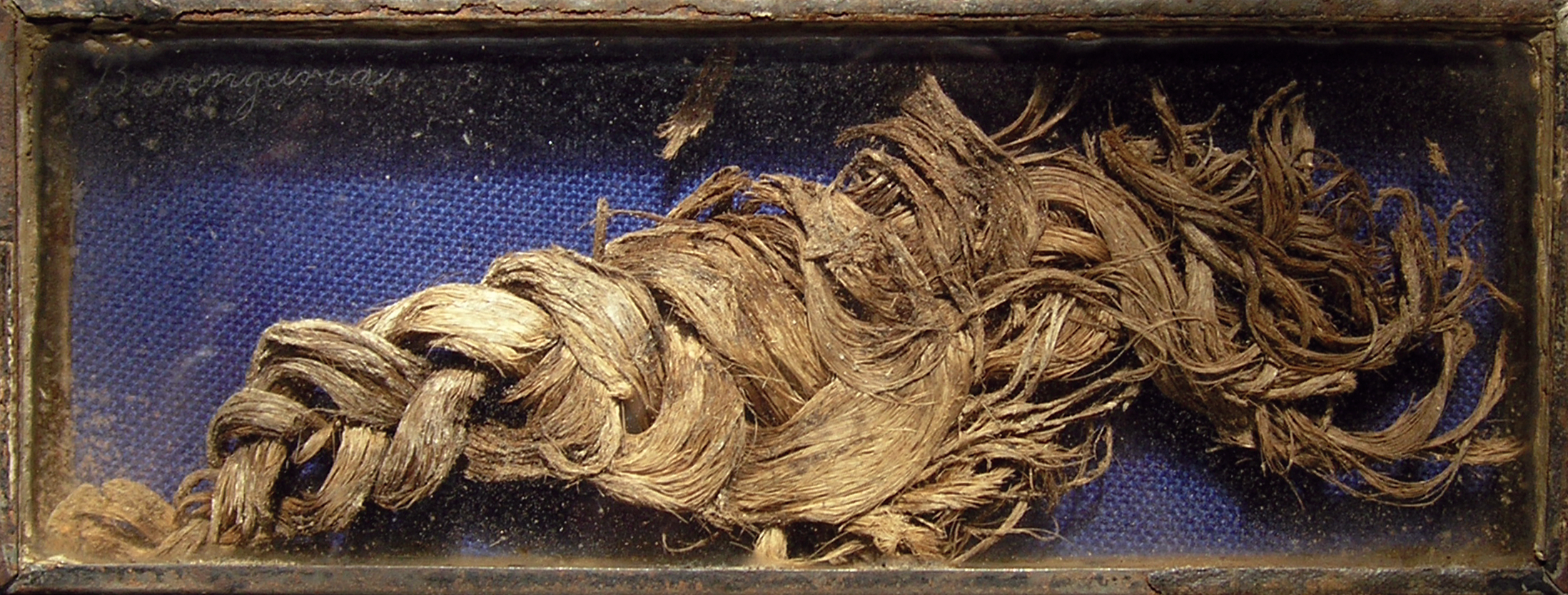
Berengaria's plait of hair in St. Bendt's Church, Ringsted

In 1855 the royal graves at Ringsted were opened. Queen Dagmar's grave was found empty, but Berengaria's tomb contained a nearly complete skeleton together with a thick plait of hair. Contemporary reports describe "a thick braid of hair, [a] nobly formed skull and finely built bones". A professor of anatomy noted that the skull was "of exceptionally beautiful form" with an oval face, prominent nasal bones and very regular, fine teeth. On the basis of the bones, Johan Henrik Chiewitz estimated her height at about 65 Danish inches (c. 1.70 m), unusually tall for a woman of the early 13th century. Later Danish scholarship has instead given 160 cm as her height. The preserved braid of hair is kept at St. Bendt's Church.

Berengaria of Portugal House of Burgundy Cadet branch of the Capetian dynasty Born: circa 1190s Died: 27 March 1221
Danish royalty
Vacant Title last held by Dagmar of Bohemia	Queen consort of Denmark; 1214–1221	Vacant Title next held by Eleanor of Portugal as junior queen
