= 14th century in Denmark =

List of events that happened in 14th century Denmark

- Other centuries
- 12th century | 13th century | 14th century

Events from the 14th century in Denmark.

== Monarchs ==
- Eric VI, 1286–1319
- Christopher II, 1320–1326 and 1329–1332
- Valdemar III, 1326–1330
  - Interregnum, 1333–1340
- Valdemar IV, 1340–1375
- Olaf II, 1376–1387
- Margaret I, 1387–1412

== Events ==
- 25 November 1317 – the Treaty of Templin is signed, ending a war between the Margraviate of Brandenburg and the kingdom of Denmark.
- 23 April 1343 – Estonians rise against to the occupying forces of Denmark, the Teutonic Order, and the Livonian Order, starting the Saint George's Night Uprising.
- 1348 – the black death becomes prevalent in Denmark, arriving, according to legend after a Norwegian plague ship became stranded on Vendsyssel. Population losses in the decades which followed led to the establishment of Vornedskab, a system of serfdom.
- 22 July 1361 – Valdemar IV's army lands on Gotland's west coast, beginning an invasion of the island.
- 27 July 1361 – Danish forces attack Visby on Gotland, and the city surrenders and pays a ransom to prevent the city from being sacked. Danish forces still sacked several ecclesiastical buildings after the ransom was paid. Before leaving the island, Valdemar IV appointed sheriffs to govern the island within his realm.
- 8 July 1362 – the Danish navy defeats the Hanseatic League's fleet at the Battle of Helsingborg.
- 1367 – the Confederation of Cologne is formed as a military alliance against the Kingdom of Denmark by city-states within the Hanseatic League.
- 24 May 1370 – the Treaty of Stralsund is signed, ending the war between the Hanseatic League and the kingdom of Denmark which had been ongoing since 1361. The treaty stipulated the destruction of Absalon's Castle.
- 25 September 1397 – the Treaty of Kalmar is signed uniting the kingdoms of Denmark, Norway, and Sweden under the Kalmar Union.

== Births ==
- 1308 – Niels Ebbesen (died 1340)
- 1314 – Valdemar III of Denmark (died 1364)
- 1320 – Valdemar IV of Denmark (died 1375)
- 1341 – Christopher, Duke of Lolland (died 1363)
- 4 January 1347 – Ingeborg of Denmark, Duchess of Mecklenburg (died 1370)
- March 1353 – Margaret I of Denmark (died 1412)
- 1358 – Ide Pedersdatter Falk (died 1399)

=== Date unknown ===
- c. 1307 – Eric Christoffersen of Denmark (died c. 1331)
- c. 1310 – Otto, Duke of Lolland and Estonia
- c. 1320 – Helvig of Schleswig (died c. 1374)

== Deaths ==
- 1304 – Erik, Duke of South Halland
- 29 September 1304 – Agnes of Brandenburg (born c. 1257 in Brandenburg)
- 1310 – Eric Longlegs, Lord of Langeland (born 1272)
- 1312 – Valdemar IV, Duke of Schleswig (born c. 1262)
- 1319 – Ingeborg Magnusdotter of Sweden (born c. 1277 in Sweden)
- 13 November 1319 – Eric VI of Denmark (born 1274)
- 12 March 1325 – Eric II, Duke of Schleswig (born c. 1290)
- 30 May 1330 – Canute Porse the Elder (born c. 1282)
- 26 July 1330 – Euphemia of Pomerania (born 1285 in Pomerania)
- 2 August 1332 – Christopher II of Denmark (born 1276)
- 1 April 1340 – Gerhard III, Count of Holstein-Rendsburg (born c. 1292 in Holstein-Rendsburg)
- 2 November 1340 – Niels Ebbesen (born 1308)
- 2 March 1341 – Martha of Denmark, Queen of Sweden (born 1277)
- 11 June 1363 – Christopher, Duke of Lolland (born 1341)
- 1354 – Valdemar III of Denmark (born 1314)
- 24 October 1375 – Valdemar IV of Denmark (born 1320)
- 3 August 1387 – Olaf II of Denmark (born 1370 in Norway)
- 15 August 1399 – Ide Pedersdatter Falk (born 1358)

=== Date unknown ===
- c. 1309 – Jacob Nielsen, Count of Halland
- c. 1331 – Eric Christoffersen of Denmark (born c. 1307)
- c. 1374 – Helvig of Schleswig (born c. 1320)
