= 13th century in Denmark =

- Other centuries
- 12th century | 13th century | 14th century

Events from the 13th century in Denmark.

== Monarchs ==
- Canute VI, 1170–1202
- Valdemar II of Denmark, 1202–1241
- Eric IV, 1241–1250
- Abel, 1250–1252
- Christopher I of Denmark, 1252–1259
- Eric V of Denmark, 1259–1286
- Eric VI of Denmark, 1286–1319

== Events ==
- 1218 – Pope Honorius III gives Valdemar II the right to annex Estonian land as part of the Livonian crusade.
- 1219 – Valdemar II establishes the Danish Duchy of Estonia.
- 15 June 1219 – Estonians attack occupying Danish forces in Tallinn at the Battle of Lyndanisse. According to legend, the Dannebrog fell from the sky during the battle.
- 1221 – Estonians attack the Danish stronghold in Tallinn at the Siege of Tallinn. After 14 days, the Estonian forces retreated.
- 22 July 1227 – Danish forces are defeated at the Battle of Bornhöved by the County of Holstein and the Hanseatic League. As a result, Holstein gains independence from Denmark.
- 7 June 1238 – the Treaty of Stensby is signed between Valdemar II and the Teutonic Order, stipulating the division of Estonian lands.
- 1275 – Erik V agrees to assist Magnus Birgersson in overthrowing King Valdemar Birgersson of Sweden for an agreed sum of 6,000 silver marks.
- 1276 – after taking the throne, Magnus Birgersson, now King Magnus III of Sweden, refuses to pay the agreed sum to Eric V. In the fall of 1276, Magnus III moves Swedish forces into Halland and Skåne, beginning the 6,000-Mark War.
- 1278 – a peace agreement is reached between Denmark and Sweden, ending the 6,000-Mark War. The agreement stipulated that Magnus III pay reparation totaling 4,000 marks.
- 6 July 1289 – King Eric II of Norway sails into the Øresund with outlaw Danish nobles, beginning the War of the Outlaws
- 7 July 1289 – Eric II's forces set fire to Helsingør before sailing to Copenhagen where they are defeated at the Battle of Copenhagen
- 9 July 1289 – Eric II's forces again set fire to the islands of Ven and Amager before they are defeated at the Battle of Skanör

== Births ==
- 1207 – Canute, Duke of Estonia (died 1260)
- 1218 – Abel, King of Denmark (died 1252)
- 1219 – Christopher I of Denmark (died 1259)
- 1241 – Sophia of Denmark, Queen of Sweden (died 1286)
- 1246 – Jutta of Denmark
- 1249 – Eric V of Denmark (died 1286)
- 1252 – Abel, Lord of Langeland (died 1279)
- 1274 – Eric VI of Denmark (died 1319)
- 29 September 1276 – Christopher II of Denmark (died 1332)
- 1277 – Martha of Denmark, Queen of Sweden (died 1341)

Date unknown

- Erik, Duke of South Halland (died 1304)
- c. 1200 – Ingerd Jakobsdatter (died 1258)
- c. 1200 – Helena Pedersdatter Strange (died c. 1255)
- c. 1209 – Valdemar the Young (died 1231)
- c. 1216 – Eric IV of Denmark (died 1250)
- c. 1244 – Ingeborg of Denmark, Queen of Norway (died 1287)
- c. 1260 – Jens Grand (died 1327 in Avignon
- c. 1262 – Valdemar IV, Duke of Schleswig (died 1312)
- c. 1265 – Agnes of Denmark (died c. 1290)
- c. 1282 – Canute Porse the Elder (died 1330)
- c. 1290 – Eric II, Duke of Schleswig (died 1325)

== Deaths ==
- 21 March 1201 – Absalon (born c. 1128)
- 6 April 1203 – William of Æbelholt (born 1125 in France)
- 1204 – Esbern Snare (born 1127)
- 1205 – Saint Anders of Slagelse
- 24 May 1212 – Dagmar of Bohemia (born c. 1186 in Meissen)
- 1218 – Niels, Count of Halland
- 8 May 1220 – Rikissa of Denmark, Queen of Sweden (born c. 1190)
- 27 March 1221 – Berengaria of Portugal (born c. 1198 in Portugal)
- 1228 – Anders Sunesen (born c. 1167)
- 28 August 1231 – Eleanor of Portugal, Queen of Denmark (born c. 1211 in Portugal)
- 28 November 1231 – Valdemar the Young (born c. 1209)
- 28 March 1241 – Valdemar II of Denmark (born 1170)
- 2 April 1244 – Henrik Harpestræng
- 10 August 1250 – Eric IV of Denmark (born c. 1216)
- 29 June 1252 – Abel, King of Denmark (born 1218)
- 1258 – Ingerd Jakobsdatter (born c. 1200)
- 29 May 1259 – Christopher I of Denmark (born 1219)
- 1260 – Canute, Duke of Estonia (born 1207)
- 27 May 1272 – Eric I, Duke of Schleswig
- 18 February 1274 – Jakob Erlandsen (died on Rügen)
- 1275 – Valdemar III, Duke of Schleswig
- 2 April 1279 – Abel, Lord of Langeland (born 1252)
- 22 November 1286 – Eric V of Denmark (born 1249)
- December 1293 – Stig Andersen Hvide
- 1294 – Rane Jonsen

Date unknown

- c. 1220 – Saxo Grammaticus (born c. 1150)
- c. 1290 – Agnes of Denmark (born c. 1265)
