= 1320s in Denmark =

Denmark-related events during the 1320s

Events from the 1320s in Denmark.

== Incumbents ==
- Monarch – Christopher II of Denmark (until 1326),Valdemar III of Denmark

== Events ==
1320

- 25 January – Christopher II of Denmark signs a håndfæstning and is elected as King of Denmark in Viborg.

1321

- Eric Christoffersen of Denmark is elected king alongside his father.
- 21 January – Kolding's oldest known market town rights.

1324

- 15 August – Coronation of Christopher II and his son Eric Christoffersen.

1325

- An alliance between Danish magnates and Gerhard III, Count of Holstein-Rendsburg and John I, Count of Holstein-Kiel, son of Adolf IV of Holstein) start a rebellion.
- Eric Christoffersen of Denmark is taken prisoner and confined in Haderslev Castle.
- Christopher II of Denmark is forced to abdicate and go into exile,
- The 12-year-old Duke Valdemar of Southern Jutland was made king of Denmark under the regent, Count Gerhard III of Holstein.

1326

- February – The new Knardrup Abbey is settled by monks from Sorø Abbey.
- Date unknown – Skive is incorporated as a market town.
- Date unknown – Vejle is incorporated as a market town.

== Births ==
- c. 1320 Valdemar IV of Denmark (died 1375)
- c. 1320 Helvig of Schleswig (died c. 1374)

== Deaths ==
- 12 March 1325 – Eric II, Duke of Schleswig (born c. 1290)
