= 1360s in Denmark =

Denmark-related events during the 1360s

Events from the 1360s in Denmark.

== Incumbents ==
- Monarch – Valdemar IV of Denmark

== Events ==
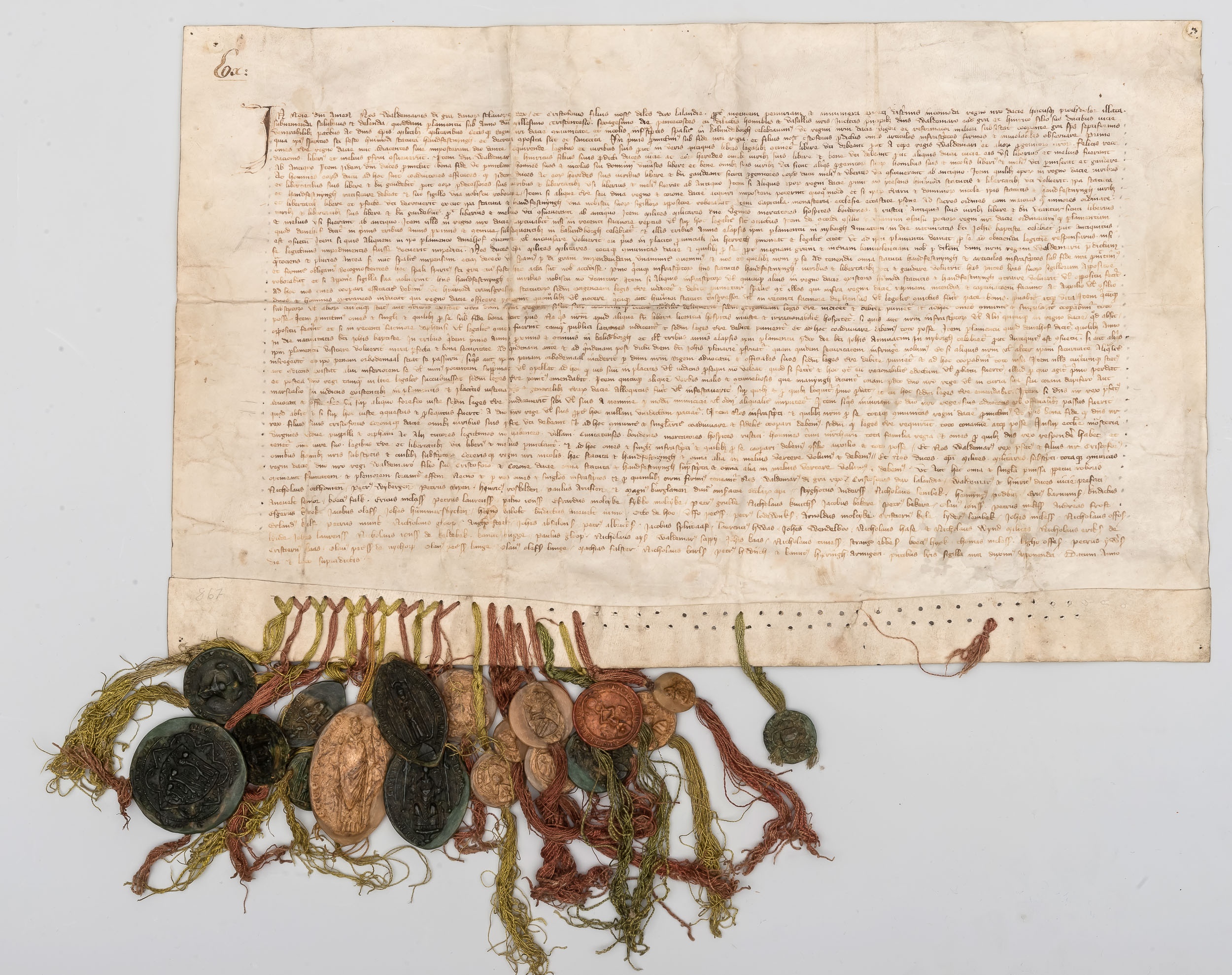
Valdemar IV's håndføstning.

1360

- 24 May – Valdemar IV's håndfæstning is signed.

1361

- 27 July – The Battle of Visby.

1362

- 13 January – The Saint Marcellus's flood.
- 6 July – The Battle of Helsingborg.

1363

- 9 April – Haakon VI and Princess Margaret (later Margaret I of Denmark) marry in Copenhagen.

1364

- Vordingborg Castle is built around this time.

1367

- The Hansa towns allies themselves with Sweden, Mecklenburg, and Holstein, and the Confederation of Cologne goes to war against Denmark and Norway.

1368

- The Hanseatic League invades Copenhagen during the Second Danish-Hanseatic War.

1369

- Absalon's Castle in Copenhagen is destroyed.

=== Undated ===
- Vesborg is constructed on the island of Samsæ.

== Deaths ==
- 11 June 1363 – Christopher, Duke of Lolland, duke (born 1341)
- 1364 – Valdemar III of Denmark, King of Denmark (born 1314)
