= 1330s in Denmark =

Denmark-related events during the 1330s

Events from the 1330s in Denmark.

== Incumbents ==
- Monarch – Christopher II of Denmark (until 1332), Interregnum (1333–1334)

== Events ==
1332

- January – Gerhard III, Count of Holstein-Rendsburg becomes the de facto ruler of Jutland and Funen.

1335

- Gerhard III confirms Odense's market town rights.

== Deaths ==
- 30 May 1330 – Canute Porse the Elder (born c. 1282)
- 26 July 1330 – Euphemia of Pomerania (born 1285 in Pomerania)
- c. 1332 – Eric Christoffersen of Denmark, King of Denmark (born 1307)
- 2 August 1332 – Christopher II of Denmark (born 1276)
