= War of the Outlaws =

Danish Norwegian war of 1289

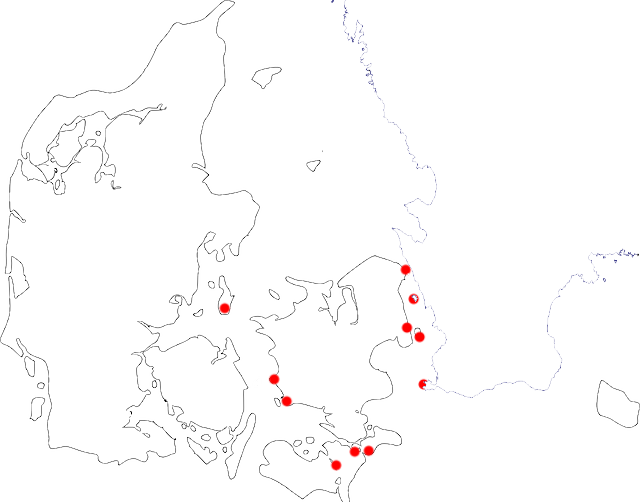
- Map of Denmark with battles fought in the war
Date	1289 – 1296
Location	Denmark, Halland & Skåne
Result	Norwegian and Danish outlaw Victory
Territorial changes	North Halland ceded to Norway

Belligerents
Denmark	(Kingdom of Norway (872–1397)) Norway (Medieval Denmark) Danish outlaws

Commanders and leaders
(Medieval Denmark) Eric VI of Denmark (Medieval Denmark) Valdemar IV Eriksøn	(Kingdom of Norway (872–1397)) Eric II of Norway (Kingdom of Norway (872–1397)) Thord Krytter † (Kingdom of Norway (872–1397)) Haakon Magnusson (Medieval Denmark) Jacob Nielsen (Medieval Denmark) Stig Andersen Hvide

Strength
Unknown	More than 230

Casualties and losses
Unknown	230; 1 Ship

The War of the Outlaws (Danish and Norwegian: De fredløses krig) also known as the Outlaw War, the Outlaw Revenge War, the Danish-Norwegian War, the Revenge War and in Denmark as the war with Norway over the archbishop's election, took place from 1289 to 1296. It was a conflict between two royal families over hereditary demands and special interests and was triggered by the murder of Eric V of Denmark.

== Background ==
The murder of Eric V of Denmark in Findrup in 1286 had political consequences for the Danish nobles who had been in opposition. Several had powerful enemies, and wished to use the opportunity to punish them. As a result, they fled to Norway, where the king ensured their safety. At the same time, a costly arbitration was concluded between the Norwegian National Board and German merchants. The Kingdom of Norway wanted to expand its territory southwards. Three years later, the Danish-Norwegian war gained the name the Outlaw War because the Danish outlawed nobles played a major role in the Norwegian war strategy against the Danish kingdom. In 1287, the Danish outlaws occupied northern Halland, swore allegiance to Eric II of Norway, and began the construction of fortresses in northern Halland.

== War ==
King Erik II's first war expedition with the outlaws, a fleet called the Leidgang, sailed into the Øresund on the night of 6 July 1289. One of the ships broke up and 160 men drowned. On 7 July, Helsingør was burned before the fleet set sail for Copenhagen. In the Siege of Copenhagen, the city withstood the attack and the Leidgang fleet sailed on.

On Saturday, 9 July, Ven and Amager were burned but at the Battle of Skanör, the Norwegian chieftain Thord Krytter fell with 70 men and the town was not destroyed. The castle in Samsø was attacked by Stig Andersen Hvide and destroyed. He also burned down Torn Borg and Skælskør, and took Nykøbing. After an unsuccessful peace agreement, the Leidgang fleet sailed south of Møn to Grønsund and landed. They attacked and destroyed Falster, burning down Stubbekøbing and attacking Stegeborg.

King Erik II undertook other war expeditions with the outlaws, and probably also with his brother Duke Haakon. He arrived in Aalborg in 1290, and remained there for 15 days in the hope that citizens would help and support him. Instead, resistance increased, forcing him to sail to Langeland, which he ravaged. He then burned down Svendborg, before turning back to Agersø and Omø on Korsør, and burned down Nykøbing in Odsherred and Holbæk. Stig Andersen Hvide landed on the island of Hjelm and fortified it, and the outlaws also fortified Sprogøe in the Storebælt and Samsø. In addition, Hunehals in northern Halland was fortified.

In 1290, Danish King Erik Menved entered into an agreement with Mecklenburg princes Henry II of Werle and Nicholas II of Werle. The princes promised that they would not help the Norwegian king for two years, allow his forces to go through their country, or permit their subjects to go serve him. In return, King Erik Menved promised the princes a considerable amount of money.

Norwegian Duke Haakon Magnusson landed on 24 August 1293 in Vejle. He issued a "protection letter" for the Chors brothers in Viborg. These were on the island of Læsø. This suggests that the Norwegians had full control of Danish waters.

A ceasefire was signed during a peace meeting at Hindsgavl Castle in 1295. The formal end of the war came in 1298.

== Aftermath ==
A settlement between the Norwegian royal family and the Danish royal family was not finalized until 1308 (1310 in alternative source), after four years of peace. A declaration of war was made in 1307 but there was no fighting. Halland was split into a northern and southern part; the southern part remained in Denmark and the northern part went to Norway. Jacob Nielsen remained count of Halland but only the part in Norway. In 1305, Halland was given to the Norwegian king's son-in-law, Eric Magnusson, as a fief from Denmark.

== See also ==
- 6000-mark war
- The war against Valdemar Birgersson
- Scottish–Norwegian War
- Eric V of Denmark
- Outlaw
