= 1390s in Denmark =

Denmark-related events during the 1390s

Events from the 1390s in Denmark.

== Incumbents ==
- Monarch – Margaret I of Denmark

== Events ==
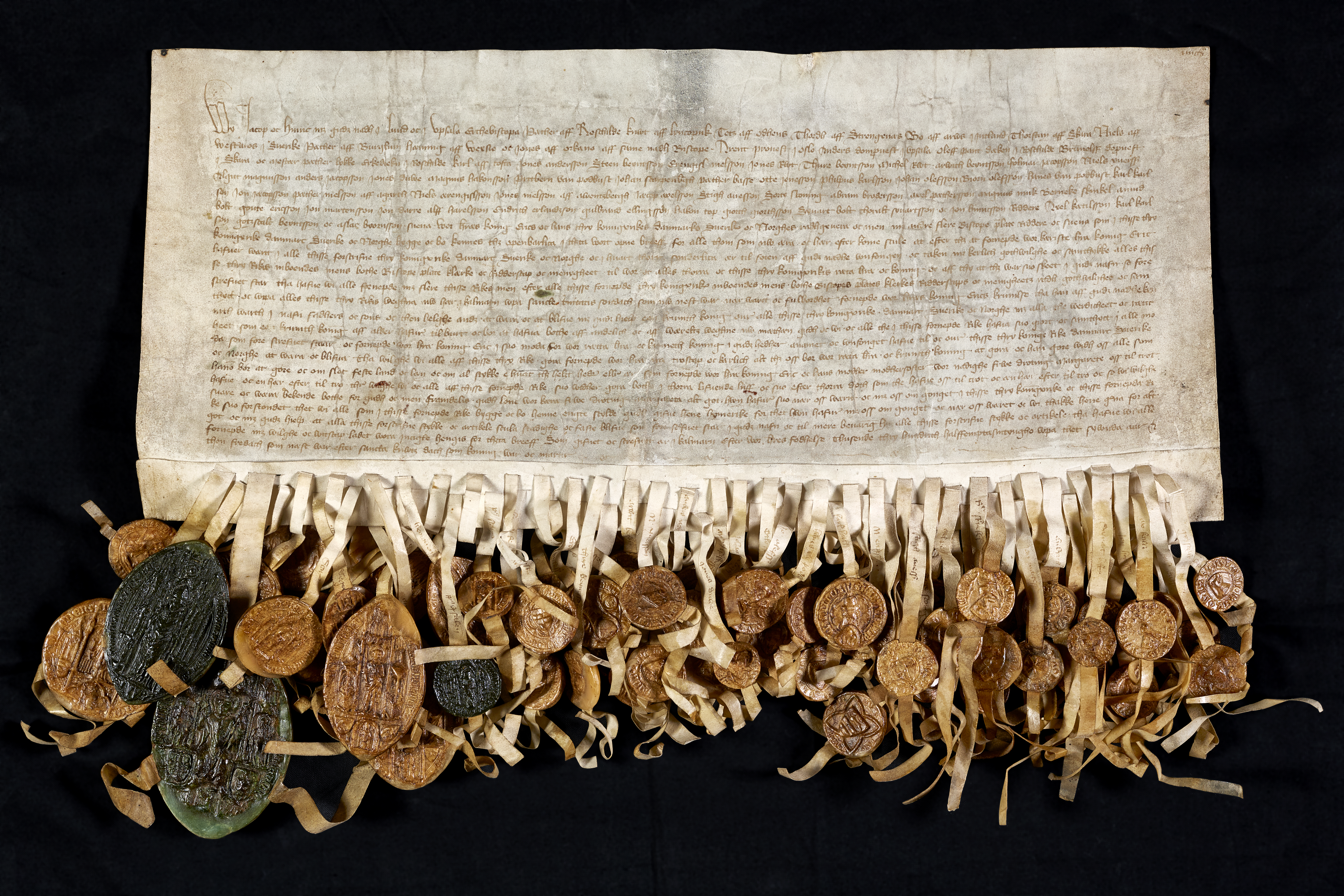
Eric of Pomerania's Coronation Letter.

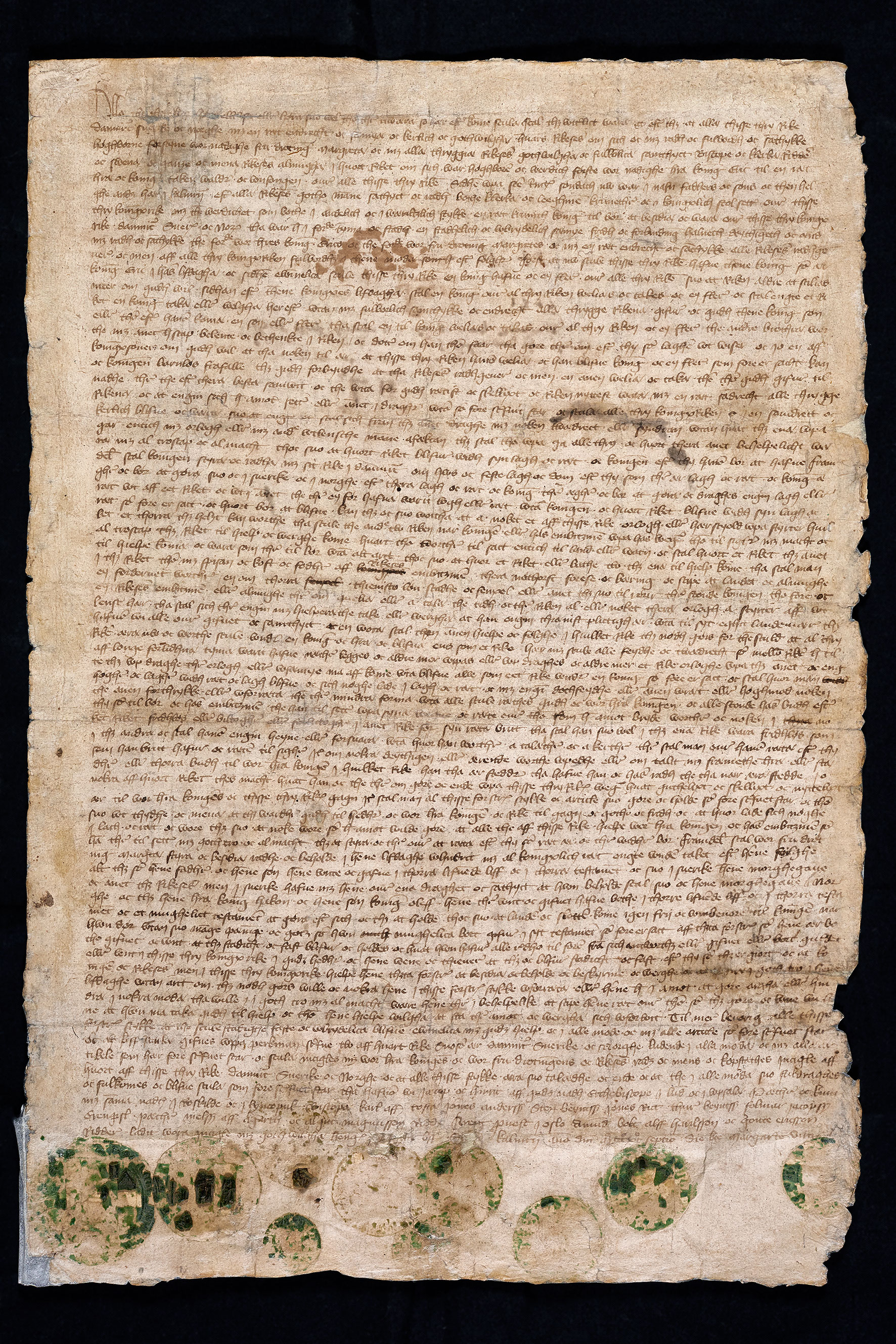
The document instituting the Kalmar Union..

1391

- Queen Margaret I takes possession of Hørningsholm (later Hirschholm Palace) north of Copenhagen.

1397

- 17 June – The coronation of Eric of Pomerania.
- 25 September – The Treaty of Kalmar is signed uniting the kingdoms of Denmark, Norway, and Sweden under the Kalmar Union.

== Deaths ==
- 15 August 1399 – Ide Pedersdatter Falk, landholder and the founder of a convent (born 1358)
