= Battle of Copenhagen =

Battle of Copenhagen may refer to:

- Battle of Copenhagen (1289), between Eric VI of Denmark and Eric II of Norway
- Bombardment of Copenhagen (1428), by ships from six Northern German Hanseatic towns
- Assault on Copenhagen (1659), a major battle during the Second Northern War, taking place during the siege of Copenhagen by the Swedish army.
- Battle of Copenhagen (1801), a naval battle between a British fleet and the Dano-Norwegian Navy
- Battle of Copenhagen (1807), a British bombardment of Copenhagen to capture or destroy the Dano-Norwegian fleet
- Battle of Copenhagen (2000), football riots that occurred during the 2000 UEFA Cup final

== See also ==
- Siege of Copenhagen (disambiguation)
