= 1340s in Denmark =

Denmark-related events during the 1330s

Events in the 1340s in Denmark.

== Incumbents ==
- Monarch – Valdemar IV of Denmark

== Events ==
1340

- 1 April – Niels Ebbesen and his men kill Gerhard III, Count of Holstein-Rendsburg in Randers.
- 24 June – The 20-year-old Valdemar IV proclaimed King of Denmark at the Viborg Assembly (landsting).

1342

- Valdemar IV recovered North Friesland, which he immediately taxes to pay off the debt on southern Jutland (7,000 silver marks).
- Aalborg is incorporated as a market town.

1343

- 23 April – Estonians rise against to the occupying forces of Denmark, the Teutonic Order, and the Livonian Order, starting the Saint George's Night Uprising.

1346

- Valdemar IB takes back Vordingborg Castle, the main headquarters of the Holsteiners. By the end of the year, Valdemar can claim all of Zealand as his own. He makes Vordingborg his personal residence and expands the castle,
- 7 December – Åkirkeby is incorporated as a market town.

== Births ==
- 1341 – Christopher, Duke of Lolland (died 1363)
- 4 January 1347 – Ingeborg of Denmark, Duchess of Mecklenburg (died 1370)

== Deaths ==
- 1 April 1340 – Gerhard III, Count of Holstein-Rendsburg (born c. 1292 in Holstein-Rendsburg)
- 2 November 1340 – Niels Ebbesen (born 1308)
- 2 March 1341 – Martha of Denmark, Queen of Sweden (born 1277)
