= Battle of Skanör =

1289 battle

- Part of War of the Outlaws
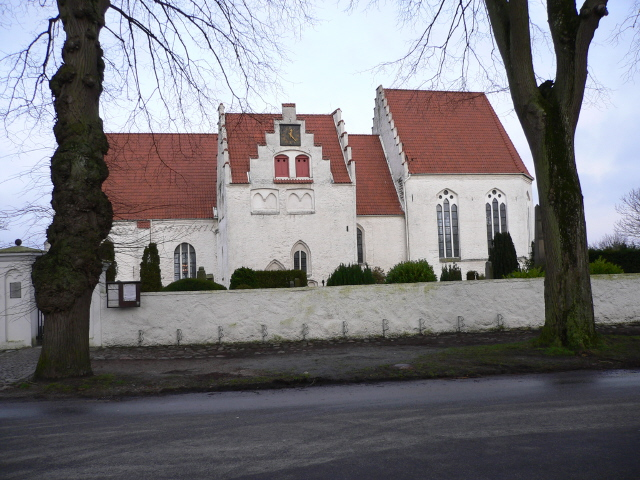
Date	9 July 1289
Location	Skanör, Denmark
Result	Danish victory

Belligerents
Denmark	Norway; Danish Outlaws

Commanders and leaders
	Eric II of Norway; Thord Krytter †

Strength
	More than 70

Casualties and losses
Unknown	70

The battle of Skanör (in present-day Sweden) was fought during the War of the Outlaws on 9 July 1289.

Following the siege of Copenhagen in 1289, the town of Skanör was attacked by the Leidgang fleet of King Eric II.

The cities of Ven and Amager had been burned the day before by the Leidgang fleet.

Skanör would not suffer the same fate as the other cities; the Norwegian Chieftain Thord Krytter fell in the battle with 70 other men, but the town was not destroyed.

It is not known if Jacob Nielsen and Stig Andersen Hvide took part in the battle but it is known they were a part of the fleet; but it is not known if the whole fleet attacked.
