= 1310s in Denmark =

Denmark-related events during the 1310s

Events from the 1310s in Denmark.

== Incumbents ==
- Monarch – Eric VI of Denmark (until 1319)

== Events ==
1316

- August – The Battle of Gransee is fought in August 1316 between the armies of a North German-Danish alliance led by the Duchy of Mecklenburg, and those of the Margraviate of Brandenburg and their allies.

1317

- 25 November – the Treaty of Templin is signed, ending a war between the Margraviate of Brandenburg and the kingdom of Denmark.
- Undated – Horsens is incorporated as a market town.

== Births ==
- c. 1319 – Otto, Duke of Lolland and Estonia, prince of Denmark (died 1346)
- 1374 – Valdemar III of Denmark (died 1364)

== Deaths ==
- 1310 – Eric Longlegs, Lord of Langeland (born 1272)
- 1312 – Valdemar IV, Duke of Schleswig (born c. 1262)
- 1319 – Ingeborg Magnusdotter of Sweden (born c. 1277 in Sweden)
- 13 November 1319 – Eric VI of Denmark (born 1274)
