= Siege of Copenhagen =

Siege of Copenhagen may refer to:

- Siege of Copenhagen (1368)
- Siege of Copenhagen (1658)
- Battle of Copenhagen (1807), in which Copenhagen was also besieged

== See also ==
- Battle of Copenhagen (disambiguation)
