= Adelaide of Holstein-Rendsburg =

- Died: January 1350
- Noble family: Schauenburg
- Spouse: Eric II, Duke of Schleswig
- Issue: Valdemar III of Denmark; Helvig, Queen of Denmark
- Father: Henry I, Count of Holstein-Rendsburg
- Mother: Helwig of Bronckhorst

Adelaide of Holstein-Rendsburg (died January 1350), Countess of Schauenburg, was the daughter of Count Henry I and his wife, Helwig of Bronckhorst. One source gives her birthdate as 1299 in Rendsburg, Rendsburg-Eckernforde, Schleswig-Holstein, Germany.

In 1313, Adelaide married Duke Eric II of Schleswig (1288–1325). They had two children:

- Valdemar III (1314–1364), King of Denmark 1326–1329, Duke of Schleswig as Valdemar V 1325–1326 and 1330–1364.
- Helvig of Schleswig (d. 1374), married Valdemar IV, King of Denmark

Both her son and her son-in-law became King of Denmark.
