= August Jerndorff =

Danish artist

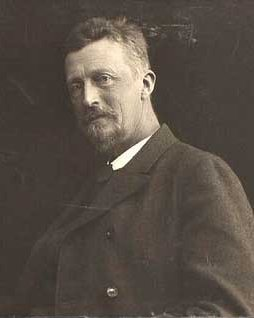
- August Jerndorff photographed by Frederik Riise
- Born: 25 January 1846; Oldenburg, Germany
- Died: 28 July 1906 (aged 60); Copenhagen, Denmark
- Resting place: Vestre Kirkegård
- Education: Royal Danish Academy of Fine Arts
- Known for: Painting
- Movement: Realism
- Spouse: Betty Marie Matthison-Hansen
- Awards: Order of the Dannebrog (1897); Thorvaldsen Medal (1884); Neuhausens Prize (1869)

August Andreas Jerndorff (25 January 1846 – 28 July 1906) was a Danish painter who is best known for his portraits.

== Biography ==
August Jarndorff was born in Oldenburg in Lower Saxony. His parents were Just Ulrik Jerndorff (1806-1847), painter to the Oldenburg Court, and Nancy Caroline née Jones (1809-1877).

He trained first under Christian Hetsch (1830–1903), artistic director at the Royal Porcelain Factory. He attended the Royal Danish Academy of Fine Arts from 1863 to 1868 and studied privately with P. C. Skovgaard (1817–1875). He made his debut as a painter in 1866. In 1869, he received the Neuhausens Prize. In 1875, he received the Royal Academy's travel scholarship and traveled to Italy, where he lived from 1875 to 1878. He became acquainted with but remained relatively unaffected by the latest Realist tendencies in European painting.

In 1880, alongside Laurits Tuxen (1853–1927) and Frans Schwartz (1850–1917), he was a co-founder of a painting academy at Søkvæsthuset on Christianshavn in Copenhagen which served as a precursor of Kunstnernes Frie Studieskoler which were founded two years later.

He received the Thorvaldsen Medal in 1884 and became a professor at the Royal Academy of Fine Arts in 1891.

== Paintings ==
Jerndorff started his career as a landscape painter under the influence of Skovgaard, but soon turned to portrait painting and Biblical subjects. He is best known for a number of monumental portraits which were painted for the Danish museum of National History at Frederiksborg Castle. His religious paintings include 12 Apostles for Jesus Church in Copenhagen, altar pieces for Saint Peter's Church and the church in Nykøbing Mors, and landscapes.

=== Decorative arts ===
Together with Thorvald Bindesbøll, Otto Haslund, and Joakim Skovgaard, Jerndorff also worked with ceramics in the mid-1880s, a collaboration that led to the foundation of the Dekorationsforeningen society in 1887. With the same collaborators he illustrated Holger Drachmann's Troldhøj.

== Personal life ==
In 1875, he married Betty Marie Matthison-Hansen (1856-1940). His cousin Peter Jerndorff (1842–1926) was a stage actor and opera singer.

== Gallery ==
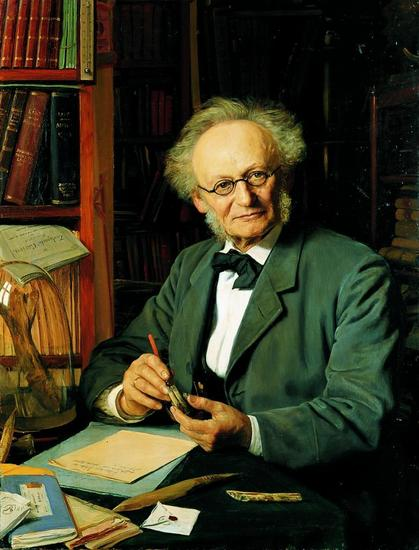
Japetus Steenstrup, 1885

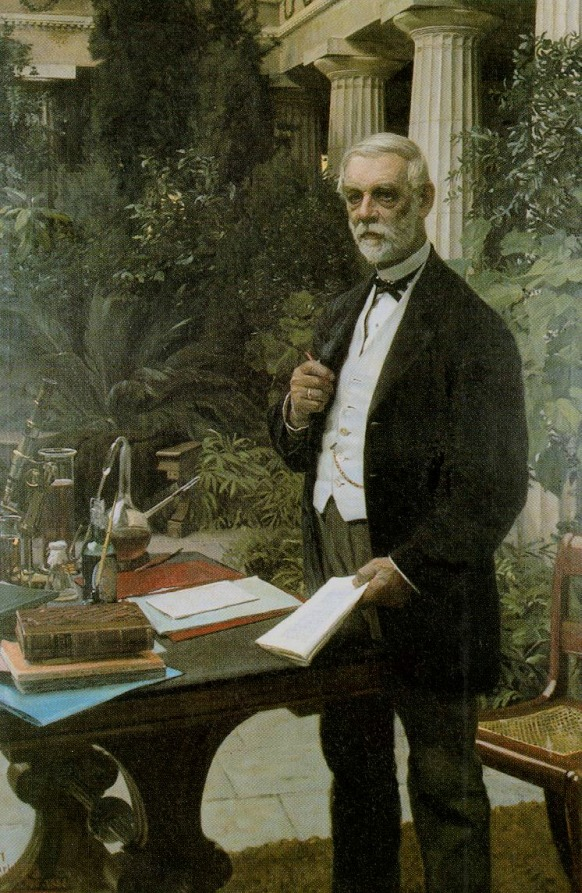
J.C. Jacobsen, 1886

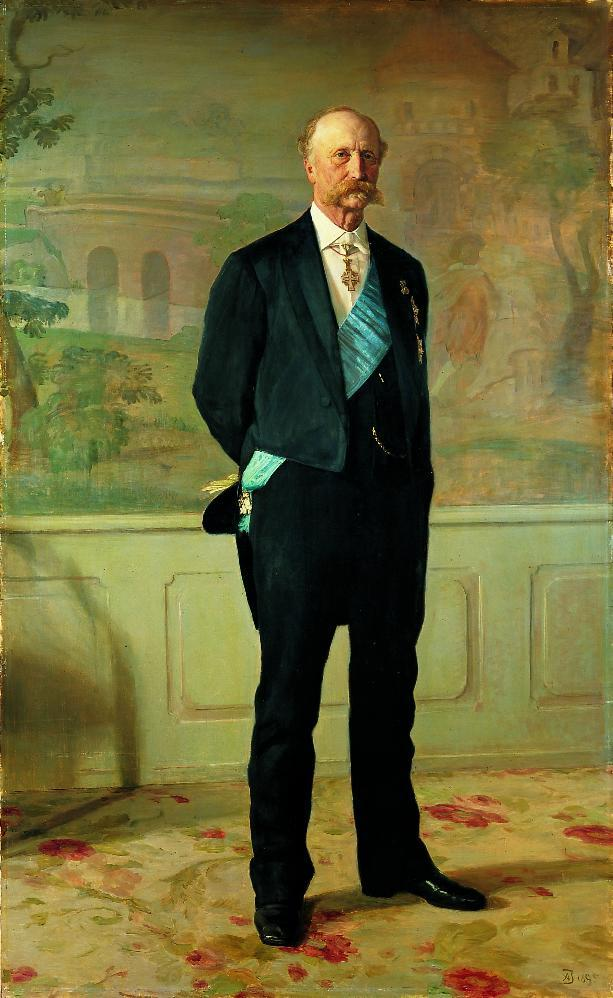
Jacob Brønnum Scavenius Estrup, 1895

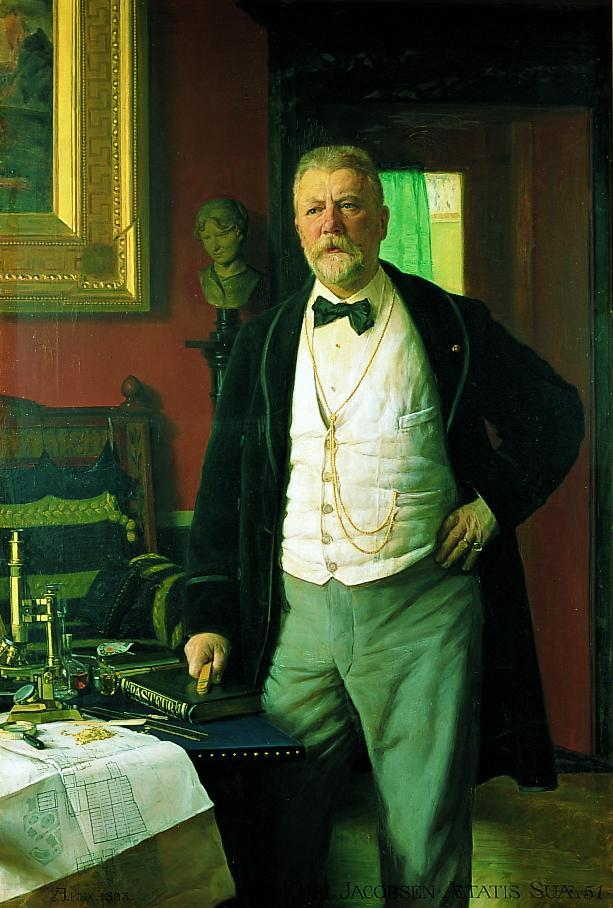
Carl Jacobsen, 1893

== See also ==
- Art of Denmark
