= 1410s in Denmark =

Events from the 1410s in Denmark.

== Incumbents ==
- Monarch – Eric of Pomerania

== Events ==
1413

- 22 January – Skagen is incorporated as a market town.
- 7 December – Kerteminde is incorporated as a market town. It is established that the citizens have the same rights as those of Svendborg and Faaborg. Alle harbours between Knudshoved and Fynshoved are prohibited.

1416

- Maribo Abbey—the first Bridgettine abbey in Denmark—is established in the town of Skimminge on a gift of land (Grimstrup) from Queen Margaret I

== Births ==
- 26 February 1418– Christopher III, King of Denmark, Norway and Sweden (died 1448)

Unknown date

- c. 1415 – Erik Axelsson Tott, statesman, regent of Sweden (died 1467)

== Deaths ==
- 27 August 1410 – Abraham Brodersson, statesman and military commander
- 28 October 1412– Margaret I of Denmark, queen of Denmark, Norway and Sweden (born 1353)
- 19 October 1416 – Peder Jensen Lodehat, bishop and politician
