= 6000-mark war =

War between Sweden and Denmark (1276–78)

6000 marks war
Date	1276 – 1278
Location	Halland, Skåne, Västergötland & Sweden.
Result	Danish victory

Belligerents
Denmark	Sweden

Commanders and leaders
Eric V of Denmark; Stig Andersen Hvide	Magnus Birgersson; Ulf Karlsson

Strength
Unknown	More than 200

Casualties and losses
Unknown	Probably 120

The 6000-mark war (Swedish: 6000-markskriget, Danish: 6000-marks-krigen) was a war between Denmark and Sweden which took place from 1276 to 1278. It started because of a disagreement over an agreed sum of 6,000 silver marks for Danish assistance to Magnus Birgersson in the battle against Valdemar Birgersson in 1275.

== Background ==
Eric V of Denmark had signed an agreement on military assistance with Duke Magnus Birgersson who hired hundreds of armored warriors from the danish king's own army in addition to a strength of 700 men which was led by Count Jacob of Halland and the Danish Stig Andersen Hvide. Together they started a rebellion against Valdemar, King of Sweden which was known as the war against Valdemar Birgersson. It resulted in Magnus becoming King of Sweden.

== War ==
Duke Magnus Birgersson proclaiming himself king of Sweden, refused to pay the agreed sum of 6,000 marks of silver and complained about the ravages the Danish Assistance Force allegedly committed. Instead, he started a war by moving into the then Danish provinces of Halland and Skåne by total surprise in the fall of 1276. The Danes mobilized an army near Uffo marches and stopped the Swedish army, which then fled Scania. The next year Danish forces marched on Småland in retaliation for their depredations in Halland and Skåne. The Danish punitive expedition followed the scarce Swedish Defense Forces into Västergötland, where they met a Swedish part of the army of about 200 knights in armor, led by Ulf Karlsson. The Battle of Ettak was a defeat for the Danish army who were surprised in their own camp. Erik Klipping gathered a large army in 1277 and went into Västergötland which again was overcome and looted. The fortresses of Axvall and Skara was captured by the Danish army. Eric V of Denmark decided to end the campaign because it was not meant as anything other than an act of revenge in response to the Swedish king's assault on Halland and Skåne. After returning home, Eric V of Denmark began negotiations with the Swedes leading to a peace agreement in Laholm, Scania in early 1278. Magnus Birgersson had to pay war reparations which were reduced from 6,000 to 4,000 marks of silver.

== Aftermath ==
The war resulted in Magnus Birgersson remaining king of Sweden but he had to pay 4,000 marks of silver to the Danes.
