= Saint Peter's Church, Slagelse =

Coordinates: 55°24′07″N 11°20′58″E

Saint Peter's Church
- Sankt Peders Kirke
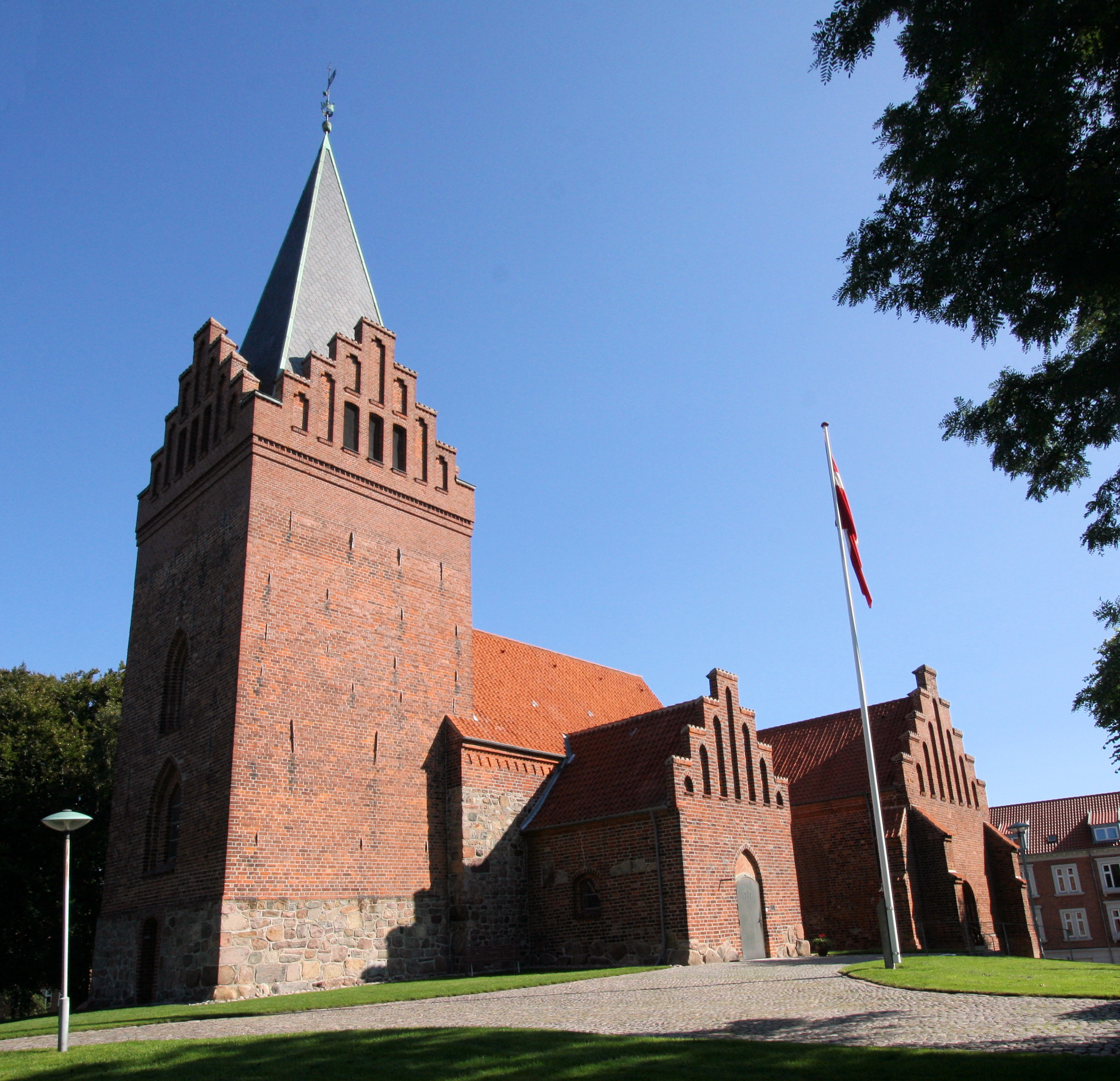
- Saint Peter's Church
- Location: Slagelse, Denmark
- Denomination: Church of Denmark
- Previous denomination: Roman Catholic Church
- Website: www.sctpederskirke.dk

Architecture
- Architectural type: Cruciform church
- Style: Romanesque style Gothic style
- Completed: 12th century

Administration
- Diocese: Diocese of Roskilde
- Deanery: Slagelse Provsti
- Parish: Sankt Peders Sogn

Saint Peter's Church (Danish: Sankt Peders Kirke) is a Lutheran church located in the center of Slagelse, Denmark. The congregation was originally part of the Roman Catholic Church, but was converted to Lutheranism during the Reformation.

The church was originally built in the 12th century out of stone, but it has since received a variety of brick extensions and renovations. The church's steady expansions reflect the continued growth of the town. In the 14th century, Saint Michael's Church (Danish: Sankt Mikkels Kirke) was built and replaced Saint Peter's Church as the main parish church of Slagelse.

Saint Anders of Slagelse was a priest at the church in the late 12th century. After his death in 1205, he was venerated by local practitioners for various miracles he is believed to have performed, despite never being canonized.

== Architecture ==
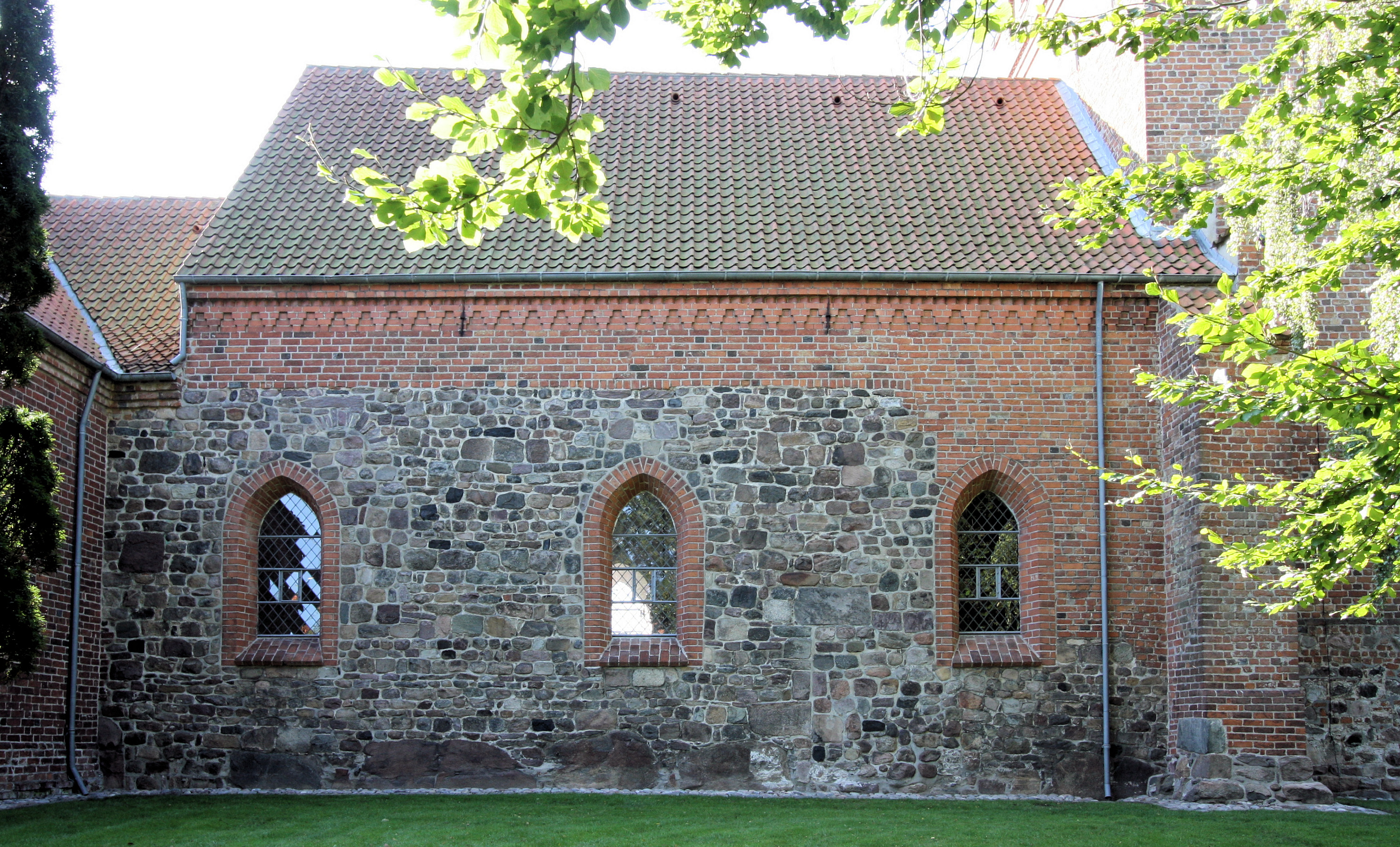
Northern wall of the nave

The oldest part of the church was built in the romanesque style in the 12th century from stone. The lower walls of the nave still show the church's original stone, which transitions into the brick added by later renovations. In the early 14th century, two additions to the church added a choir on the eastern side of the nave and a church porch. Later in the 14th century, a second chapel was added to the south so that the floor plan of the church resembled a cross. At the same time, the ceiling was reconstructed to include vaults. The sacristy was built in the early 16th century and had vaulted ceilings to match the renovations to the nave.

The church's original tower, which had been built in the Middle Ages, blew over in 1660. It was replaced in 1664 with the current tower which is dated by iron anchors and Frederick III's monogram. The lower part of the tower, which was built out of large stones, may have been reused from the original tower's foundation. In the tower entrance there is a memorial stone to Hans Spirhugger, who had rebuilt the tower in 1664 and died at Antvorskov in 1683.

By 1818, the church had become so dilapidated that its closure was considered. Instead, structural repairs were carried out; most notably, the spire of the tower was removed and replaced with a mansard roof. During restorations in 1871, the mansard roof was again removed and replaced by the pyramidal spire that the church has today.

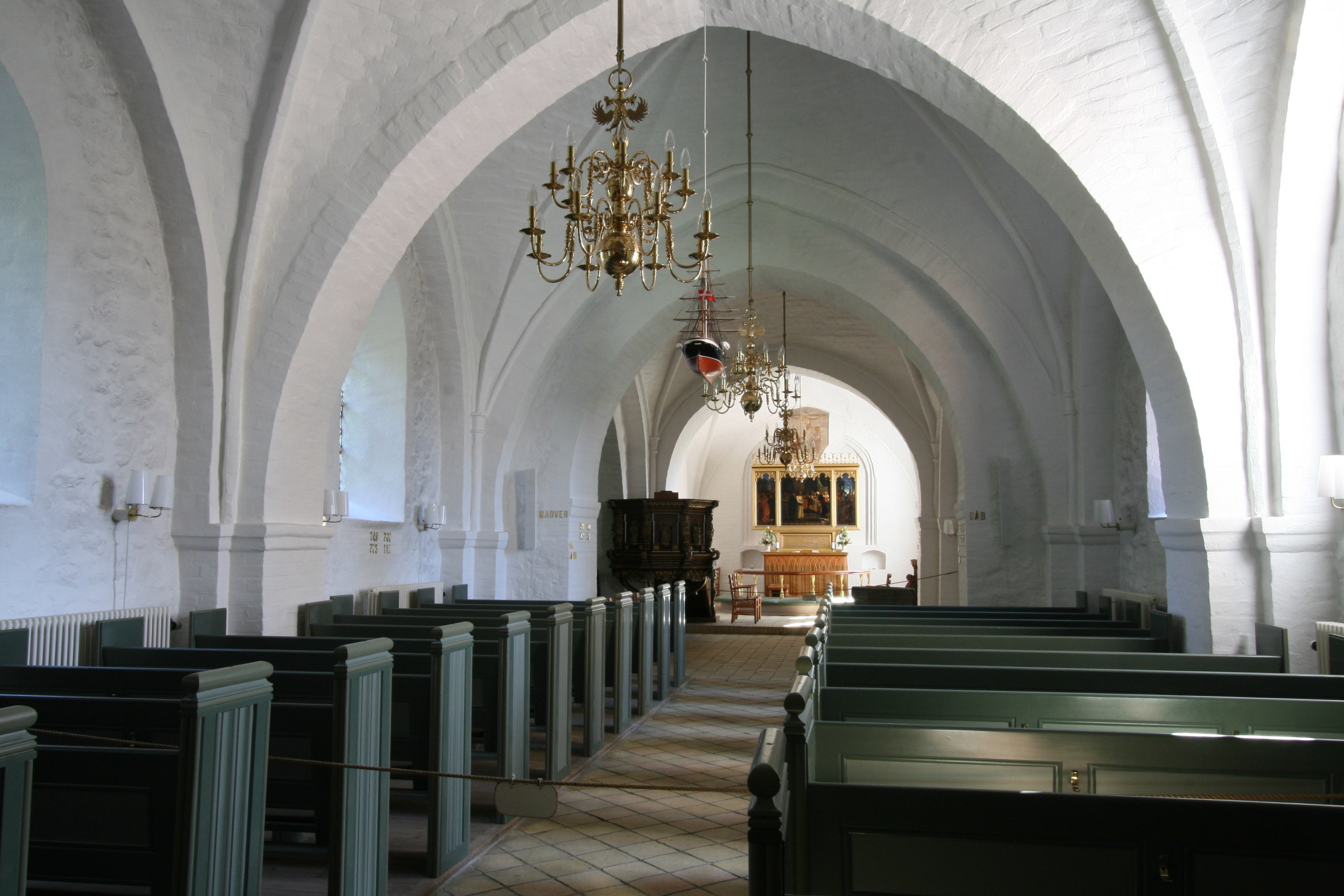
Interior seen from the western end of the church

A later restoration, completed in 1880 by Johan Daniel Herholdt, plastered the interior of the church. The project revealed a fresco behind the altar from 1350 which was then restored by Jacob Kornerup. Most of windows in the church date to Herholdt's restoration, though two east facing windows are considered to be original. The pews were also added 1880, though a single gothic pew was "rediscovered" in 1856, which may have originated from Antvorskov monastery.

In its form today, the church is considered a cruciform church because its floor plan resembles a latin cross. The tower is built on the western end of the nave, the church porch to the south, and the sacristy on the southern end. The interior walls of the church are whitewashed and vaulted. The floor is laid with yellow tile, and the choir is raised a step above the nave.

== Fixtures ==
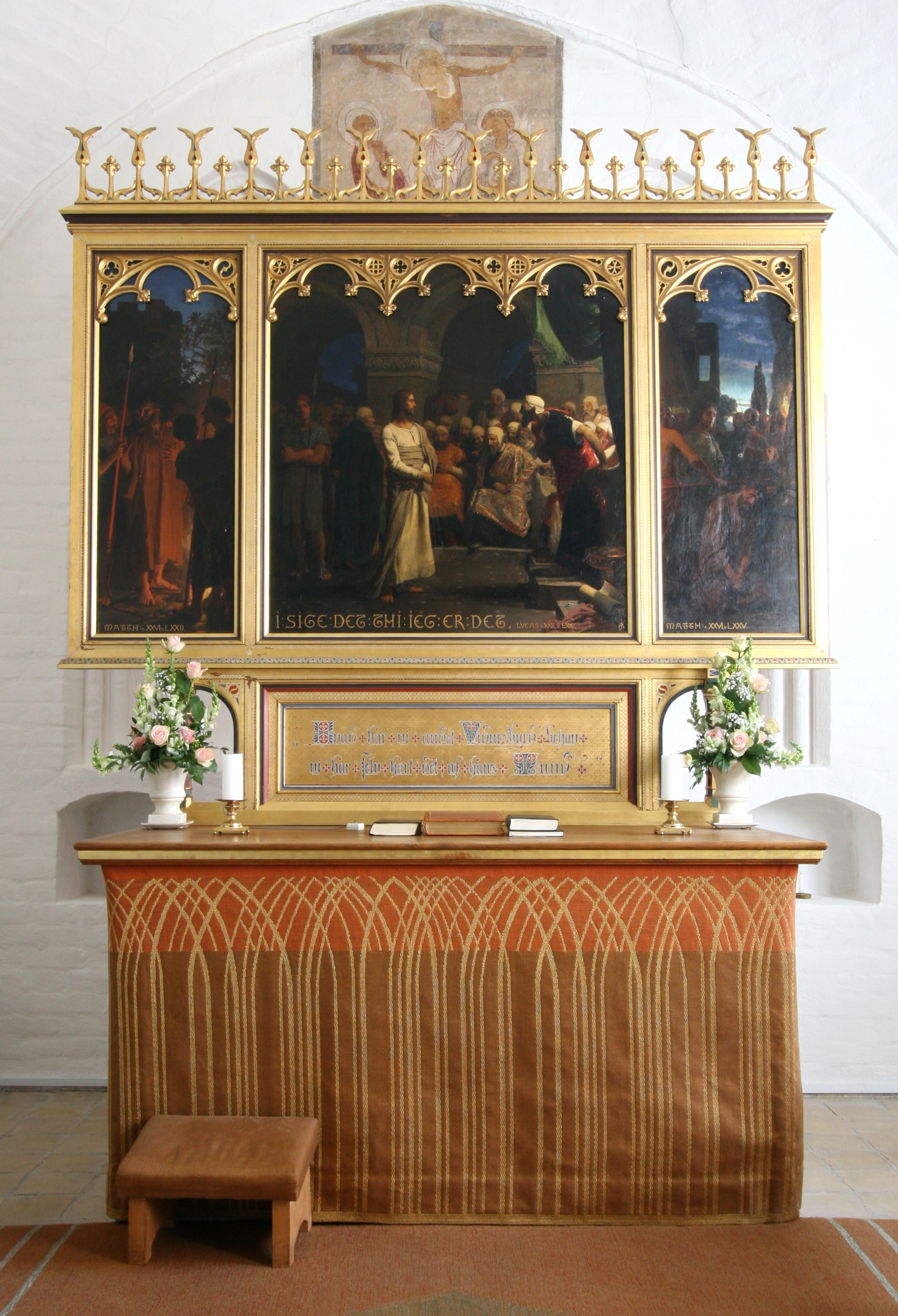
Altar in front of the 14th century fresco

The altar was constructed from brick. During the 19th century a relic was found encased in a vault of the altar that has since become part of the National Museum's collection. The church's first altarpiece was replaced by one from Antvorskov when the monastery was demolished. The altarpiece was again replaced in 1882 with a piece by August Jerndorff which is still in use today. It is divided into three fields which depict the denial of Peter, the Sanhedrin trial of Jesus, and the repentance of Peter. A side altarpiece is hung to the north of the choir, which dates back to the 14th century. The side altarpiece depicts Saint Dionysius of Paris. Because Saint Dionysius was martyred after being decapitated, he is often depicted carrying his own head in his hands, but in this illustration only the top of his mitre has been cut off. The granite baptismal font is from the 13th century and is carved from an unusual octagonal shape, which suggests that it was original made for another purpose. This theory is supported by the fact that it came from Antvorskov monastery, which would not have performed baptisms. The brass dish inlaid in the font is from the 17th century.

The pulpit was built around 1630 in the late renaissance style. It is constructed in an octagonal shape, where only five of its faces are visible. In 1880, this pulpit had been replaced, but was later reinstalled in the early 20th century. The pulpit originally had a matching sounding board, but it was not reinstalled. In 1950, the pulpit was restored by Peter Axelsen.

The church has two votive ships named Haabet and Ørnen. Haabet, which means the hope, was built in 1800. It was created by Johs Rasmussen, a blacksmith from Slagelse, reportedly after he had gone blind. Haabet was restored in 1998 by Ove Andersen. Ørnen, which translates to the Owl, was built by a painter from Slagelse, Ove Andersen. The ship was commissioned and donated by Ole Haugaard, who died in April 1997 and did not live to see it hung in the nave on December 14, 1997. At Haugaard's request, one and two øre pieces were laid under the masts.

The organ was installed by Poul-Gerhard Andersen of Copenhagen in 1974. It has 20 registers which are divided into sets of manuals and pedals. There is no record of previous organs in the church.

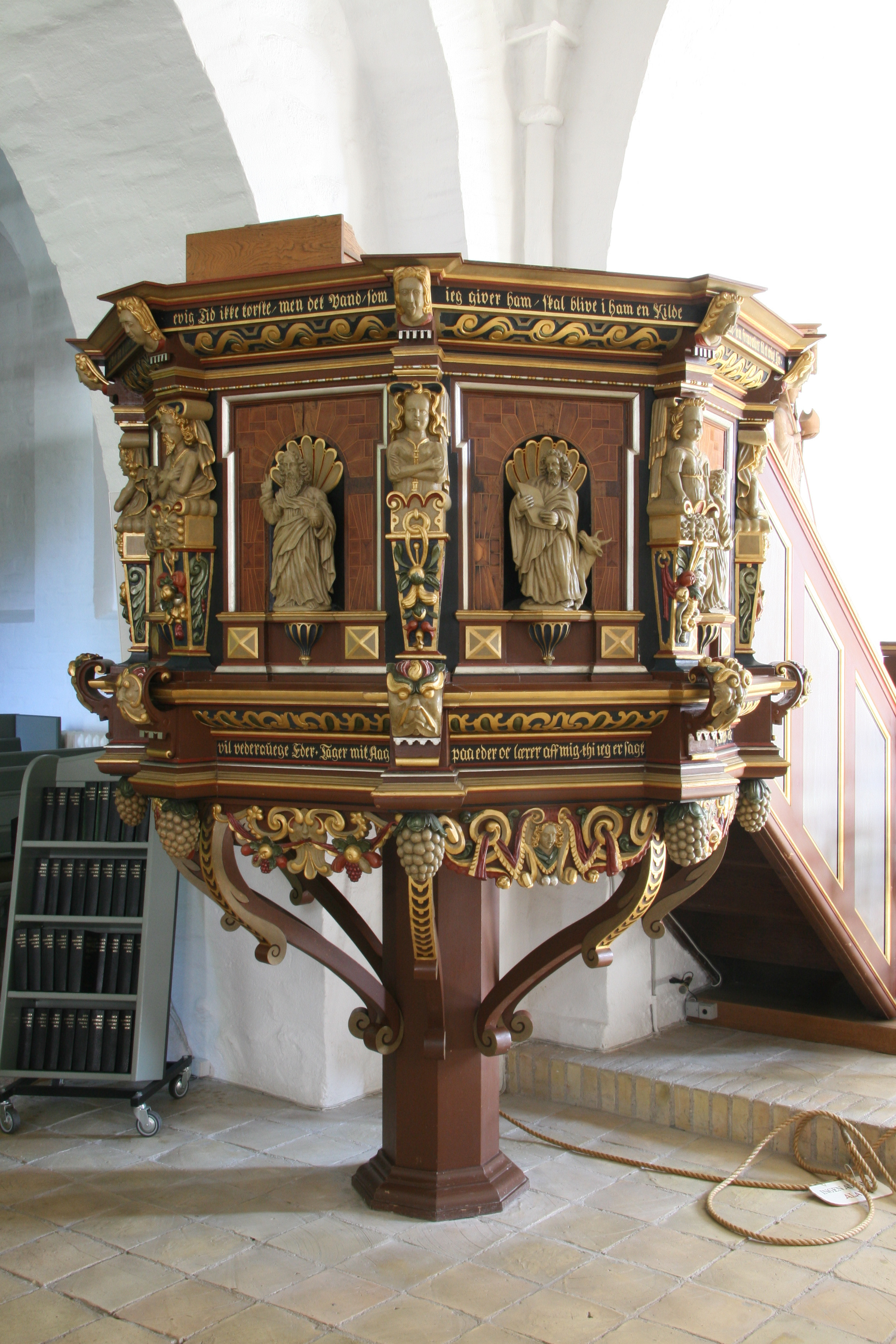
Pulpit

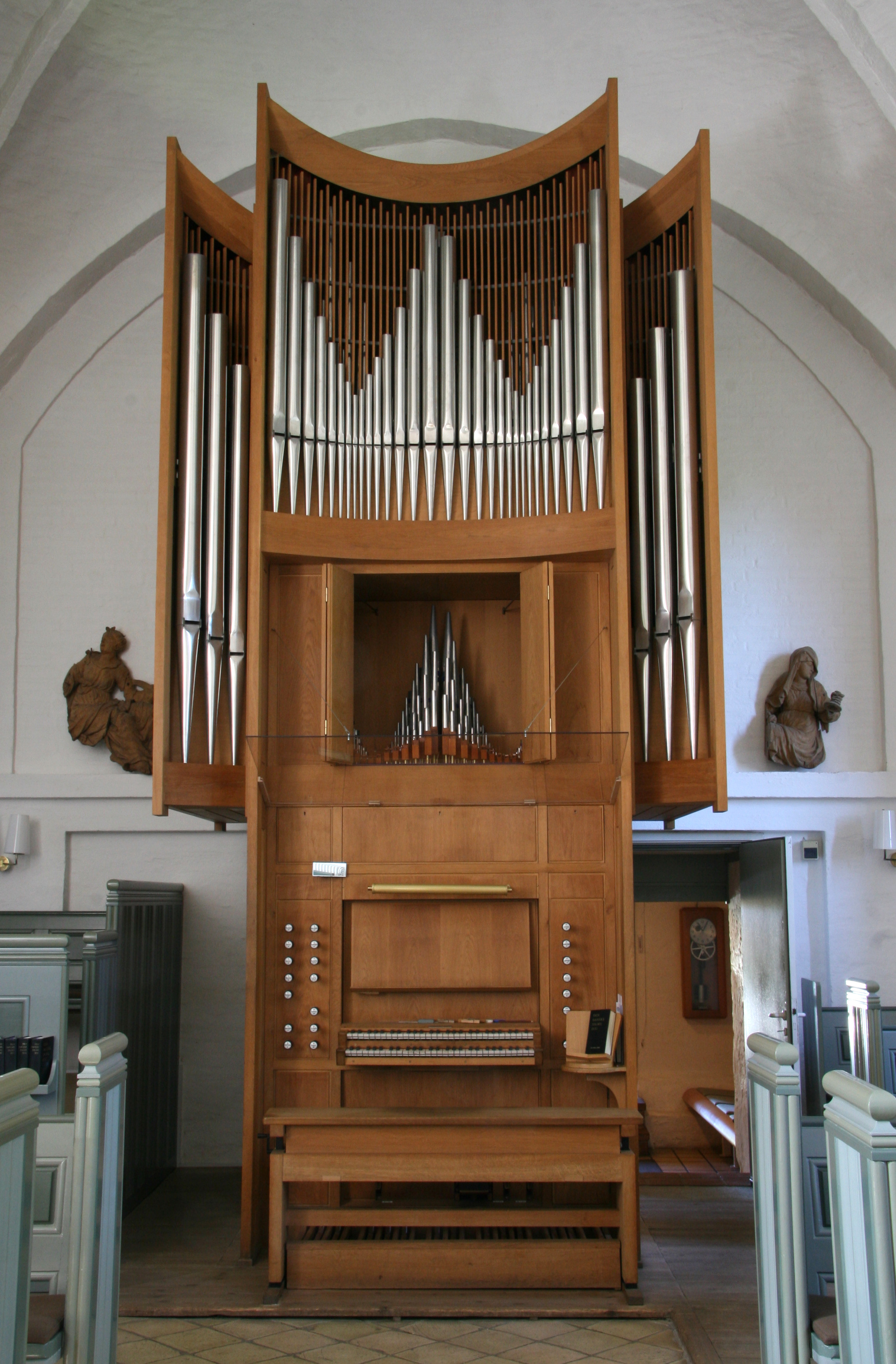
Organ built by P.G. Andersen, 1971

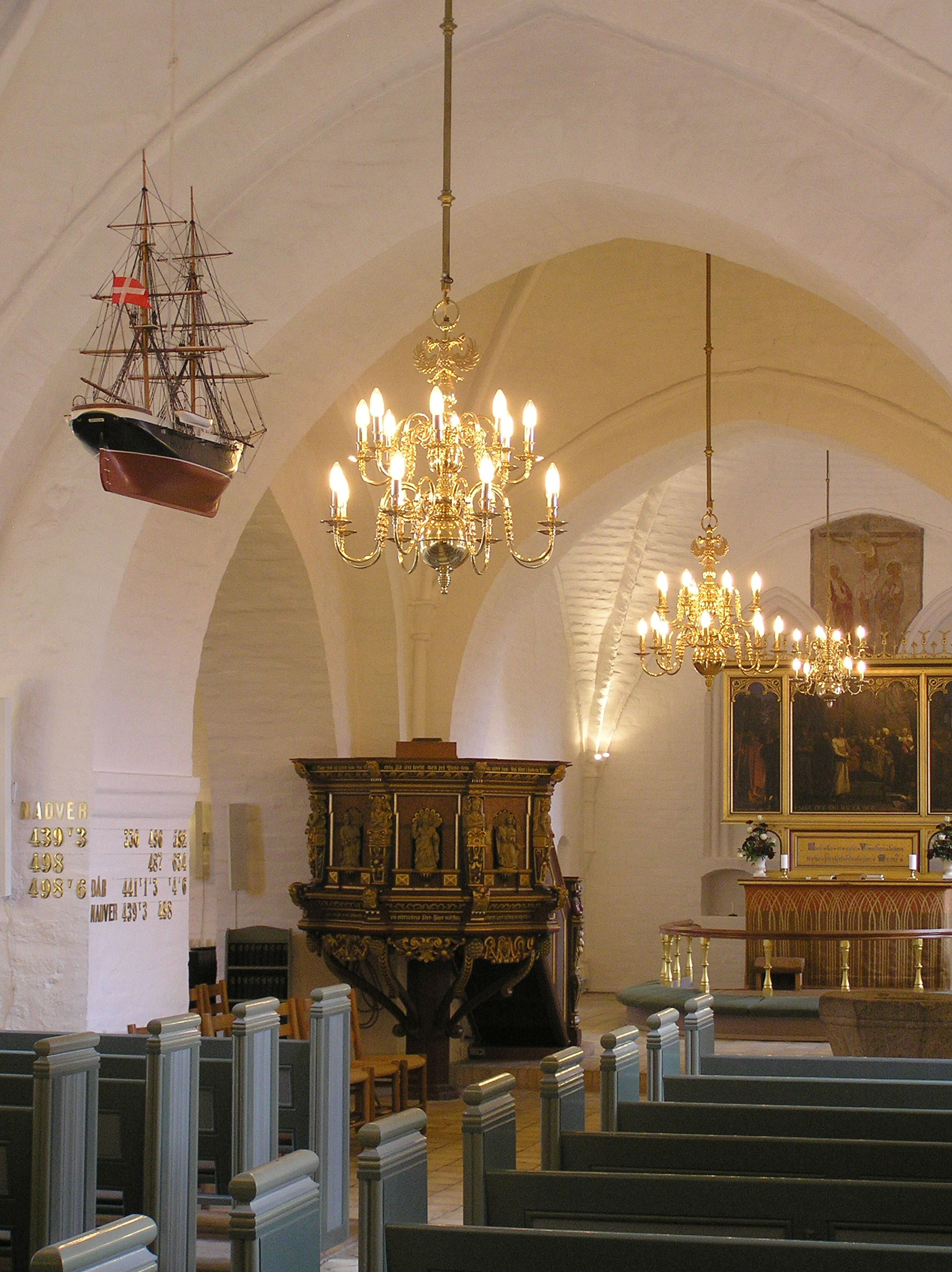
Ørnen above the nave

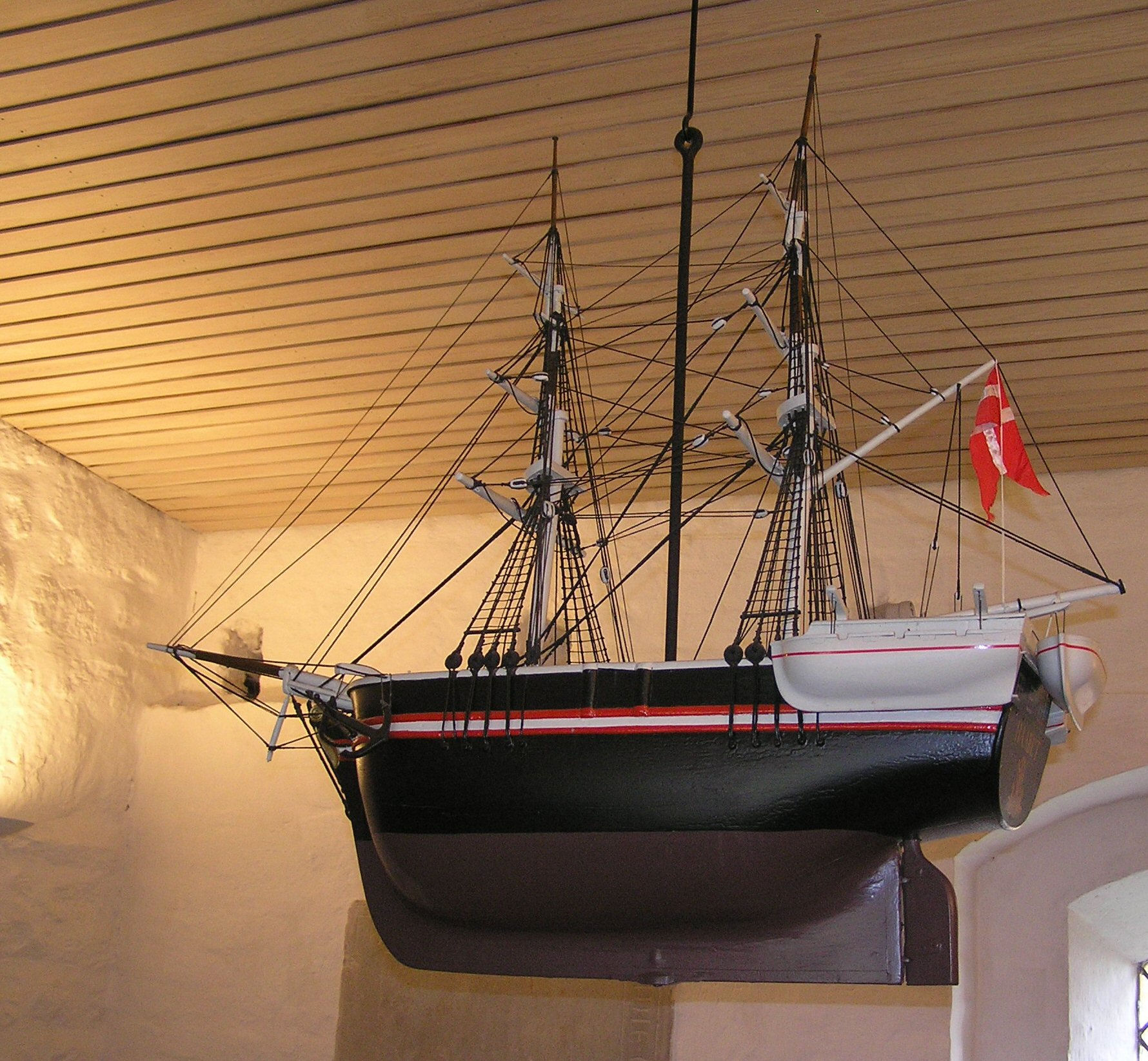
Haabet votive ship

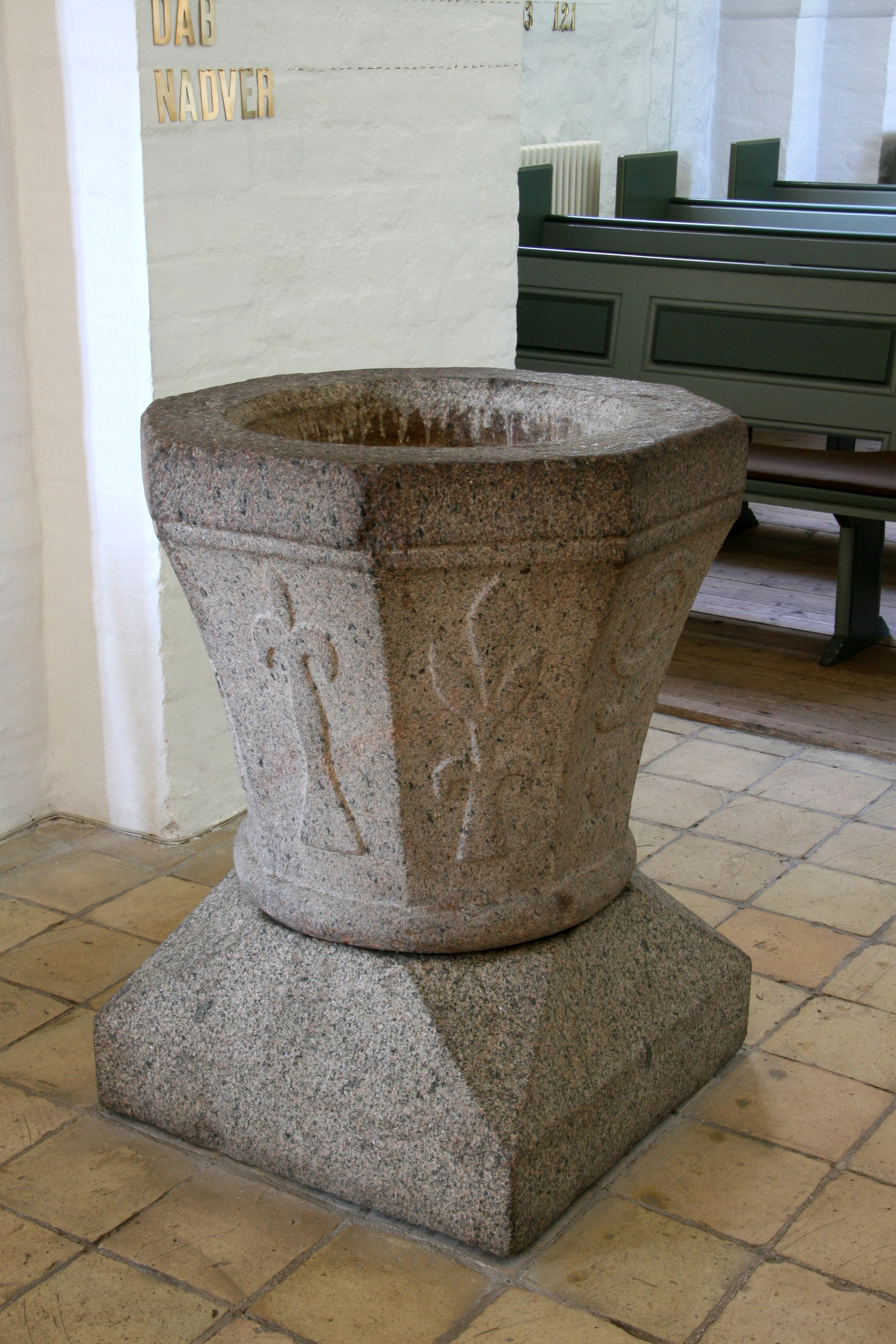
Baptismal font

== Saint Anders of Slagelse ==
The church is connected to the legend of Saint Anders of Slagelse, who had been a priest at the church in the late 12th century. Though he was never canonized by the Roman Catholic church, he has been venerated by local practitioners. It is believed that he was buried at the church after his death in 1205.

According to legend, Anders had been traveling with twelve other people from Slagelse on a pilgrimage. He parted ways with his traveling companions in Jaffa because he wanted to attend a pentecost service in Jerusalem. While alone, he fell asleep on a hill outside the city of Jaffa and had a vision where he was visited by a rider on a white horse. The rider offered to take Anders with him, and soon dropped him off outside of Slagelse on a hill that he called Hvilehøj. After his return to Denmark, Anders was said to have performed several miracles which healed the ill and blind.

Anders was also reportedly a good friend of King Valdemar II. On one occasion, the king is said to have offered him as much land for his parish as he could ride around on a nine-day-old foal in the time it took the king to take a bath. Taking a bath was a tedious and time-consuming task at the time, but the king doubted that Anders would be able to cover much ground. Anders took up the king's offer, and he covered enough ground that a squire had to warn the king to finish his bath hastily before he lost too much land. In his haste, Anders dropped a glove near the town of Landsgrav. A spring later emerged from where his glove had fallen which was visited well into the 18th century for its alleged healing properties.
