= Franciscan Friary, Copenhagen =

Coordinates: 55°40′47″N 12°34′33″E

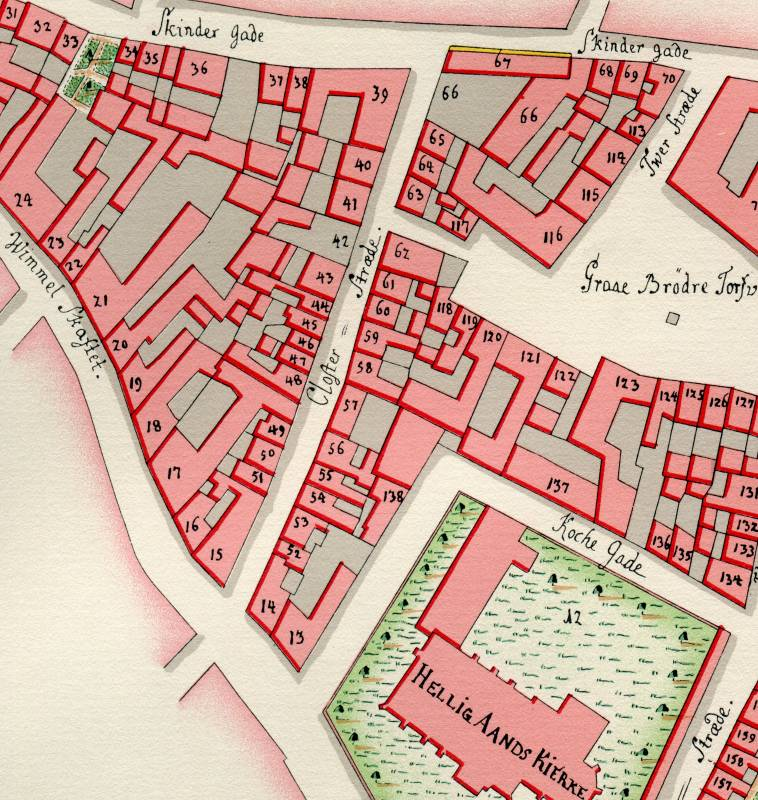
Detail of Christian Gedde's district map showing Klosterstræde

The Franciscan Friary, Copenhagen (also known as Greyfriars - Danish: Gråbrødrene) was the most important Franciscan friary in Denmark.

== History ==
The friary of the Franciscans in Copenhagen was founded in 1238 by Countess Ingerd of Revenstein. She was one of Denmark's wealthiest women of the period, a member of the powerful Hvide family. She was the daughter of Jacob Sunesen, and the sister of Bishop Peder Sunesen of Roskilde. She had become acquainted with the Franciscans, a relatively new order, while she lived in Germany with her husband. She founded several Franciscan houses in Denmark, including the one in Copenhagen, to whom she gave the farm which stood at the time outside the town. The friary was run by the Guardian and several brothers with specific responsibilities for the hospital, guest house, and so forth.

Over time the friary acquired several properties scattered through Copenhagen which provided a good income through rents. Though it was officially forbidden for the friars to receive money, the rule was bent enough to make life a little easier for them, who were nicknamed the "beggar monks" because they could be seen on the streets asking for gifts of food. The friary also received remuneration for praying for the souls of the recently departed.

The friary consisted at its height of a church, a refectory, a great hall which was used on many occasions for important state meetings and meetings of the provincial which governed Franciscan monasteries in Denmark.

Within the enclosing walls could be found a guesthouse, a hospital for the sick and poor, quarters for lay brothers, a large garden, a brewery, and an apple orchard. They also maintained a house for a brother at Dragør.

The Franciscan church was renowned for its many relics, including those of Saint Olav, Saint Erik, Saint Canute, Saint Eskil, Abbot Vilhelm, Saint Bridget, Saint Willehad, and many others.

=== Dissolution ===
Already in the 1520s many people in Copenhagen flocked to hear the preaching of the new Lutheran doctrines. Many Danes felt that the tithes and additional requests to fund religious houses were excessive and an early target of the anti-Catholic party were the "beggar monks". Led by the mayor of Copenhagen, the town fathers made it illegal for monks or friars to go out into the street to beg for food or alms. Because it was done lawfully, the guardian and vice-guardian of the friary had no redress and therefore wrote a letter dated 25 April 1530 conveying the friary and its contents and properties away from the Franciscan order, with an explanation of the reasons for abandoning it: "...Since we are required for the sake of many weighty reasons, and the ordinary people in Copenhagen will not permit us [to be] here... and we are locked inside [our friary] and may not go into the street to ask for God's alms."

The brothers abandoned the friary immediately thereafter.

Eight of the brothers who had learned a craft removed their habits, married and settled down in Copenhagen with the help of the magistrate and citizens. Several months passed before the crown administrators decided that the church, conventual buildings and burial ground would be turned over to the University of Copenhagen for income. New streets were laid out through the former garden and apple orchard. Rent from the houses owned by the friary were used to support the hospital.

Frederik I issued a royal decree on 6 August 1532 which changed all of that: the monastery, church and income-producing houses were now all given over to fund the work of the hospital for the benefit of the poor and sick.

The church tower was a visible part of the city skyline as late as 1596. The huge cellars of the friary became the town jail and eventually the church itself was converted to a prison. In 1621 Christian IV added an orphanage and recommissioned the church as a house of worship, though it was called the "Prison Church".

The friary buildings were mostly destroyed in the fires of 1728 and 1807. Others were pulled down to make room for private houses and businesses.

Parts of the thick outside walls and conventual buildings were incorporated into new structures near Grayfriars Market Square in Copenhagen, but there is today little evidence of the hundreds of years of occupancy by the Franciscans at Grayfriars.

== Sources ==
- Nielsen, Oluf, nd: Kjøbenhavns Historie (in Danish)
