= 1440s in Denmark =

Events from the 1440s in Denmark.

== Incumbents ==
- Monarch – Christopher III (until 5 January 1448), Christian I
- Steward of the Realm – Albrecht Morer (1439–40), Erik Nielsen Gyldenstjerne (1441–42), Otte Nielsen Rosenkrantz (1445–52)

== Events ==
1443

- 1 January – Coronation of Christopher III in Ribe Cathedral.

1448

- Christian I becomes King.

1449

- 28 October – Coronation of Christian I in Copenhagen.

== Deaths ==
1448

- 5 January – Christopher III (b. 1418)
