= Battle of Copenhagen (1289) =

Medieval battle in Denmark

- Part of War of the Outlaws
Date	7 July 1289
Location	Copenhagen, Denmark
Result	Danish victory

Belligerents
Denmark	Norway; Danish Outlaws

Commanders and leaders
Eric VI of Denmark	Eric II of Norway; Thord Krytter; Jacob Nielsen; Stig Andersen Hvide

Strength
Unknown	More than 70

Casualties and losses
Unknown	Unknown

The murder of Eric V of Denmark in Finderup in 1286, had political consequences for the Danish nobles who had been in opposition. Several had powerful enemies, and wished to use the opportunity to punish them. As a result, they fled to Norway where the king ensured their protection. At the same time a costly arbitration was concluded between the Norwegian National Board and German merchants. The Kingdom of Norway (872–1397) had a desire for territorial expansion southwards. Three years later, the Danish-Norwegian war began to be termed the war of the outlaw, one of the many places that the Leidgang fleet attacked was Copenhagen.

The battle was a part of King Erik II's first war expedition together with the outlaws sailed into the Øresund on the night of 6 July 1289. By accident, one of the ships broke up and 160 men drowned. The fleet was called the Leidgang. On 7 July Helsingør was burned before they set sail for Copenhagen the same day, Copenhagen withstood the attack and the Leidgang fleet sailed further down Zealand, the next day they sailed to Amager, Ven and then Skanör where the battle of Skanör would happen. It is unknown how many died.
