= Knardrup Abbey =

Monastery in Denmark

Coordinates: 55°46′00″N 12°18′00″E

Knardrup Abbey (Danish: Knardrup Kloster; Latin: Conventus regalis curiae) was the last medieval Cistercian foundation in Denmark. It was situated to the north-west of Copenhagen between Ganløse and Måløv.

== History ==
The monastery was founded shortly before 1326 by King Christopher II on the royal estate of Knardrupsgård as a daughter house of Sorø Abbey and settled in February 1326 by monks from Sorø. The abbey remained in existence until 1536 when it was secularised as a crown estate and given to the University of Copenhagen. The building materials were later used for the construction of Frederiksborg Castle.

The abbey site is now partly built over, and there are no visible remains of the monastery.

== Sources and external links ==
- Knardrup Kloster (in Danish)
- Cistercienserordenen (in Danish)
