= 1460s in Denmark =

Events from the 1460s in Denmark.

== Incumbents ==
- Monarch — King Christian I
- Steward of the Realm – Erik Ottesen Rosenkrantz

== Events ==
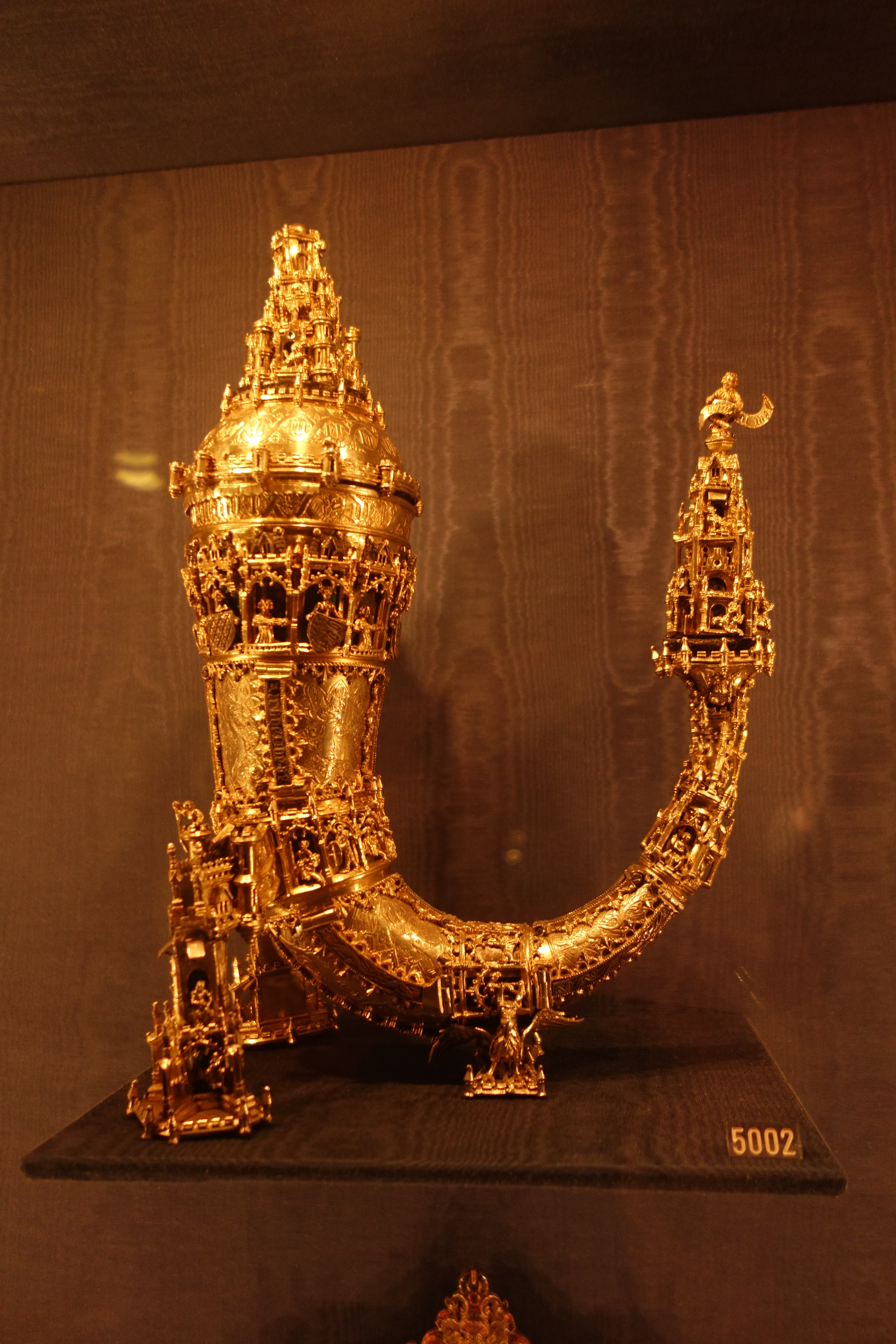
The Oldenburg Horn

1460

- 5 March – The Treaty of Ribe returns Duchy of Schleswig to Denmark and makes Christian I Count of Golstein.

(C.) 1465

- The Oldenburg Horn is created.

== Births ==
- c. 1460 – Aage Jepsen Sparre, archbishop (d. 1540)
- c. 1465 – Mette Dyre, noble, nominal sheriff and chancellor (d. c. 1533)
