= Ingerd Jakobsdatter =

Ingerd Jakobsdatter, also called Ingerd af Regenstein (1200–1258) was a Danish noble, countess of Regenstein by marriage to count Konrad III of Regenstein. She established the Franciscan and Dominican order in Denmark, and was the founder of the female Franciscan abbey Skt. Clara Kloster af Damiani Orden.

Ingerd was the daughter of Jakob Sunesen af Møn (d. 1246) and Estrid (d. 1246) and belonged to the powerful Danish noble clan Hvide. Before 1224, she married the Danish office holder Skore (d. before 1237), and before 1245 the German count Conrad III of Regenstein (d. before 1253). During her second marriage, she lived in Germany, but she returned to Denmark as a widow.

Through great land donations, she established the orders of Franciscan and Dominican order in Denmark, in 1236 and 1253 respectively. The first act was done in 1236, when she founded the Franciscan Friary, Copenhagen.

Twenty years later, she introduced the Dominican order in Denmark. She was a correspondent of Clare of Assisi and Agnes of Bohemia, and in 1254, she was given permission by the pope to establish a female Dominican convent in Roskilde, Skt. Clara Kloster af Damiani Orden, to which she donated all her substantial fortune and property and herself entered.

== See also ==
- Ide Pedersdatter Falk
