= Erik, Duke of South Halland =

Danish duke and drost (died 1304)

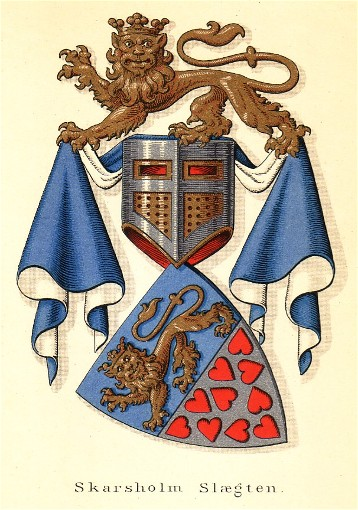
Erik's coat of arms

Erik Knudsen (died 1304) was a Danish duke and drost. He was the youngest son of Canute, Duke of Estonia and Jadviga of Rügen. This made him a grandson of Valdemar II of Denmark and cousin of the contemporary king, Erik Klipping of Denmark.

After his father's death in 1260, he seems to have settled on Zealand. By 1279 he was living on his estate of Skarsholm and served as the chairman of the Zealand thing. In 1283 he was appointed Drost of Denmark, but he held the office only briefly and was replaced by Uffe Nielsen in 1284. Erik was then granted the four southernmost counties of Halland as a fief and made a duke. In 1285 he was knighted by King Magnus Ladulås of Sweden. Little is recorded of him after that until 1295, when the armistice of Hindsgavl between Danish and Norwegian kings mentions a dispute between Erik and the Danish king. He died in 1304 and was buried in Ringsted.

Erik's coat of arms featured a crowned lion over ten hearts. The same coat of arms was used by his kinsman Jakob Nielsen, Count of North Halland.

Erik had a son, Barnum (died 1400), who held estates at Ågesholm and Skarsholm on Zealand. Barnum played no political rule, but in 1375, after the death of King Valdemar Atterdag of Denmark and Duke Henry of Schleswig, he appears to have been the only surviving male descendant of the Danish royal line.
