= Henry I of Holstein-Rendsburg =

Count of Holstein-Rendsburg

Henry I, Count of Holstein-Rendsburg
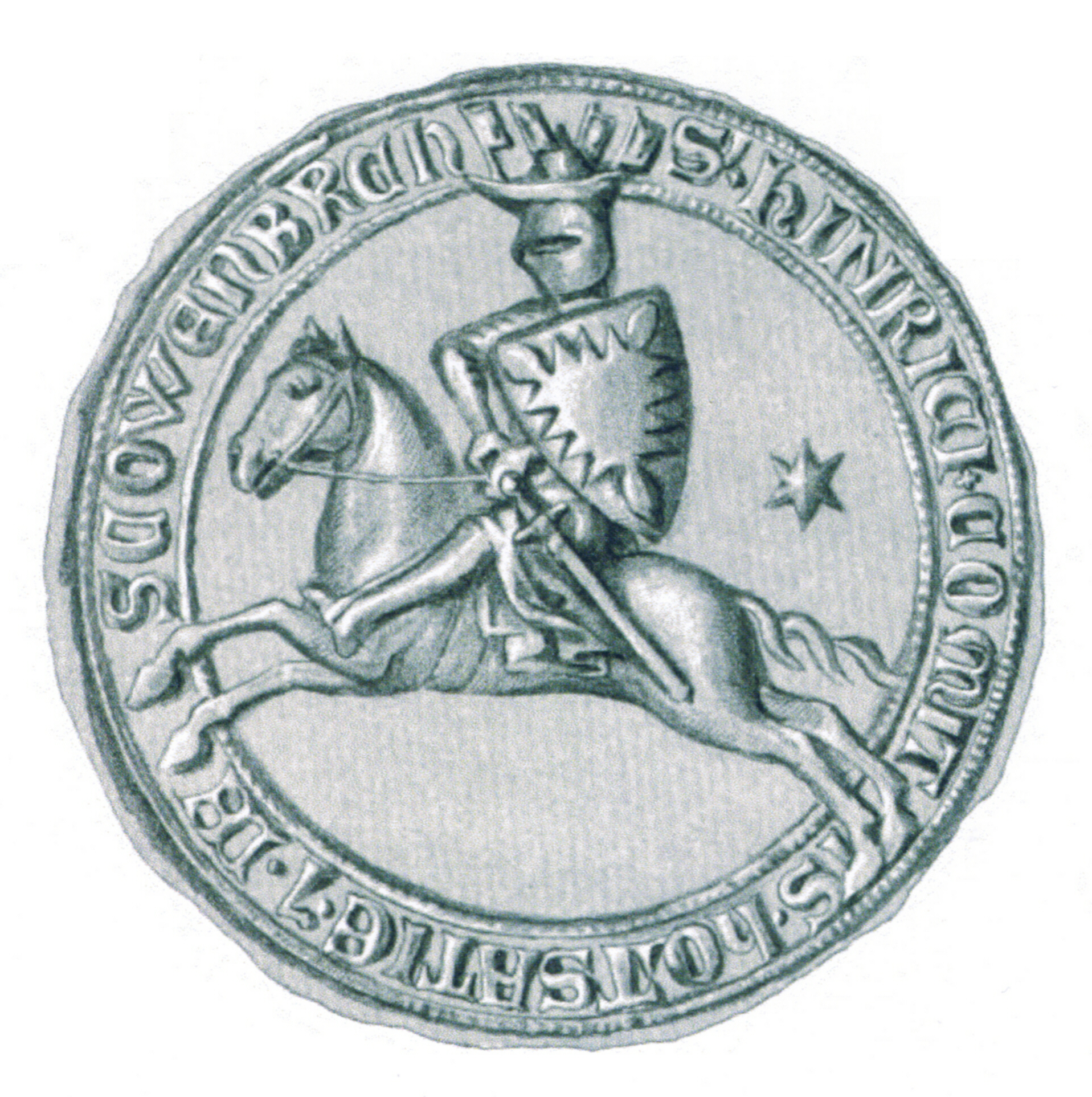
- Seal of Henry I from about 1295 to 1302
- Born: 1258
- Died: 1304 (aged 45–46)
- Noble family: House of Schaumburg
- Spouse: Heilwig of Bronckhorst
- Issue Detail: Gerhard III, Count of Holstein-Rendsburg; Adelaide of Holstein-Rendsburg; Elizabeth of Holstein-Rendsburg
- Father: Gerhard I, Count of Holstein-Itzehoe
- Mother: Elisabeth of Mecklenburg

Henry I, Count of Holstein-Rendsburg (1258–1304) was the first Count of Holstein-Rendsburg.

== Life ==
He was the son of Gerhard I, Count of Holstein-Itzehoe (d. 1290) and Elisabeth of Mecklenburg (d. c. 1280). In 1285, he was able to persuade King Eric V of Denmark to release Duke Valdemar IV of Schleswig from captivity. After the death of his father, the surviving sons divided the county among themselves. Henry was awarded the division of Rendsburg. He was constantly at war with the Dithmarschen.

Shortly before his death he introduced a toll on imported goods. Half the proceeds went to Hamburg, the other half was divided between Holstein-Schaumburg and Holstein-Rendsburg. After the Holstein-Schaumburg line died out in 1640, the Holstein half of the proceeds went to the Duchy of Holstein. After the Dukes of Holstein died out in 1768, the proceeds went to Hamburg

== Seal ==
The inscription in his seal reads: S (IGILLUM) * HINRICI * Comitis * HOLTSATIE * ET * EN * SCOWENBRCH (Seal of Henry, Count of Holstein and Schauenburg).

== Marriage and issue ==
He married in 1289 to Heilwig (1265 – after 1331), the daughter of Willem II van Bronkhorst, lord of Bronkhorst and Rekem, and of Ermgard van Randerode. The couple had the following children:

- Gerhard III (c. 1293 – 1 April 1340), married Sophia of Werle, the daughter of Nicholas II of Werle
- Adelaide (d. January 1350), married Duke Eric II of Schleswig (1288–1325)
- Giselbrecht (1290–1345) (counter-) bishop of Halberstadt
- Elizabeth (1300 – before 1340), married:
  in 1315 to Duke John II of Saxe-Lauenburg (1275–1322)
  in 1329 to King Eric of Denmark (1307–1331), divorced in 1331

Henry I of Holstein-Rendsburg House of Schaumburg Born: 1258 Died: 1304
Preceded by Gerhard I as Count of Holstein-Itzehoe	Count of Holstein-Rendsburg; 1290-1304	Succeeded by Gerhard III
