= Anders of Slagelse =

Hellig Anders
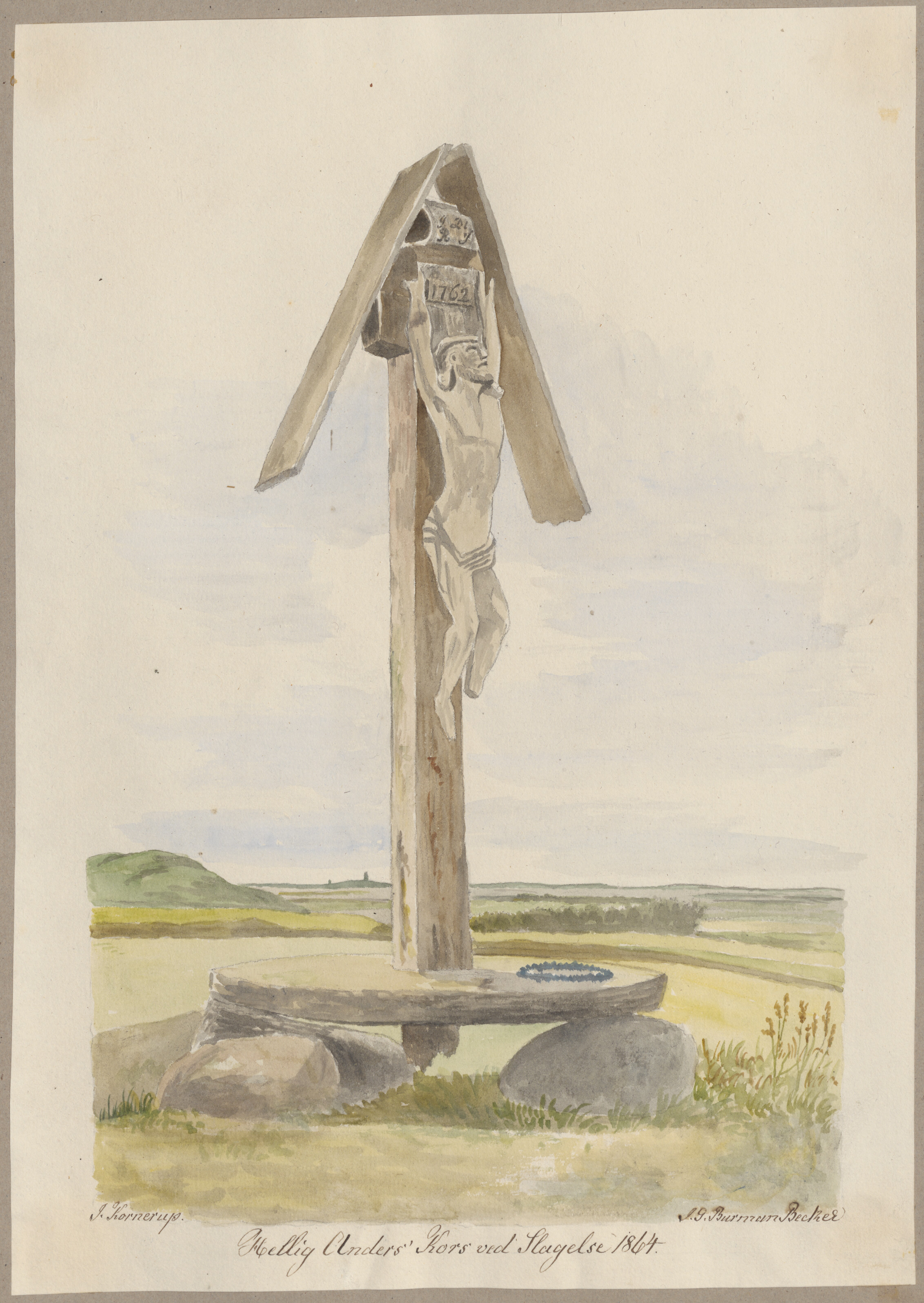
- Depiction of Saint Anders' Cross, a monument created in memory of Anders' miracle.
- Hometown: Slagelse, Denmark

Saint Anders of Slagelse (Danish: Hellig Anders; lit. 'Holy Anders') was a late 12th-century priest at Saint Peter's Church, Slagelse, Denmark. Although he was never canonized by the Roman Catholic church, he has been venerated by local practitioners even after the Reformation.

== Life ==
According to legend, while on a pilgrimage to the holy land Anders received a vision of a man on a white horse who miraculously transported him home so that he could celebrate Easter with his parishioners. The rider then transported him to shrine of Santiago de Campostella in Spain, and then to the shrine of Saint Olaf in Norway. Upon his return to Slagelse, Anders was able to heal the lame and blind through prayer.

Anders was also reportedly a good friend of King Valdemar II, and on one occasion the king is said to have offered him as much land for his parish as he could ride around on a nine-day-old foal in the time it took the king to take a bath. Taking a bath was a tedious and time-consuming task at the time, but the king doubted that Anders would be able to ride very far on the foal. Anders took up the king's offer, and he covered enough ground that a squire had to warn the king to finish his bath quickly before he lost too much land. In his haste, Anders dropped a glove near the town of Landsgrav. A spring later emerged from where his glove had fallen which was visited well into the 18th century for its alleged healing properties. After his death in 1205, Anders was buried at Saint Peter's Church.
