= Ide Pedersdatter Falk =

Ide Pedersdatter Falk (1358 – 15 August 1399), was a powerful Danish noble landholder and the founder of a convent.

Ide was the daughter of the noble Peder Eskildsøn and Ida Olufsdatter and a member of the Falk family, who previously belonged to one of the most powerful clans in Denmark. In 1370, she married noble landholder Torkild Nielsen Bing, (d. 1384), and in 1385 the noble knight and landholder Johan Snakenborg (d. 13 October 1389). She had no children who survived to adulthood, which made her a powerful landholder in Scania and gave her a dominant position within the Danish noble elite.

She is known for her will, in which she left provisions which are regarded to show solidarity with her own gender, as she donated enough money to every female to live an independent life. She left the majority of her fortune to the foundation of a convent for females she wished to have built in Gladsax in Scania. However, her wish was not respected by the bishop and the monarch, who instead founded a convent for males at Gavnö in Själland.

== See also ==
- Ingerd Jakobsdatter
