= Valdemar III of Denmark =

King of Denmark from 1326 to 1329

Valdemar III
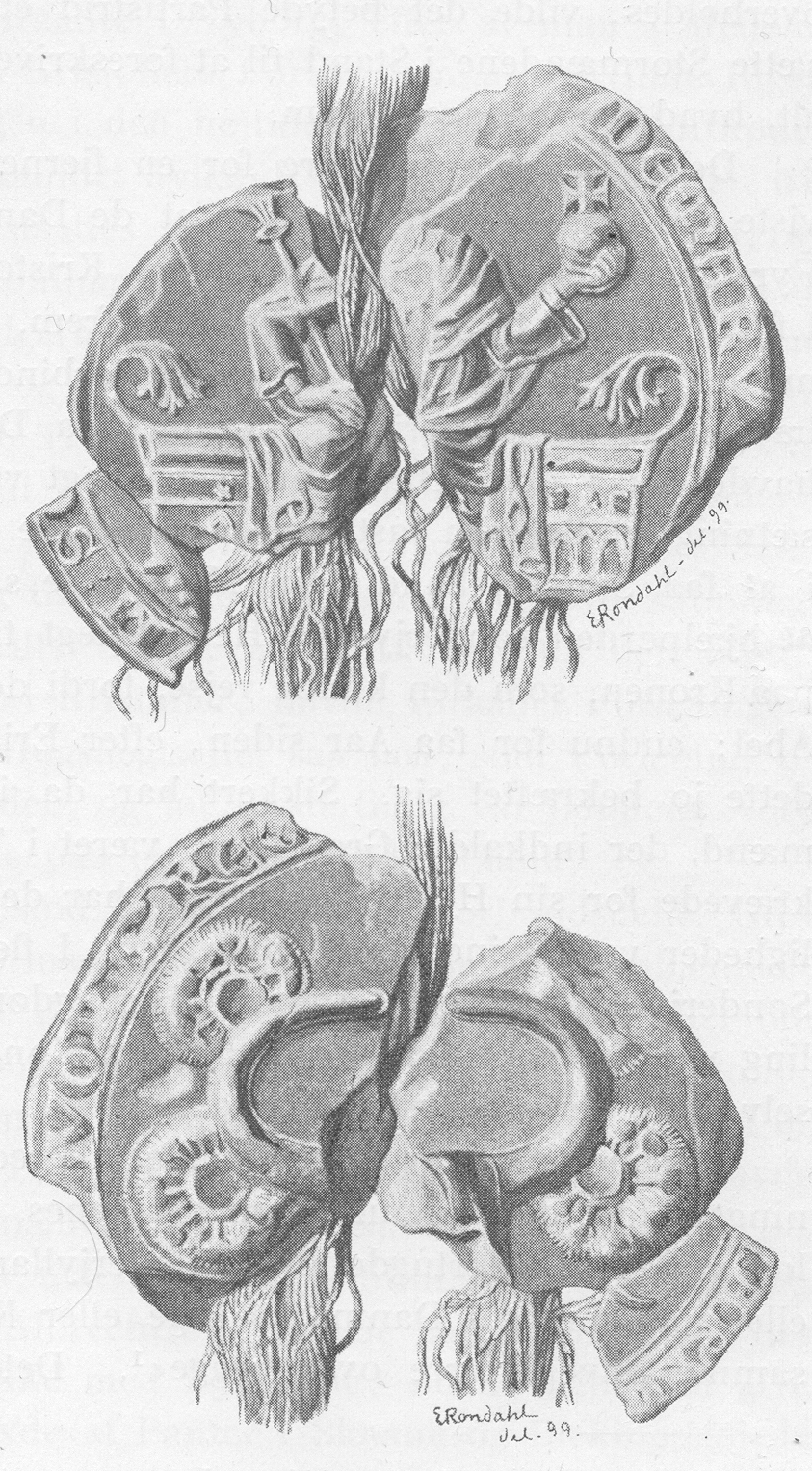
- Seal of Valdemar III

King of Denmark and the Wends
- Reign: 1326–1330
- Predecessor: Christopher II and Eric Christoffersen
- Successor: Christopher II and Eric Christoffersen
- Regent: Gerhard of Holstein

Duke of Schleswig
- Reign: 1325–1326; 1330–1364
- Predecessor: Eric II; Gerhard of Holstein
- Successor: Gerhard of Holstein; Henry
- Born: 1314
- Died: 1364 (aged 49–50)
- Consort: Richardis of Schwerin
- Issue: Valdemar, Hereditary Prince of Schleswig; Henry, Duke of Schleswig
Names
- Valdemar Eriksen
- House: Estridsen (Abelslægten line)
- Father: Eric II, Duke of Schleswig
- Mother: Adelaide of Holstein-Rendsburg

Valdemar III (1314–1364) was King of Denmark from 1326 to 1329, while he was underage; he was also Duke of Schleswig as Valdemar V in 1325–26 and from 1330 to 1364. He was a rival king set up against the unsuccessful Christopher II and was widely opposed by his subjects. His term was ended when he abdicated. Sometimes the earlier King Valdemar the Young (c. 1209–1231) is also referred to as Valdemar III.

== Biography ==
Valdemar's father was Duke Eric II of Schleswig and his mother was Adelaide, daughter of Henry I of Rendsborg. When his distant kinsman and the head of the rival royal branch Christopher II of Denmark was exiled from his kingdom, Holsteiner and Danish high nobles got to choose a new king. Their choice fell to 11-year-old Duke Valdemar V of Schleswig, who was the head of the branch descended from King Abel of Denmark. Due to his young age, his maternal uncle, the mighty Count Gerhard of Rendsborg (Gerhard III of Holstein) who also was the biggest pawnbroker of mortgaged Denmark, was appointed as the Regent and guardian (grev Gert or Den kullede Greve).

Valdemar's ascension promissory was at least as strict as Christopher's had been. There were some new stipulations, such as all royal castles in Scania should be demolished, and all nobles received the right to fortify their homesteads. The most important agreement, however, was the so-called Constitutio Valdemariana, which promised that in the future, the same person could never be both ruler of Slesvig and Denmark simultaneously. Valdemar accordingly gave up his patrimony, Schleswig, and enfeoffed it to his uncle and guardian, whereby the first Holsteinian became a Duke: Gerhard, Duke of Jutland (or Southern Jutland or Schleswig).

Denmark was now held totally by certain nobles, in practice. That was not popular among the peasants. A portion of the nobles were foreigners, and many set up new taxes. In 1328, peasants in Zealand rose in rebellion, though it was quelled, and a rebellion in Jutland followed in 1329; the Jutland rebellion had more success, but was also quelled in the end. Finally, count Gerhard gave up in the name of his king, and in 1329 Christopher II was allowed to return to the throne. Valdemar became again Duke of Schleswig.

In 1340, he gave his only sister Helvig of Schleswig to marriage with Valdemar IV, the new king of Denmark. During the rest of his rule he led a changeable policy towards Denmark by which war alternated with co-operation.

Valdemar died in 1364. He was married to Richardis of Schwerin (died 1384), daughter of Count Günzelin VI of Schwerin-Wittenburg. They had two sons, Valdemar (1338–1360) and Henry (1342–1375). Henry succeeded as Duke of Schleswig when his father died.

Valdemar III of Denmark Abelslægten Cadet branch of the House of Estridsen Born: 1314 Died: 1364
Regnal titles
Preceded by Eric II	Duke of Schleswig as Valdemar V 1325–1326	Succeeded by Gerard I
Preceded by Christopher II	King of Denmark as Valdemar III; 1326–1329	Succeeded by Christopher II and Eric
Preceded by Christopher II	Duke of Estonia as Valdemar II; 1326–1329	Succeeded by Canute II and Ingeborg of Norway
Preceded by Gerard I	Duke of Schleswig as Valdemar V 1330–1364	Succeeded by Henry
Preceded by Otto I	Duke of Estonia as Valdemar II; 1338-1340	Succeeded by Valdemar III
