= Gerhard III of Holstein-Rendsburg =

Count of Holstein-Rendsburg

Gerhard III
- Count of Holstein-Rendsburg
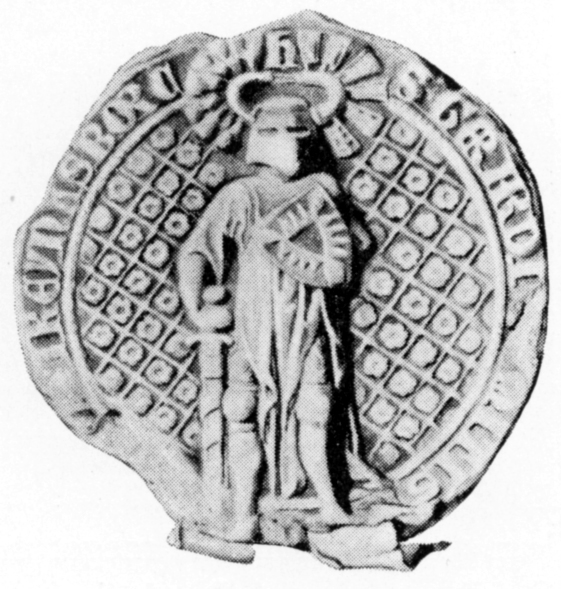
- Seal of Count Gerhard III
- Born: c. 1292
- Died: 1 April 1340; Randers
- Noble family: Schaumburg
- Spouse: Sophia of Werle
- Issue Detail: Henry II, Count of Holstein-Rendsburg; Nicholas, Count of Holstein-Rendsburg
- Father: Henry I, Count of Holstein-Rendsburg
- Mother: Heilwig of Bronckhorst

Gerhard III of Holstein-Rendsburg (c. 1292 – 1 April 1340), sometimes called Gerhard the Great, and in Denmark also known as Count Gert or den kullede greve ("the bald count"), was a German prince from the Schauenburg family who ruled Holstein-Rendsburg and a large part of Denmark during the interregnum of 1332–40.

His father was Henry I, Count of Holstein-Rendsburg (c. 1258 – 5 August 1304). Gerhard inherited his part of the county of Holstein as a boy. While he was a young man, he enlarged his inheritance by outmanoeuvring his relatives and by his conquest of other parts of Holstein. These actions made him a powerful local prince. In these years, he was also employed as a paid condottiere for neighbouring kings, including King Eric VI of Denmark. He often partnered with his Holstein cousin, Count John III, Count of Holstein-Plön.

In 1325 Gerhard began his career in the North by taking over the guardianship for his minor nephew Duke Valdemar of Schleswig. This position made him a possible ally of the dissatisfied Danish magnates and 1326 he dethroned King Christopher II together with the Danish rebels. From then until his death, he had a major influence on Danish politics. He placed his nephew, Valdemar, on the Danish throne, became regent of Denmark, and at the same time secured the separation of Schleswig from Denmark through the so-called Constitutio Valdemariana, which formed the basis for the long-standing German influence on South Jutland. His inability to bring peace and order led to rebellions and a conflict with Count Johan. As a result, in 1329 Gerhard replaced Valdemar with Christopher II as the puppet king. After the death of Christopher in 1332, Gerhard effectively took over as ruler of Denmark.

From 1332 to 1340, Count Gerhard was the real ruler of what remained of Denmark, being the lord of both Jutland and Funen and leaving the rest of the country to Johan. However, his position was insecure because he had numerous creditors who had financed his armies and therefore were able to influence him. The result was a growing opposition against the foreign rule within the Danish gentry that had earlier supported Gerhard. Peasant rebellions and lawlessness at sea led to increasing chaos, and Gerhard was put under pressure from the neighbouring German states, which now supported Christopher's son, Valdemar (afterwards to be king Valdemar IV). Gerhard seemed to have prepared to compromise in return for his outstanding debts being dealt with, but before a solution was reached in the spring of 1340 he started a new campaign against rebels in North Jutland. During the campaign, he was slain in the town of Randers by the Danish squire Niels Ebbesen, who had entered his bedroom along with some of his men.

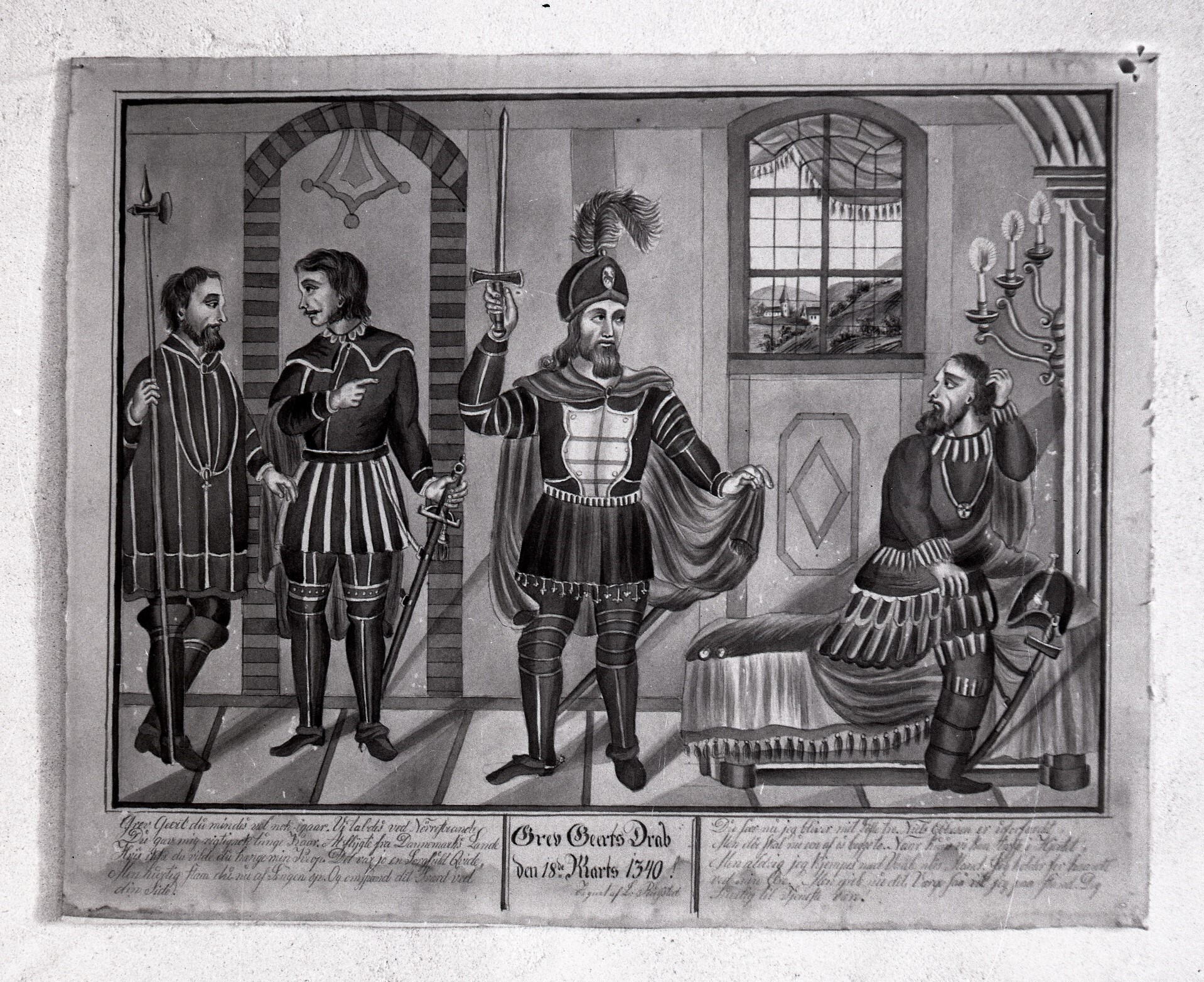
The murder of Count Gert.

His death meant the end of Holstein rule in Denmark. Gerhard's two sons gave up their right to Gerhard's titles in Denmark, and Valdemar IV was subsequently placed on the Danish throne.

Because of his influential role in Danish politics, Gerhard has been the subject of controversy as to his legacy. In Denmark he is traditionally regarded as a scoundrel and a “German tyrant” and his murder has been viewed as one of the highlights of Danish history, having inspired Danish poets and authors as late as during the German occupation of Denmark 1940–1945. In the Ditmarshes (Dithmarschen) which he ravaged, he also seems to be viewed unfavourably. In Holstein, however, he has been regarded as a national hero. From contemporary sources he appears to have been energetic and a brutal warrior, yet deeply religious.

== Marriage and issue ==
Gerhard III married Sophia of Werle, the daughter of Nicholas II of Werle and Richeza, the daughter of Eric V of Denmark; they had the following children:

- Henry II, Count of Holstein-Rendsburg (c. 1317–1384 or later)
- Nicholas, Count of Holstein-Rendsburg (c. 1321–1397), married Elisabeth, daughter of William II, Duke of Brunswick-Lüneburg
- Adolphus (by 1330)
- Elisabeth (by 1340–1402), prince-abbess of Elten Imperial Abbey

Gerhard the Great House of Schaumburg Born: ca. 1292 Died: 1 April 1340
German nobility
Preceded by Henry I	Count of Schauenburg and Holstein-Rendsburg; 1304–1340	Succeeded by Henry II
Danish nobility
Preceded by Valdemar V	Duke of Schleswig; 1326–1330	Succeeded by Valdemar V
Preceded by Christopher II as King of Denmark	Regent of Denmark; 1332–1340	Succeeded by Valdemar IV as King of Denmark
