= Stig Andersen Hvide =

Danish nobleman

Stig Andersen Hvide (died December 1293) was a Danish nobleman and magnate, known as the leading man among the outlaws after the murder of King Eric V of Denmark. In Danish tradition, he is known as Marsk Stig.

== Biography ==
In spite of his surname, he does not seem to have been a member of the Hvide clan but rather seems to have married into it. Of his personal life not much is known but from the 1270s he seems to have been Denmark’s leading general and minister of war (marsk). During the next years he was apparently a leading man of the opposition against the growing power of King Eric V. He was probably one of the group supporting the introduction of the haandfæstning of 1282, reflecting the growing strength of the Danish nobility.

After the regicide of King Eric V in November 1286, Marsk Stig was forced to leave office. He and many other magnates and vassals were outlawed as the men behind the king’s death in spite of their protests. Stig Andersen then settled at the island of Hjelm in Kattegat which he made a pirate’s nest and from which he ravaged the Danish coasts. He also formed a working alliance with the king of Norway. He died on his island without having obtained rehabilitation from the Danish government.

== Legacy ==
To posterity Stig Andersen assumed still mightier dimensions. He was often regarded the man behind the regicide and already in his own time ballads and sages were flourishing, a tradition continued by romantic poets and writers. According to a very popular version he became a regicide in order to revenge his dishonour because the king had seduced his wife some years before. Later historians in general have regarded him as the victim of a political miscarriage of justice. Some of them look upon him as a kind of a political idealist perhaps even trying to create parliamentarian conditions in Denmark – a theory just as impossible to prove.

Recent excavation on the island of Samsø by archaeologists of the National Museum of Denmark revealed acts of piracy attributed to Marsk Stig. New archaeological findings on Hjelm also show that he had a regular coiner workshop. The pirates were accused of putting counterfeit coins into circulation to cripple the Danish economy.

== Literature and popular culture ==
Danish fictive treatments of Marsk Stig include:

- Ebbe Kløvedal Reich: Festen for Cæcilie (1979)
- Karen Blixen: Fra det gamle Danmark (Vintereventyr) (1942)
- B. S. Ingemann: Erik Menveds Barndom (English: The Childhood of Erik VI Menved) (1828)

The operas Marsk Stig (Stig Hvide) by Norwegian composer Ole Olsen (1872-76) and Drot og marsk (King and Marshal) by Danish composer Peter Heise (1878), as well as the play Marsk Stig by Carsten Hauch (1850), also revolve around the subject.

Marsk Stig is mentioned as part of the historic background of Viborg in M.R.James' ghost story "number 13".

== Other sources ==
- Dansk Biografisk Leksikon, vol. 6, (Copenhagen, 1980) (in Danish)
- Brask, Aage Tordrup og Marsk Stigs slægt fra stormandsorg til husmandsbrug (Borgens forlag Copenhagen: 1953) (in Danish)
- Grundtvig, Svend Marsk Stig: Dansk Folkevise Fra 13de Aarhundrede (1861) (in Danish)
