= Jacob Nielsen, Count of Halland =

14th-century Danish nobleman (died ~1309)

Jacob Nielsen (died about 1309) was count of Northern Halland and a great-grandson of Valdemar II of Denmark. His father (Niels Nielsen) and grandfather (Niels Valdemarsen) had both held Halland as a county before him. Jacob received Halland in 1283, but switched allegiance to the King of Norway two years later and was declared an outlaw in 1287 after the murder of Eric V of Denmark.

In Halland, Jacob built the fortresses of Hunehals and later Varberg Fortress. Jacob's position weakened after the Norwegian king started to lose interest in the conflict with Denmark, and in 1305, he was forced to relinquish Halland to Haakon V of Norway, who granted it to his own son-in-law, the Swedish duke Erik Magnusson.

== Bibliography ==
- Kr[istian] Erslev, "Jacob, Greve af Nørrehalland", Dansk biografisk leksikon, VIII. Bind. Holst - Juul, 1894, p 336 f.
