= Postage stamps and postal history of Bergedorf =

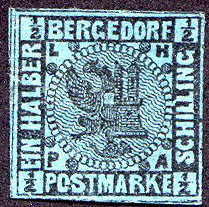
Bergedorf stamp with a value of ½ Schilling

Bergedorf's postal authority issued only five stamps between 1861 and 1867. Bergedorf is the smallest field of German stamp collecting.

== Historical development ==
Due to its good geographic location, Bergedorf and environs (the Bi-Urban Condominium of the sovereign city states of Lübeck and Hamburg to be precise) had already received postal services from the Hanseatic league early on. The city's postal connections to neighbouring Hamburg were especially well developed at an early stage.

Since the 1420 Treaty of Perleberg, Bergedorf with Geesthacht and the Vierlande municipalities (Altengamme, Curslack, Kirchwerder and Neuengamme) had belonged to both of the Hanseatic cities of Hamburg and Lübeck, therefore named Beiderstädtischer Besitz (Bi-Urban Condominium). Because the condominium belonged to both cities, the curious condition arose where the condominium's post could not be administered by either Hamburg or Lübeck. Therefore, the condominium formed its own tiny autonomous postal jurisdiction. Several other principalities also established postal departments in the condominium's capital Bergedorf city. In 1746, Electoral Hanover set up its own postal department in Bergedorf city, which lasted as Royal Hanoverian post until 1846. In 1785, the dynasty of Thurn und Taxis succeeded Hanover and established its own postal department, which was not closed until 1851. In 1839, Prussia finally opened a postal department in Bergedorf city as well.

From 1806 to 1813, the condominium was first occupied, and as of 1811 annexed by the First French Empire during the Napoleonic Wars. During this time, the postal system was taken over by the Imperial French Post.

Finally on 1 April 1847, the Beiderstädtisches Postamt (Bi-Urban Mail) or Lübeck-Hamburgisches Postamt (Postal Department of Lübeck and Hamburg) emerged from the Prussian postal department. In the following years, this arrangement was extended. In 1856, further departments opened in the condominial territory, namely in the Geesthacht exclave (since 1937 no part of the region any more) and in Kirchwerder.

From 1855 to 1856, the Bi-Urban Mail signed several postal agreements modelled on the German-Austrian Postal Treaty, including agreements with Prussia and Mecklenburg-Schwerin.

After Hamburg and Lübeck had already issued their first stamps in 1859, Bergedorf followed in 1861. However, Hamburg's stamps were officially sold beside those from the Bi-Urban Mail at the post office counters.

== Stamp issues by the Bergedorf Bi-Urban Mail ==
On 1 November 1861, five definitive stamps with values of ½, 1, 1½, 3, and 4 Hamburg Schillings (16 schillings made up 1 Hamburg mark) were issued in Bergedorf. These five values could satisfy the postal tariffs for all distance and weight needs of the time. At that time (1863), only 12,468 people lived in the whole postal region. The imperforated definitive stamps were printed when required and were valid until 31 December 1867. The stamps are square in shape. Besides the value, the country's name and the term "Postmarke", the centre of each stamp depicted one half of the coat of arms of each of Hamburg and Lübeck.

The Bergedorf stamp series is often referred to as a "growing series" because each value is a little bit larger than its predecessor. Thus, the 4 Schilling value looks twice as large as the ½ Schilling value. Together with the different paper colours of the values, the sizing helped to distinguish between the various stamps.

== Unification with Hamburg ==
Effective 1 January 1868, the Free and Hanseatic city of Hamburg bought Lübeck's share in the Bi-Urban Condominium which passed completely into the former's ownership. On this date, the joint entry into the North German Confederation (the predecessor of the 1871 German Empire) took place. Since that time, the postal history of Bergedorf shares that of the North German Confederation. Bergedorf's five stamps were only valid until that day.

== Sources ==
- Karl Knauer: Bergedorfer Postgeschichte. 330 pages, 1961
