= Fünfhausen =

- Part of Hamburg
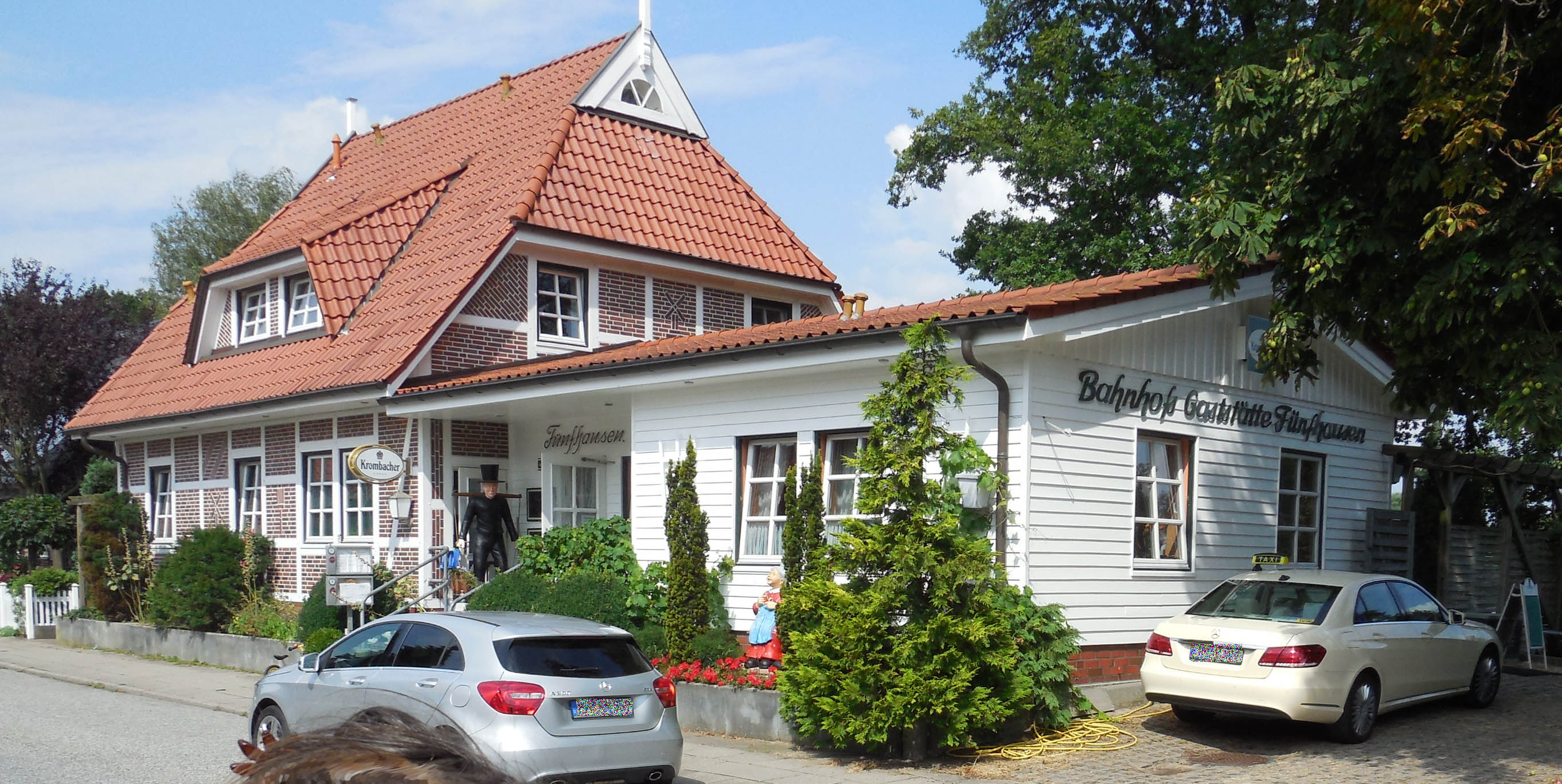
- Former train station
- Interactive map of Fünfhausen
- Location within Germany Location within Hamburg
- Coordinates: 53°26′39″N 10°7′40″E
- Country: Germany
- State: Hamburg
- City: Hamburg
- Borough: Bergedorf
- Time zone: UTC+01:00 (CET)
  - Summer (DST): UTC+02:00 (CEST)
- Dialling codes: 040
- Vehicle registration: HH

Fünfhausen (German pronunciation: [fʏnfˈhaʊzn̩]) is a place in Hamburg, Germany. It is a part of the borough Bergedorf and the quarter Kirchwerder.

== History ==
During World War II, 50 wooden homes were built for families which were affected by the bombing in the city. At that time the people from Bergedorf used to call Fünfhausen Kistendorf (box village) because of the cubic shaped houses.

In October 1954 Fünfhausen was visited by the German president Theodor Heuss.

== Geography ==
Fünfhausen is located in the quarter Kirchwerder in Hamburg. West of Fünfhausen is the quarter Ochsenwerder. In the center is the Sandbrack Lake and nearby is the Hohendeicher Lake and the Elbe river. North of it is the Gose Elbe.

The main streets are Durchdeich, Ochsenwerder Landscheideweg and Süderquerweg.

== Transportation ==
Fünfhausen has no S-Bahn or U-Bahn station. However several bus lines pass through the neighborhood. The lines 122, 124, 127, 222, 224, and 422 connect Fünfhausen to the central station / ZOB and Bergedorf station. The lines 222 and 422 are special lines which operate before and after school hours. The largest bus station is Fünfhausen (Durchdeich).

== Fünfhausen in the borough Harburg ==
There is a second much smaller place in Hamburg which is called Fünfhausen in the borough Harburg in the district Neuland. It is located at the Elbe and borders Seevetal in Lower Saxony.

Coordinates for Fünfhausen in Harburg: 53° 27′ 46″ N, 10° 2′ 53″ E
