= Curslack =

- Quarter of Hamburg
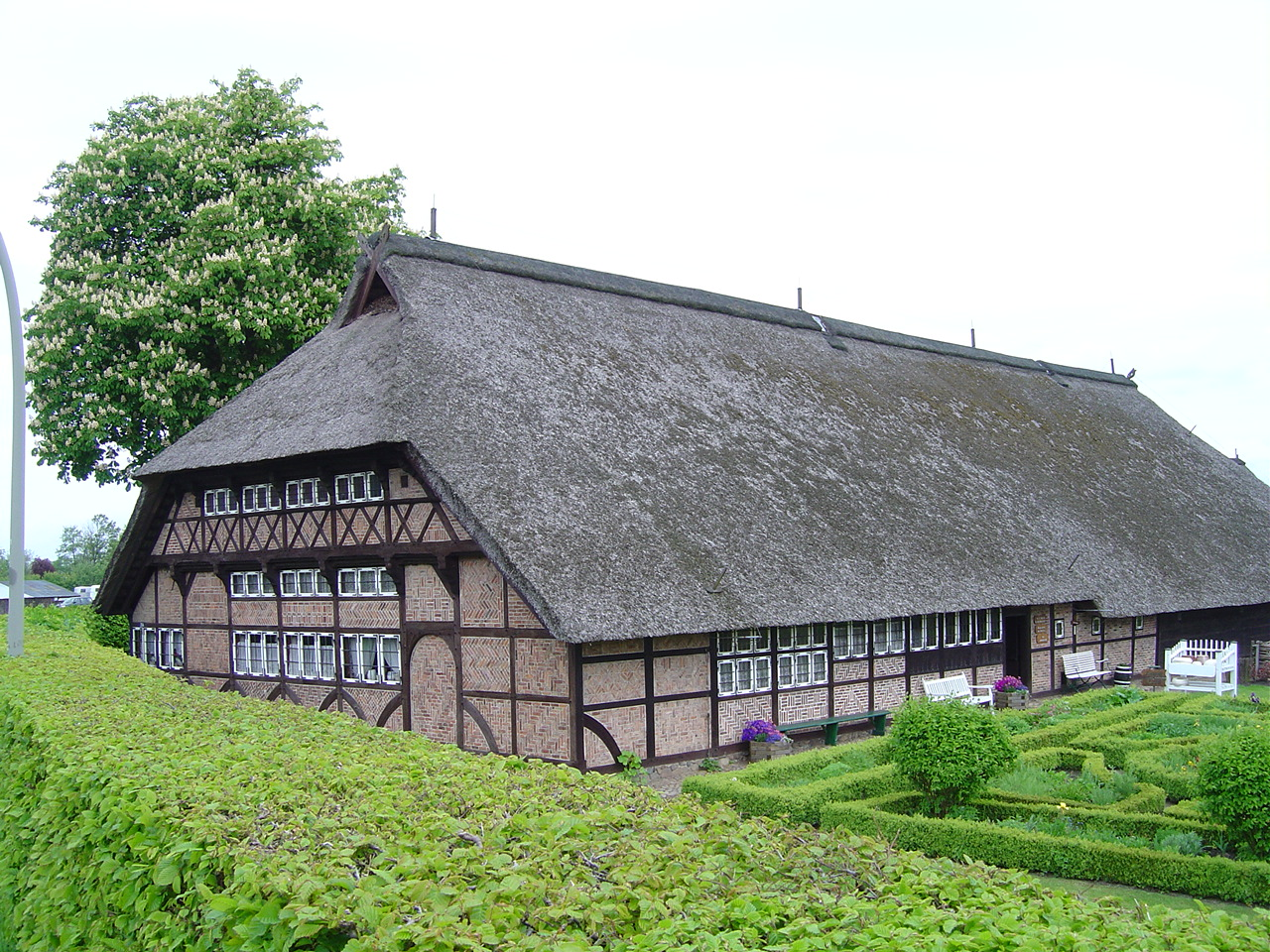
- The Rieckhaus Museum

- Location of Curslack in Hamburg
- Interactive map of Curslack
- Location within Germany Location within Hamburg
- Coordinates: 53.45866°N 10.21575°E
- Country: Germany
- State: Hamburg
- City: Hamburg
- Borough: Hamburg-Bergedorf

Area
  - Total: 7.1 km^{2} (2.7 sq mi)

Population (2024-12-31)
  - Total: 4,269
  - Density: 600/km^{2} (1,600/sq mi)
- Time zone: UTC+01:00 (CET)
  - Summer (DST): UTC+02:00 (CEST)
- Dialling codes: 040
- Vehicle registration: HH

Curslack (German pronunciation: [ˈkʊʁslak]) is a quarter of Hamburg, Germany, in the borough of Bergedorf. It is located in the eastern part of the borough, which lies in the southeast of Hamburg.

== Name ==
The name derives from Cuwerslake, meaning low swampland, which is heavily exposed to flowing water. In Low German kuren means to seep and a Lake means a wet meadow. The area had been flooded regularly until the lock of Tatenberger Schleuse was built from 1949 to 1952.

== Geography ==
Curslack borders the quarters of Bergedorf, Altengamme, Neuengamme and Allermöhe.

== History ==
Curslack is part of the Vierlande area in Hamburg. The village was first recorded in 1188, when it formed a "dyke association" with neighboring Altengamme. In 1420 Curslack had been conquered by Hamburg and Lübeck. The village was under the administration of both cities (beiderstädtische Verwaltung) until 1868.

The church of St. John was first recorded in 1306. The actual church was built from 1599 to 1603. Curslack became part of Hamburg with the Greater Hamburg Act in 1937.

State owned Hamburg Wasser operates a waterworks in Curslack since 1928. Therefore, Curslack along with Altengamme were declared a "water protection zone" in 1997.

== Politics ==
These are the results of Curslack in the Hamburg state election:

Election	SPD	Greens	CDU	AfD	Left	FDP	Others
2020	39,4 %	19,7 %	17,9 %	6,9 %	5,2 %	4,8 %	6,1 %
2015	50,8 %	11,4 %	18,9 %	6,1 %	4,2 %	6,1 %	3,6 %
2011	44,5 %	10,3 %	29,4 %	–	3,7 %	6,8 %	5,3 %
2008	27,1 %	7,7 %	55,5 %	–	3,5 %	4,0 %	2,3 %

== Gallery ==
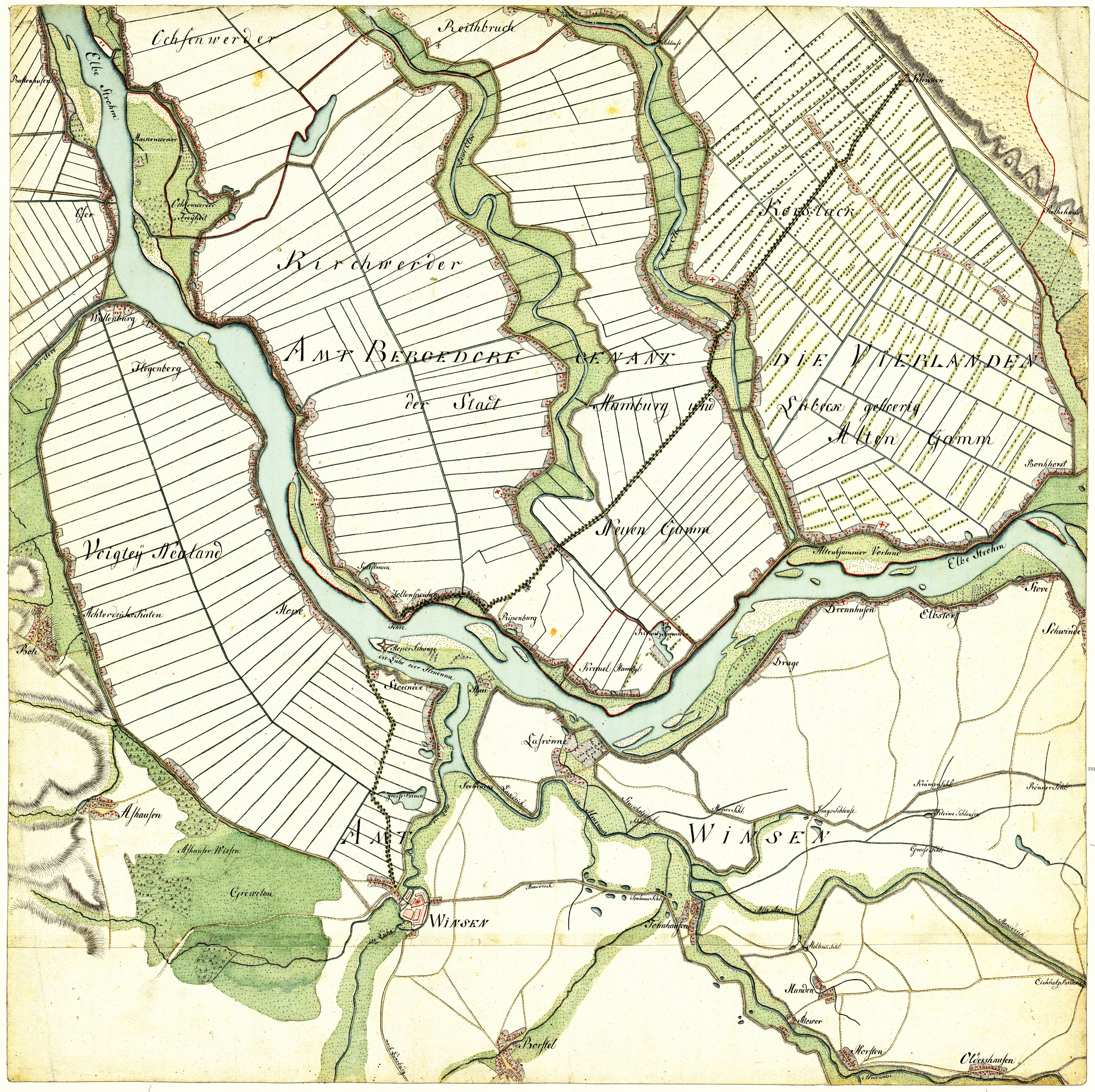
The area of Curslack in 1790

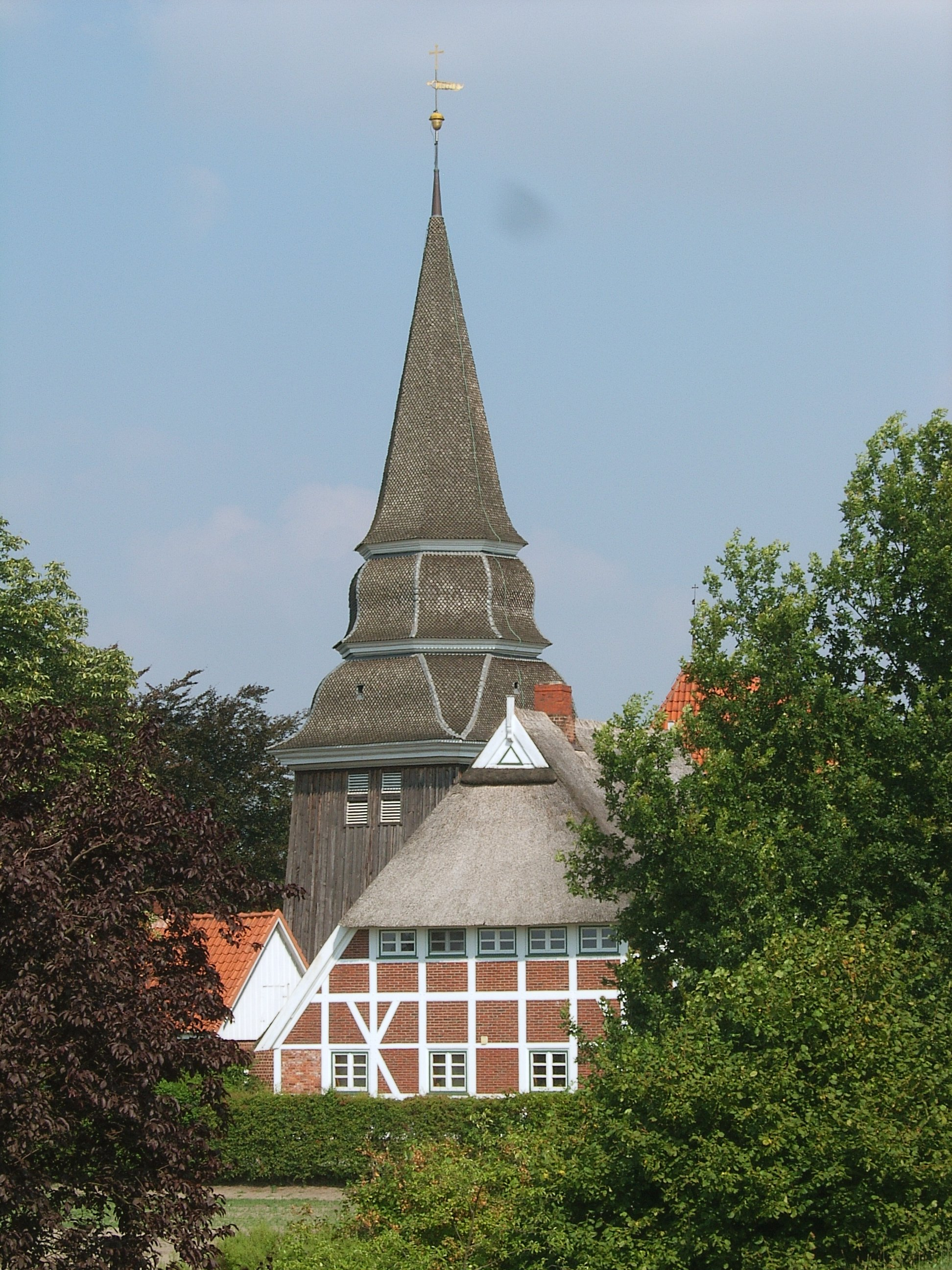
The Church of St. John Curslack, built from 1599 to 1603. An earlier church building at this place was first recorded in 1306
