= Reitbrook =

- Quarter of Hamburg
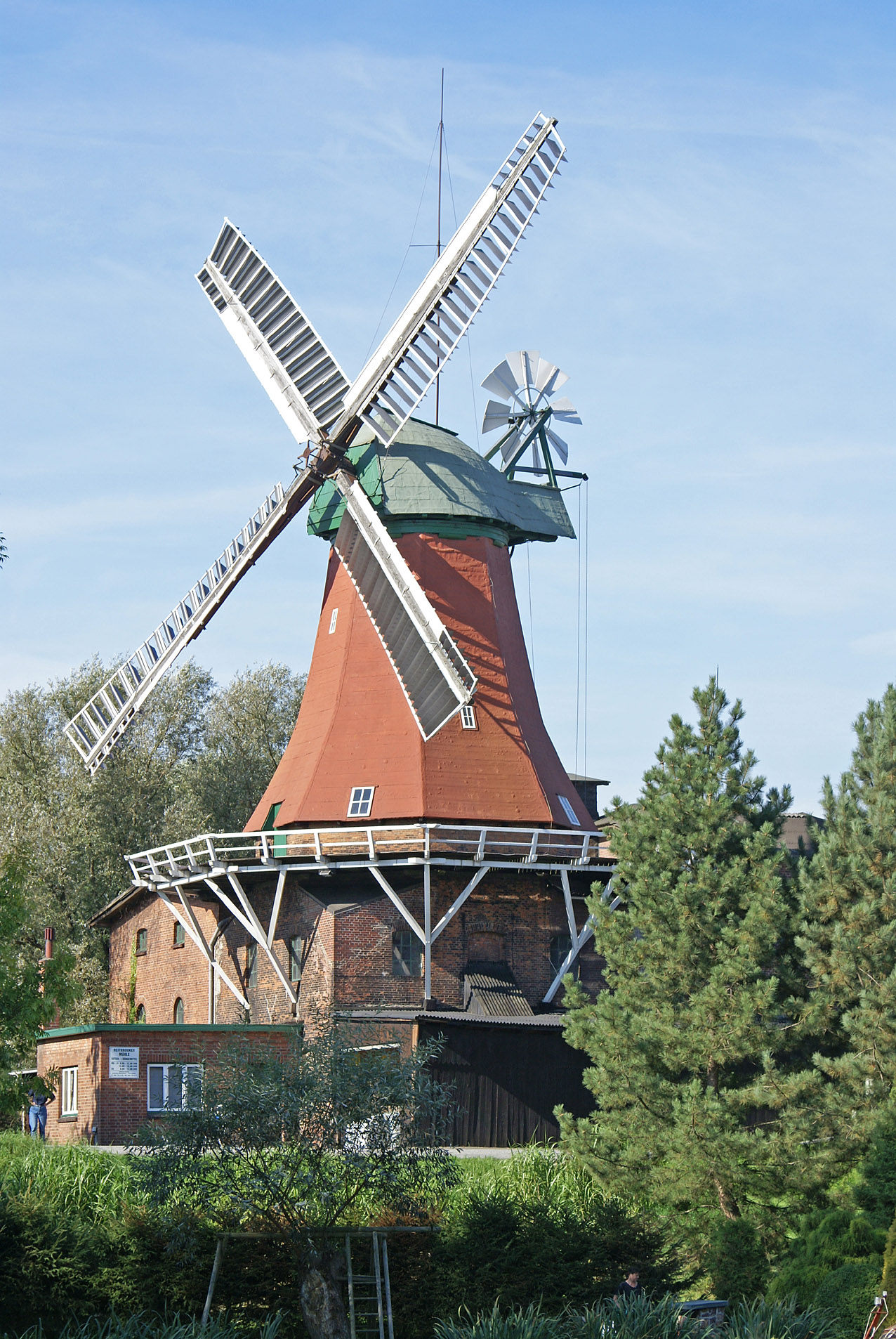
- Reitbrook Windmill
- Interactive map of Reitbrook
- Location within Germany Location within Hamburg
- Coordinates: 53°28′0″N 10°9′0″E
- Country: Germany
- State: Hamburg
- City: Hamburg
- Borough: Bergedorf

Area
  - Total: 6.9 km^{2} (2.7 sq mi)

Population (2024-12-31)
  - Total: 497
  - Density: 72/km^{2} (190/sq mi)
- Time zone: UTC+01:00 (CET)
  - Summer (DST): UTC+02:00 (CEST)
- Dialling codes: 040
- Vehicle registration: HH

Reitbrook (German pronunciation: [ˈʁaɪtbʁoːk]) is a quarter of Hamburg, Germany, in the borough of Bergedorf. It has a population of only 522 people (2020). It is popular for its wind mill.

== Geography ==
Reitbrook borders the quarter Kirchwerder, Ochsenwerder, Neuengamme and Allermöhe. It is located at the Dove Elbe.

== Politics ==
These are the results of Reitbrook (counted together with Allermöhe, Billwerder, Moorfleet, Tatenberg, and Spadenland in 2025) in the Hamburg state election:

State Election	SPD	CDU	Greens	AfD	Left	FDP	Others
2025	29,3 %	33,1 %	8,5 %	13,2 %	8,3 %	1,7 %	5,9 %
2020	39,0 %	23,3 %	15,3 %	9,5 %	4,7 %	3,4 %	4,8 %
2015	43,8 %	31,3 %	6,2 %	7,5 %	4,1 %	5,6 %	1,5 %
2011	41,5 %	37,0 %	8,1 %	–	3,1 %	5,7 %	4,7 %
2008	19,9 %	65,5 %	6,0 %	–	1,9 %	3,7 %	3,0 %

== People from Reitbrook ==
• Alfred Lichtwark (* 14. November 1852; † 13. January 1914 in Hamburg) his father was the owner of the Reitbrook Mill.
