= Hamburg-Bergedorf (disambiguation) =

Bergedorf, or Hamburg-Bergedorf, is a borough of the German city of Hamburg.

Hamburg-Bergedorf may also refer to:

- Bergedorf (quarter), a district within Bergedorf
- Hamburg-Bergedorf – Harburg, an electoral district
- Hamburg-Bergedorf station, a railway station
- Hamburg-Bergedorf Railway Company, a railway company
- Hamburg-Bergedorf Observatory, an astronomical observatory
