= Kirchwerder =

- Quarter of Hamburg
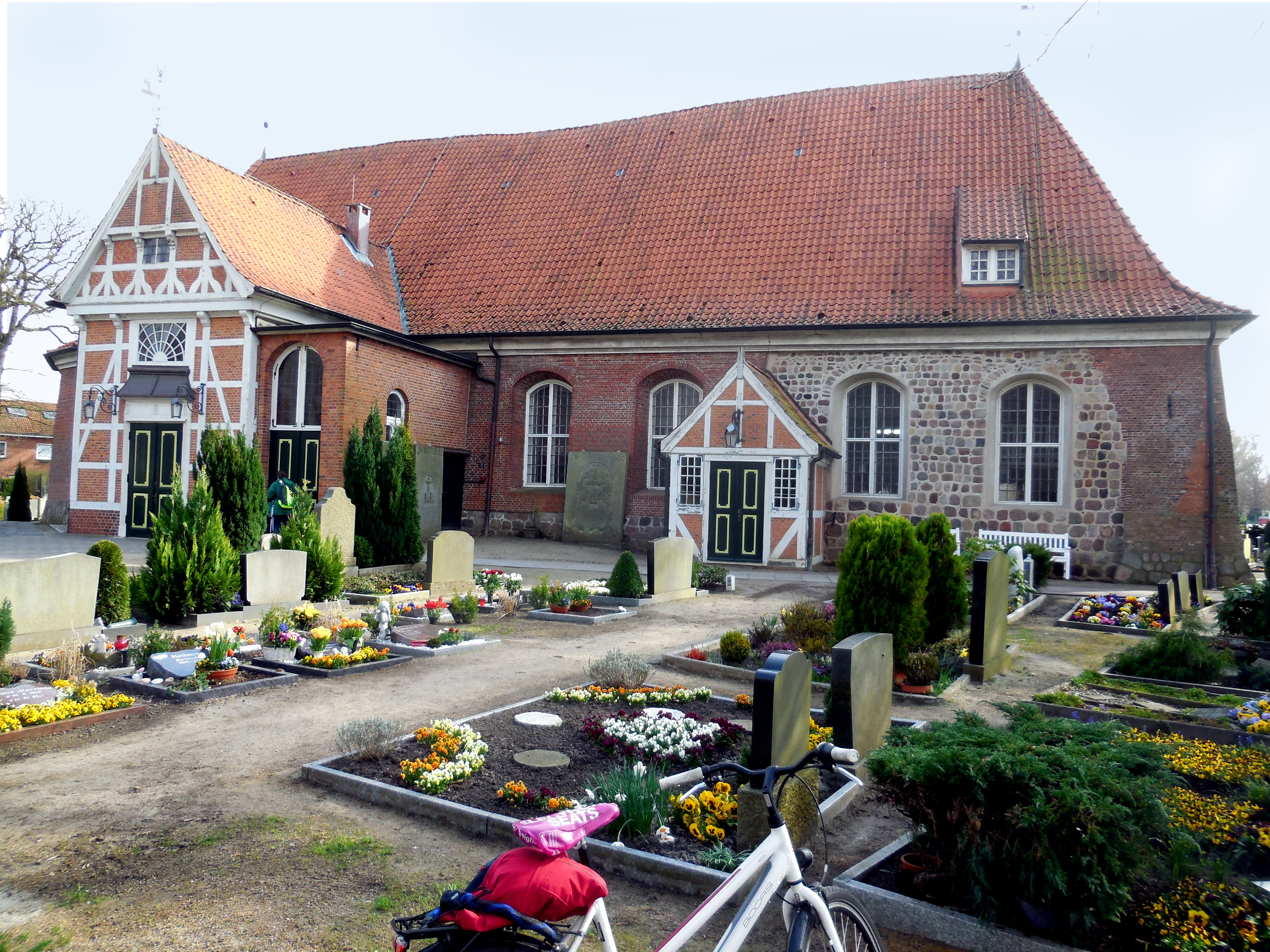
- Church of Saint Severin
- Interactive map of Kirchwerder
- Location within Germany Location within Hamburg
- Coordinates: 53°25′11″N 10°12′6″E
- Country: Germany
- State: Hamburg
- City: Hamburg
- Borough: Bergedorf

Area
  - Total: 32.3 km^{2} (12.5 sq mi)

Population (2024-12-31)
  - Total: 10,398
  - Density: 322/km^{2} (834/sq mi)
- Time zone: UTC+01:00 (CET)
  - Summer (DST): UTC+02:00 (CEST)
- Dialling codes: 040
- Vehicle registration: HH

Kirchwerder (German pronunciation: [kɪʁçˈvɛʁdɐ]) is a quarter of Hamburg, Germany, in the borough of Bergedorf. It is located on the southeast border of Hamburg at the Elbe river.

== Geography ==
Kirchwerder is a part of the Vierlande and is located at the Elbe river. Therefore it is highly endangered by storm floods.

Kircherwerder borders the quarters Ochsenwerder, Reitbrook and Neuengamme. In the south is Harburg in Lower Saxony. The place Fünfhausen is located in the west of Kirchwerder. Zollenspieker is at the Elbe river.

== Politics ==
These are the results of Kirchwerder in the Hamburg state election:

State Election	SPD	CDU	Greens	AfD	FDP	Left	Others
2025	32,5 %	34,8 %	8,2 %	11,9 %	1,8 %	5,2 %	5,8 %
2020	40,6 %	23,6 %	13,2 %	8,3 %	4,5 %	4,1 %	5,7 %
2015	48,7 %	23,5 %	7,3 %	6,6 %	6,5 %	4,5 %	2,9 %
2011	44,2 %	35,4 %	6,6 %	–	6,4 %	3,0 %	4,4 %
2008	24,3 %	59,7 %	5,2 %	–	4,7 %	3,3 %	2,9 %
2004	22,5 %	63,1 %	6,0 %	–	3,2 %	–	5,2 %

== Transport ==
Kirchwerder has no S-Bahn or U-Bahn station. However it has a large bus system.
