= Vierlande =

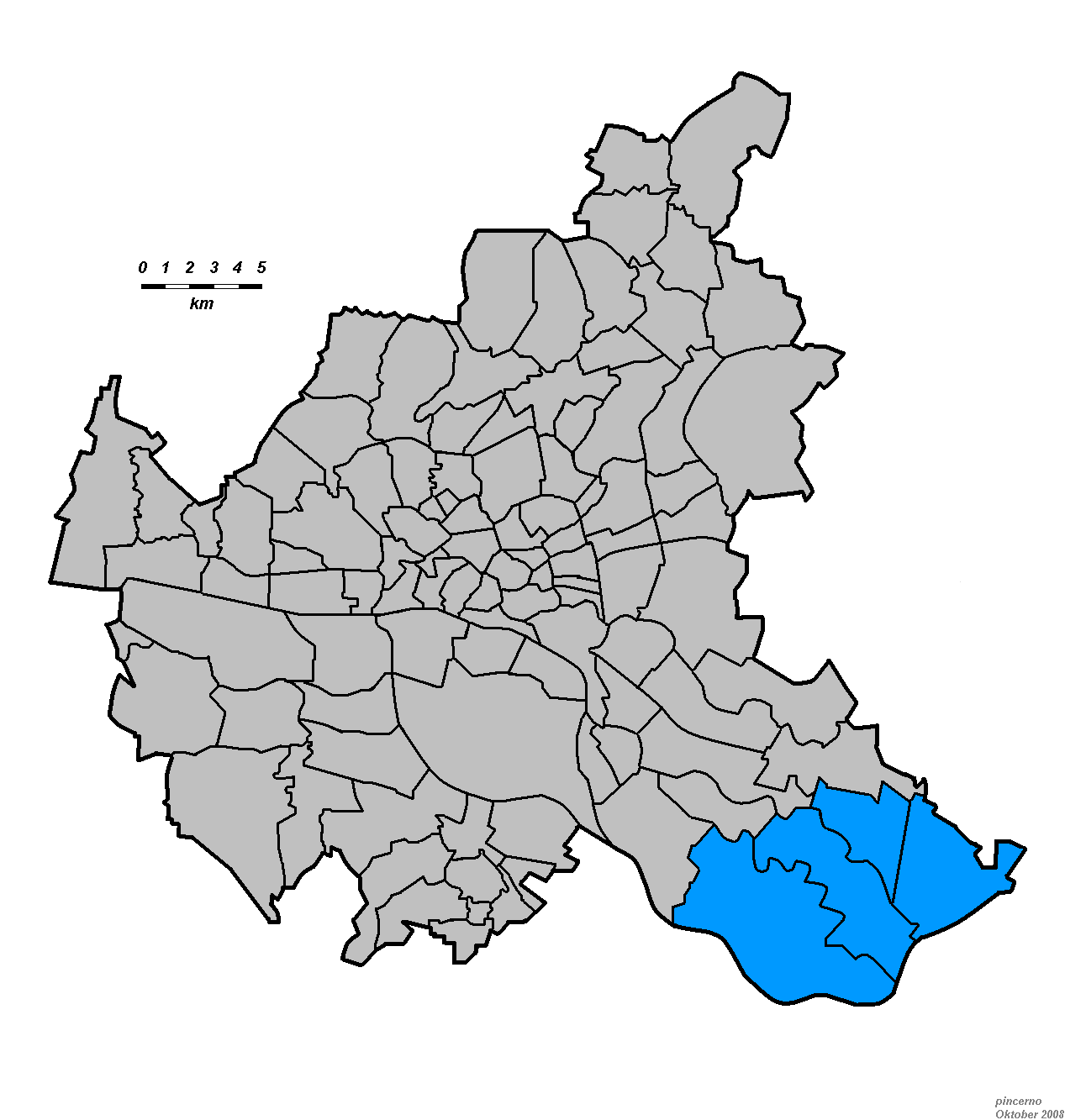
Location of the Vierlande in Hamburg
Base data for Vierlande
Country:	Germany
Bundesland:	Hamburg
Bezirk:	Bergedorf

Vierlande (German pronunciation: [ˈfiːɐ̯landə]) is the name given to a roughly 77-square kilometre region in the Hamburg district of Bergedorf which has a population of 18,419 and comprises four quarters of the city.

Its name goes back to the year 1556 and refers to the four church parishes of Curslack, Kirchwerder, Neuengamme and Altengamme which are identical with their modern-day quarters.

== Geography ==
The Vierlande consists of former river islands in the urstromtal of the Elbe.

== History ==
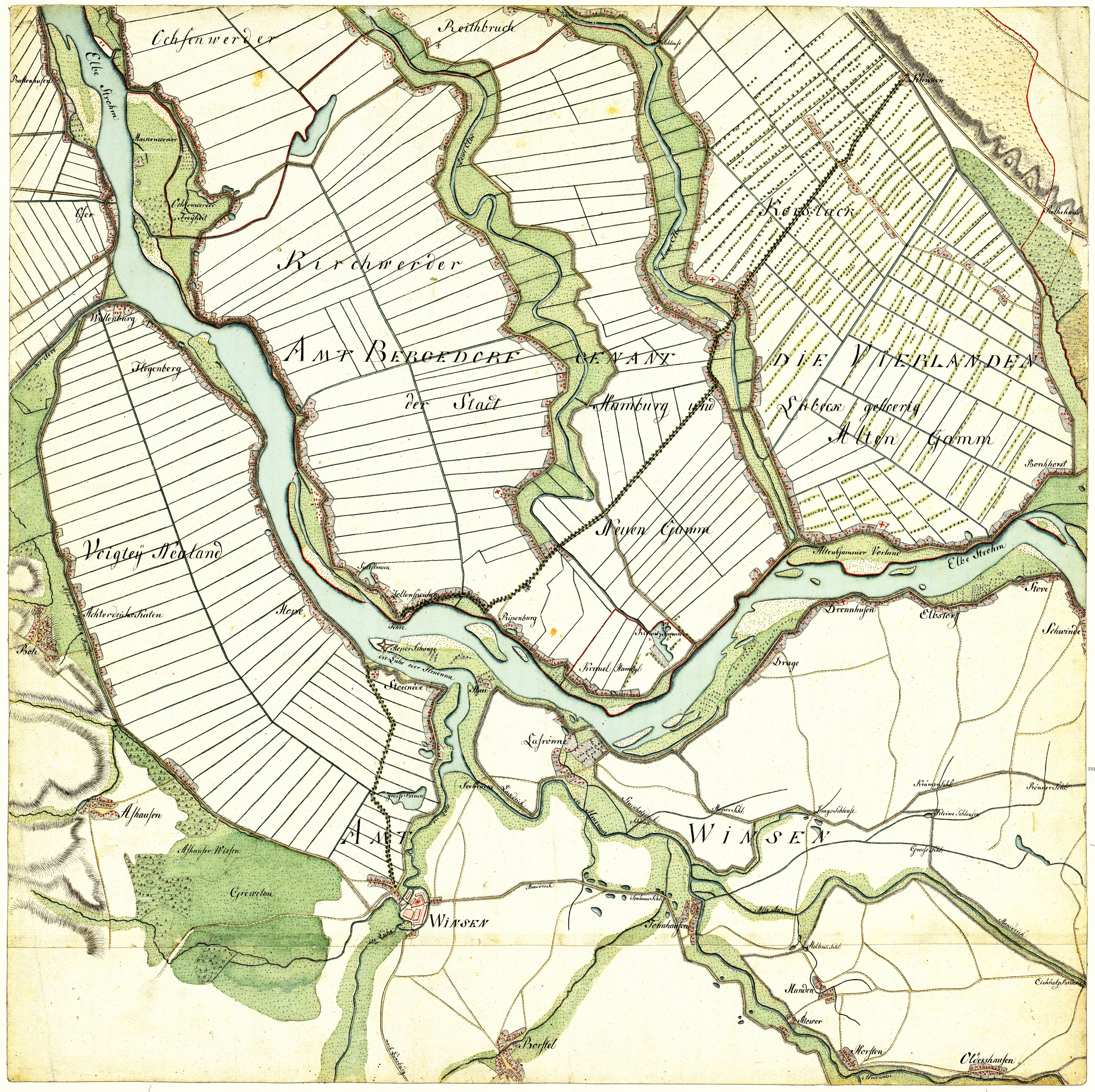
Map of the Vierlande around 1790

The populace of the Vierlande were free farmers, but sovereignty over the whole region frequently changed hands. From the 12th century it belonged to the dukes of Saxe-Lauenburg who, due to a shortage of money, enfeoffed it to the free Hanseatic cities of Hamburg and Lübeck. In 1401 Saxe-Lauenburg repossessed it without returning the pledge money; however, the Vierlande, along with Bergedorf and Riepenburg, were reconquered by the two cities in 1420 and, as a result of the Treaty of Perleberg, managed jointly as a condominium until the 19th century. This status continued until 1868, when they were taken over by Hamburg. Part of Kirchwerder remained, however, an exclave of the Prussian District of Harburg until the enactment of the Greater Hamburg Act in 1938.

Altengamme is first mentioned in the records in 1188; Neuengamme ("New Island") and Kirchwerder in 1212, and Curslack in 1217.

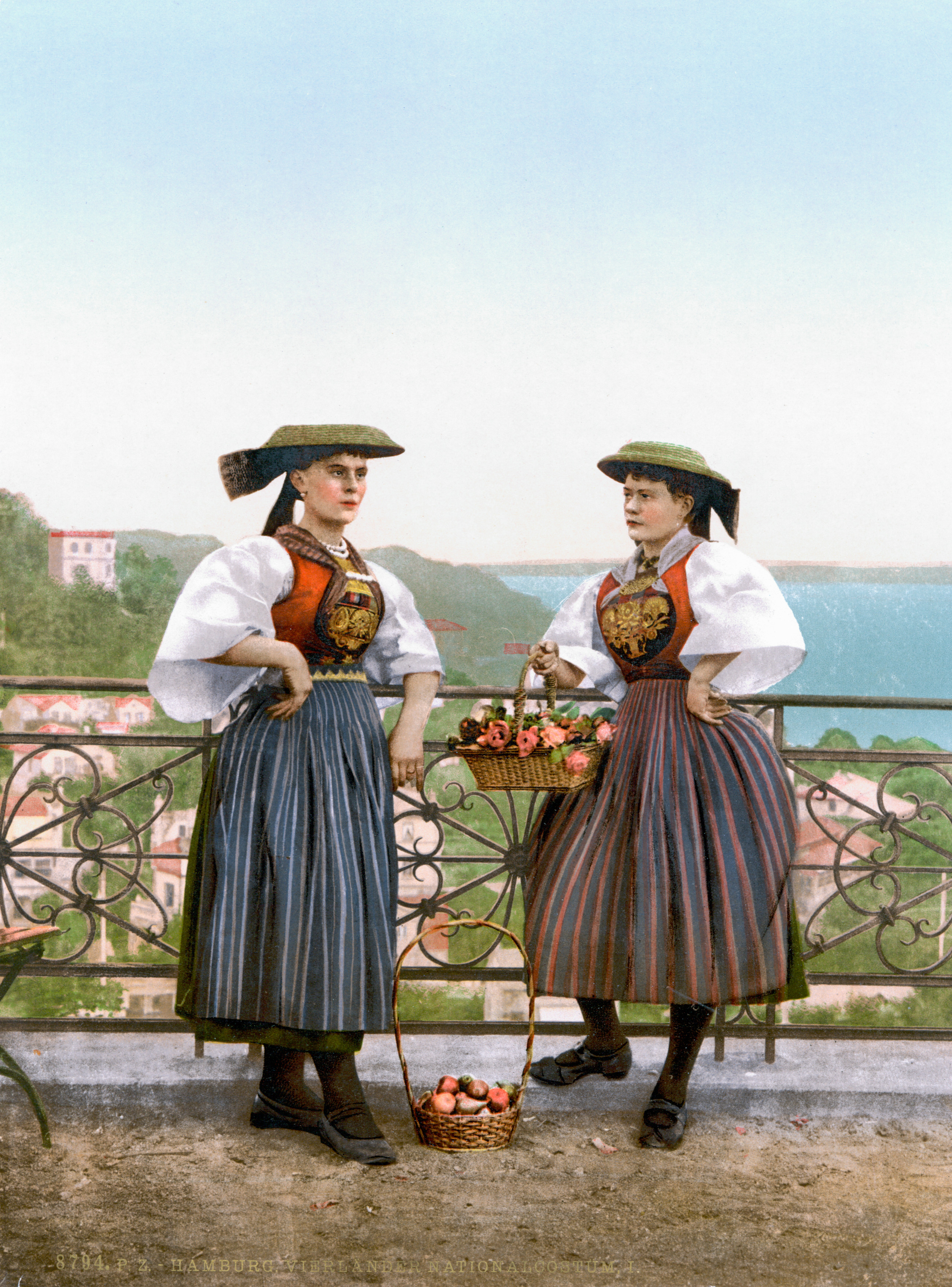
Traditional costume of the Vierlande farmers' wives

== Dyke construction ==
The first dykes were constructed in the 12th century as part of land reclamation.

== Museums ==
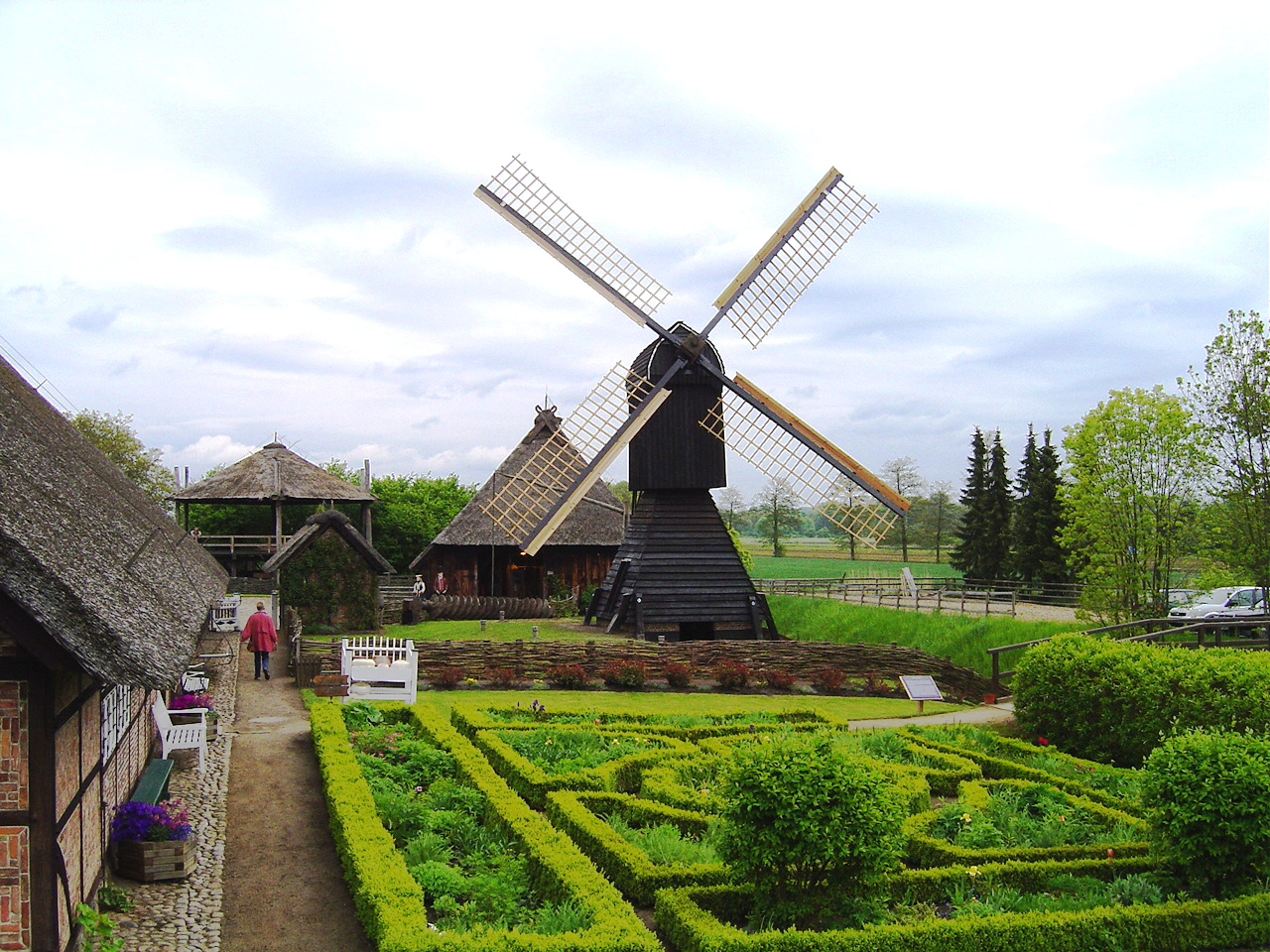
Kokerwindmühle used for drainage at Rieck-Haus

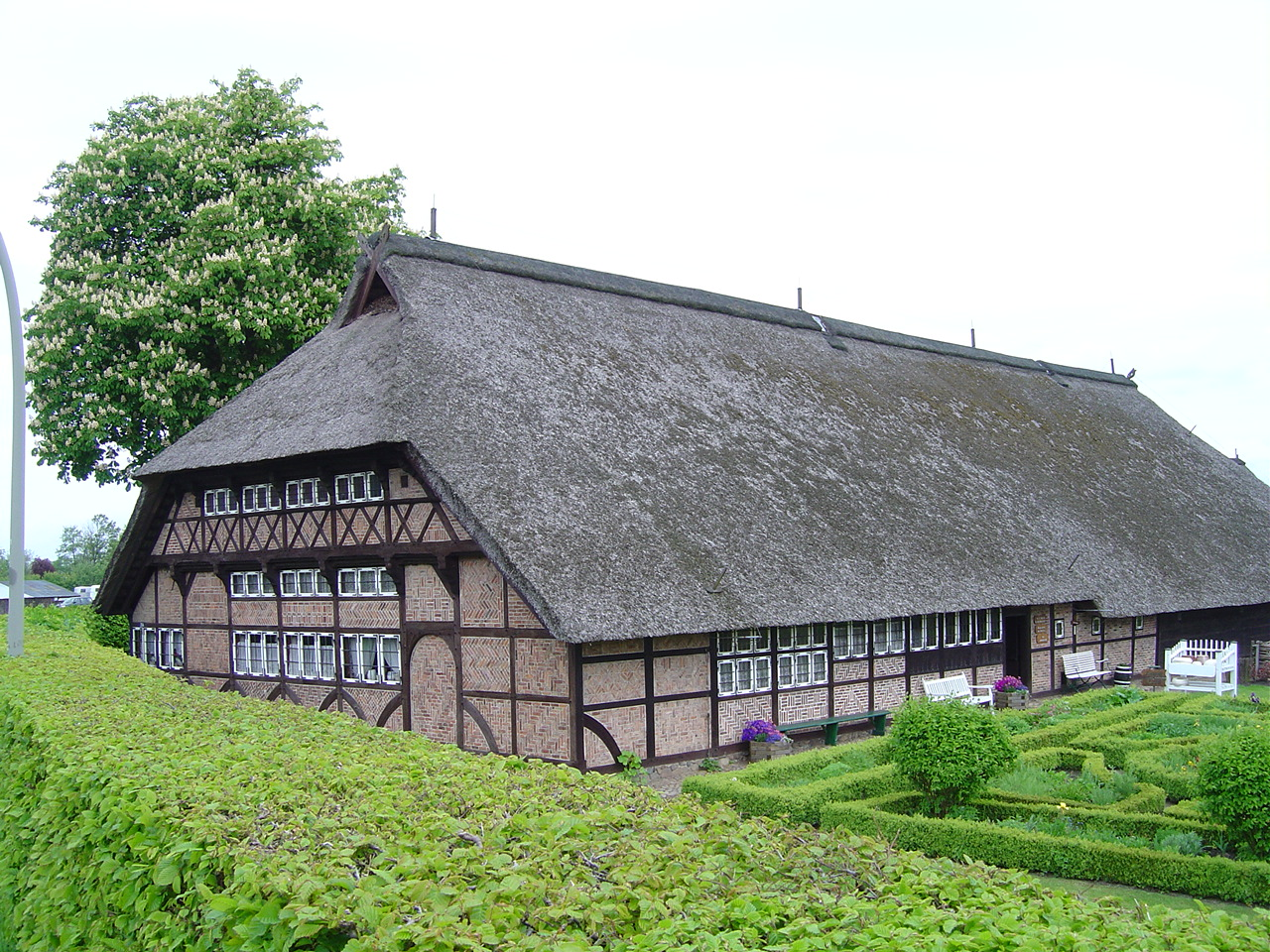
Rieck-Haus

The Rieck-Haus is built in the style of a Fachhallenhaus and is an open-air museum in Curslack. It is part of the Bergedorf Museum Landscape (Bergedorfer Museumslandschaft), which also manages the regional museum, the Museum for Bergedorf and the Vierlande (Museum für Bergedorf und die Vierlande) in Bergedorf Castle.

== Literature ==
- Torkild Hinrichsen: Natur - Kultur. Ein Lehrstück aus den Vierlanden. In: Lichtwark-Heft No. 72, Verlag HB-Werbung, Hamburg-Bergedorf 2007, ISSN 1862-3549.
- Harald Richert: Hutständer - eine Besonderheit der Vierländer Kirchen. In: Lichtwark-Heft No. 69, Verlag HB-Werbung, Hamburg-Bergedorf 2004, ISSN 1862-3549.
- H. Schween: Zur Geschichte der Vierlande. In: Lichtwark Nr. 11., 1. Jahrg., Hrsg. Lichtwark-Ausschuß, Bergedorf 1949. Siehe jetzt: Verlag HB-Werbung, Hamburg-Bergedorf.
- Achim Sperber: Vier- und Marschlande, Land hinterm Deich. Hans Christians Verlag, Hamburg 1981, ISBN 3-7672-0734-6.
- Ludwig Uphoff: Die Vierlande und der Vierländer. In: Lichtwark Nr. 7, Hrsg. Lichtwark-Ausschuß, Bergedorf 1953. Siehe jetzt: Verlag HB-Werbung, Hamburg-Bergedorf.
- Kulturbehörde/Denkmalschutzamt Hamburg (Herausgeber): Vier- und Marschlande. Hans Christians Verlag, Hamburg 1986, ISBN 3-7672-0969-1.
- Hamburger Sparkasse (publisher): Hamburg von Altona bis Zollenspieker. Hoffmann und Campe, Hamburg 2002, ISBN 3-455-11333-8.
- Gundula Hubrich-Messow: Sagen und Märchen aus Hamburg. Husum-Verlag, Husum 2002, ISBN 3-89876-036-7.
