= Bergedorf (quarter) =

- Quarter of Hamburg
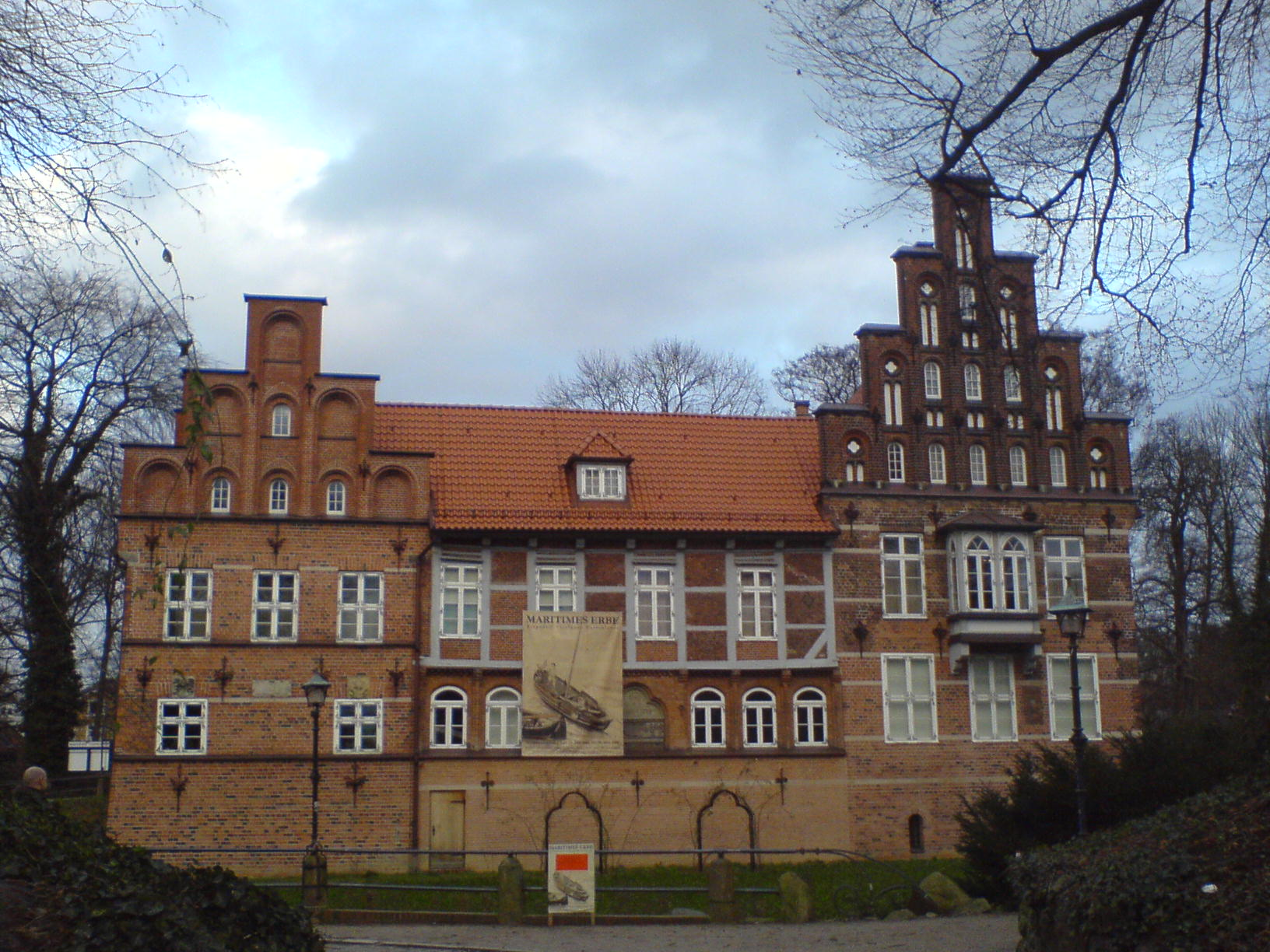
- Bergedorf Castle
- Interactive map of Bergedorf
- Location within Germany Location within Hamburg
- Coordinates: 53°29′00″N 10°13′00″E
- Country: Germany
- State: Hamburg
- City: Hamburg
- Borough: Bergedorf

Area
  - Total: 11.3 km^{2} (4.4 sq mi)

Population (2024-12-31)
  - Total: 37,560
  - Density: 3,320/km^{2} (8,610/sq mi)
- Time zone: UTC+01:00 (CET)
  - Summer (DST): UTC+02:00 (CEST)
- Dialling codes: 040
- Vehicle registration: HH

Bergedorf (German: [ˈbɛʁɡədɔʁf]) is a quarter in the borough of Hamburg in northern Germany. In 2020, the population was 36,160.

== History ==
The quarter was first mentioned in 1162. The today's quarter is the old city Bergedorf and located on the river Bille, a right tributary of the Elbe.

== Geography ==
Bergedorf, situated in the south-eastern side of Hamburg, borders with the quarters of Lohbrügge, Billwerder, Allermöhe, Curslack and Altengamme; and with the district of Herzogtum Lauenburg, in Schleswig-Holstein.

In 2006, the quarter Bergedorf has an area of 11.3 km^{2} (4 sq mi).

== Politics ==
These are the results of Bergedorf in the Hamburg state election:

| State Election | SPD | Greens | CDU | Left | AfD | FDP | Others |
|---|---|---|---|---|---|---|---|
| 2025 | 35.5 % | 16.1 % | 19.7 % | 10.0 % | 9.7 % | 1.9 % | 7.1 % |
| 2020 | 39.2 % | 22.8 % | 10.3 % | 9.0 % | 6.7 % | 4.3 % | 7.7 % |
| 2015 | 48,7 % | 12.1 % | 13.2 % | 8.1 % | 6.8 % | 6.6 % | 4.6 % |
| 2011 | 50,0 % | 11.1 % | 20.0 % | 6.8 % | – | 5.2 % | 6.0 % |
| 2008 | 36.3 % | 9.4 % | 40.4 % | 7.4 % | – | 3.7 % | 2.7 % |
| 2004 | 34.0 % | 11.3 % | 44.4 % | – | – | 2.6 % | 7.8 % |
| 2001 | 39.9 % | 8.0 % | 25.1 % | 0.3 % | – | 4.0 % | 22.7 % |
| 1997 | 39.0 % | 13.9 % | 27.6 % | 0.5 % | – | 2.7 % | 16.3 % |

== Demographics ==
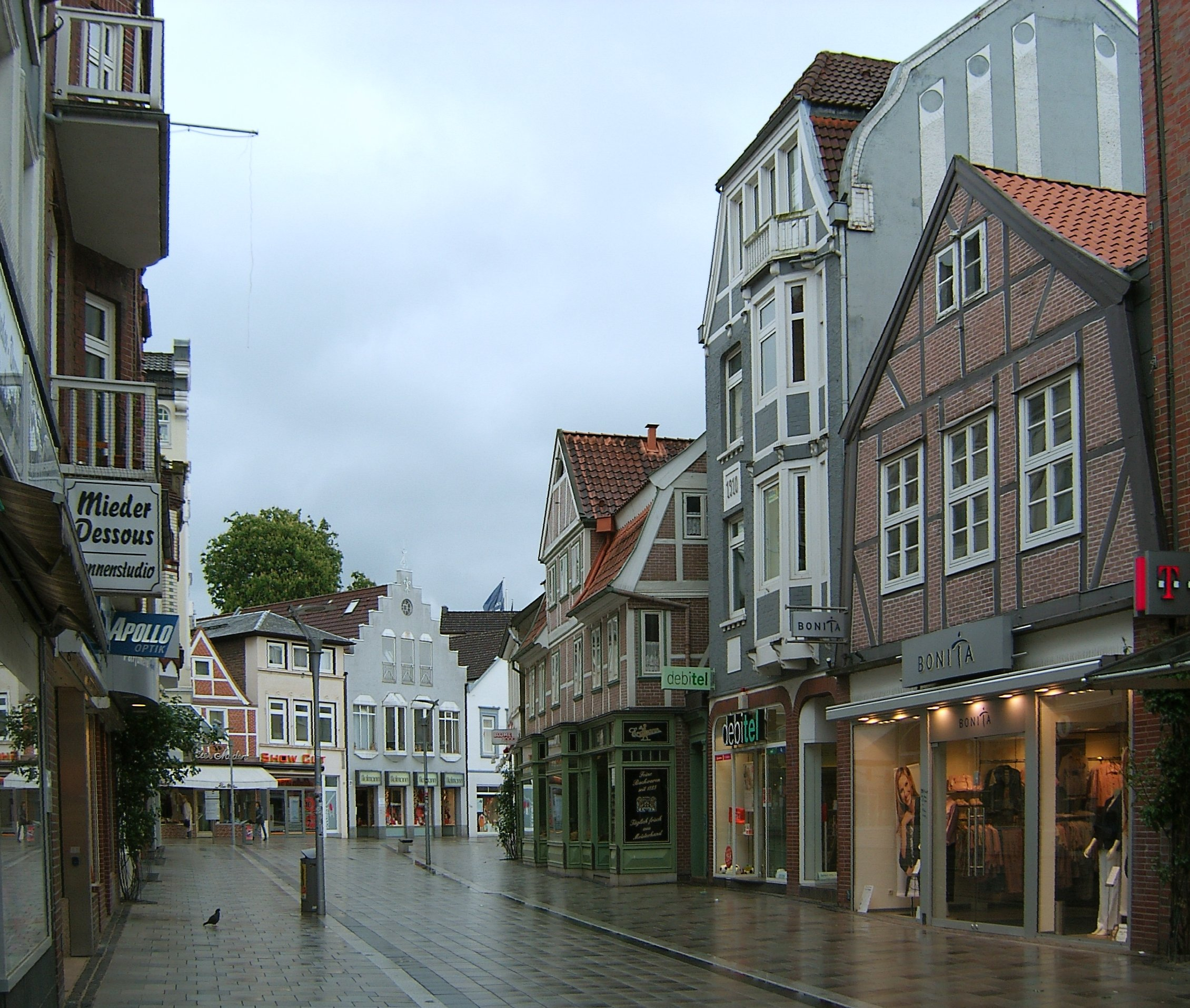
Sachsentor

In 2006 in the quarter Bergedorf were living 40,678 people. The population density was 3,587/km^{2} (9,290/sq mi). 19% were children under the age of 18, and 16.2% were 65 years of age or older. 9.9% were immigrants. 2,479 people were registered as unemployed. In 1999 there were 19,603 households and 38% of all households were made up of individuals.

According to the Department of Motor Vehicles (Kraftfahrt-Bundesamt), in the quarter Bergedorf were 15.104 private cars registered (372 cars/1000 people).

There were 8 elementary schools and 5 secondary schools in the quarter Bergedorf and 112 physicians in private practice and 12 pharmacies.

Unlike the mere quarters of Hamburg, Bergedorf still has its own town hall in being.

== Notable present or former residents ==
- Johann Adolph Hasse
- Heinrich Rathmann
- Friedrich Chrysander
- Ida Boy-Ed
- Ferdinand Pfohl
- Bernhard Schmidt
- Anton Aloys Timpe
- Kurt A. Körber
- Frank Appel
- Jörg Pilawa
- Wolfe+585, Senior, a.k.a. Hubert Blaine Wolfe, Held the Guinness Book of World Records Longest Name in 1978

== See also ==
- Hamburg-Bergedorf station
