= Ochsenwerder =

- Quarter of Hamburg
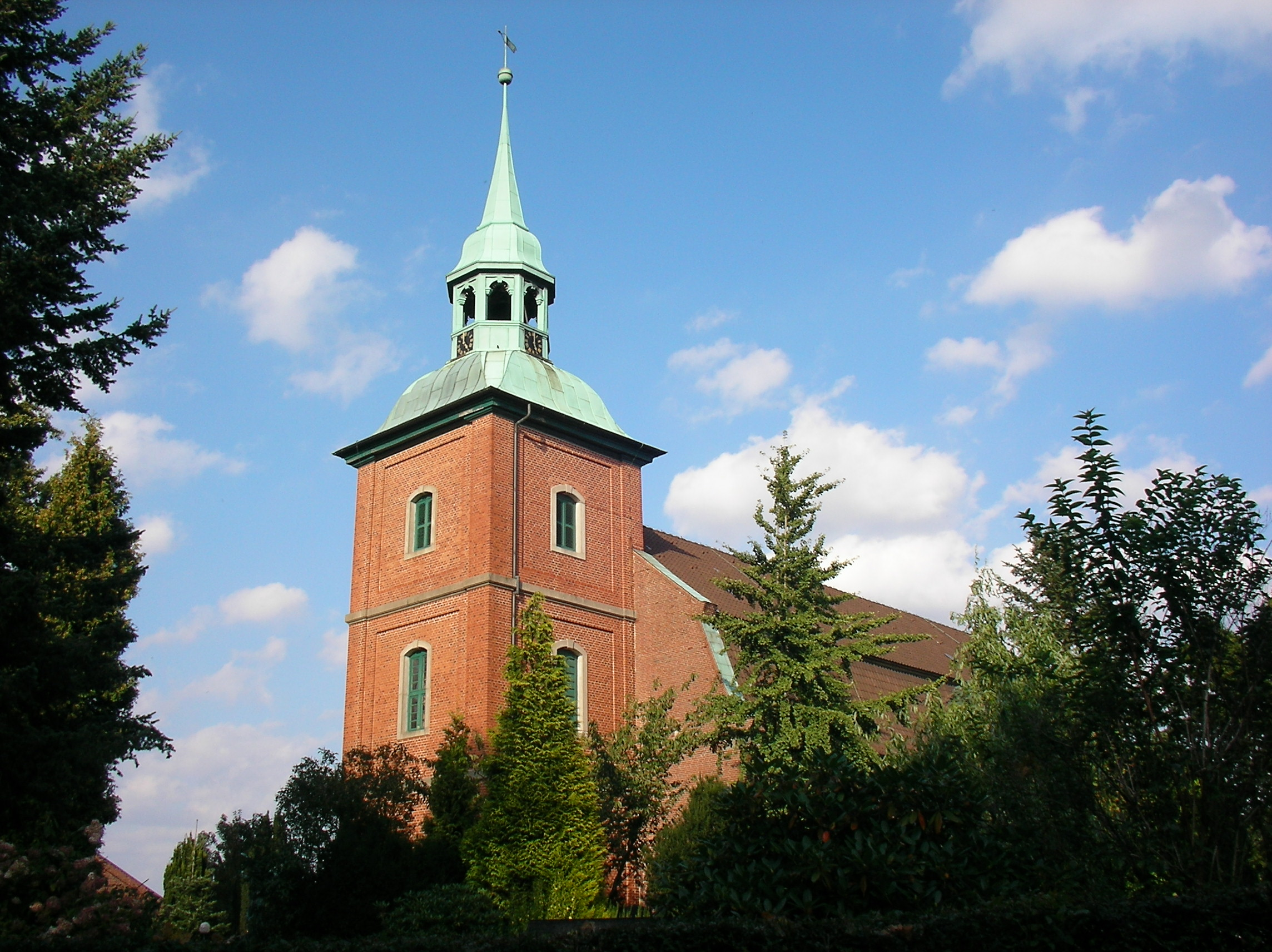
- St.-Pankratius Church
- Interactive map of Ochsenwerder
- Location within Germany Location within Hamburg
- Coordinates: 53°27′25″N 10°5′33″E
- Country: Germany
- State: Hamburg
- City: Hamburg
- Borough: Bergedorf

Area
  - Total: 14.1 km^{2} (5.4 sq mi)

Population (2024-12-31)
  - Total: 3,015
  - Density: 214/km^{2} (554/sq mi)
- Time zone: UTC+01:00 (CET)
  - Summer (DST): UTC+02:00 (CEST)
- Dialling codes: 040
- Vehicle registration: HH

Ochsenwerder (German pronunciation: [ɔksn̩ˈvɛʁdɐ]) is a quarter in Hamburg, Germany, in the borough of Bergedorf. In 2020 the population was over 3,000. Agriculture plays a very big role in this quarter for the metropolitan area.

== Geography ==
Ochsenwerder is in the southeast of Hamburg at the Elbe river. In the south of Ochsenwerder is the Oortkaten lake. Ochsenwerder borders the quarters Kirchwerder, Reitbrook, Tatenberg and Spadenland. Furthermore, Ochsenwerder borders to the quarter Wilhelmsburg and the Bundesland Lower Saxony with the Elbe river.

== Politics ==
These are the results of Ochsenwerder in the Hamburg state election:

State Election	SPD	CDU	Greens	AfD	FDP	Left	Others
2020	37,7 %	20,2 %	14,8 %	8,9 %	5,5 %	4,8 %	8,1 %
2015	46,4 %	23,2 %	6,0 %	8,5 %	7,6 %	4,3 %	4,0 %
2011	42,2 %	34,7 %	8,7 %	–	7,1 %	3,1 %	4,2 %
