= Bergedorf =

Bergedorf Bergedorf
- Borough of Hamburg
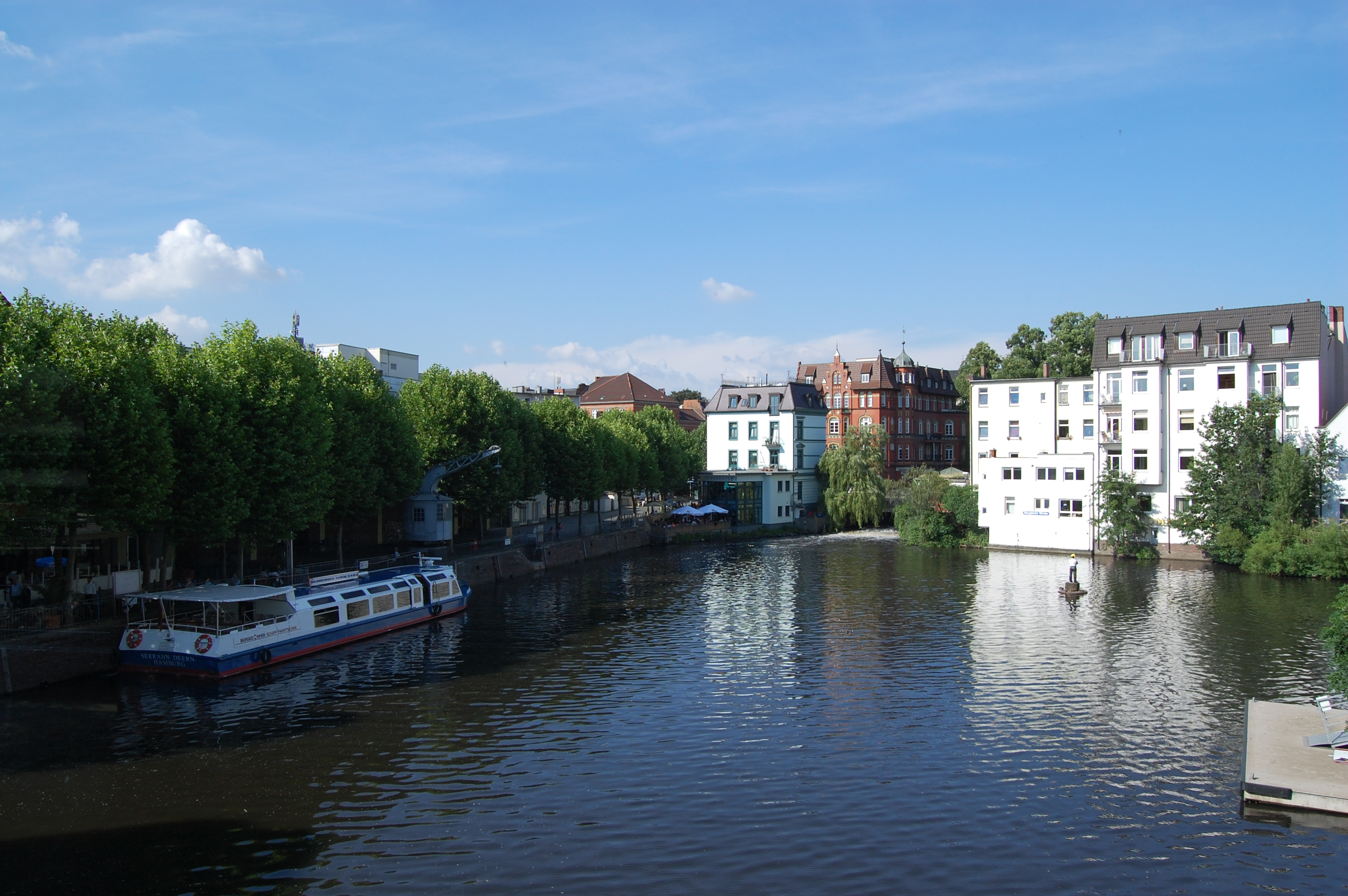
- The small harbour in Bergedorf.

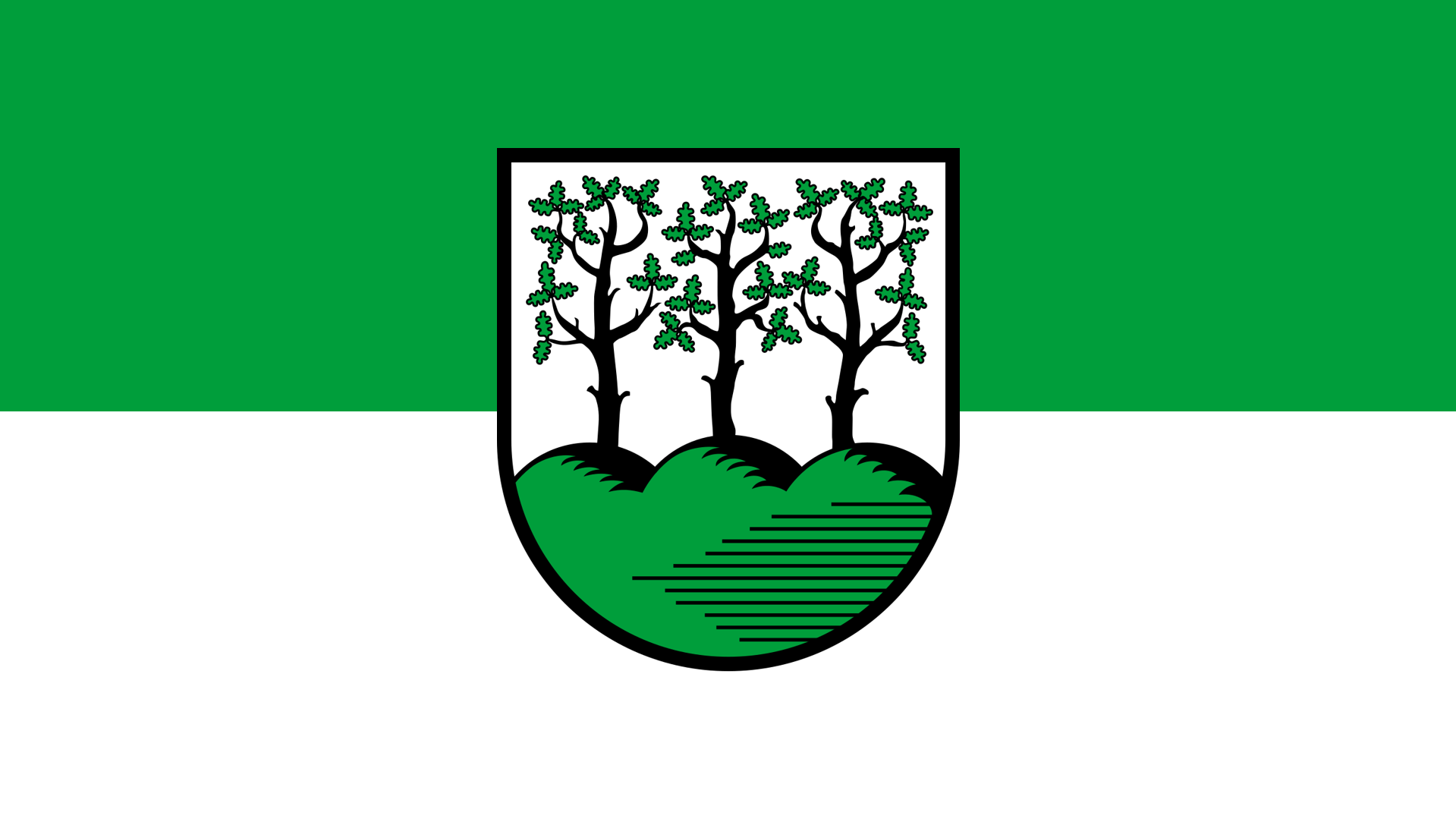
- Flag Coat of arms

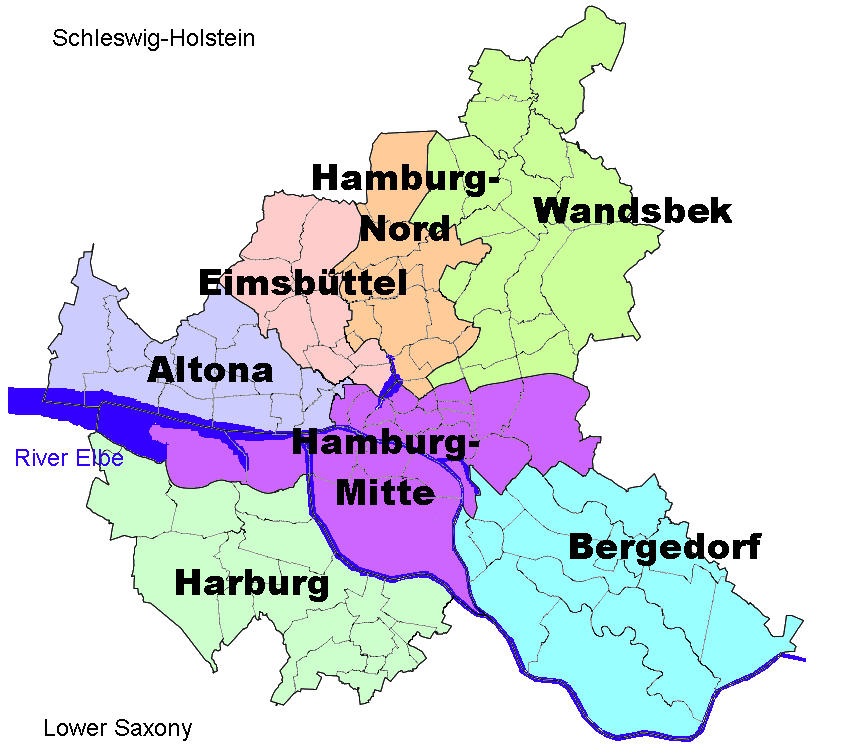
- Boroughs of Hamburg
- Interactive map of Bergedorf
- Location within Germany Location within Hamburg
- Coordinates: 53°29′14″N 10°12′37″E
- Country: Germany
- State: Hamburg
- City: Hamburg
- Subdivisions: 14 quarters

Area
  - Total: 154.8 km^{2} (59.8 sq mi)

Population (2024-12-31)
  - Total: 134,263
  - Density: 867.3/km^{2} (2,246/sq mi)
- Time zone: UTC+01:00 (CET)
  - Summer (DST): UTC+02:00 (CEST)
- Dialling codes: 040
- Vehicle registration: HH

Bergedorf (German: [ˈbɛʁɡədɔʁf]) is the largest of the seven boroughs of Hamburg, Germany, named after Bergedorf quarter within this borough. In 2020 the population of the borough was 130,994.

== History ==
The city of Bergedorf received town privileges in 1275, then a part of the younger Duchy of Saxony (1180–1296), which was partitioned by its four co-ruling dukes in 1296 into the branch duchies of Saxe-Lauenburg and Saxe-Wittenberg. Bergedorf then became part of the former. This was only to last until 1303, when Lauenburg's three co-ruling dukes, Albert III, Eric I, and John II partitioned their branch duchy into three smaller duchies.

Eric then held Bergedorf (Vierlande) and Lauenburg and inherited the share of his childless brother Albert III, Saxe-Ratzeburg, after he was already deceased in 1308 and a retained section from Albert's widow Margaret of Brandenburg-Salzwedel on her death. However, his other brother, John II, then claimed a part, so in 1321 Eric conceded Bergedorf (with Vierlande) to him, whose share thus became known thereafter as Saxe-Bergedorf-Mölln while Eric's was known as Saxe-Ratzeburg-Lauenburg.

In 1370, John's fourth successor Eric III pawned the Herrschaft of Bergedorf, the Vierlande, half the Saxon Wood and Geesthacht to Lübeck in return for a credit of 16,262.5 Lübeck marks. This acquisition included much of the trade route between Hamburg and Lübeck, thus providing a safe passage for freight between the cities. Eric III only retained a life tenancy.

The city of Lübeck and Eric III further stipulated, that upon his death, Lübeck would be entitled to take possession of the pawned areas until his successors repaid the credit and simultaneously exercised the repurchase of Mölln (contracted in 1359), altogether amounting to the then enormous sum of 26,000 Lübeck Marks.

In 1401, Eric III died without issue and was succeeded by his second cousin Eric IV of Saxe-Ratzeburg-Lauenburg. In the same year, Eric IV, supported by his sons Eric (later ruling as Eric V) and John, forcefully captured the pawned areas without making any repayment, before Lübeck could take possession of them. Lübeck acquiesced for the time being.

In 1420, Eric V attacked Prince-Elector Frederick I of Brandenburg and Lübeck allied with Hamburg in support of Brandenburg. Armies of both cities opened a second front and conquered Bergedorf, Riepenburg castle and the Esslingen river toll station (today's Zollenspieker Ferry) within weeks. This forced Eric V to agree with Hamburg's burgomaster Hein Hoyer and Burgomaster Jordan Pleskow of Lübeck to the Peace of Perleberg on 23 August 1420, which stipulated that all the pawned areas, which Eric IV, Eric V and John IV had violently taken in 1401, were to be irrevocably ceded to the cities of Hamburg and Lübeck.

=== Hamburg-Lübeck Condominium ===
The cities transformed the acquired areas into the "Beiderstädtischer Besitz" (bi-urban condominium; cooperatively governed possession), ruled by bailiffs in four year terms, alternately staffed by one of the cities. In 1446 the bailiffs' terms were increased to six years, and in 1620 to life terms. In 1542 bailiff Ditmar Koel introduced the Protestant Reformation in the co-governed municipalities. The area was formally annexed to the First French Empire as part of Bouches de l'Elbe département between 1811 and 1813. Thereafter, the area was restored to Hamburg and Lübeck, both sovereign states. The first railway in Northern Germany was opened between Hamburg and Bergedorf by the Hamburg-Bergedorf Railway Company in 1842. In the 1860s the Condominium issued its own postage stamps. In 1863 the condominium measured 1039,99 million square Hamburg foot (1 Hamburg foot =286,57 mm), of which 947,34 million sqft were Bergedorf city and the four Vierlande municipalities (Altengamme, Curslack, Kirchwerder and Neuengamme) and 92,65 million sqft of Geesthacht (since 1937 no part of today's borough of Bergdorf anymore).

=== Hamburg rural seigniory ===
Effective of 1 January 1868 Lübeck sold its share in the bi-urban condominium to the Free and Hanseatic City of Hamburg for 200,000 Prussian thaler. Hamburg integrated the area into its state territory, forming there the Landherrenschaft Bergedorf (i.e. Bergedorf rural seigniory) comprising the cities of Bergedorf and Geesthacht and a number of rural municipalities not integrated into the city of Hamburg proper. By the Greater Hamburg Act of 1937 the exclave of Geesthacht was ceded to Schleswig-Holstein.

=== Bergedorf Borough of Hamburg ===
On 1 April 1938 Bergedorf city and the other municipalities became the Borough of Bergedorf, an integrated part of the city of Hamburg. Bergedorf is also known by its nickname Garden of Hamburg.

== Geography ==
Located in the south-east of the city, the borough of Bergedorf comprises the districts of Allermöhe, Altengamme, Bergedorf, Billwerder, Curslack, Kirchwerder, Lohbrügge, Moorfleet, Neuallermöhe (new district since January 2011), Neuengamme, Ochsenwerder, Reitbrook, Spadenland and Tatenberg.

In 2017 the city of Hamburg started planning the new quarter Oberbillwerder which is located in today's Billwerder.

In 2006, according to the statistical office of Hamburg and Schleswig-Holstein, the borough of Bergedorf has a total area of 154.8 square kilometres (60 sq mi).

Today's quarter is the old citBergedorf, located on the river Bille, a right tributary of the Elbe.

== Demographics ==
In 2006, 118,942 people were living in Bergedorf borough. The population density was 769 inhabitants per square kilometre (1,992/sq mi). 19.3% were children under the age of 18, and 18.2% were 65 years of age or older. 9.6% were immigrants. 6,027 people were registered as unemployed. In 1999 there were 51,752 households and 34.6% of all households were made up of individuals.

According to the Department of Motor Vehicles (Kraftfahrt-Bundesamt), there were 48,003 private cars registered (406 cars/1000 people) in the borough of Bergedorf.

There were 22 elementary schools, 16 secondary schools, 184 physicians in private practice, and 23 pharmacies in the borough of Bergedorf. These numbers include the Bergedorf quarter.

== Assembly of the borough ==
Subdivisions of Bergedorf

The Bezirksversammlung is elected as representatives of the citizens, simultaneously with elections to the European Parliament. It consists of 45 representatives.

=== Elections ===
District parliament election of Bergedorf in 2024
Parties	%	±	Seats
Christian Democratic Union	28.6	▲4.3	13
Social Democratic Party	26.6	▲0.2	12
Alliance 90/The Greens	14.6	▼7.3	7
Alternative for Germany	14.4	▲5.9	7
The Left	8.2	▼2.3	4
Free Democratic Party	4.7	▼0.8	2
Free Voters	2.9	± 0.0	0
Total			45

== Postage stamps ==
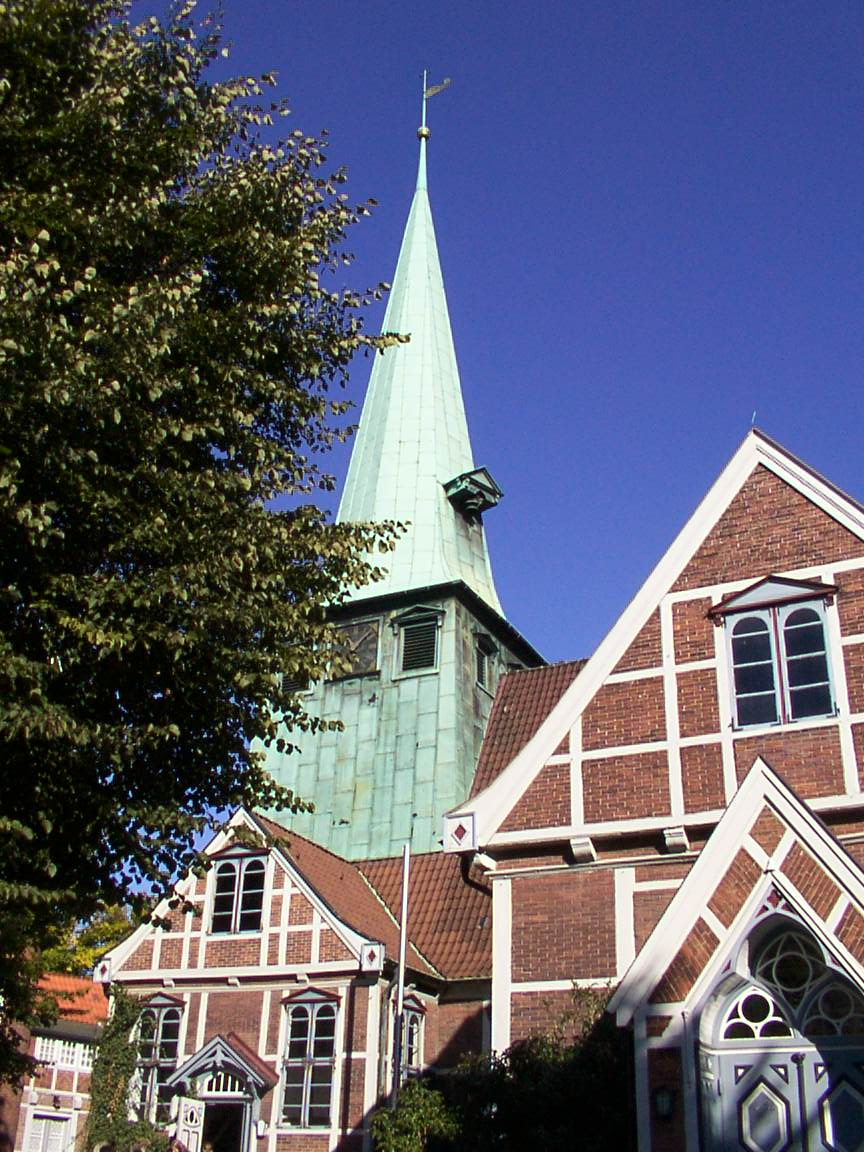
Church "St. Peter and Pauli"

The Bi-Urban Condominium (see above), or Bergedorf, respectively, its capital and the seat of its postal service Beiderstädtische Post (Bi-Urban Mail), founded on 1 April 1847, is of note to philatelists because it issued its own postage stamps between 1861 and 1867. According to the census of March 1863 the Bi-Urban Condominium had a population of 12,468 souls, of which 2,957 lived in Bergedorf city (the rest lived in the other five municipalities of the condominium), making it by far the German territory with the smallest population to issue stamps.

The issue included 5 square stamps with denominations from ½ to 4 schillings. All used the same design - a combined coat of arms of the Free Cities of Lübeck and Hamburg (the two city states which were the sovereign lords over the Bi-Urban Condominium) - but the higher values were larger stamps. All values were printed in black on different coloured papers, except for the 3s stamp, which was printed in blue on pink paper. With Lübeck's sale of its share in the condominium to Hamburg in 1867 the territory was integrated into the adjacent city state of Hamburg as the Rural Seigniory of Bergedorf and the separate Bi-Urban Mail became part of Hamburg's postal service without any more separate stamps. Hamburg, including its Rural Seigniory of Bergedorf began using stamps of the North German Confederation in 1868.

Since the Bi-Urban Condominium had such a small population, relatively few of these stamps were made, and even fewer used; the price of unused stamps is from US$30–$50, while genuinely used stamps go for US$300–$2,000. Reprints, forgeries, and especially faked cancellations are quite common.

== Economy and infrastructure ==
=== Traffic ===
Hamburg Bergedorf is a train station of suburban, local and long distance trains.

=== Energy ===
A wind farm is located in Bergedorf to produce electricity through wind turbines.

== Notable structures ==
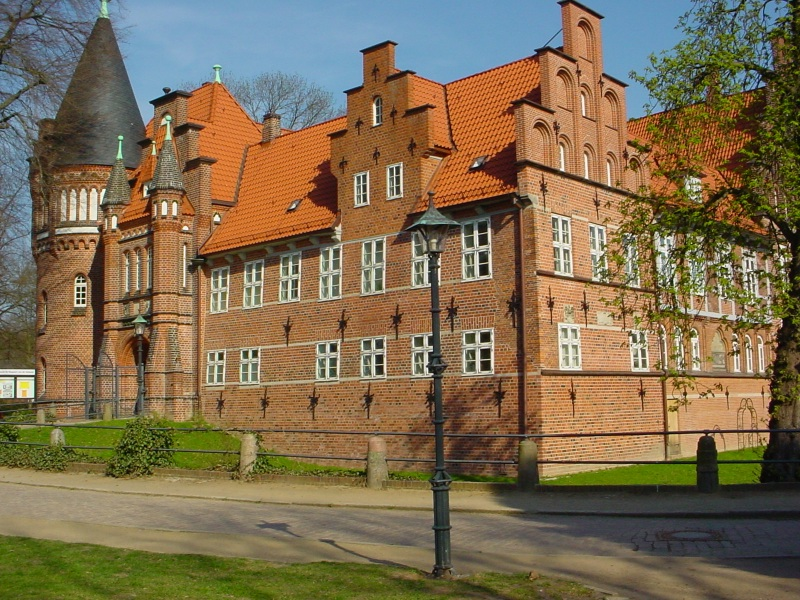
Schloss Bergedorf now houses a history museum.

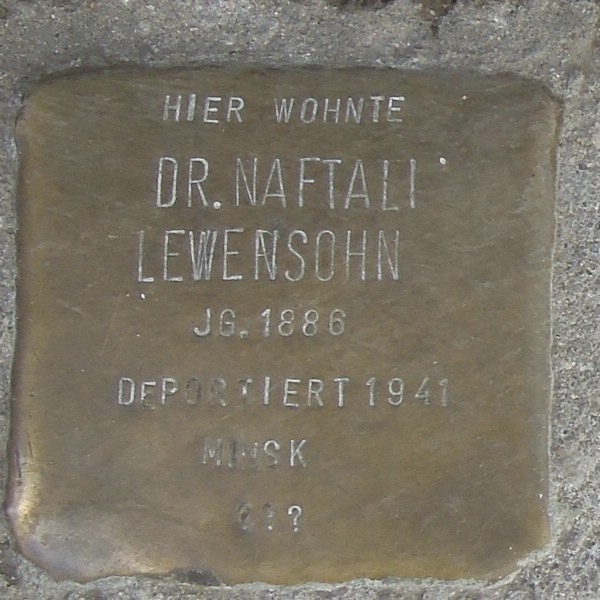
Stolperstein for Dr. Naftali Lewensohn, Sachsentor 38

- Church "St. Petri and Pauli"
- Fernmeldeturm Hamburg-Bergedorf
- Transmitter Hamburg-Billstedt
- Hamburger Sternwarte also called Hamburg-Bergedorf Observatory
- Schloss Bergedorf
- Hansa-Gymnasium

== Notable people ==
- Ida Boy-Ed (1852–1928), writer
- Johann Adolph Hasse, (1699–1783), composer
- Alfred Lichtwark (1852–1914), director of the Hamburger Kunsthalle
- Ferdinand Pfohl (1862–1949), music critic, music writer and composer
- Hubert Blaine Wolfeschlegelsteinhausenbergerdorff Sr (1914-1997), person with the longest name in history

== See also ==
- Hamburg-Bergedorf station

== Bibliography ==
- Harald Richert: Bergedorf - eine selbständige Stadt. In: Lichtwark Nr. 54. Hrsg. Lichtwark-Ausschuß, Bergedorf, 1991. Jetzt: Verlag HB-Werbung, Hamburg-Bergedorf. ISSN 1862-3549.
