= Allermöhe =

- Quarter of Hamburg
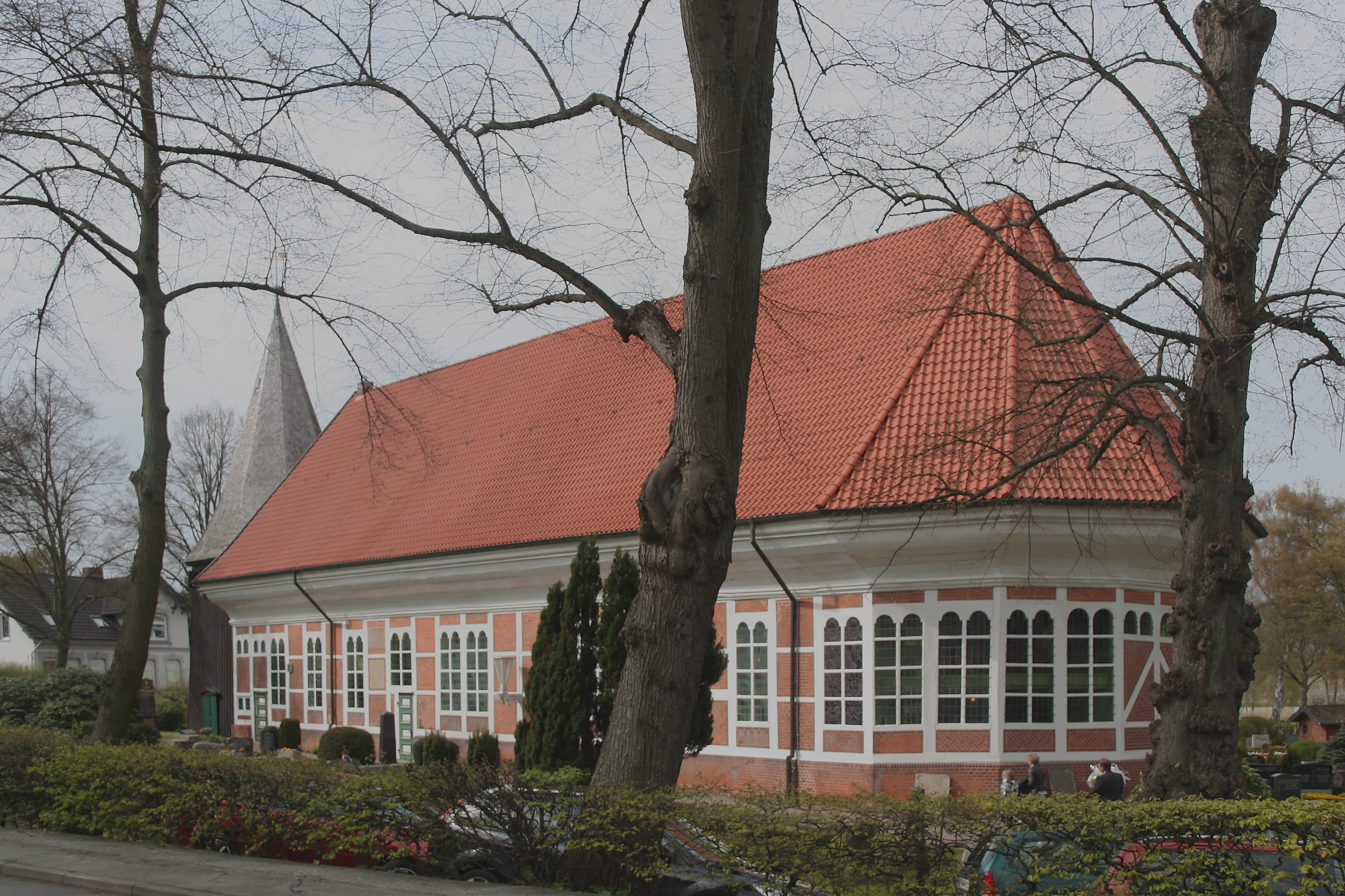
- Trinity Church

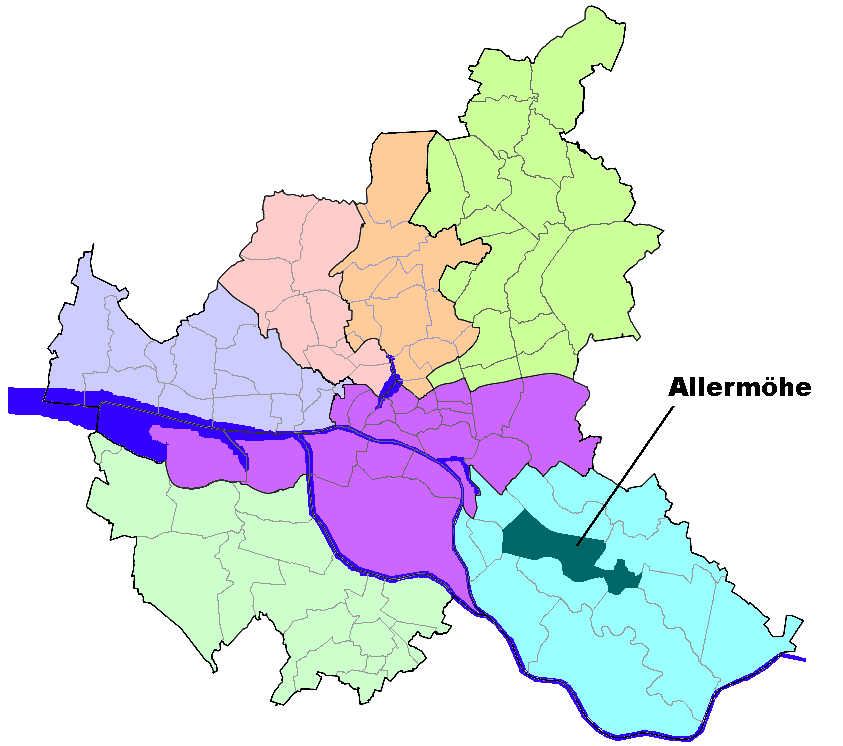
- Location of Allermöhe of Hamburg, Germany
- Interactive map of Allermöhe
- Location within Germany Location within Hamburg
- Coordinates: 53°29′0″N 10°9′0″E
- Country: Germany
- State: Hamburg
- City: Hamburg
- Borough: Bergedorf

Area
  - Total: 11.9 km^{2} (4.6 sq mi)

Population (2024-12-31)
  - Total: 1,411
  - Density: 119/km^{2} (307/sq mi)
- Time zone: UTC+01:00 (CET)
  - Summer (DST): UTC+02:00 (CEST)

Allermöhe (German pronunciation: [alɐˈmøːə]) is a quarter in the borough Bergedorf of the Free and Hanseatic city of Hamburg in northern Germany. The quarter consists of a rural area and the old settlement Allermöhe. In 2020 the population was 1,392 (without the new neighbourhood Neuallermöhe, which is a separate quarter).

== History ==
In 1410 the State of Hamburg settled the Landherrenschaft Bill- und Ochsenwerder. The settlement Allermöhe belonged to this rural village.

In 1997 the planning for a completely new neighbourhood began. From 1982 to 1994 more than 3,800 flats were constructed, creating the neighbourhood Neuallermöhe (New Allermöhe).

== Geography ==
In 2006 according to the statistical office of Hamburg and Schleswig-Holstein, the quarter Allermöhe has a total area of 11.9 square kilometres (5 sq mi).

== Politics ==
These are the results of Allermöhe in the Hamburg state election:

State Election	SPD	CDU	Greens	Left	AfD	FDP	Others
2020	34,4 %	21,3 %	15,7 %	9,1 %	8,8 %	5,1 %	5,6 %
2015	44,3 %	22,0 %	10,0 %	5,9 %	7,6 %	6,9 %	3,3 %
2011	45,8 %	36,3 %	7,4 %	3,2 %	–	3,7 %	3,7 %
2008	39,2 %	41,0 %	5,6 %	7,1 %	–	4,1 %	3,0 %

== Demographics ==
In 2006 in the quarter Allermöhe were living 15,143 people. The population density was 1,275/km^{2} (3,302/sq mi). 27.9% were children under the age of 18, and 6.7% were 65 years of age or older. Resident aliens were 14.8% of the population. 932 people were registered as unemployed.

In 1999 there were 4,243 households, out of which 41.7% had children under the age of 18 living with them and 17.3% of all households were made up of individuals. The average household size was 2.79.

Population by year

including the area of Neuallermöhe

1987	1988	1989	1990	1991	1992	1993	1994	1995	1996	1997	1998	1999
3,136	3,124	3,104	3,138	3,129	3,331	3,264	3,189	3,651	5,659	8,812	10,801	11,588

2000	2001	2002	2003	2004	2005	2006
12,536	13,424	13,883	14,264	14,877	14,943	15,143

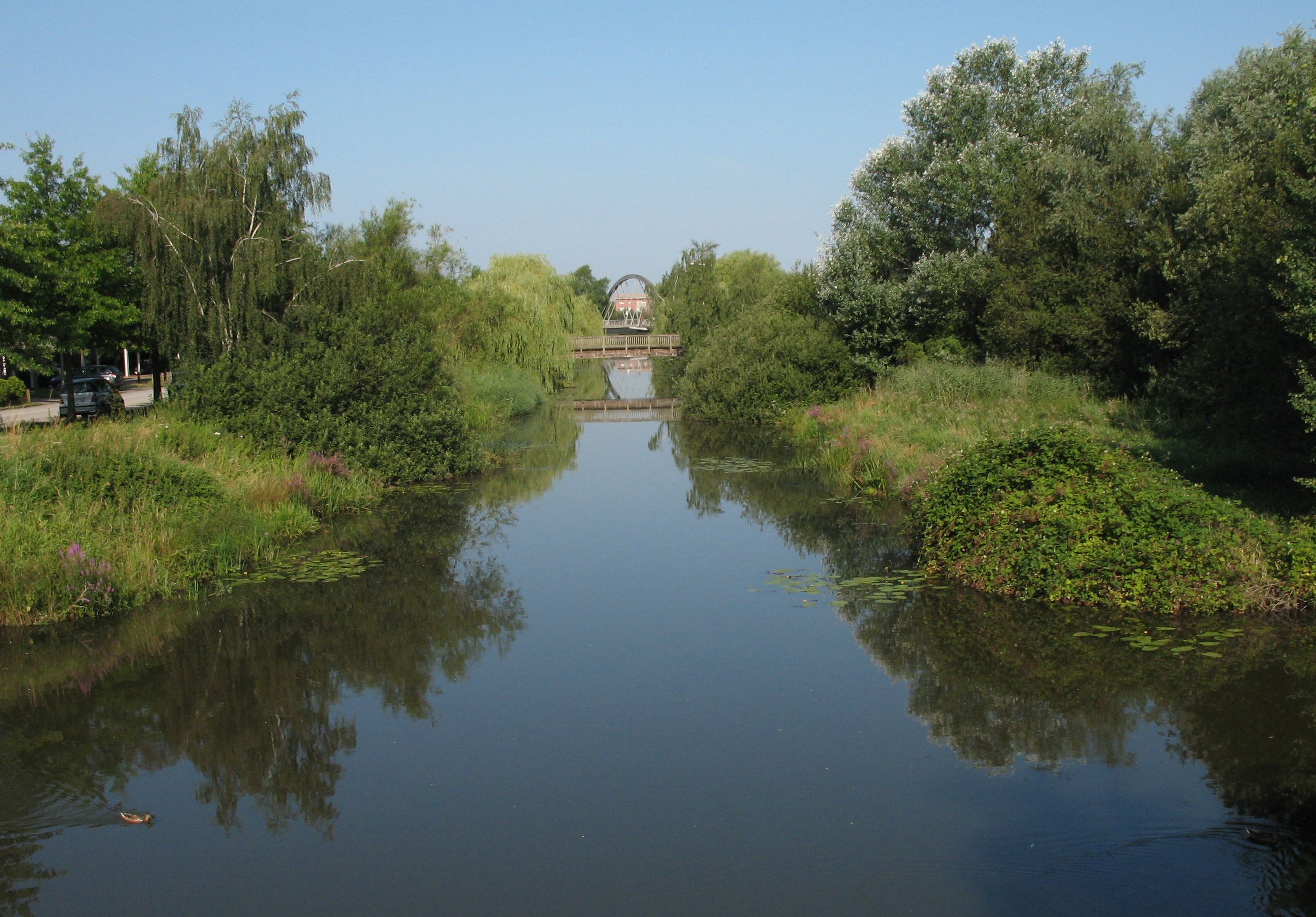
Town canal in Neuallermöhe

In 2006 there were 1,417 criminal offences (94 crimes per 1000 people).

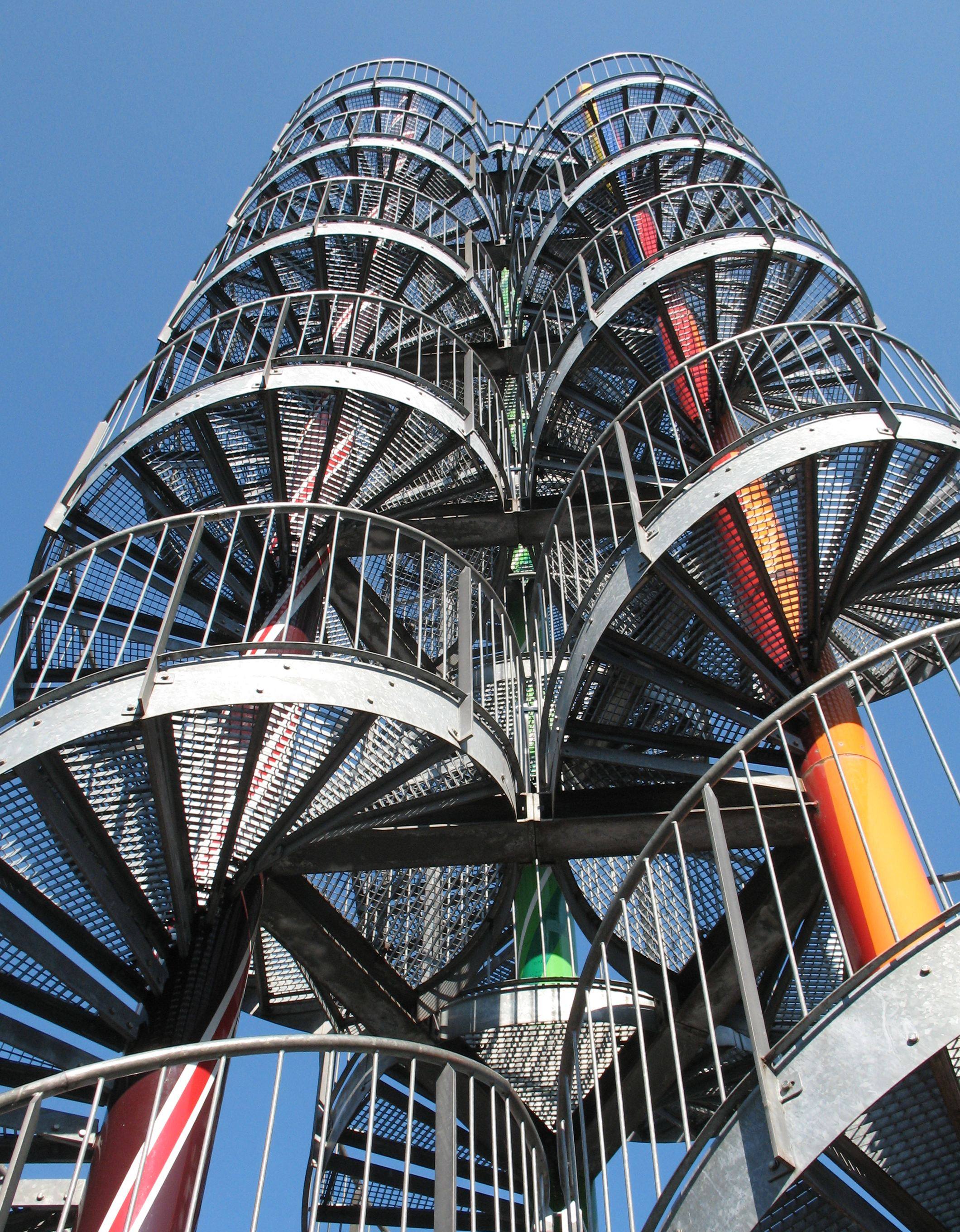
Observation tower in Neuallermöhe

There were 3 elementary schools and 4 secondary schools in the quarter Allermöhe and 6 physicians in private practice and 1 pharmacy.

=== Neu-Allermöhe West ===
In 2005 in the neighbourhood has 12,360 inhabitants and an area of 3.4 km^{2} (1 sq mi). The population density was 3,593/km^{2} (9,306/sq mi). 31.3% were children under the age of 18, and 3.8% were 65 years of age or older. 16.2% were resident aliens.

== Transport ==
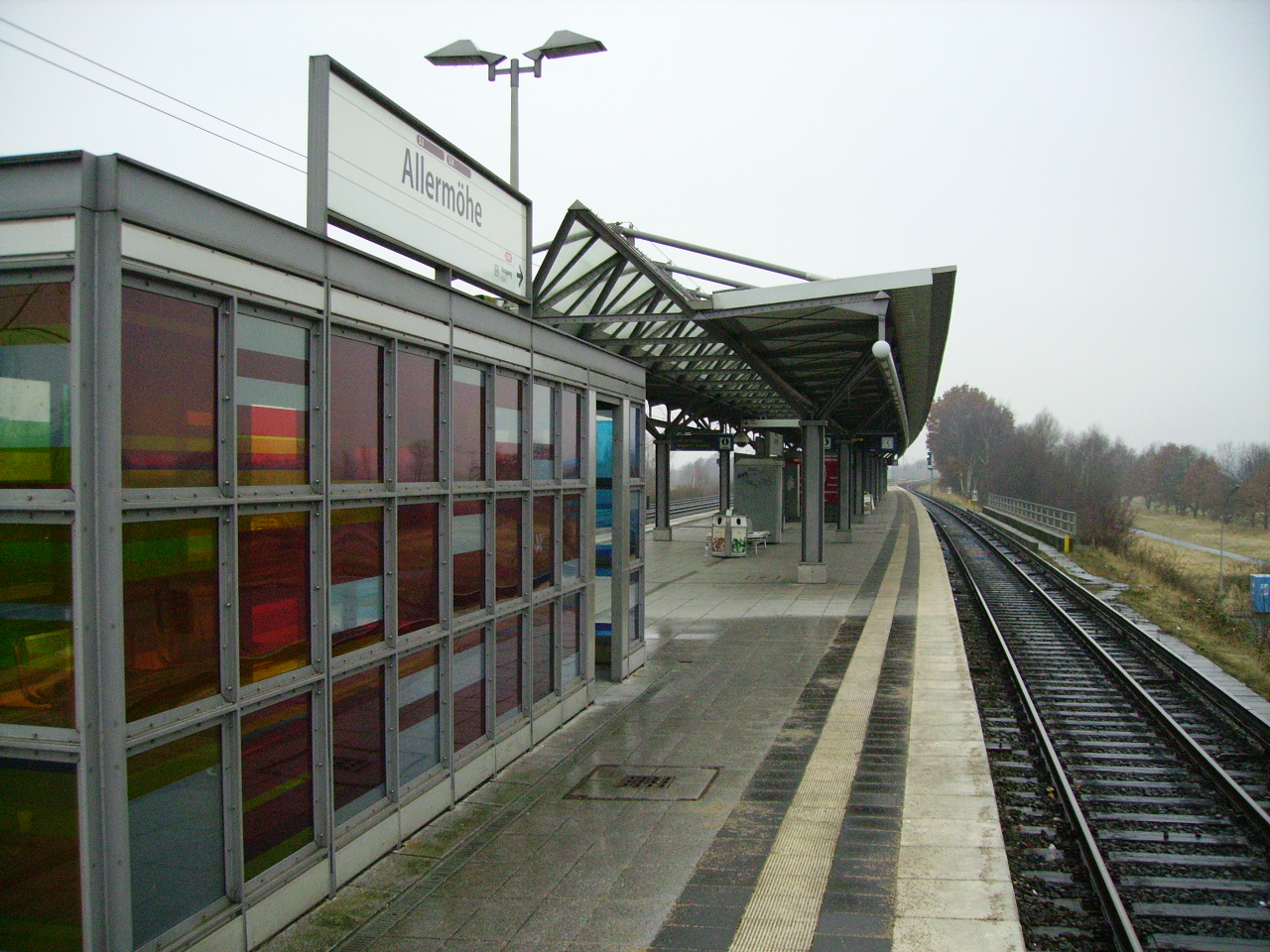
Platform of the Allermöhe station in February 2009.

Public transport is provided by buses and the rapid transit system of the S-Bahn, e.g. with the Allermöhe station.

The exits Hamburg-Allermöhe and Hamburg-Neuallermöhe West of the motorway A 25 service Allermöhe, connecting southwestern Hamburg to Geesthacht. According to the Department of Motor Vehicles (Kraftfahrt-Bundesamt), in the quarter 5,308 private cars were registered (355 cars/1000 people).

== Notes ==
=== References ===
- Statistical office Hamburg and Schleswig-Holstein Statistisches Amt für Hamburg und Schleswig-Holstein, official website (in German)
