= Altengamme =

- Quarter of Hamburg
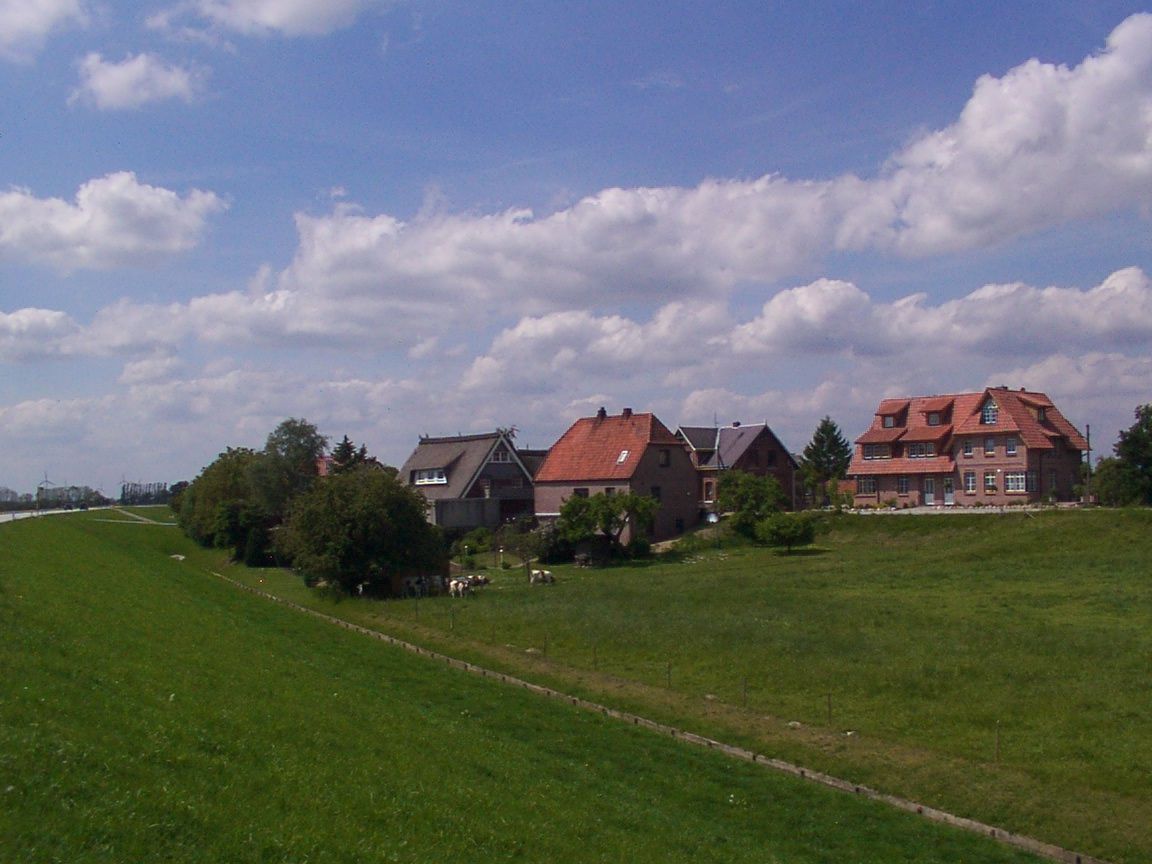
- Some houses at the old dike at Altengamme

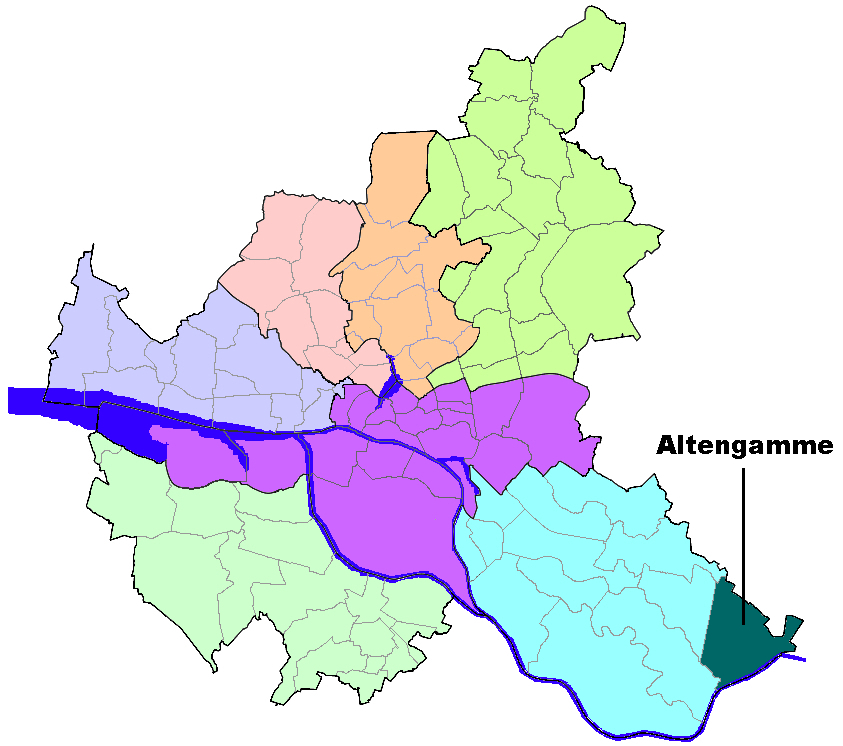
- Location of Altengamme in the city of Hamburg
- Interactive map of Altengamme
- Location within Germany Location within Hamburg
- Coordinates: 53°25′29″N 10°15′45″E
- Country: Germany
- State: Hamburg
- City: Hamburg
- Borough: Bergedorf

Area
  - Total: 15.6 km^{2} (6.0 sq mi)

Population (2024-12-31)
  - Total: 2,332
  - Density: 149/km^{2} (387/sq mi)
- Time zone: UTC+01:00 (CET)
  - Summer (DST): UTC+02:00 (CEST)
- Dialling codes: 040
- Vehicle registration: HH

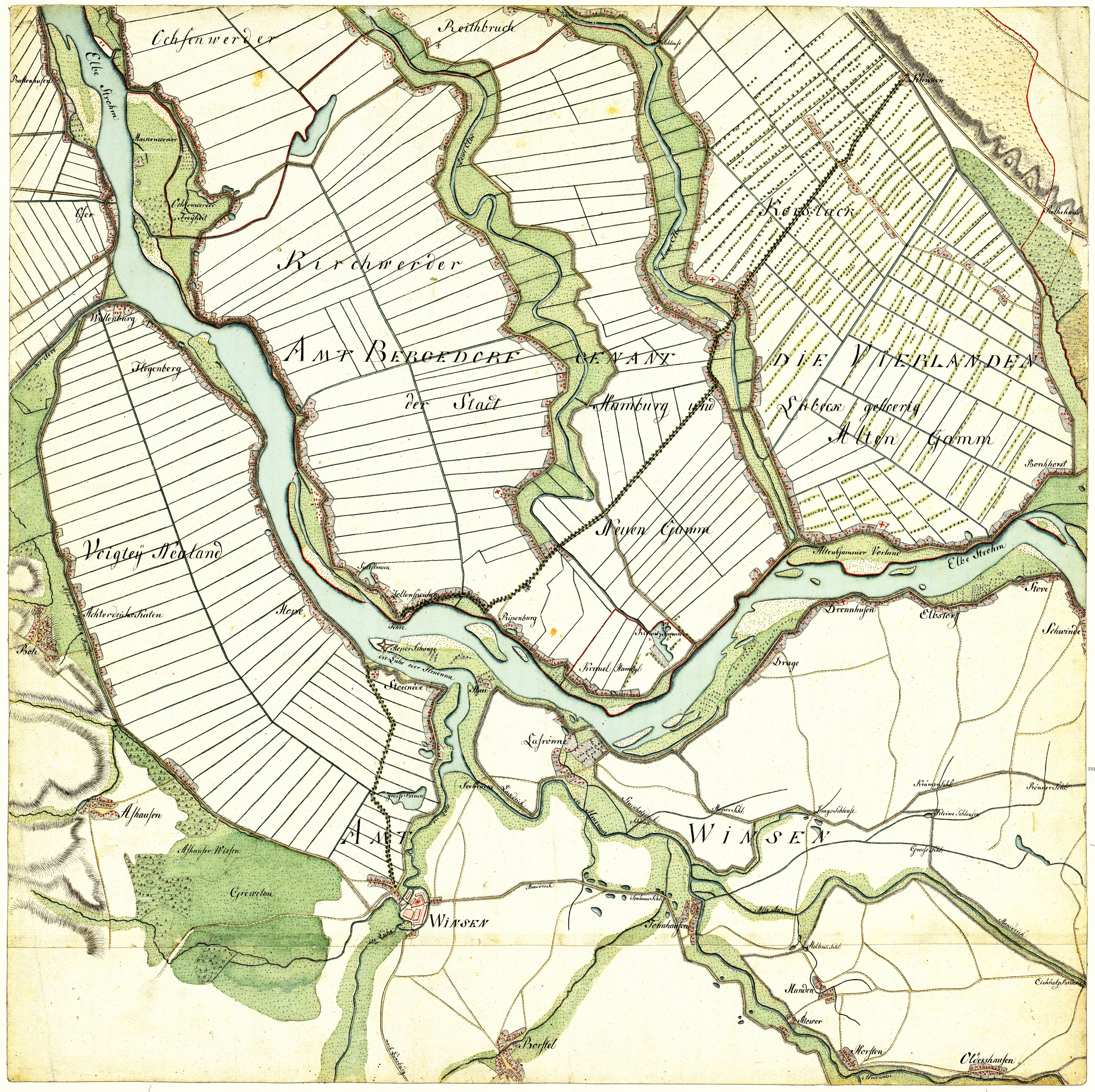
Altengamme about 1790 (Historical map of Gustav Adolf von Varendorf)

Altengamme (German pronunciation: [altn̩ˈɡamə], lit. 'Old Gamme', in contrast to "New Gamme") located in the Bergedorf borough of the Free and Hanseatic City of Hamburg in northern Germany, is a rural quarter on the right bank of the Elbe river. Altengamme is the most eastern part of Hamburg. In 2023 the population was 2,345.

== Geography ==
The quarter has a total area of 15.6 km^{2}. The quarter consists of the settlements Altengamme and Borghorst and the surrounding farm land. The western border is to the quarters Curslack and Neuengamme, with the river Dove Elbe as its border. In the East and North is the state Schleswig-Holstein with the district of Lauenburg. In the South the river Elbe is the border to Lower Saxony with the district Harburg. It is a part of the Vierlande area.

== Demographics ==
The population density was 141/km^{2} (365/sq mi). 19.3% were children under the age of 18, and 19.7% were 65 years of age or older. 1.9% were immigrants. 43 people were registered as unemployed and 753 were employees subject to social insurance contributions.

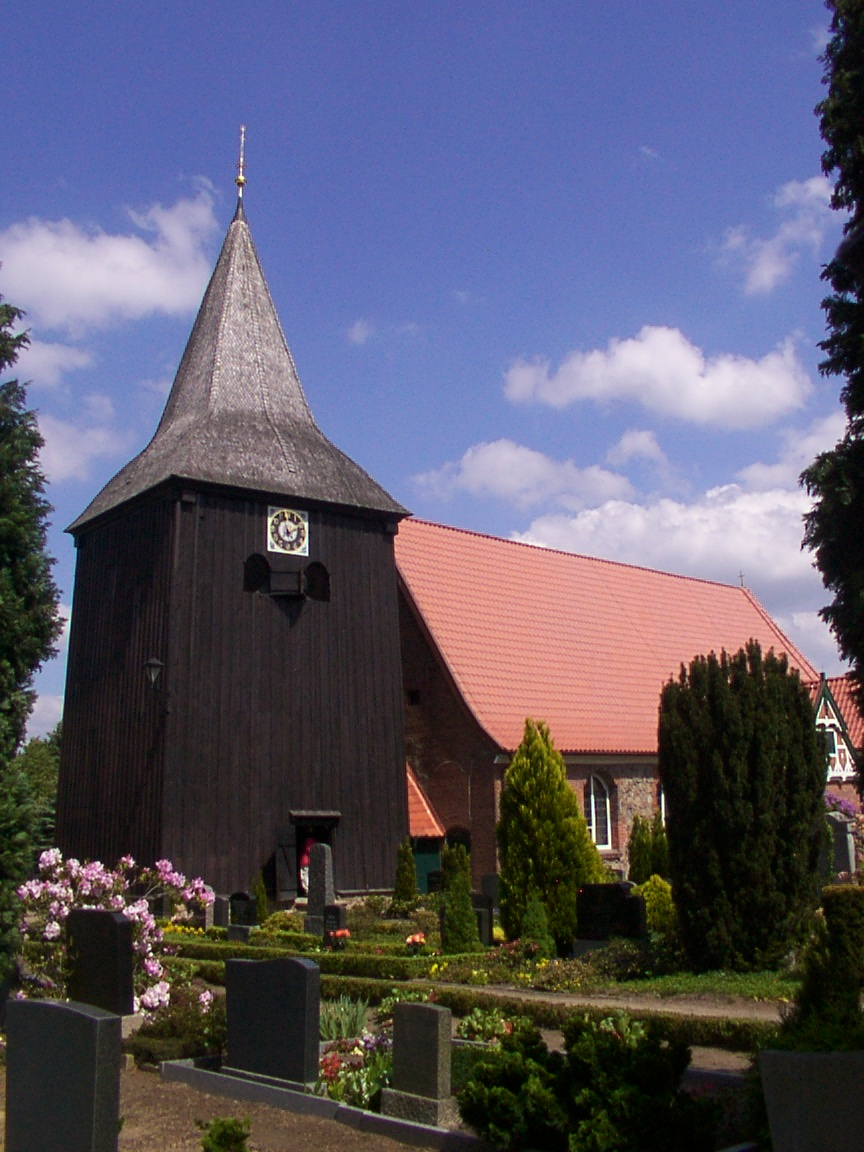
Church St. Nicolai

In 1999 there were 854 households, out of which 30% had children under the age of 18 living with them and 21.3% of all households were made up of individuals. The average household size was 2.5.

In 2006 there were 52 criminal offences (24 crimes per 1000 people).

=== Population by year ===
The population is counted by the residential registration office for 31 December each year.

1987	1988	1989	1990	1991	1992	1993	1994	1995	1996
1,997	1,984	1,969	1,994	2,012	2,034	2,040	2,049	2,055	2,070

1997	1998	1999	2000	2001	2002	2003	2004	2005	2006
2,083	2,096	2,097	2,107	2,123	2,132	2,140	2,135	2,198	2,198

2007	2008	2009	2010	2011
2,220	2,194	2,192	2,171	2,204

== Education ==
There was one elementary school and no secondary school in Altengamme.

== Politics ==
These are the results of Altengamme in the Hamburg state election:

Year	SPD	Greens	CDU	Left	AfD	FDP	Others
2020	37,6 %	19,3 %	16,7 %	7,5 %	5,8 %	5,1 %	8,0 %
2015	45,3 %	12,5 %	21,1 %	4,1 %	5,2 %	7,5 %	4,3 %
2011	49,4 %	9,7 %	28,4 %	3,4 %	–	5,7 %	3,4 %
2008	31,0 %	9,5 %	49,1 %	3,2 %	–	4,8 %	2,5 %
2004	26,3 %	8,7 %	55,5 %	–	–	4,3 %	5,2 %
2001	35,0 %	7,1 %	35,8 %	0,2 %	–	4,6 %	17,4 %
1997	32,4 %	12,4 %	39,2 %	0,0 %	–	3,8 %	12,2 %
1993	40,8 %	9,7 %	34,0 %	–	–	4,2 %	11,3 %

== Infrastructure ==
=== Health systems ===
In Altengamme are one day care center for children, three physicians in private practice and no pharmacy.

=== Transportation ===
Altengamme is not serviced by the rapid transit system of the city train or the underground railway. Public transport is provided by buses.

According to the Department of Motor Vehicles (Kraftfahrt-Bundesamt), in the quarter were 1,185 private cars registered (539 cars/1000 people). There were 5 traffic accidents total, all 5 traffic accidents with damage to persons.

== Notes ==
=== References ===
- Statistical office Hamburg and Schleswig-Holstein Statistisches Amt für Hamburg und Schleswig-Holstein, official website (in German)
