= Neuengamme, Hamburg =

- Quarter of Hamburg
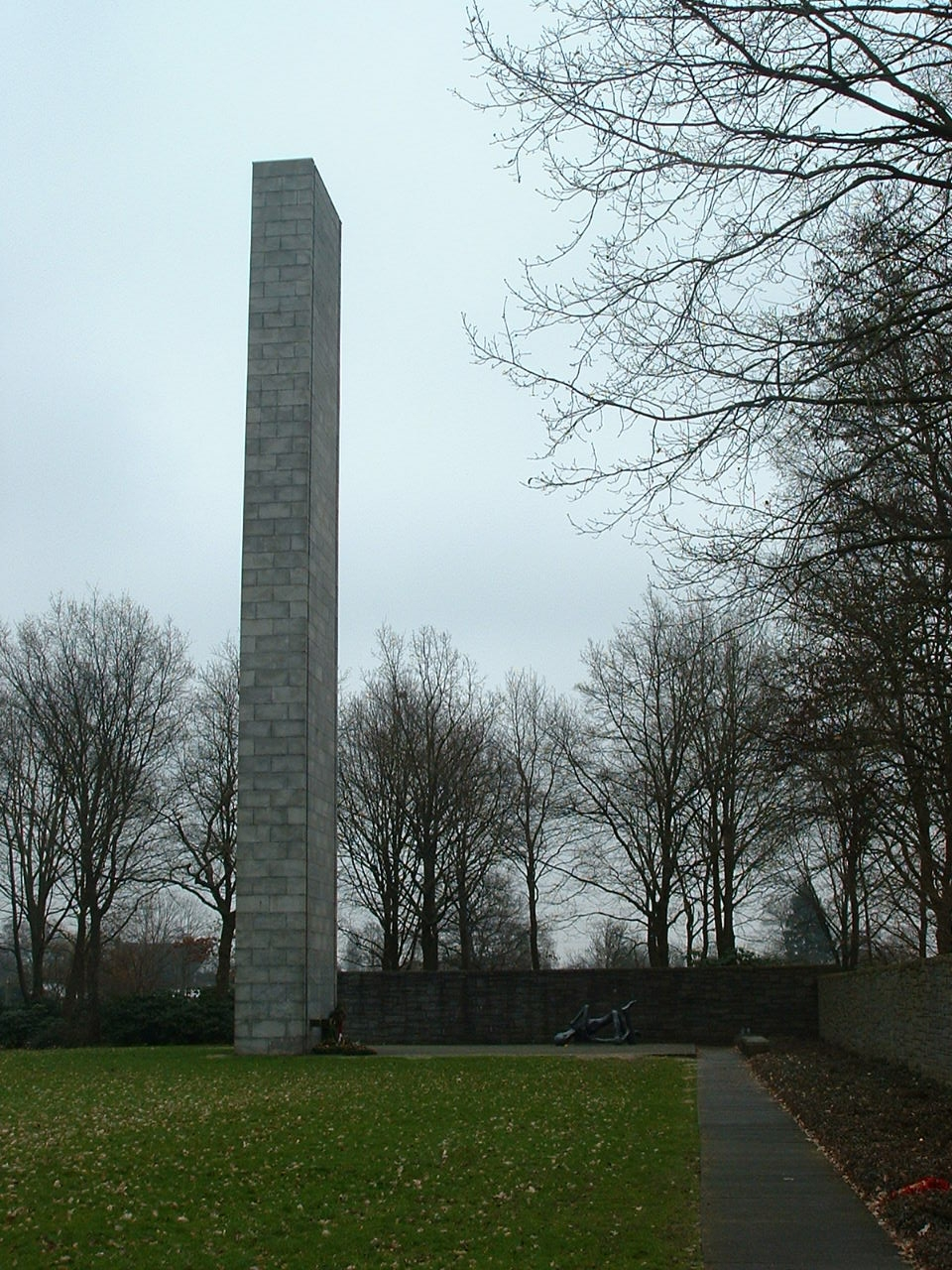
- The memorial tower at the former Neuengamme concentration camp.

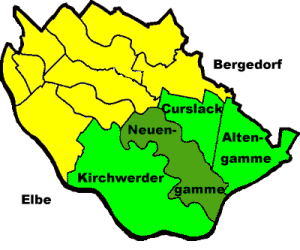
- Location of Neuengamme in Bergedorf borough
- Interactive map of Neuengamme, Hamburg
- Location within Germany Location within Hamburg
- Coordinates: 53°25′50″N 10°14′01″E
- Country: Germany
- State: Hamburg
- City: Hamburg
- Borough: Bergedorf

Area
  - Total: 18.6 km^{2} (7.2 sq mi)

Population (2024-12-31)
  - Total: 3,731
  - Density: 201/km^{2} (520/sq mi)
- Time zone: UTC+01:00 (CET)
  - Summer (DST): UTC+02:00 (CEST)
- Dialling codes: 040
- Vehicle registration: HH

Neuengamme (German pronunciation: [nɔʏənˈɡamə], lit. 'New Gamme', in contrast to "Old Gamme") is a quarter of Hamburg, Germany, located in the Bergedorf borough, near the river Dove Elbe (a tributary of the river Elbe). In this rural quarter, part of the Vierlande, the population in 2020 was 3,711.

During Nazi Germany, Neuengamme concentration camp was located in Neuengamme.

== Geography ==
Neuengamme is located in the southeastern part of Hamburg. In 2007 the quarter had a total area of 18.6 km^{2}.

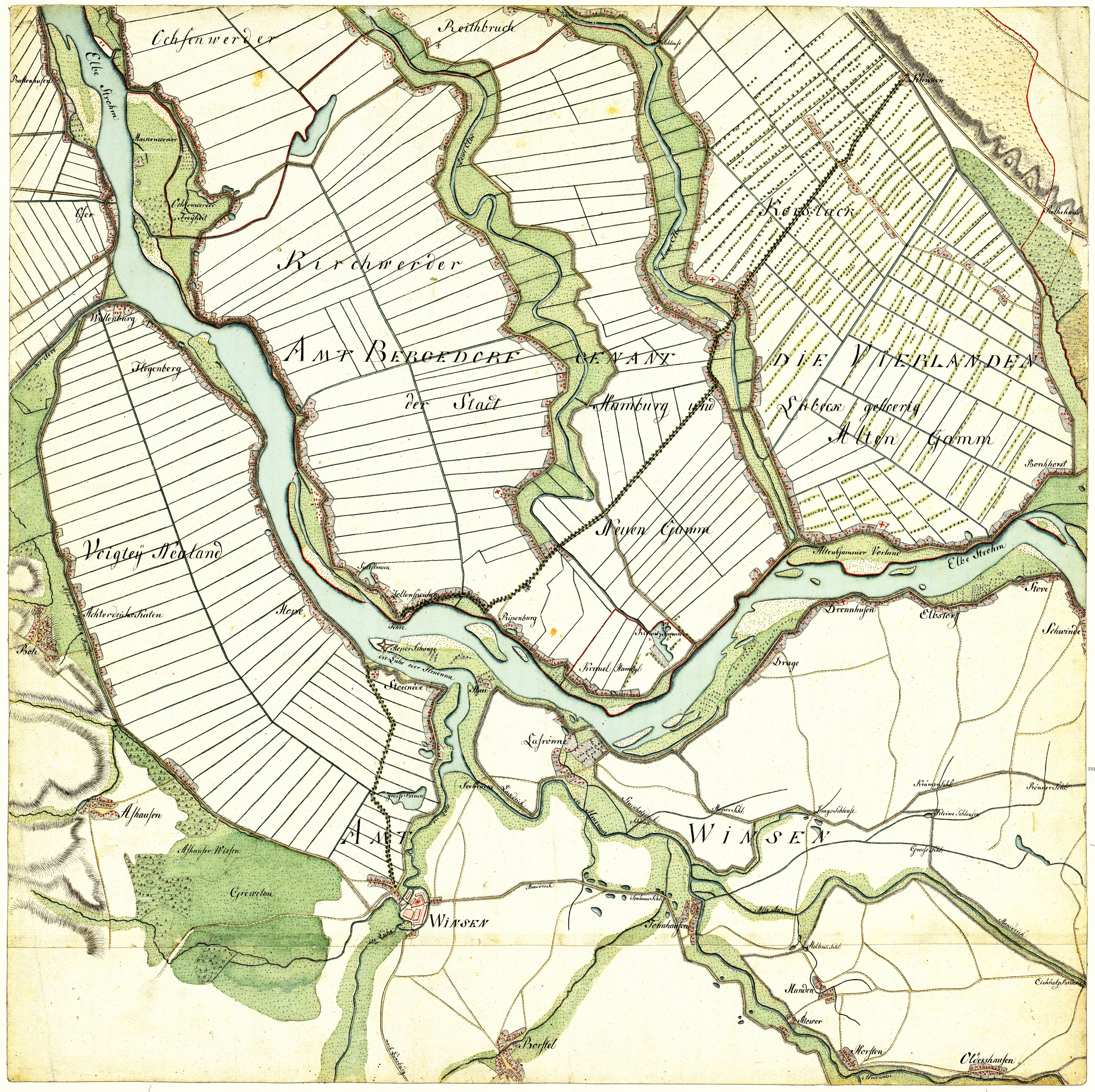
Neuengamme about 1790 (Historical map of Gustav Adolf von Varendorf)

== History ==
From December 1938 through May 1945, the concentration camp at Neuengamme (German: Konzentrationslager Neuengamme) had more than 106,000 inmates—including all sub camps—almost half of them died.

== Demographics ==
In 2010, 3,479 people were living in Neuengamme quarter. The population density was 168 people per km^{2}. 17.7% were children under the age of 18, and 20.2% were 65 years of age or older. 2.3% were immigrants. 54 people were registered as unemployed.

== Politics ==
These are the results of Neuengamme in the Hamburg state election:

State Election	SPD	CDU	Greens	Left	AfD	FDP	Others
2025	32,5 %	34,8 %	8,2 %	5,2 %	11,9 %	1,8 %	5,8 %
2020	39,8 %	19,5 %	16,8 %	6,4 %	5,5 %	4,6 %	7,4 %
2015	45,9 %	22,5 %	9,0 %	3,9 %	7,3 %	8,2 %	3,2 %
2011	43,8 %	33,8 %	8,2 %	3,3 %	–	6,3 %	4,6 %
2008	23,9 %	58,3 %	7,3 %	2,8 %	–	4,7 %	3,0 %

== Education ==
In 2007, there were no schools in Neuengamme.

== Notes ==
=== References ===
- Statistical office Hamburg and Schleswig-Holstein Statistisches Amt für Hamburg und Schleswig-Holstein, official website (in German)
