= 1371 =

1371 in various calendars
- Gregorian calendar: 1371; MCCCLXXI
- Ab urbe condita: 2124
- Armenian calendar: 820; ԹՎ ՊԻ
- Assyrian calendar: 6121
- Balinese saka calendar: 1292–1293
- Bengali calendar: 777–778
- Berber calendar: 2321
- English Regnal year: 44 Edw. 3 – 45 Edw. 3
- Buddhist calendar: 1915
- Burmese calendar: 733
- Byzantine calendar: 6879–6880
- Chinese calendar: 庚戌年 (Metal Dog); 4068 or 3861 — to — 辛亥年 (Metal Pig); 4069 or 3862
- Coptic calendar: 1087–1088
- Discordian calendar: 2537
- Ethiopian calendar: 1363–1364
- Hebrew calendar: 5131–5132
- Hindu calendars
- Vikram Samvat: 1427–1428
- Shaka Samvat: 1292–1293
- Kali Yuga: 4471–4472
- Holocene calendar: 11371
- Igbo calendar: 371–372
- Iranian calendar: 749–750
- Islamic calendar: 772–773
- Japanese calendar: Ōan 4 (応安４年)
- Javanese calendar: 1284–1285
- Julian calendar: 1371; MCCCLXXI
- Korean calendar: 3704
- Minguo calendar: 541 before ROC 民前541年
- Nanakshahi calendar: −97
- Thai solar calendar: 1913–1914
- Tibetan calendar: ལྕགས་ཕོ་ཁྱི་ལོ་ (male Iron-Dog); 1497 or 1116 or 344 — to — ལྕགས་མོ་ཕག་ལོ་ (female Iron-Boar); 1498 or 1117 or 345

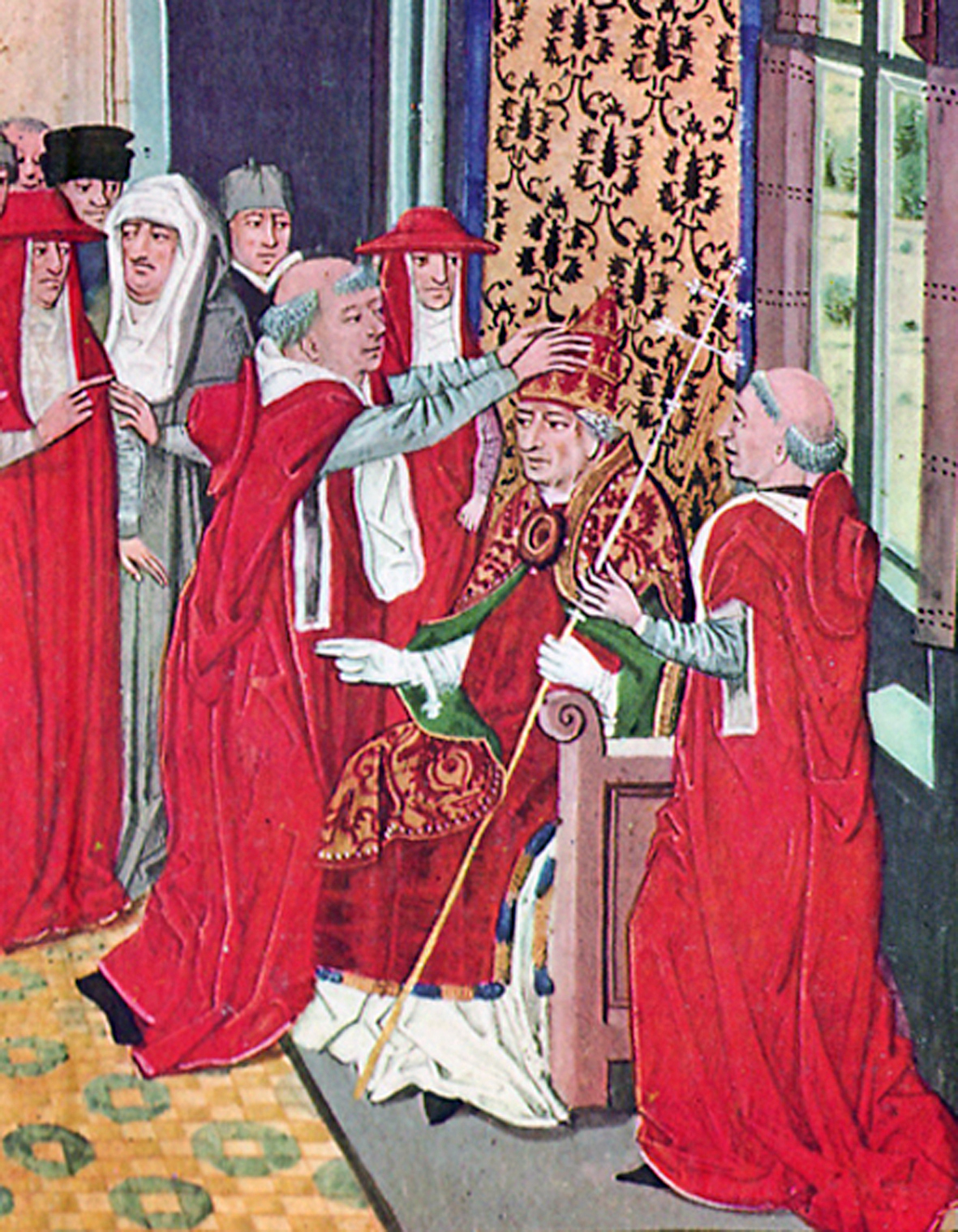
January 8: Pope Gregory XI is crowned at Avignon.

Year 1371 (MCCCLXXI) was a common year starting on Wednesday of the Julian calendar.

== Events ==
=== January–March ===
- January 5 – Six days after his election to lead the Roman Catholic Church, Pierre Roger de Beaufort is crowned as Pope Gregory XI. The coronation is performed by the protodeacon Rinaldo Orsini at the Avignon Cathedral.
- January 8 – King Edward III summons the members of the House of Lords and House of Commons to assemble at Westminster for a one-month session of the English Parliament.
- January – Edward the Black Prince, gives up the administration of Aquitaine and returns to England, because of his poor health and heavy debts.
- February 1 – War of the Lüneburg Succession: In what is now the state of Lower Saxony in north Germany, after the Duke of Brunswick, Magnus Torquatus, attempts to claim his inheritance to rule of the Principality of Lüneburg, residents of the town of Lüneburg destroy the ducal castle that had been owned by the late Prince Wilhelm, and Brunswick relocates his residence to the town of Celle.
- February 17 – Rival brothers Ivan Sratsimir and Ivan Shishman become co-Emperors of Bulgaria after the death of their father, Ivan Alexander. Bulgaria is weakened by the split.
- February 22 – Robert II becomes the first Stuart king of Scotland, after the death of his uncle, King David II, prompting a rebellion by the Earl of Douglas.
- February 24 – The English Parliament opens its session at Westminster.
- March 26 – The coronation of Robert II as King of Scotland takes place at Scone Abbey.
- March 28 – The London Charterhouse, a Carthusian monastery, is founded in Aldersgate.
- March 29 – The English Parliament closes and King Edward III gives royal assent to laws passed during its session, including the confirmation of the Great Charter of the Forest, as well as defining "the penalty of him that setteth up or enhanceth wares" and a ban against enforcement, without consent, of the law of sylva caedua, a tithe to the church of a portion of any timber of 20 years growth.

=== April–June ===
- April 9 – Emperor Go-En'yu of Japan succeeds Emperor Go-Kōgon of the Northern Court of Japan.
- May 17 – The Lordship of Milan expands its holdings when Feltrino Gonzaga sells almost all of his holdings of Reggio di Lombardia to the Lords Galeazzo and Bernabo Visconti, with the exception of Novellara and Bagnolo.
- May 30 – Pope Gregory XI names 12 new Roman Catholic cardinals to supplement the existing 20 living cardinals. The new cardinals at Avignon include Robert de Geneve who will become the first antipope of the Western Schism.
- May – Under the direction of Zhu Yuanzhang, the Emperor Hongwu, the Ming conquest of Xia begins as troops from China, led by Generals Fu Youde and Tang He invade what is now the Sichuan province from the north, while Admiral Liao Yongzhong leads an attack on Xia's east coast and along the Yangtze river.
- June 24 – In punishment for his malfeasance as regent during the reign of King David II, the property of William III, Earl of Ross at Inverness is confiscated by King Robert II.

=== July–September ===
- July 21 – John of Gaunt, Duke of Lancaster, resigns his command from the English Army and abandons the attempt to recapture the Duchy of Aquitaine, but remains in France.
- August 22 – Brabant is unexpectedly defeated by the Duchy of Jülich at the Battle of Baesweiler.
- September 21 – John of Gaunt, son of King Edward III of England, marries Constance of Castile, daughter of King Pedro of Castile, giving John a claim to the throne of Castile.
- September 26 – In the Battle of Maritsa, troops led by Lala Shahin Pasha and Hacı İlbey from the Ottoman Empire overwhelm and kill most of the Serbian defenders, including King Vukašin, his brother Prince Jovan Uglješa, and most of the lords of the Mrnjavčević family. The victory paves the way for the Ottoman Empire to expand into the Balkan Peninsula.

=== October–December ===
- October 21 – An attempt on Saint Ursula's Day by the Duke of Brunswick, to defeat the uprising in the principality of Luneberg and to reclaim his title, is unsuccessful.
- November 18 – Shen-Chi and Chang-Jhing-Chi, diplomatic envoys from China, land in Java to deliver a message from the Chinese Emperor to Muhammad Shah of Brunei.
- November 26 – In the Kingdom of Goryeo (now sections of North Korea and South Korea), King Gongmin names his Shin-Bi as his royal consort and primary wife.
- December 4 – Stefan Uroš V, the Tsar of Serbia and King of the Greeks since 1346, dies childless at the age of 35. Marko Mrnjavčević, the young son of the late co-ruler of Serbia, King Vukasin, is designated as the nominal Emperor, although Prince Lazar Hrebeljanović controls most of the remaining territory of the Serbian Empire.

=== Date unknown ===
- The first widely accepted historical reference is made to playing cards (in Spain).
- Polish priest Andrzej Jastrzębiec becomes the first bishop of Siret, thus bringing Catholicism to Moldavia.
- Zhao Bing Fa becomes King of Mong Mao (in modern-day south China/north Myanmar) after the death of his father, Si Kefa.
- Kalamegha claims the vacant title of King of Cambodia after the power of the Thai invaders from Ayutthaya begins to weaken. The Ayutthayans are finally expelled in 1375.
- Byzantine co-emperor John V Palaiologos pledges loyalty to the Ottoman Empire, to prevent the Turks from invading Constantinople.
- The Hongwu Emperor of the Ming dynasty in China introduces the census registration system of lijia, or the hundreds-and-tithing system, throughout the Yangzi Valley. This system groups households into units of ten and groups of one hundred, whereupon their capacities for paying taxes and providing the state with corvée labor service can be assessed. The system becomes fully operational in 1381, when it counts 59,873,305 people living in China (the historian Timothy Brook asserts that the number was much higher, somewhere between 65 million and 75 million).

== Births ==
- May 28 – John the Fearless, Duke of Burgundy (d. 1419)
- September 21 – Frederick I, Elector of Brandenburg (d. 1440)
- December 30 – Prince Vasily I of Moscow (d. 1425)
- date unknown
  - Leopold IV, Duke of Austria (d. 1411)
  - Sophia of Lithuania, regent of Lithuania (d. 1453)
  - Zheng He, Chinese mariner and explorer (d. 1433)
- probable – Isabeau de Bavière, queen of Charles VI of France (d. 1435)

== Deaths ==
- January/February – Paul, Latin Patriarch of Constantinople
- February 17 – Ivan Alexander of Bulgaria
- February 22 – David II of Scotland (b. 1324)
- March 4 – Jeanne d'Évreux, queen consort of France (b. 1310)
- September – Thomas de Vere, 8th Earl of Oxford (b. c. 1336)
- September 26 – Jovan Uglješa, Serbian despot
- September 26 – Vukašin Mrnjavčević, Serbian king
