= Rudolf II of Saxe-Wittenberg =

Elector of Saxony from 1356 to 1370

Rudolf II
- Duke of Saxe-Wittenberg
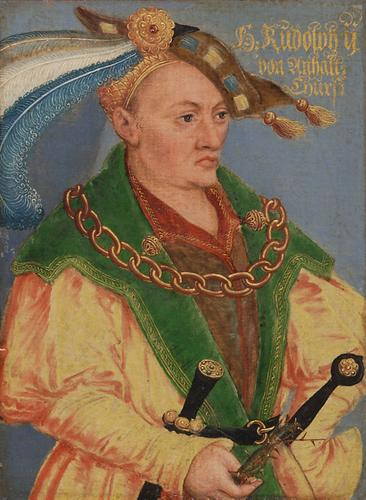
- Portrait by Lucas Cranach the Younger

Elector of Saxony
- Reign: 12 March 1356 – 6 December 1370
- Predecessor: Rudolf I
- Successor: Wenceslaus I
- Born: c. 1307
- Died: 6 December 1370; Wittenberg
- Burial: Castle Church in Wittenberg
- Spouse: Elisabeth of Hesse
- House: Ascania
- Father: Rudolf I, Duke of Saxe-Wittenberg
- Mother: Judith of Brandenburg-Salzwedel

Rudolf II, Duke of Saxe-Wittenberg, nicknamed Rudolf the Blind, (c. 1307 – 6 December 1370 in Wittenberg) was a member of the House of Ascania. He was Elector of Saxony and Duke of Saxe-Wittenberg from 1356 until his death. He was the eldest son of Duke Rudolf I of Saxe-Wittenberg and his wife, Judith of Brandenburg-Salzwedel.

== Life ==
Rudolf II acted in the diplomatic service of his father from an early age.

On 25 August 1345, he fought on the side of King Philip VI of France in the Battle of Crécy. After King John of Bohemia died, Rudolf II took over the leadership of the German auxiliary troops. Although the French lost the battle, Philip VI thanked Rudolf II and gave him a bloody thorn that was said to have been part of the Crown of Thorns. In those days, relics were deeply venerated and such a gift was very valuable. It was even valuable economically, as the place where such a relic was kept, drew large numbers of pilgrims, providing a steady stream of revenue. His father and stepmother had built a basilica chapel in the All Saints' Church in Wittenberg. Due to the acquisition of the relic, this chapel evolved into the seat of a provost. After his father's death, Rudolf II reaffirmed the Church's rights and expanded its possessions.

When Rudolf I felt he was too old to travel to the Imperial Diet, he gave Rudolf II the power to represent him at the Diet. After Rudolf I died on 12 March 1356, Rudolf II asked the imperial court in Metz on 27 December 1356 to reaffirm the rights of the Saxe-Wittenberg line of the House of Ascania, against opposing claims from the Saxe-Lauenburg line.

Rudolf II continued his father's policies. Like his father, he had to deal with claims on the Saxon electoral vote by the Saxe-Lauenburg line, and on the County of Brehna by the Margraves of Meissen of the House of Wettin, which had once held Brehna. When the Wettins also began to question his rights to Herzberg, Prettin, Trebnitz, Klöden, Pretzsch, Schmiedeberg and other possessions, he had to respond militarily. This conflict and other political activities drained his financial resources. In 1359, he sold the city of Allstedt to Gebhard XIV of Querfurt and exchanged Gatterslaben Castle with Archbishop Dietrich of Magdeburg for Wiesenburg Castle and Schweinitz.

=== Territorial acquisitions ===
In 1360, he acquire the Lordship of LIebenwerda, which bounded his territory on the east side. In 1370, he acquired the County of Barby with Walternien Castle, which he gave to the Barby family as a fief.

In 1369, William II, the last Prince of Lüneburg died and Emperor Charles IV ruled that the Principality of Lüneburg was a completed fief and awarded it to Albert, who was a grandson of William II via his mother and a nephew of Rudolf II via his father. Duke Magnus II Torquatus of Brunswick-Wolfenbüttel disagreed with this outcome, which led to the Lüneburg War of Succession, which lasted long after Rudolf II's death.

=== Domestic policies ===
A major theme of his domestic political activities was his endeavour to secure his revenues. For example, he gave the city of Herzberg the right to mine salt and protected the salt route via Halle and Bitterfeld to Torgau. In order to combat robber barons, he outlawed such practices and concluded alliances with other cities. In 1358, during his reign, he destroyed Ließnitz castle, a den of robbers on the site where the city of Kropstädt would later be built. He arbitrated in a dispute between the Castle Church and the City Church of Wittenberg.

From 1370, he styled himself Elector of Saxony, a title he had been granted by the Golden Bull of 1356. Towards the end of his life, he almost completely lost his eyesight, which earned him the nickname Rudolf the Blind.

== Death ==
Rudolf II died on 6 December 1370. As he had no sons or male-line grandsons, he was succeeded by his younger brother, Wenceslas I.

During excavations at the site of a former Franciscan monastery in Wittenberg in 2009, Rudolf's grave was discovered by archaeologists. He had been buried in a wooden coffin, next to his wife and daughter. His sword and his lead seal had been put in his grave.

== Marriage and issue ==
Before 8 May 1336, Rudolf II married Elisabeth (d. 30 May 1373, buried at Wittenberg Franciscan monastery), the daughter of Landgrave Otto of Hesse. They had one daughter:

- Elisabeth (d. young 1353, buried at Wittenberg Franciscan Monastery).

Sources (including German Wikipedia) named a second marriage with Elisabeth (d. 15 November 1373), the daughter of Count Ulrich II of Lindow-Ruppin, and the existence of a son, Albert, who died soon after birth in 1371. However, this seems unlikely, because the findings at Wittenberg monastery on 2009 showed that Rudolf II was buried with his Hessian wife (presumably the only one because no trace of other grave from another consort was found) and one daughter (who also discarted the existence of a second daughter born from the "first" marriage, Beate, who died ca. 1373).

== Ancestors ==
Ancestors of Rudolf II of Saxe-Wittenberg

16. Bernard III, Duke of Saxony
8. Albert I, Duke of Saxony
17. Judith of Poland
4. Albert II, Duke of Saxony
18. Otto I, Duke of Brunswick-Lüneburg
9. Helene of Brunswick-Lüneburg
19. Matilda of Brandenburg
2. Rudolf I, Duke of Saxe-Wittenberg
20. Albert IV, Count of Habsburg
10. Rudolf I of Germany
21. Heilwig of Kyburg
5. Agnes of Habsburg
22. Burckhard V, Count of Hohenburg
11. Gertrude of Hohenberg
23. Matilda of Tübingen
1. Rudolf II, Duke of Saxe-Wittenberg
24. Albert II, Margrave of Brandenburg
12. Otto III, Margrave of Brandenburg
25. Matilda of Lusatia
6. Otto V, Margrave of Brandenburg-Salzwedel
26. Wenceslaus I of Bohemia
13. Beatrice of Bohemia
27. Kunigunde of Hohenstaufen
3. Jutta of Brandenburg-Salzwedel
28. Poppo VII of Henneberg
14. Herman I, Count of Henneberg
29. Jutta of Thuringia
7. Judith of Henneberg-Coburg
30. Floris IV, Count of Holland
15. Margaret of Holland
31. Matilda of Brabant

== See also ==
- House of Ascania

Rudolf II of Saxe-Wittenberg House of Ascania Born: c. 1307 Died: 6 December 1370
Regnal titles
| Preceded by Rudolf I | Elector of Saxony; 1356–1370 | Succeeded by Wenceslas I |
