= Otto IV of Brunswick-Lüneburg =

Duke of Brunswick-Lüneburg

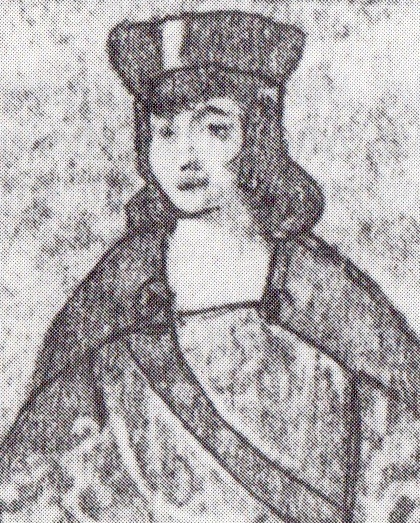
Otto the Lame

Otto IV, also known as Otto Crookleg or Otto the Lame (d 1446) Duke of Brunswick-Lüneburg, was Prince of Lüneburg from 1434 to 1446.

== Life ==
After the death of his father, Bernard, he took over as ruler of the Principality of Lüneburg jointly with his brother, Frederick the Pious. Their rule was marked by major building work to Celle Castle and also by numerous reforms which improved the legal situation of farmers vis-a-vis their local lords.

== Marriage ==
In 1425 Otto IV married Elisabeth of Eberstein (before 1415–1468) and had a daughter by her.

== Ancestors ==
Ancestors of Otto IV of Brunswick-Lüneburg

8. Magnus the Pious, Duke of Brunswick-Lüneburg
4. Magnus II, Duke of Brunswick-Lüneburg
9. Sophia of Brandenburg-Stendal
2. Bernard I, Duke of Brunswick-Lüneburg
10. Bernhard III, Prince of Anhalt-Bernburg
5. Catherine of Anhalt-Bernburg
11. Agnes of Saxony
1. Otto IV, Duke of Brunswick-Lüneburg
12. Rudolf I, Duke of Saxe-Wittenberg
6. Wenceslas I, Duke of Saxe-Wittenberg
13. Agnes of Lindow-Ruppin
3. Margaret of Saxony
14. Francesco I da Carrara
7. Cecilia of Carrara
15. Fina Buzzacarini

== Literature ==
- Geckler, Christa (1986). Die Celler Herzöge: Leben und Wirken 1371–1705. Celle: Georg Ströher. ISBN 3-921744-05-8. OCLC 255990175.

Otto IV of Brunswick-Lüneburg House of Welf Cadet branch of the House of Este Born: - Died: 1446
German nobility
Preceded by Bernard I	Duke of Brunswick-Lüneburg; Prince of Lüneburg joint reign with brother Frederick the Pious; 1434–1446	Succeeded by Frederick the Pious
