= Lüneburg Sate =

1392 treaty in the Principality of Lüneburg

Coat of arms of the Principality of Lüneburg

The Lüneburg Sate (German: Lüneburger Sate) or Treaty of Lüneburg (Sate is Low German for settlement or treaty) was a territorial agreement between the territorial lord (Landesherr; i.e. the Guelphic Prince of Lüneburg) and the estates (Landesstände) in the Principality of Lüneburg established in 1392.

The treaty established a legal body whose function was to secure the rights of its members. To this end, a court, called the Satekollegium, was formed. Membership of the rulers in this body was in return for the granting of a loan to the sum of 50,000 Mark löt in bonds and was tied to the duration of the loan so that the Lüneburg Sate was in effect a mortgage contract. Besides the actual Sate letter, the treaty included three other letters, which described in detail the rights of the individual estates. The Lüneburg Sate entered into force in 1392, but ended de facto after the Sate War in 1396. It was formally rescinded in 1519.

== History ==
After William II of Lüneburg died without male issue in 1369, the older House of Lüneburg became extinct. According to the rules of the House of Welf, Duke Magnus II Torquatus of Brunswick would have been entitled to inherit. Emperor Charles IV, however, regarded the imperial fief as having reverted to the Empire and enfeoffed Albert of Saxe-Wittenberg and his uncle Wenceslas with the principality, which triggered the Lüneburg War of Succession. Only after the Battle of Winsen in 1388, in which Wenceslas lost his life, did the Wittenbergers renounce their claims and the principality was finally secured for the Guelphs.

The Lüneburg War of Succession had led to a great deal of power among the estates in the principality. In order to secure the support of the cities and the lower nobility, both the Guelphs and the Ascanians were forced to grant extensive privileges to the estates and to grant them numerous rights and castles. Although the Celle dukes had emerged victorious from the conflict, they now had huge financial problems. When the dukes approached the city of Lüneburg with another financial request, in exchange for a loan of 50,000 marks, an extensive contract was concluded, in which numerous privileges were given to the estates, and the dukes submitted to the jurisdiction of a council (Gremium) formed by the estates.

== Sources ==
- Michael Reinbold: Die Lüneburger Sate. Ein Beitrag zur Verfassungsgeschichte Niedersachsens im späten Mittelalter. Lax, Hildesheim, 1987. ISBN 3-7848-3656-9
- Wilhelm Havemann: Geschichte der Lande Braunschweig und Lüneburg, Vol. 2, Nachdruck. Hirschheydt, Hanover, 1974/75, ISBN 3-7777-0843-7 (Original edition: Verlag der Dietrich'schen Buchhandlung, Göttingen, 1853–1857)
- Ernst Schubert (ed.): Politik, Verfassung, Wirtschaft vom 9. bis zum ausgehenden 15. Jahrhundert ISBN 3-7752-5900-7
- Klaus Friedland: Die Sate der braunschweigisch-lüneburgischen Landsstände von 1392 (Blätter für deutsche Landesgeschichte, Vol. 91, 1954)
