= Albert III of Saxe-Wittenberg =

Elector of Saxony from 1419 to 1422

Albert III
- Duke of Saxe-Wittenberg
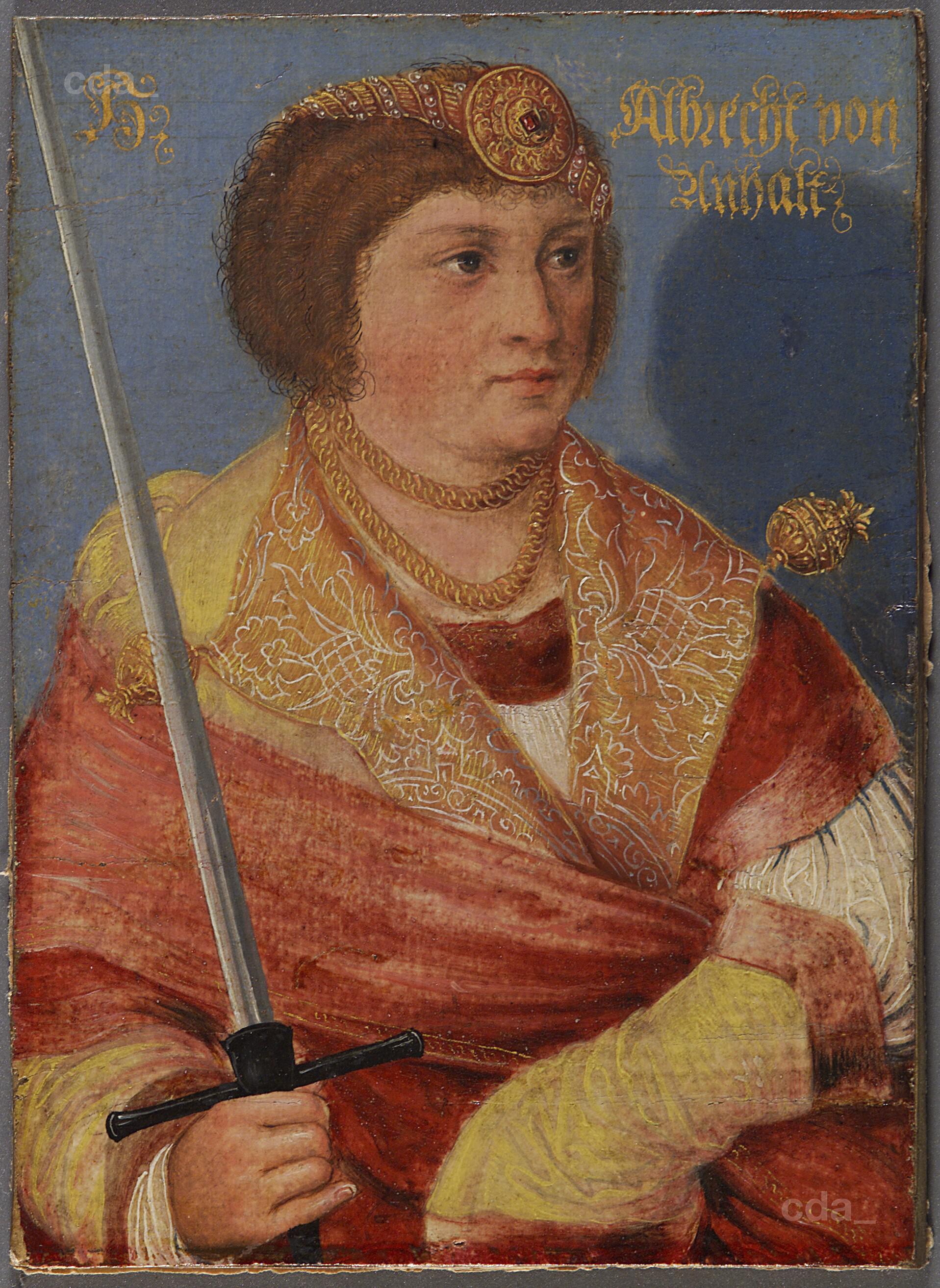
- Portrait by Lucas Cranach the Younger

Elector of Saxony
- Reign: 1419–1422
- Predecessor: Rudolf III
- Successor: Frederick I
- Born: c. 1383; Wittenberg, Saxony
- Died: before 12 November 1422; Wittenberg
- Spouse: Euphemia of Oels
- House: Ascania
- Father: Wenceslaus I, Duke of Saxe-Wittenberg
- Mother: Cecilia of Carrara

Albert III (German: Albrecht III.; c. 1375/1380 – before 12 November 1422) was the last Duke of Saxe-Wittenberg and Elector of Saxony from the House of Ascania. After his death, King Sigismund ceded his duchy and the Saxon electoral dignity to Margrave Frederick IV of Meissen from the House of Wettin.

== Life ==
Albert was probably born in the Saxon Wittenberg residence, the younger son of Duke Wenceslaus I, Duke of Saxe-Wittenberg and his wife Cecilia, daughter of Francesco I da Carrara, Lord of Padua.

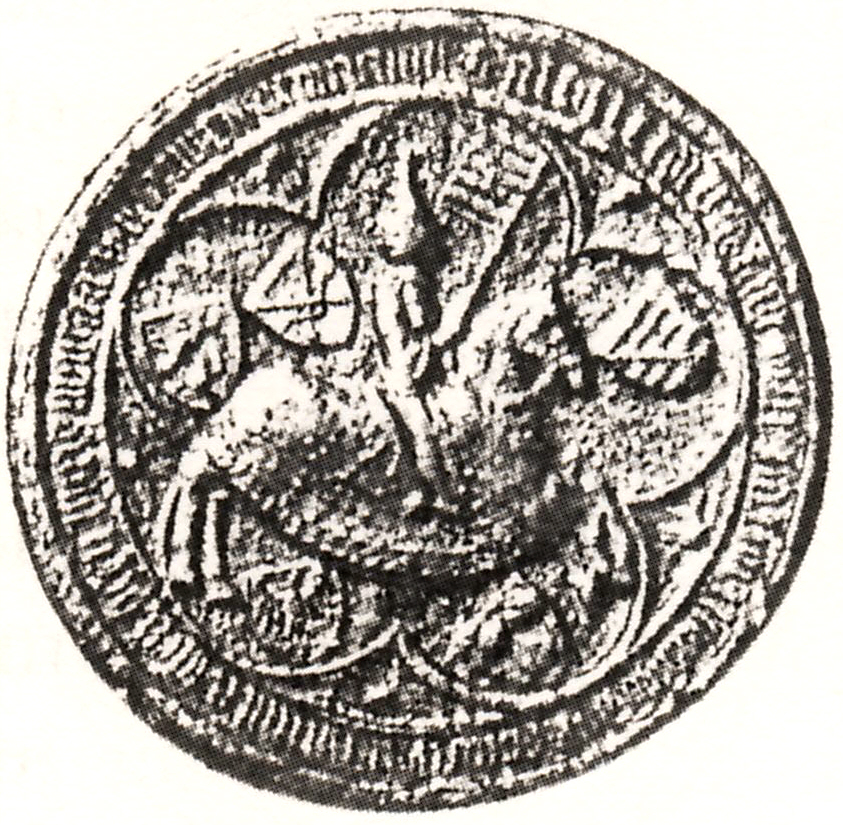
Seal of Duke Albert III of Saxe-Wittenberg

He first appeared in written documents in 1407. When his elder brother, Elector Rudolf III was poisoned in 1419, Albert took over the rule of Saxe-Wittenberg. Also known as "Albert the Poor", he inherited a land exhausted by the War of the Lüneburg Succession and Rudolf's long-time feud with the Archbishops of Magdeburg. With an empty state purse, he could scarcely afford any servants and led a very lonely life.

In order to generate some income, he controversially imposed the right to charge stall taxes on markets in the town of Wittenberg in 1421. He got into such conflict with the citizens that it almost led to an armed clash, as this right had belonged to the town for generations. Finally the Hohenzollern elector Frederick of Brandenburg was called in to referee the dispute. He decided that the behaviour of the townsfolk to their lord was inappropriate, but supported their market rights on condition that an apology was tendered to Albert.

In the third year of his reign the prince-elector died as a result of an accidental fire in a farmhouse on the Lochau Heath near Annaburg, where he was overnighting with his wife during a hunt. The fire came so close to them that he and his wife, dressed only in nightshirts had to be rescued through a window. Several of his servants died in the flames.

The prince-elector was so shocked by this incident that he died a few days later in Wittenberg. He was buried in the Franciscan chapel there. With his death, the Ascanian rule in Saxe-Wittenberg came to an end.

== Marriage ==
Albert married Euphemia of Oels, a daughter of the Piast duke Konrad III the Old on 14 January 1420. This marriage remained childless.

In 1422 his widow was given Liebenwerda Castle as her wittum (Leibgedinge). In 1432, she secondly married Prince George I, Prince of Anhalt-Dessau. She died in 1444.

== Ancestors ==
Ancestors of Albert III of Saxe-Wittenberg

16. Albert I, Duke of Saxony
8. Albert II, Duke of Saxony
17. Helen of Brunswick-Lünenburg
4. Rudolf I, Duke of Saxe-Wittenberg
18. Rudolph I of Germany
9. Agnes of Habsburg
19. Gertrude of Hohenberg
2. Wenceslas I, Duke of Saxe-Wittenberg
20. Günther I, Count of Lindow
10. Ulrich I, Count of Lindow-Ruppin
21. Euphemia of Rügen
5. Agnes of Lindow-Ruppin
22. Meinher, Count of Schladen
11. Adelaide of Schladen
23. Adelaide of Werberg
1. Albert III, Duke of Saxe-Wittenberg
24. Niccolo da Carrara
12. Jacopo II da Carrara
25. Elena Torre
6. Francesco I da Carrara
26. Guido II Novello da Polenta, signore di Ravenna
13. Costanza da Polenta dei Signori di Ravenna
27. Caterina Malabocca
3. Cecilia of Carrara
28. Dusio Buzzacarini
14. Pataro Buzzacarini
7. Fina Buzzacarini
15. Francesca Gonzaga

Albert III of Saxe-Wittenberg House of Ascania Born: c. 1375/1380 Died: before 12 November 1422
Regnal titles
Preceded by Rudolf III	Elector of Saxony; 1419–1422	Succeeded by Frederick I
