= William II of Brunswick-Lüneburg =

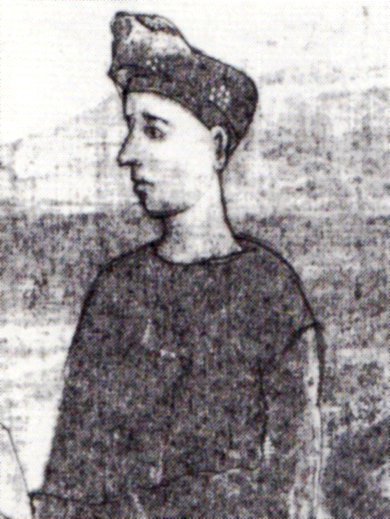
William II

William II, Duke of Brunswick-Lüneburg (about 1300 – 1369) was the Prince of Lüneburg from 1330 to 1369.

== Life ==
=== Joint rule with Otto III ===
William was born around the year 1300 as the fourth child of Otto the Strict and his wife, Matilda of Bavaria.
On his father's death, William took over the reins of state jointly with his brother Otto III. This was against his father's will because Otto II had wanted the state to be divided after his death. The focus of the brothers' reign in the early years was the territorial consolidation of the principality. For example, they succeeded in expanding their estate in the area of Gifhorn considerably through the acquisition of the village of Fallersleben and the counties of Papenheim and Wettmarshagen. Another focus of attention was their political support of economically growing towns. For example, Lüneburg trade flourished as a result of work to make the Ilmenau navigable between Lüneburg and Uelzen as well as trade agreements between the Lüneburg princes and the dukes of Saxe-Lauenburg.

=== Selecting the successor ===
Following the death of his brother, Otto III, William increasingly turned his attention to the question of succession in the state of Lüneburg. Because his brother had lost his only son as a child and he himself had no eligible daughters, he selected his grandson, Albert of Saxe-Wittenberg, the son of his daughter Elizabeth, as his successor. In fact he had previously asked Emperor Charles IV for the eventual enfeoffment of the state to his grandson, but backed away again in the years that followed, because he feared the influence of Albert's uncles, Wenceslas and Rudolf. A further reason may be found in the terms of the Brunswick-Lüneburg investiture agreement of 1235 as well as the succession treaties agreed by William's father with the Brunswick line of the House of Welf, according to which the principality had to be passed to any male heir within the entire Welf house if there were one. In order to satisfy his desire for one of his descendants to inherit the state, he married off his younger daughter, Matilda, to Louis of Brunswick-Lüneburg. Because the latter was heir to the Brunswick region the divided estate of the ducal house would once again be united under one ruler. Unaware of this, Emperor Charles IV had meanwhile authorised the enfeoffment of Albert of Saxe-Wittenberg and his two uncles and, with that, laid the foundation stone for the Lüneburg War of Succession that began on William's death. Other problems were added by William's niece, Matilda, the daughter of his brother, Otto III. Her husband, Otto II of Waldeck, made claims against William. The imperial court awarded Otto 100,000 marks which amounted to about half the principality. In response to William's refusal to pay this, an imperial ban was imposed at first and, after a further vain attempt at mediation, the Emperor pronounced that he should be made an outlaw and tasked the Bishop of Minden to carry this out personally. Whether this actually happened is not known. Facing death, he finally handed rule of the principality to Magnus of Brunswick-Lüneburg who, after the death of his brother, Louis, had been named as heir to the principality. William died on 23 November 1369 in Lüneburg.

== Marriages and issue ==
William had a daughter by each of his four wives.
From his 1st marriage to Hedwig of Ravensberg (d. after 1387), daughter of Otto IV, Count of Ravensberg:

1. Elizabeth (d. 1384) m. Otto, Duke of Saxe-Wittenberg (d. 30 March 1350), son of Rudolf I, Duke of Saxe-Wittenberg; their son was Albert of Saxe-Wittenberg, Duke of Lüneburg

m (ca. 1354) Nicholas, Count of Holstein (b. 1321; d. 1397), son of Gerhard III, Count of Holstein-Rendsburg

From his 2nd marriage to Mary:

1. Matilda m Louis of Brunswick-Lüneburg (d. 1367), son of Magnus I, Duke of Brunswick-Lüneburg

In 1346 he married his third wife, Sophia of Anhalt-Bernburg (d. 1362), daughter of Bernhard III, Prince of Anhalt-Bernburg. In 1363 he married his fourth wife, Agnes (1353–1387), daughter of Duke Eric II of Saxe-Lauenburg.

== See also ==
- House of Welf
- Saxe-Wittenberg

William II of Brunswick-Lüneburg House of Welf Born: about 1300 Died: 23 November 1369
German nobility
Preceded by Otto II (Otto the Strict)	Duke of Brunswick-Lüneburg; Prince of Lüneburg; 1330–1369	Succeeded by Magnus II (Torquatus)
