= Frederick I of Brunswick-Wolfenbüttel =

Frederick I
- Duke of Brunswick-Lüneburg
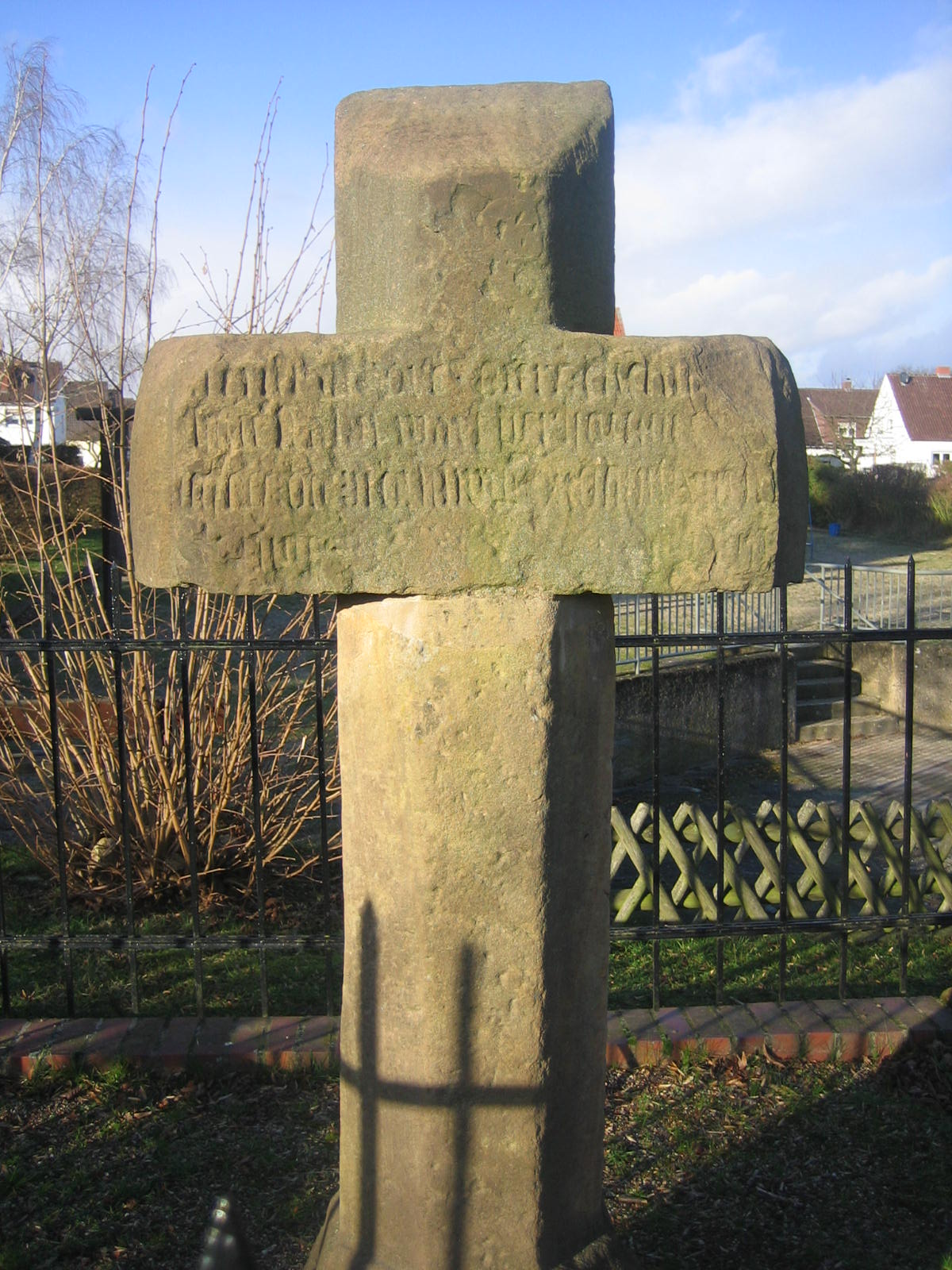

Prince of Brunswick-Wolfenbüttel
- Reign: 1373–1400
- Born: c. 1357
- Died: 5 June 1400; Kleinenglis, Waldeck
- Noble family: House of Welf
- Spouse: Anna of Saxe-Wittenberg
- Father: Magnus II, Duke of Brunswick-Lüneburg
- Mother: Catherine of Anhalt-Bernburg

Frederick (c. 1357 – 5 June 1400), a member of the House of Welf, was Duke of Brunswick-Lüneburg and ruling Prince of Brunswick-Wolfenbüttel from 1373 until his death. In May 1400, he unsuccessfully stood as a candidate for the election as German king-elect at Frankfurt, in opposition to Wenceslaus of Luxembourg, and was murdered on his way home.

== Life ==
Frederick was the eldest son of Duke Magnus II of Brunswick-Lüneburg, Prince of Wolfenbüttel, and his consort Catherine of Anhalt-Bernburg. A minor upon his father's death in 1373, he was not declared to have reached the age of majority until 1381, while Duke Otto of Brunswick-Göttingen acted as his guardian. Like his father, he was thrust into the Lüneburg Succession War, which he and his brothers attempted to end in 1373 by a treaty with the Ascanian dukes of Saxe-Wittenberg. According to this treaty, the rule over the Principality of Lüneburg would alternate between the two families. However, the dispute continued; together with his brothers, Frederick eventually won the war by conquering Lüneburg itself in 1388.

In May 1400, Frederick took part in an assembly of the Princes of the Holy Roman Empire in Frankfurt; the purpose of the meeting was to discuss the deposition of the incapable king Wenceslaus. According to some sources, Frederick's brother-in-law Duke Rudolf III of Saxe-Wittenberg proposed his election as an anti-king by a subset of the princes; nevertheless, after several princes favoured Rupert of the Palatinate and no agreement over his election could be reached, the Welf duke left the assembly. Modern historians are at odds with each other whether Frederick was ever elected or even considered a candidate, since there is no documentary evidence for this. King Wenceslaus was finally declared deposed on 20 August 1400 and Rupert was elected King of the Romans the next day.

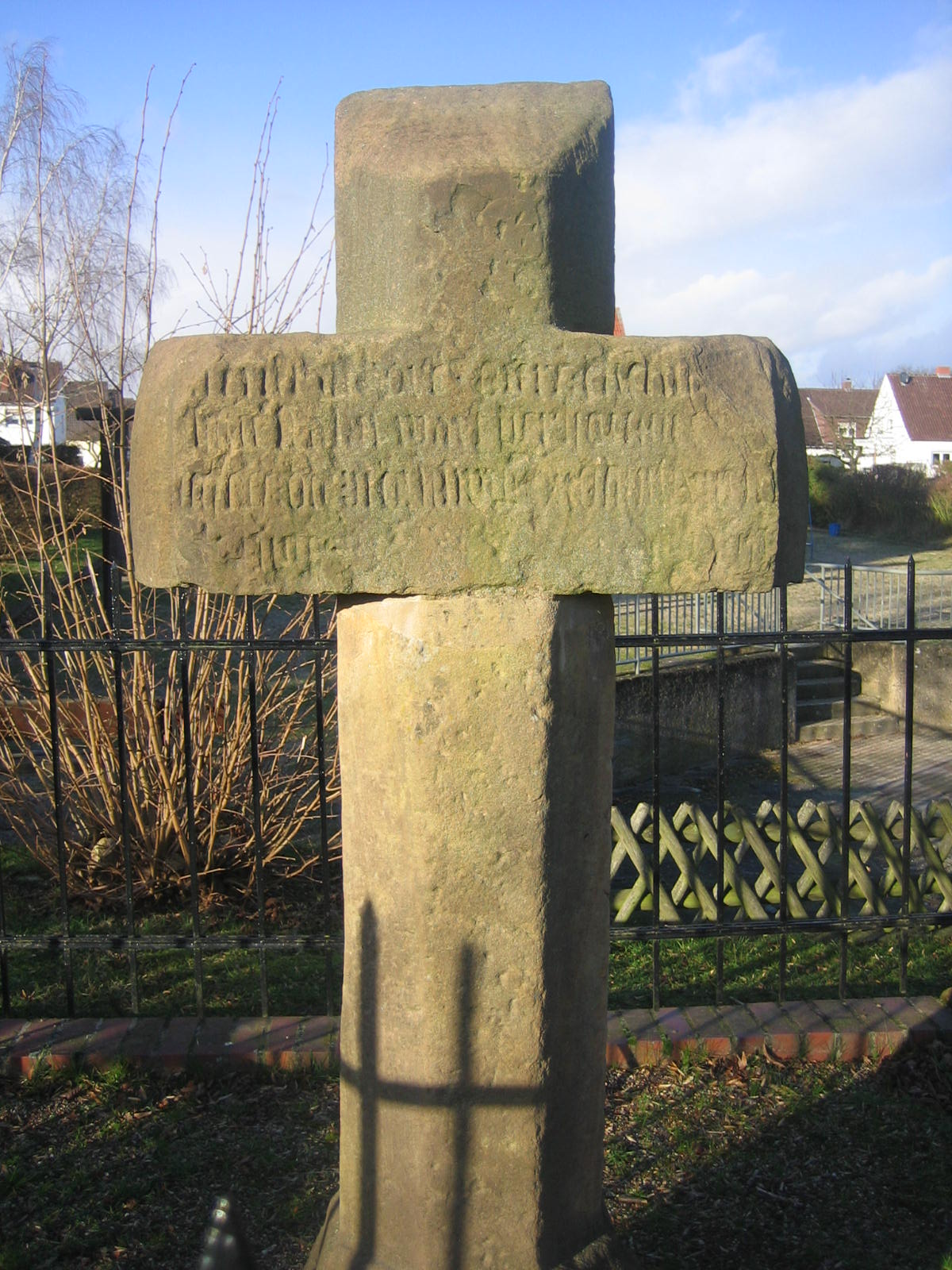
Kaiserkreuz, Kleinenglis

It is nevertheless undisputed that Frederick was murdered during his journey home by Count Henry VII of Waldeck and his henchmen, who included Friedrich von Hertingshausen and Konrad von Falkenberg. The murder may have served to get rid of a royal candidate; or the story of the royal election may have sprung up to find a motive for the murder. The assassination caused much concern at the time; a stone cross (Kaiserkreuz) was erected at its location in Kleinenglis near Fritzlar. By order of King Rupert, the murderers had to donate an altar in Saint Peter's Church, Fritzlar to atone for their crime. Frederick was entombed in Brunswick Cathedral.

== Family ==
Frederick married Anna (died 1388), a daughter of the Ascanian duke Wenceslaus I of Saxe-Wittenberg, in 1386. With her he had two daughters:

- Catherine (died ca. 1439), married Henry XXIV, Count of Schwarzburg-Sondershausen
- Anna (died 1432), married the Habsburg duke Frederick IV of Austria, called "of the Empty Pockets", Count of Tyrol.

Frederick I of Brunswick-Wolfenbüttel House of Welf Cadet branch of the House of Este Born: about 1357/58 Died: 5 June 1400
German nobility
Preceded by Magnus with the Necklace	Duke of Brunswick-Lüneburg; Prince of Brunswick-Wolfenbüttel; 1373–1400	Succeeded by Bernard I and his brother Henry the Mild
