= Lüneburg Kalkberg =

Salt dome in northern Germany

Coordinates: 53°14′58.00″N 10°23′47.00″E

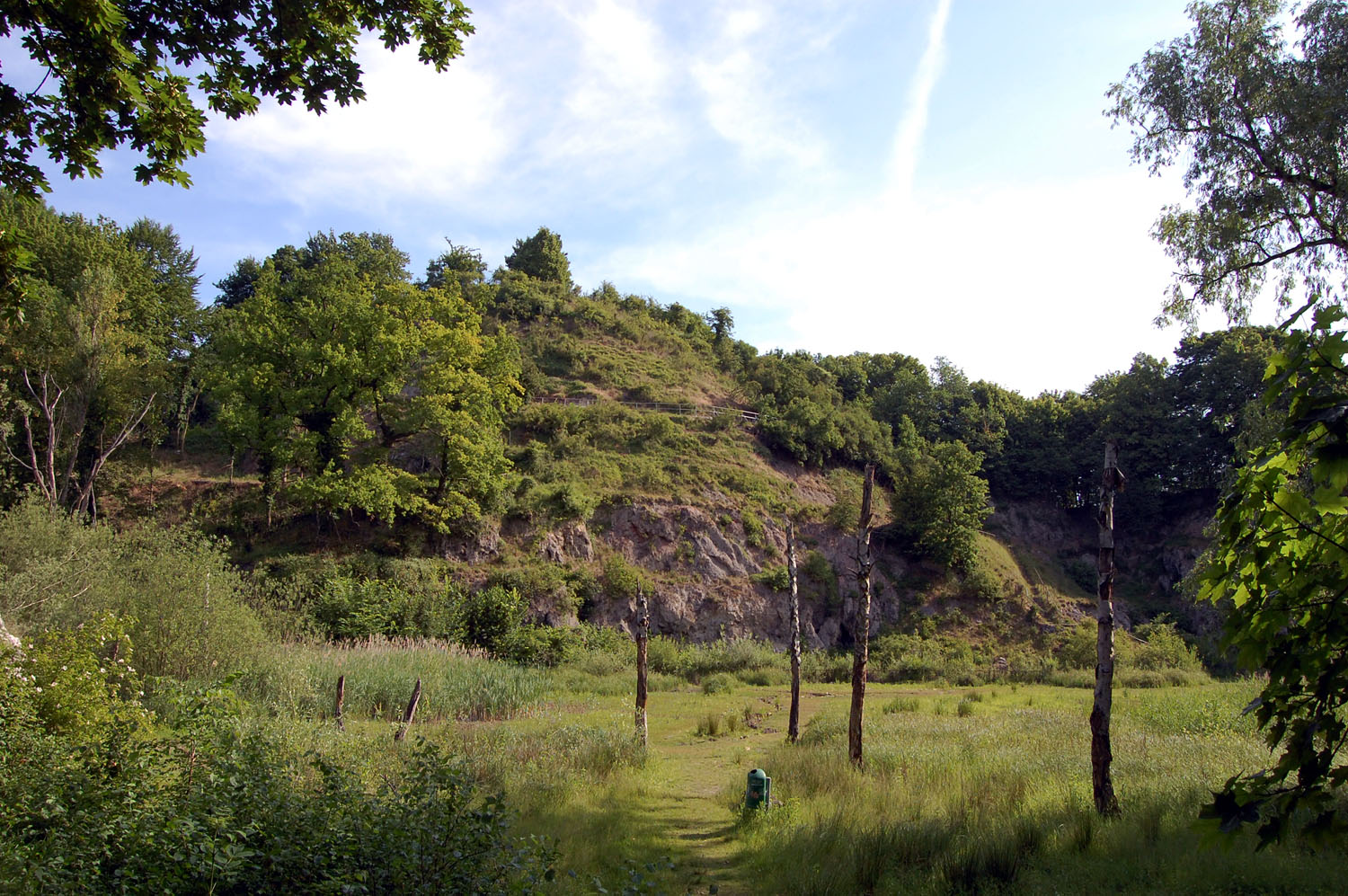
Lüneburg Kalkberg from the south

The Lüneburg Kalkberg (not to be confused with the Segeberger Kalkberg) is the cap rock of a salt dome in the western part of the German town of Lüneburg. The Kalkberg was a gypsum mine during the Middle Ages, but is today a Naturschutzgebiet (nature reserve) and a common meeting place for city residents.

== Composition and geology ==
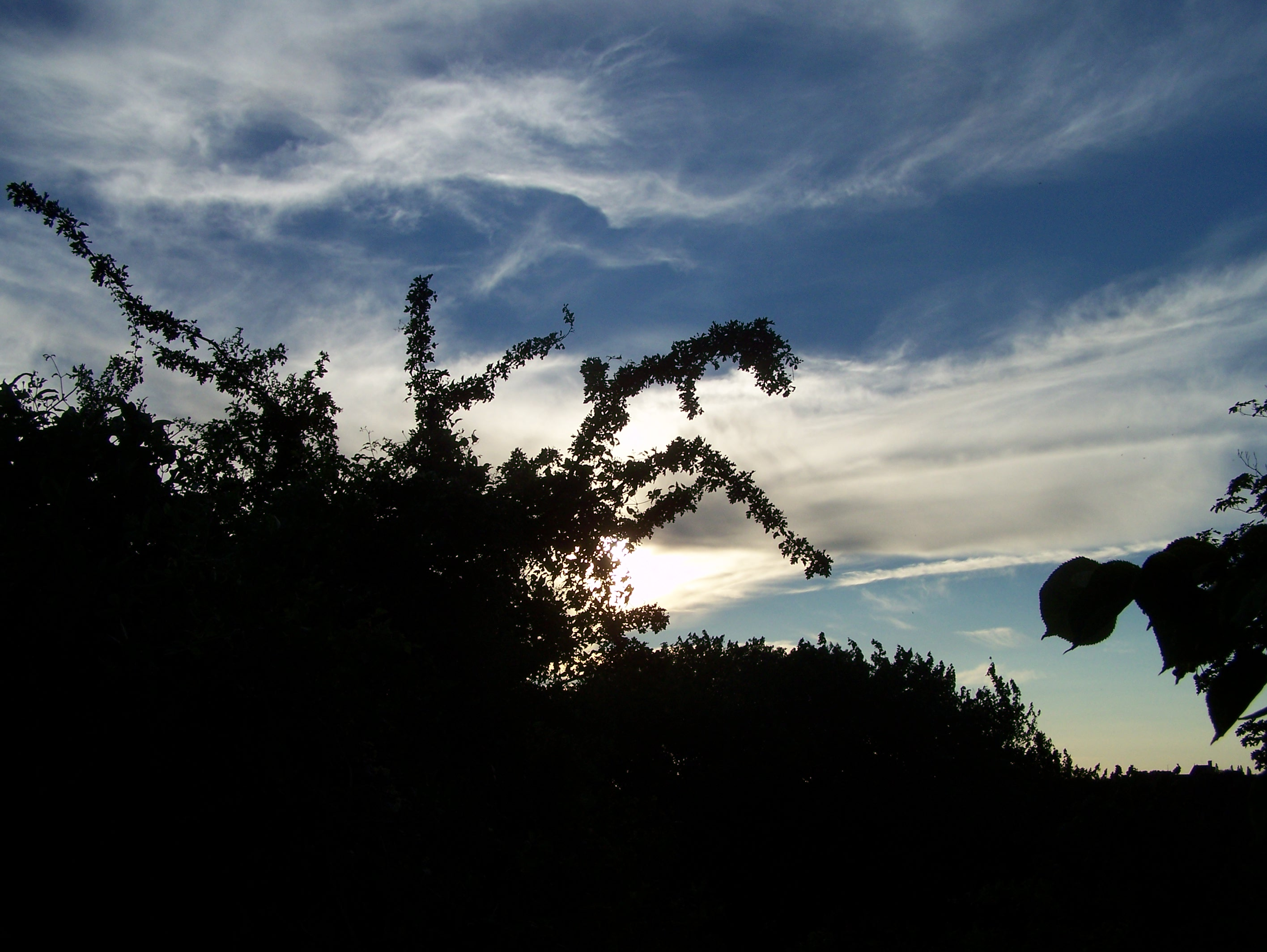
View from the Lüneburg Kalkberg at sunset

The Kalkberg is made up largely of gypsum (calcium sulphate) and comes from sediments that were deposited there around 250 million years ago by the Zechstein Sea. More recently (in geological terms), smaller disturbances have allowed the less dense Zechstein salts to flow together and force their way upwards into the younger, overlying rocks. Today these salts are near the Earth's surface. Through this process, the more geologically-recent layers of rock around the rising mass of salt were deformed, shattered, and lifted; the initially horizontally-lying layers of salt were tilted and folded as they were rose upwards. Near the surface, the resulting salt dome was leached by groundwater, so that only the less readily-soluble elements remained behind, such as carbonates and sulphates. These are the compounds that make up the Kalkberg today, and can also be seen to protrude through the surface around Lüneburg.

Today, the rock walls only have very sparse vegetation, attracting animals and plants typical of dry grassland habitats. On an area of 3.6 hectares (8.9 acres), one can find over 180 species of flowering plants, including several warmth-, light-, and chalk-loving types that otherwise grow only in south-central Europe. Several small caves are inhabited by bats.

== History ==
Until February 1371, a castle stood on top of the Kalkberg from where the Principality of Lüneburg-Brunswick was governed. During the Lüneburg War of Succession, the castle on the Kalkberg was destroyed along with the nearby monastery.

The bulk of the Kalkberg has been quarried away over the centuries in order to use the gypsum as a building material. The former quarry is still recognizable from its steep, rugged walls. As a result of the depletion of the salt deposits and the increasing anhydrite content of the gypsum, the quarry was closed in 1923. Of particular geological interest are deposits of boracite and lüneburgite. Other minerals present include anhydrite, calcite, gypsum, halite, hematite, hydroglauberite, jarosite, kalistronite, lepidocrocite, pyrite, quartz, sylvite, syngenite and thenardite.

The Kalkberg still has a height of 56.3 m above sea level. Originally it was about 80 m high. The Lüneburg surveyor Eduard Schlöbcke helped turn the Kalkberg into one of the first German nature reserves in 1932.

== Sources ==
- Eduard Schlöbcke: Der Kalkbergführer. 1000 Jahre Kalkberg und Gipsbruch in Lüneburg. Lüneburg 1928
- Gerhard Stein: Der Lüneburger Kalkberg im Wandel der Zeiten. in: Jahrbuch Naturwiss. Verein Fürstentum Lüneburg, Bd. 39, 247-258, Lüneburg 1992
- Erhard Poßin: Der Kalkberg, Bd. 4 der Lüneburger Hefte Hrsg.: Backsteinprojekt e.V., Lüneburg, 2008
