= Albert of Saxe-Wittenberg, Duke of Lüneburg =

Albert of Saxe-Wittenberg
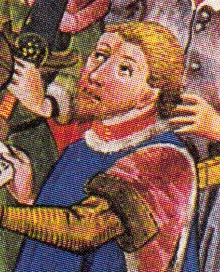
- Albert of Saxe-Wittenberg, miniature of 1442
- Born: before 1350
- Died: 28 June 1385; Wittenberg
- Noble family: House of Ascania
- Spouse: Catherine of Anhalt-Bernburg
- Father: Otto of Saxe-Wittenberg
- Mother: Elisabeth of Brünswick-Lüneburg

Albert of Saxe-Wittenberg (German: Albrecht von Sachsen-Wittenberg; died 28 June 1385 in Wittenberg) was born as the son of Otto (d. 30 March 1350), a younger son of the prince-elector Rudolf I of Saxe-Wittenberg, and his (Otto's) wife Elisabeth, daughter of Duke William II of Brunswick-Lüneburg. In 1370 he succeeded his (maternal) grandfather as the Duke or Prince of Lüneburg.

William II of Brunswick-Lüneburg named his grandson Albert as his heir in Lüneburg because neither he or his brother had male heirs. In fact William II had previously asked Emperor Charles IV for the eventual enfeoffment of the state to his grandson, but backed away again in the years that followed, because he feared the influence of Albert's uncles, Wenceslas I and Rudolf II. A further reason may be found in the terms of the Brunswick-Lüneburg investiture agreement of 1235 as well as the succession treaties agreed by William's father Otto the Strict with Brunswick-Lüneburg's Wolfenbüttel line of the House of Welf, according to which the principality had to be passed to any male heir within the entire Welf house if there were one.

After the death of William II and the succession of the Wolfenbüttel Magnus II, the Lüneburg War of Succession broke out between Saxe-Wittenberg and Brunswick-Wolfenbüttel. Albert was backed by his uncle the Prince-Elector Wenceslas of Saxony (Saxe-Wittenberg). On 25 July 1373, Duke Magnus was killed in a battle near Leveste on the Deister (part of modern-day Gehrden). After this an arrangement was agreed between Prince-Elector Wenceslas and Albert, on the one hand and the widow of Magnus II and her sons on the other. It was agreed that the land would belong, undivided, to the two Ascanians from Saxe-Wittenberg and, after their deaths, would be transferred to the sons of the fallen duke, Magnus II. And that it should continue to alternate after the deaths of the Welfs, i.e. the succession would pass to the Ascanians again. In order that this plan could also be reinforced by family ties, in 1374 Albert of Saxe-Lüneburg married the widow of Magnus II, Catharina and chose Celle as his home, which he made a residence in 1378. The two still underage sons of Magnus also married into the House of Ascania in 1386. He would rule the Principality of Lüneburg jointly with his uncle Wenceslas until his death on 28 June 1385.

== Family ==
Albert married Catherina, daughter of Bernhard III, Prince of Anhalt-Bernburg, widow of Magnus II, Duke of Brunswick-Lüneburg. The marriage was on 10 November 1373 in Hanover and 11 May 1374 in Celle. They had one daughter:

- Helene of Saxe-Wittenberg (1385–?)

== Ancestry ==
Ancestors of Albert of Saxe-Wittenberg, Duke of Lüneburg

16. Albert I, Duke of Saxony
8. Albert II, Duke of Saxony
17. Helene of Brunswick-Lüneburg
4. Rudolf I, Duke of Saxe-Wittenberg
18. Rudolf I of Germany
9. Agnes of Habsburg
19. Gertrude of Hohenberg
2. Otto of Saxe-Wittenberg
20. Otto III, Margrave of Brandenburg
10. Otto V, Margrave of Brandenburg-Salzwedel
21. Beatrice of Bohemia
5. Jutta of Brandenburg
22. Herman I, Count of Henneberg
11. Jutta of Henneberg
23. Margaret of Holland
1. Albert of Saxe-Wittenberg, Duke of Lüneburg
24. John I, Duke of Brunswick-Lüneburg
12. Otto II, Duke of Brunswick-Lüneburg
25. Liutgard of Holstein
6. William II, Duke of Brunswick-Lüneburg
26. Louis II, Duke of Bavaria
13. Matilda of Bavaria
27. Matilda of Habsburg
3. Elisabeth of Brunswick-Lüneburg
28. Otto III of Ravensberg
14. Otto IV, Count of Ravensberg
29. Hedwig of Lippe
7. Hedwig of Ravensberg
30. Henry of Berg, Lord of Windeck
15. Margaret of Berg-Windeck
31. Agnes of the Marck

== Sources ==
- Lorenz Friedrich Beck: Herrschaft und Territorium der Herzöge von Sachsen-Wittenberg (1212-1422). Potsdam 2000. ISBN 3-932981-63-4
- Heinrich Kühne: Die Ascanier. Drei Kastanien Verlag 1999, ISBN 3-933028-14-0
- Georg Hirschfeld: Geschichte der Sächsisch-Askanischen Kurfürsten. Julius Sittenfeld, Berlin 1884
- Otto von Heinemann (1875). "Albrecht, Herzog von Sachsen" . Allgemeine Deutsche Biographie (in German). Vol. 1. Leipzig: Duncker & Humblot. p. 204.

Albert, Duke of Saxe-Wittenberg House of Ascania Born: before 1350 Died: 28 June 1385
German nobility
Preceded by Magnus II	Prince of Luneburg; 1370–1385 with his uncle Wenceslas (1370–1388)	Succeeded by Wenceslas of Saxe-Wittenberg
