= Anna of Saxe-Wittenberg =

- Died: 18 April 1426
- Spouse: Frederick I, Duke of Brunswick-Lüneburg; Balthasar, Landgrave of Thuringia
- House: House of Ascania
- Father: Wenceslas I, Duke of Saxe-Wittenberg
- Mother: Cecilia of Carrara

Anna of Saxe-Wittenberg (died: 18 April 1426) was a member of the House of Ascania and the wife of Duke Frederick I of Brunswick-Lüneburg, a German anti-king.

Anna of Saxe-Wittenberg was the daughter of Duke Wenceslas I of Saxe-Wittenberg, Duke of Lüneburg and Elector of Saxony and his wife Cecilia of Carrara.

In 1386 she married Duke Frederick I of Brunswick-Lüneburg. They had two daughters. In 1400 Frederick was elected King of the Germans. This election, however, was not recognized by three of the electors. Frederick was murdered on the way home, a month after the election.

Anna's second marriage was with Landgrave Balthasar of Thuringia, Margrave of Meissen. This marriage remained childless.

== Issue ==
From her first marriage to Frederick I, Duke of Brunswick-Lüneburg she had two daughters:

1. Catherine (died before 1439), married Henry XXIV, Count of Schwarzburg-Sondershausen
2. Anna (1390–1432), married in 1410 Duke Frederick IV, Duke of Austria, "of the Empty Pockets" of Austria, a Tyrollean Count

== Ancestors ==
Ancestors of Anna of Saxe-Wittenberg

16. Albert I, Duke of Saxony
8. Albert II, Duke of Saxony
17. Helen of Brunswick-Lünenburg
4. Rudolf I, Duke of Saxe-Wittenberg
18. Rudolph I of Germany
9. Agnes of Habsburg
19. Gertrude of Hohenberg
2. Wenceslas I, Duke of Saxe-Wittenberg
20. Günther I, Count of Lindow
10. Ulrich I, Count of Lindow-Ruppin
21. Euphemia of Rügen
5. Agnes of Lindow-Ruppin
22. Meinher, Count of Schladen
11. Adelaide of Schladen
23. Adelaide of Werberg
1. Anna of Saxe-Wittenberg
24. Niccolo da Carrara
12. Jacopo II da Carrara
25. Elena Torre
6. Francesco I da Carrara
26. Guido II Novello da Polenta, signore di Ravenna
13. Costanza da Polenta dei Signori di Ravenna
27. Caterina Malabocca
3. Cecilia of Carrara
28. Dusio Buzzacarini
14. Pataro Buzzacarini
7. Fina Buzzacarini
15. Francesca Gonzaga
