= Magnus II of Brunswick-Lüneburg =

German noble (c. 1324 – 1373)

Magnus II
- Duke of Brunswick-Lüneburg
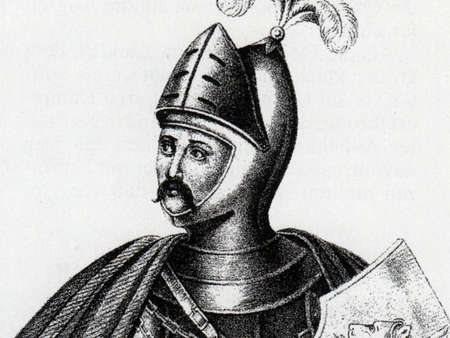
- Born: 1328
- Died: 25 July 1373 (aged 44–45)
- Noble family: House of Guelph
- Spouse: Catherine of Anhalt-Bernburg
- Issue: Catherine Elizabeth, Duchess of Schleswig; Frederick I, Duke of Brunswick-Lüneburg; Bernard I, Duke of Brunswick-Lüneburg; Otto; Henry, Duke of Brunswick-Lüneburg; Agnes I Helen; Elizabeth; Agnes, Duchess of Pomerania
- Father: Magnus I, Duke of Brunswick-Lüneburg
- Mother: Sophie of Brandenburg-Stendal

Magnus (c. 1324 – 25 July 1373), called Magnus with the Necklace (Latin: Magnus Torquatus) or Magnus II, was Duke of Brunswick-Lüneburg, ruling the Brunswick-Lüneburg principalities of Wolfenbüttel (colloquially also called Brunswick) and, temporarily, Lüneburg.

== Biography ==
Magnus was the son of Magnus the Pious, Duke of Brunswick-Lüneburg (Wolfenbüttel). In 1362 Magnus and his brother Louis I, Duke of Brunswick-Lüneburg helped their brother Prince-Archbishop Albert II of Bremen to assert himself against the incumbent diocesan administrator Morris of Oldenburg, who claimed the see for himself. Magnus, Louis and the latter's father-in-law William II, Duke of Brunswick-Lüneburg (Celle), and their troops beleaguered Morris in the prince-archiepiscopal castle in Vörde and forced him to sign his resignation.

After the death of his brother Louis in 1367, Magnus became the designated heir of both ducal principalities, Wolfenbüttel and Celle (colloquially also Lüneburg). When both his father and William II, who ruled over Celle, died in 1369, Magnus gained both ducal principalities. But already in 1370, he lost Celle to the Ascanian dukes of Saxe-Wittenberg (Albert and his uncle Wenceslas, Elector of Saxe-Wittemberg), who had been given the principality by Charles IV, Holy Roman Emperor, who had also banned Magnus. Several cities, including Lüneburg (Lunenburg), Uelzen, and Hanover switched allegiance to the Ascanians; Magnus managed to keep the City of Braunschweig (Brunswick) among his allies only with difficulties. The Lüneburg War of Succession continued for several years after Magnus died in the Battle of Leveste (a part of today's Gehrden), near the Deister, on 25 July 1373.

== Family ==
On 6 October 1356 Magnus married Catherine, daughter of Bernhard III, Prince of Anhalt-Bernburg. After Magnus' death, she remarried his enemy, Albert, Duke of Saxe-Wittenberg. Catherine and Magnus had the following children:

- Catherine Elizabeth married Gerhard II/VI, Duke of Schleswig/Count of Holstein-Rendsburg (ca. 1367 – 4 August 1404)
- Frederick I, Duke of Brunswick-Lüneburg (1357–1400), married Anna of Saxe-Wittenberg (died 1440)
- Bernard I, Duke of Brunswick-Lüneburg (died 1434), married Margaret of Saxony (before 1370 – 1418)
- Otto, Archbishop of Bremen (ca. 1364–1406)
- Henry the Mild, Duke of Brunswick-Lüneburg (died 1416)
- Agnes I (died 1410), married Albert I, Duke of Brunswick-Grubenhagen (1339–1383)
- Helen, married Eric I, Count of Hoya
- Elizabeth (died 1420), married Maurice IV, Count of Oldenburg (1380–1420)
- Agnes II (before 1356 – ca. 1416), married first Busso IV, Count of Mansfeld, then Bogislaw VI, Duke of Pomerania, and finally King Albert of Sweden
- Sophie (1358–by 28 May 1416), married Duke Eric IV of Saxe-Lauenburg on 8 April 1373.
- Maud (1370–??), married Otto III, Count of Hoya (died 1428)

Magnus II of Brunswick-Lüneburg House of Welf Born: 1328 Died: 25 July 1373
German nobility
Preceded by William II	Duke of Brunswick-Lüneburg; Prince of Lüneburg; 1369–1373	Succeeded by Albert of Saxe-Wittenberg and Wenceslas of Saxe-Wittenberg
Preceded by Magnus the Pious	Duke of Brunswick-Lüneburg; Prince of Brunswick-Wolfenbüttel; 1369–1373	Succeeded by Frederick I
