= Principality of Lüneburg =

Division of the Holy Roman Empire

Principality of Lüneburg (also: Celle, Brunswick-Celle or Brunswick and Luneburg) Fürstentum Lüneburg (Braunschweig und Lüneburg)
- 1269–1705
- Coat of arms
- Status: Principality
- Capital: Lüneburg, then Celle
- Common languages: Low Saxon, German
- Religion: Roman Catholic until 1527, then Lutheran
- Duke of Brunswick and Lüneburg, Prince of Lüneburg (-Celle)
  - 1269–1277: John I
  - 1369–1373: Magnus II Torquatus
  - 1520–1546: Ernest I the Confessor
  - 1665–1705: George William
- Historical era: Middle Ages; Early modern period
  - Henry the Lion defeated; break-up of Duchy of Saxony: 1180/1181
  - Partition of the Duchy of Brunswick and Lüneburg among the heirs (Salic law): 1269
  - Inherited by George Louis, Prince of Calenberg: 28 August 1705
Preceded by	Succeeded by
Brunswick-Lüneburg	Electorate of Hanover

The Principality of Lüneburg (later also referred to as Celle) was a territorial division of the Duchy of Brunswick-Lüneburg within the Holy Roman Empire, immediately subordinate to the emperor. It existed from 1269 until 1705 and its territory lay within the modern-day state of Lower Saxony in Germany. The principality was named after its first capital, Lüneburg (also called Lunenburg in English), which was ruled jointly by all Brunswick-Lüneburg lines until 1637. From 1378, the seat of the principality was in Celle. It lost its independence in 1705 when it was annexed by the Electorate of Brunswick-Lüneburg, but retained its vote in the Reichstag as Brunswick-Celle.

== Territory ==
When the Principality of Lüneburg emerged as a result of the division of Brunswick-Lüneburg in 1269, the domain of the Lüneburg princes consisted of a large number of territorial rights in the region of Lüneburg. However, it could not be described as a unified state, because many rights were owned by other vassals of the imperial crown. Not until the acquisition of numerous counties and rights in the 13th and 14th centuries did the rulers of Lüneburg succeed in building a unified state. Following the division of the principalities of Brunswick-Wolfenbüttel and Lüneburg between Bernard and Henry in 1409, the territorial development of the state was largely complete. At that time, the Principality of Lüneburg included the larger part of the Lüneburg Heath and the Wendland, and measured about 11,000 square kilometres (4,200 sq mi).

== History ==
=== Emergence ===
The Principality of Lüneburg was created by the division of the Duchy of Brunswick-Lüneburg, a state that had been formed in 1235 from the allodial lands of the Welfs in Saxony and given as an imperial fief to Otto the Child, a nephew of Henry the Lion. The name of the dukedom was drawn from the two largest towns in the territory, Lüneburg and Brunswick. Following the death of Otto, his two sons split the duchy in 1267 or 1269, into subordinate principalities; Brunswick going to Albert and Lüneburg to John. Together, the two principalities continued to form the Duchy of Brunswick-Lüneburg which remained undivided according to imperial law, something that is clear from the fact that inter alia all the princes of the various lines carried the title of Duke of Brunswick-Lüneburg. In addition, the two capitals, Lüneburg and Brunswick, remained in the common ownership of the House of Welf until 1512 and 1671 respectively.

=== Old House of Lüneburg ===
When John died in 1277, the regency was held by his brother, Albert, on behalf of John's underage son, Otto the Strict, before Otto assumed power himself in 1282. Otto asserted his rule through the prosecution of numerous feuds against the lesser nobility, which enabled him to achieve consolidate his ducal authority within the state. He also continued the "systematic acquisition policy" (planmässige Erwerbspolitik) in the Lüneburg principality that had operated since the time of Otto the Child, "rounding off the Lüneburg allodial estate" (Arrondierung des Lüneburger Allodialbesitzes) through the purchase of numerous lands and rights, including those of Bleckede and Hitzacker, the County of Dannenberg and the County of Wölpe.

Duke Otto was followed by his sons, Otto III of Lüneburg and William of Lüneburg. The instruction issued by their father in 1318 whereby the principality would be divided after his death between Otto III and his brother, William II, was ignored by the brothers and in 1330 they assumed joint control of an undivided state. The focus of their rule in the early years was a further territorial consolidation of the principality. For example, they were able to considerably increase their estate in the region of Gifhorn through the purchase of the village of Fallersleben, the County of Papenteich and Wettmarshagen. Another top priority was their political support for the towns, which were striving to develop themselves economically. For instance, the merchants of Lüneburg benefited considerably from work to make the River Ilmenau navigable between Lüneburg and Uelzen and from trade agreements between the Lüneburg princes and the dukes of Saxe-Lauenburg. The two brothers reigned jointly until the death of Otto III in 1352, leaving William in sole charge until his own death in 1369.

=== Lüneburg War of Succession ===
When William II of Lüneburg died in 1369 without a son, the first house of Lüneburg became extinct. According to Welf house rules and the desire of William, Duke Magnus II Torquatus of Brunswick would have been the rightful heir. Emperor Charles IV, however, considered it an imperial fiefdom, however, and granted the principality to Albert of Saxe-Wittenberg and his uncle Wenceslas, thus precipitating the Lüneburg War of Succession.

The town of Lüneburg supported the Wittenbergs and took the opportunity to escape from the immediate influence of the duke, destroying the ducal castle on the Kalkberg on 1 February 1371 and forcing him to relocate his residence to Celle. An attempt on 21 October 1371, St. Ursula's Day, to overthrow Lüneburg militarily and to secure the old ducal rights, failed. In the military conflict that followed, neither the Brunswicks nor the Wittenbergs were able to enforce their claims, and only the peace of Hanover in 1373, ended the war, at least for a time. According to the agreement reached there, the Welfs and the Wittenbergs were to rule alternately.

Magnus Torquatus had already died in 1373, so the treaty between the two contending houses was further reinforced by the marriage of his two eldest sons, Frederick and Bernard I, to the two daughters of Wenceslas and by the marriage of Magnus's widow to Albert of Saxe-Wittenberg. The younger brother of Frederick and Bernard, Henry the Mild refused, however, to accept the agreement and continued to prosecute the war. It was not until after the Battle of Winsen in 1388, when Wenceslas lost his life, that the Wittenbergs gave up their claims and the principality was finally secured by the Welfs.

=== Lüneburg Sate and Lüneburg Sate War ===
The Lüneburg War of Succession resulted in a large plenitude of power going to the estates within the principality . To secure the support of towns and the lower nobility, both the Welfs and the Ascanians were forced to give the estates wide privileges, and enfeoff them with numerous rights and castles. The Celle dukes, Bernard and Henry had emerged victorious from the conflict to be sure, but faced huge financial problems as a result. So when they appeared before the town of Lüneburg with a fresh request for funds in September 1392, they had to agree to a significant treaty, the so-called Lüneburg Sate, in which the estates were granted numerous privileges and the dukes had to submit to the authority of a council of the landowners of the estates, in return for a loan of 50,000 marks.

The years that followed were characterised by renewed tensions between the rulers and the landowners and attempts by the dukes to weaken the standing of the Lüneburg Sate. In 1396 it was finally rejected. After he had secured the assistance Sweden and Mecklenburg by concluding a treaty of friendship and security, Duke Henry, soon to be followed by his brother, Bernard, took the town of Uelzen as his residence, which forced the town to announce its withdrawal from the Sate and to pay homage to the dukes of Lüneburg. In the course of the clashes that now arose between the dukes and the town of Lüneburg, numerous battles were fought across the entire country. Through the support of the Hanseatic towns of Hamburg and Lübeck, Lüneburg achieved military superiority, so that the Celle dukes sued for peace with their opponents. In October 1397 there was a contractual agreement between the warring parties, but the restitution of the Lüneburg Sate that had been sought by the town of Lüneburg was not forthcoming.

=== Middle House of Lüneburg ===
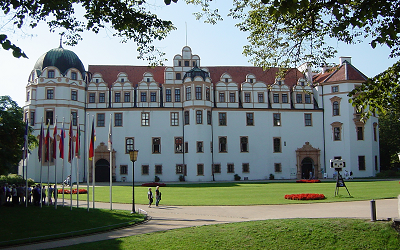
The ducal residence in Celle

The joint reign of brothers, Bernard and Henry, from 1388 to 1409 was followed by another division of the principality in which Bernard was given Brunswick and Henry received Lüneburg. After Duke Henry's death in 1416, he was followed by his two sons, William and Henry. Their rule was characterized primarily by the financial constraints under which the country continued to suffer in the wake of the Lüneburg War of Succession.

In 1428 there was a further division of the Welf estate between the 2 brothers and their uncle, Bernard, Prince of Brunswick. The brothers William and Henry received the land between the Deister and the Leine, which was later to become the Principality of Brunswick-Wolfenbüttel, having acquired the Principality of Calenberg; and their uncle, Bernard, received the Principality of Lüneburg, thus becoming the progenitor of the Middle House of Lüneburg.

After Duke Bernard died in 1434, his eldest son, Otto became the ruling prince. In 1446 he was followed by his brother, Frederick the Pious, who abdicated, however, in 1457 in favour of his sons, Bernard and Otto, in order to enter the Franciscan abbey at Celle. After both brothers had died in 1464 and 1471 respectively, Frederick the Pious left the abbey again in order to hold the reins of power for his 3-year old nephew, Henry the Middle, the son of Otto of Lüneburg and Anna of Nassau.

When Frederick died in 1478, Anna of Nassau ruled the principality for her son until he was old enough to take power in Celle in 1486; she then retired to her dower at Lüchow Castle. Because of his role in the Hildesheim Diocesan Feud and the associated political opposition to Emperor Charles V, Henry was forced to abdicate in 1520 in favour of his sons Otto and Ernest the Confessor. Otto relinquished his princedom in 1527 and was compensated with the Amt of Harburg. In 1539, their youngest brother, Francis, who had also shared the reins of power since 1536, also abdicated and was given the Amt of Gifhorn, leaving Ernest the Confessor to rule alone.

=== Ernest the Confessor and the Reformation ===
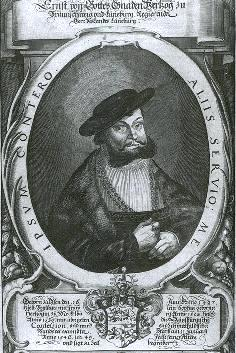
Herzog Ernest the Confessor on a copperplate by P. Troscheli from the 17th century

One priority for Duke Ernest "the Confessor" was to pay off the principality's massive debts. When he came to power, all the offices (Ämter) were pledged, with the exception of the Schlossvogtei. Consequently his efforts were aimed primarily at the redeeming them again (Wiedereinlösung). The necessary tax increases led to serious clashes with the estates. However, Ernest succeeded in asserting himself, and in enforced reduction of the state debt. His second major work was the introduction of the Protestant Reformation. Ernest had himself studied at Wittenberg and had been in contact with Luther's teachers there. Soon after succeeding, he began to reform the church of Lüneburg to Lutheranism. At the 1527 Landtag recess, even those nobles who had been hostile declared their support for the new faith. In 1530, Ernest signed the Augsburg Confession, and brought back with him the Augsburg reformer Urbanus Rhegius, who was largely responsible for the implementation of the Reformation in Lüneburg over the succeeding decades.

When Duke Ernest died, his sons were still minors, and their two uncles, Otto and Francis, refused the regency. As a result, the Emperor decreed that the Archbishop of Cologne and the Count of Schaumburg were to govern on their behalf. The eldest son, Francis Otto assumed power in 1555, but abdicated as early as 1559 in favour of his brothers, Henry and William.

Following Henry's resignation ten years later, William officially reigned alone until his death in 1592, but due to serious mental problems, he only played a very limited part in political life and spent his last years in mental derangement. His rule, like his father's, was dominated by an enforced policy of debt relief. But reconciliation with the town of Lüneburg in 1562 and the associated acquisition of part of the principality's debt and imperial taxes by the town played a major role in easing the parlous financial situation. Further important reforms included the Lutheran Church Order, adopted in 1564, which practically completed the Reformation in Lüneburg, as well as the aulic court and administrative ordinances (the Hofgerichtsordnung and Polizeiordnung).

William left 15 children, including seven sons: Ernest, Christian, Augustus, Frederick, Magnus, George, and John. In 1592, all the brothers agreed to entrust the government of the whole realm (with limitation) to Ernest, initially for eight years, and in 1600 for a further ten. Then in 1610, they agreed that the Principality of Lüneburg and all its dependencies should be his and his descendants as an indivisible whole. However, after Ernest's death in 1611, and given the difficulty of ever new divisions, the remaining brothers made another agreement in 1612. Under this new arrangement, each of the brothers would exercise power in succession, but only one of them would marry a woman of appropriate rank (so only their children could inherit). This would continue the ducal lineage and maintain the unity of the Principality. They drew lots: the lot fell to the second youngest brother, George, who married Anne Eleonore of Hesse-Darmstadt in 1617.

=== New House of Lüneburg ===
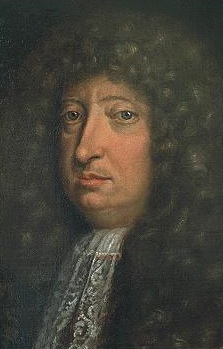
The heath duke George William in a 1655 oil painting

After the death of George's brother Frederick of Lüneburg, George's eldest son Christian Louis inherited Lüneburg in 1648 and became the founder of the new line of Lüneburg. In 1665, Christian Louis died, and was temporarily succeeded by George's third son John, who usurped the throne over George's second son George William, who then held the Principality of Calenberg. George William soon displaced John in Lüneburg, but had to cede Calenberg to John, and also the Principality of Grubenhagen, which had been acquired by the House of Lüneburg in 1617.

George William, often called the "heath duke" (Heideherzog), led the princely court during its final flourish. During his reign the baroque theatre was built that is still open today, the French Garden was laid out and palace façade designed in its current baroque form. After his death in 1705, George of Hanover, who was both the benefactor of Georges William's 1658 renunciation in favour of his younger brother Ernest Augustus and the husband of George William's morganatic daughter Sophie Dorothea, inherited the state of Lüneburg, which was merged into the Electorate of Brunswick-Lüneburg and finally lost its independence.

== Welf side lines ==
In the 16th century several Welf secondary lines emerged which received their own territories:

=== Harburg ===
Following his marriage to lady-in-waiting Metta von Campen in 1527, Duke Otto relinquished his participation in the government of the principality, and was compensated with the Amt of Harburg as his own territorial lordship. Harburg remained an integral part of the principality; the ducal chancery in Celle continued to be responsible for border and territorial issues, the noble knights the Amt of Harburg continued to participate in the Lüneburg estates assembly and enfeoffed by the duke in Celle. When Otto died in 1549, the Amt of Harburg should have reverted to the dukes of Celle, but Otto's son, Otto the Second, succeeded in 1560 in having a new regulation added to the severance agreement of 1527. Harburg was defined as an hereditary possession and its territory increased by the district of Moisburg. When the Harburg line became extinct in 1642, the territory reverted to the lordship of the ducal house in Celle.

=== Gifhorn ===
Personal disagreements between the brothers Ernest and Francis in 1539 led to the emergence of a domain at Gifhorn, the so-called Duchy of Gifhorn. In return for renouncing his participation in the government of the principality, Francis received Gifhorn Castle as compensation along with the Ämter of Fallersleben, Gifhorn and Isenhagen. Even though Francis tried to force through his full sovereignty over his domain, important sovereign rights were retained by the ducal house in Celle. For example, Celle was still responsible for foreign policy issues and the Gifhorn nobility remained part of the Lüneburg estates. When Duke Francis died childless in 1549, the territory of Gifhorn went back to Celle.

=== Dannenberg ===
When Duke Henry went against a gentleman's agreement with his brother William and married Ursula of Saxe-Lauenburg in 1569, he had forsake sharing the government of the principality and was compensated instead with the Amt of Dannenberg and the Klosteramt of Scharnebeck. The barony of Danneberg remained part of the Principality of Lüneburg, however, and important sovereign rights, such as foreign policy or tax policy, remained with the government in Celle. In 1592, after the death of Duke William, the territory was enlarged with the Ämter of Hitzacker, Lüchow and Warpke, but Henry's demands for a transfer of sovereignty were not met. After the Principality of Grubenhagen had returned to Celle in 1617, the Dannenberg line received the Amt of Wustrow as compensation. In 1671 the barony of Dannenberg went back to the Welf line in Celle.

== Politics and administration ==
=== Central administration ===
As well as the ducal counsellors, who at that time were noble (edelfrei) vassals, a number of medieval court offices, who had emerged in the 12th century, can still be found in the 13th. These are the offices of seneschal (Truchseß), butler (Schenk), chamberlain (Kämmerer) and marshal (Marshall), which were held by certain hereditary noble families. For example, the von Grote family provided the seneschal and the von Medings the marshal. The butler and the chamberlain were initially supplied by the vom Berge family and, when they died out, the von dem Knesebecks became the chamberlains and the von Behrs were the butlers. These offices are mentioned up to the 14th century, but had largely lost their political influence, by the turn of that century. At that time a princely council evolved, formed mainly of members of the Lüneburg ministeriales. The composition of these nobles at that time was not consistent, but depended on the residence of the duke. Only with the emergence of Celle as the ducal seat in the middle of the 15th century did it take a clear shape, although individual advisors were members of the duke's inner circle for a long time.

At the head of the ducal chancery, the Kanzlei, the highest authority mentioned in the documents was the chief secretary or Kanzleivorsteher. Beneath him were the scribes, most of whom came from the Lüneburg clergy.

In the 16th century, in addition to noble councillors, who by this time were known as Landräte, there were often learned, foreign advisors. The chancery was headed by the chancellor who was also a scholar. From that time the chancery acted, not simply as an office, but was also the advisory chamber of the councillors (Räte) and the seat of the chancery court (Kanzleigericht).

After 1536 financial matters were the responsibility of the treasury (Rentenkammer), headed by the treasurer (Rentmeister).

After the death of Ernest the Confessor in 1546 a regency was formed for his minor sons. The government was led by a so-called governor (Statthalter), who oversaw the administration of the court and royal office. The Celle advocate (Vogt), the chancellor and the vice-chancellor also belonged to the government. This institution remained as the highest state authority even after Ernest's sons took power.

In 1593, a new office of Kammerrat was created, following the adoption of a new "Chancery and Government Ordinance", to which only the governor, the Celle advocate and the chancellor reported. The Kammerrat was responsible for key policy decisions, particularly in financial matters and the area of foreign policy, while the duties of the chancery were restricted merely to administration.

In 1618 several council chambers (Ratsstuben) were set up in accordance with a new ordinance, the Regimentsordnung. These chambers were each responsible only for a specific area: the consistory (Konsistorium) for questions on church matters, the Kriegsrat for military affairs and the Haushaltsrat for financial management. The old office Kammerrat was replaced by a privy councillor (Geheime Rat) who was primarily responsible for matters of foreign policy.

=== Local administration ===
In the 13th and 14th centuries, regional magistracies (Gogerichte) handled the local administration of the principality. In addition to the exercising juridical authority they were responsible inter alia, for "the muster of tied villeins, the organization of defence and for taking charge of the militia" (Aufgebot der folgepflichtigen Hintersassen, Verteidigungsorganisation bis hin zur Sorge für die Landwehren).

Beginning in the 13th century, advocacies (Vogteien) emerged in the Principality of Lüneburg as providers of local administration, sometimes in parallel with the existing magistracies and sometimes based on them. Little information is available about exactly how these advocacies were established. From the 16th century the term Amt was used, and districts subordinate to the Ämter were then known as Vogteien. The process for establishing the offices (Ämter) was basically completed in the 16th century with the emergence of the ecclesiastical Klosterämter after the Reformation.

In charge of the Amt was a bailiff-cum-magistrate (Amtmann), who was appointed by the duke. Belonging to the Amt was the so-called Amtshof, which was originally run by the Amtsmann, but from the 17th century was usually leased. The Ämter reported to the ducal treasury, the Rentkammer, in Celle.

The Ämter exercised the duke's territorial rights and were involved in the raising of sovereign taxes. Importantly, they were also the first level of jurisdiction for all civil disputes and lesser criminal cases. In addition, they were the administrative centre for the ducal estate, i.e. they levied the manorial obligations due to the Duke.

Special cases were brought before the so-called "closed aristocratic courts" (geschlossenen adeligen Gerichte) in Gartow and Wathlingen. Here the local families, the von Bernstorffs and the von Lüneburgs, were not only responsible for lower and higher courts, but also ran the administration of the principality on behalf of the duke. The towns of Celle, Harburg, Lüchow, Dannenberg, Hitzacker and Soltau were independent administrations and not part of the Ämter system. In addition to their own administration, they also ran their own lesser jurisdictions; the chancery court (Kanzleigericht) in Celle was only responsible for dealing with major offences. Lüneburg achieved even greater independence and had both greater and lesser jurisdictions.

=== Judiciary ===
In the 13th and 14th centuries the regional magistracies (Gogerichte) were responsible for the administration of justice. Their magistrates (Gorichter) were usually freely elected by the community under their jurisdiction, but some were appointed by the duke or a lesser noble.

Their powers of jurisdiction were transferred to the Ämter as the latter became established. Thereafter the Ämter were responsible for the initial handling of civil law matters for the majority of subjects in the principality. More serious crimes would be investigated by the Ämter and the sentence pronounced by the chancery court in Celle, once the case had been referred. Where towns had lesser or higher jurisdictions, the townsfolk would be dealt with in the civic courts. Cases for subjects that came under the jurisdiction of the 'closed aristocratic courts' in Wathlingen and Gartow were heard by the respective lords of the manor (Gutsherren). The chancery court handled all civil and criminal cases involving the nobility and the majority of senior officials.

The chancery court also acted as a court of appeal as did, from 1536, the royal court in Celle that was permanently in session. There was no clear division of responsibility; the choice of court was left to the plaintiff. As a final resort there was the option of appealing to the imperial chamber court (Reichskammergericht) in Wetzlar.

In the Principality of Lüneburg, in addition to the chancery court and the courts at Amt level there existed numerous aristocratic patrimonial courts (Patrimonialgerichte), whose responsibilities were confined to the jurisdiction of specific groups of people and areas. For example, there were so-called "internal, stake, fence, village, road and field courts" (Binnen-, Pfahl-, Zaun-, Dorf-, Straßen- und Feldgerichte.)

For all civil and criminal legal disputes that involved the use of woodland, the "woodland courts" (Holzungsgerichte) were responsible, that met once or twice a year and whose boundaries were independent of the Ämtern. Since the 16th century these courts lost their influence and disputes about forested land were decided by other courts.

From 1562 the highest, ecclesiastical court was the consistory (Konsistorium) in Celle, which was responsible for all marital matters, cases between churches and cases between the laity and the clergy.

=== Landschaft of the Principality of Lüneburg ===
In the 17th century the Lüneburg Landschaft emerged as an institution representing the estates (Landstände) of the Principality of Lüneburg. In addition to participating in legislation and approving taxes, it had a right to represent various administrative bodies and was thus involved in the administration of the Principality.

=== Military service ===
Up to the 16th century military forces were provided by the Lehnsmiliz, knights required to do military service, and the militia (under the Heerbann) who were drawn from elements of the rural population. The conscription of the Lehnsmiliz resulted from their feudal obligations to the dukes of Celle; that of the militia from their obligation to their landlords.

With the advent of firearms in the 15th century, mercenaries were increasingly engaged; they were committed to serve for a particular conflict and then discharged from the service. To begin with they only supplemented the armies raised by the knights; later they largely replaced them in the 17th century because of their military superiority.

Until the 17th century there were very few standing armies. Only the Duke's bodyguard and the soldiers guarding the residence in Celle were in the permanent employ of the dukes.

In the early stages of the Thirty Years War, the fighting troops were still made up of mercenaries until, in 1631, under the Calenberg duke, George, troops were organised for the entire Welf House of Brunswick-Lüneburg that, for the first time, provided a permanent standing army in the service of the dukes. After the disbandment of the common army for the overall House of Brunswick-Lüneburg in 1644, elements of its regiments joined the Principality of Lüneburg and formed the Lüneburg Army.

In 1650 troop strengths were reduced at the request of the estates (Landsstände), but were expanded significantly again in 1651 and 1665 during the rule of Duke George William. The troops were deployed during this period in several European wars, including those in Venice, Spain and the Netherlands. Although the Principality of Lüneburg was not directly involved in these conflicts, the dukes in Celle made their troops available to foreign forces in return for payment for their services.

When the Principality of Lüneburg merged with the Electorate of Hanover, the Lüneburg Army was united with the Hanoverian Army.

== Princes of Lüneburg ==
The rulers of Lüneburg, like those of other principalities within the Duchy of Brunswick-Lüneburg, were entitled to use the title "Duke of Brunswick-Lüneburg" as well as "Prince of Lüneburg".

See List of the rulers of Lüneburg.
