= Rudolf I of Saxe-Wittenberg =

Ascanian noble, Elector of Saxony in 1356

Rudolf I
- Duke of Saxe-Wittenberg; Elector of Saxony
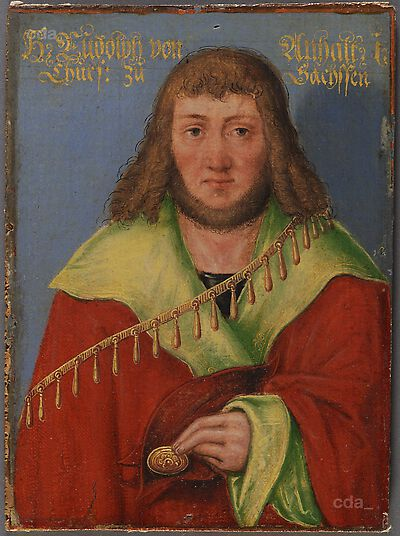
- Portrait c. 1578–1580
- Reign: 1298–1356
- Born: c. 1284
- Died: 12 March 1356 (aged 72); Wittenberg, Saxe-Wittenberg, Holy Roman Empire
- Buried: Wittenberg
- Noble family: House of Ascania
- Spouses: Jutta of Brandenburg; Kunigunde of Poland; Agnes of Lindow-Ruppin
- Issue: Rudolf II, Duke of Saxe-Wittenberg; Wenceslaus I, Duke of Saxe-Wittenberg
- Father: Albert II, Duke of Saxony
- Mother: Agnes of Habsburg

Rudolf I (c. 1284 – 12 March 1356), a member of the House of Ascania, was Duke of Saxe-Wittenberg from 1298 until his death. By the Golden Bull of 1356 he was acknowledged as Elector of Saxony.

== Life ==
Rudolf was the eldest son of the Saxon duke Albert II, who initially ruled jointly with his brother John I but gradually concentrated on the Ascanian Saxe-Wittenberg territory. Rudolf's father consolidated his position by marrying the Habsburg princess Agnes, a daughter of King Rudolf I of Germany, whom he had elected King of the Romans in 1273.

Upon the death of Margrave Henry III of Meissen in 1288, Duke Albert II applied at his father-in-law King Rudolf for the enfeoffment of his son and heir with the Saxon County palatine on the Unstrut river, which ensued a long lasting dispute with the eager clan of the Wettin dynasty. Albert's attempts to secure the succession in the lands of the extinct Saxon counts of Brehna were more successful: when their fiefs were reverted to the Empire in 1290, the king enfeoffed Albert's son Rudolf cum annexis.

After Rudolf of Habsburg had died, Duke Albert II on 27 April 1292 wielded the Saxon electoral vote, electing Adolf of Nassau. In 1295 he could again enlarge his Saxon territories, when he acquired the County of Gommern. In 1296 the Ascanian lands were finally divided into the duchies of Saxe-Wittenberg and Saxe-Lauenburg. Upon King Adolf's deposition and death in 1298, Albert II again exercised the Saxon electoral dignity by voting for his brother-in-law Albert I of Habsburg.

=== Accession ===
Still a minor when his father died on 25 August 1298, Rudolf I succeeded as Duke of Saxe-Wittenberg under the tutelage of his mother Agnes of Habsburg acting as guardian and regent. She gradually introduced him to the business of government at the court of her brother, King Albert I, in preparation for his role as ruling duke. Rudolf's first official act as holder of the electoral dignity of the Imperial Archmarshal (Archimarescallus) was the consent to King Albert's request to enfeoff the duchies of Austria and Styria to Albert's sons Rudolf III, Frederick the Fair and Leopold. When in February 1300, King Albert I tried to grant his eldest son Rudolf sole possession of Austria, the ecclesiastical prince-electors refused and a military conflict erupted. Young Rudolf of Saxe-Wittenberg, however, was not involved in this conflict; he remained under the care of his mother until 1302.

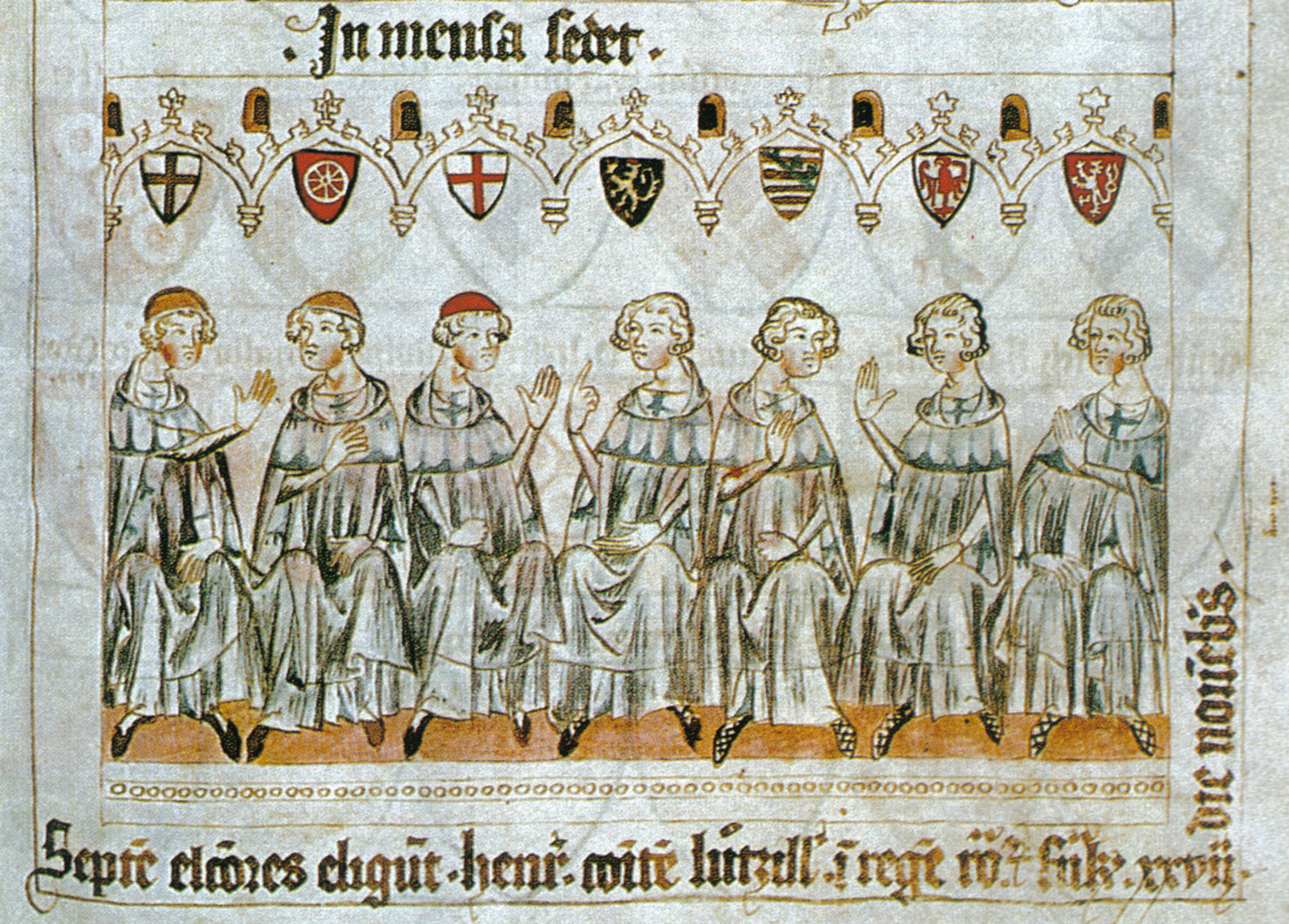
Imperial election of 1308: the Seven Electors voting for Henry, Rudolf (3rd from right) wielding the Saxon vote (Codex Balduini Trevirorum, c. 1340)

In 1302, Rudolf finally assumed the rule over Saxe-Wittenberg himself. Initially, he was anxious to further strengthen the country's sovereignty. To achieve this, he first of all had to make his Saxe-Lauenburg relatives, John II, Eric I, and Albert III agree that he, and not his eldest cousin John II, had inherited his father's rank as Saxon elector. Of great importance was Rudolf's vote in the Imperial election of 1308, upon the assassination of his uncle Albert I of Habsburg. After some time of back and forth negotiations, Count Henry of Luxembourg was elected on 27 November 1308. Duke Rudolf I voted for Henry and also assisted him by providing money and troops, earning him the goodwill of the newly elected emperor.

=== Double election of 1314 ===
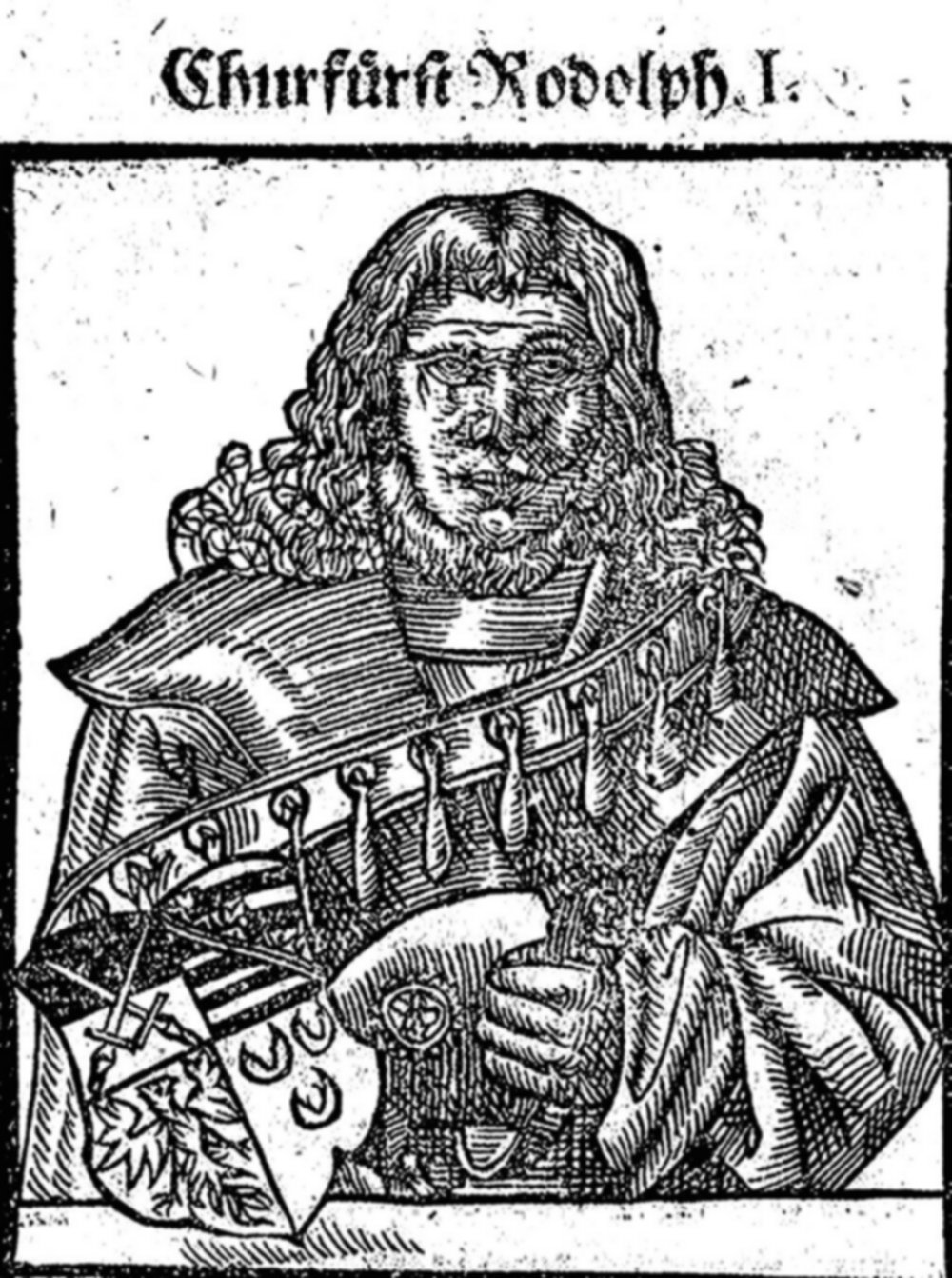
Woodcut of Rudolf from the 16th century

Nevertheless, Henry of Luxembourg died on 23 August 1313 and the next election of the King of the Romans was held on 19 October 1314 in Sachsenhausen near Frankfurt. For the first time, two candidates in the election claimed to have won it, the Wittelsbach duke Louis the Bavarian and Rudolf's Habsburg cousin Frederick the Fair. Louis had received five of the seven votes, to wit that of Duke John II of Saxe-Lauenburg, rivallingly claiming the Saxon electoral dignity, Archbishop Baldwin of Trier, the legitimate King John of Bohemia, Archbishop Peter of Mainz, and the Ascanian margrave Waldemar of Brandenburg. Rudolf's preferred candidate, the anti-king Frederick the Fair, received in the same election four of the seven votes, one each from the deposed King Henry of Bohemia, thereby illegitimately assuming electoral power, Archbishop Henry II of Cologne, Louis's brother Count Palatine Rudolf of Bavaria, and Rudolf I himself, also claiming the Saxon electoral power.

The two kings met in the Battle of Mühldorf on 28 September 1322; Louis of Bavaria emerged victoriously as the German king, he was eventually crowned Holy Roman Emperor in 1328. As a supporter of the Habsburg side, Rudolf I had to face the consequences: when in 1320, the Ascanian rulers of Brandenburg became extinct with the death of Margrave Henry the Younger, Rudolf I, who had administered Brandenburg as regent since 1319, claimed the margraviate as an Ascanian fief. King Louis, however, held that he could not grant the fief to an elector who had voted against him, and gave it to his own son, Louis V, to strengthen his dynasty's position. With the Margraviate of Brandenburg, Louis V also received the electoral vote and the post of an Imperial arch-chamberlain.

=== Imperial politics ===
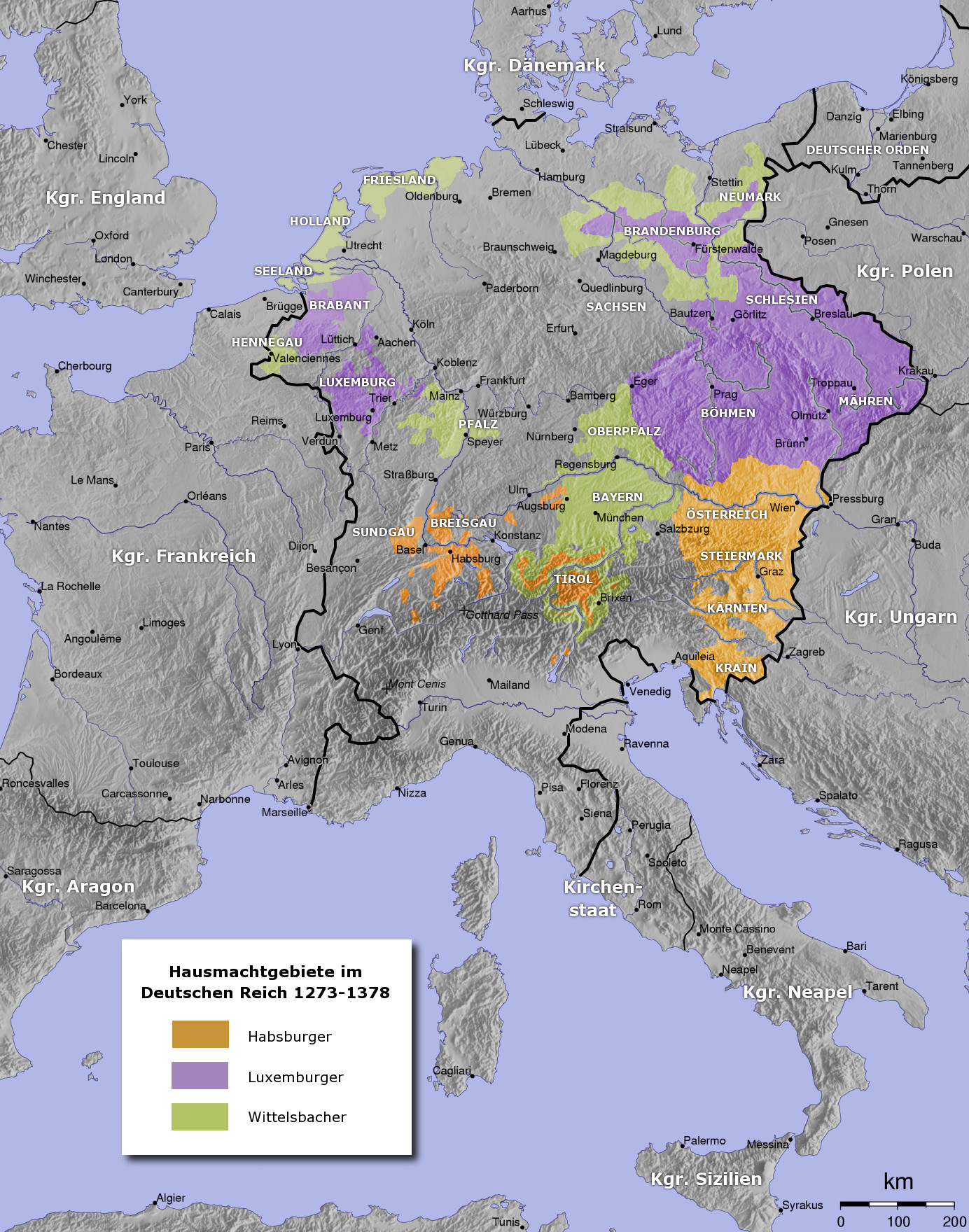
Dynastic domains in the Holy Roman Empire 1273–1378 Habsburg Luxembourg Wittelsbach

After these and other sanctions by the Wittelsbach emperor, Duke Rudolf I decided to subordinate himself and his brother Wenceslas to Louis for tactical reasons and attempted to prove himself as a true support. From then on, he acted as mediator in the ongoing disputes between various princes, which allowed him to build up useful connections. For example, he organised a meeting between six of the prince-electors promulgating the constitutional Declaration of Rhense in 1338. Rudolf, on the other hand, had a friendly relationship with Pope Benedict XII, who had declared the emperor excommunicated. Thereafter, Louis finally changed his opinion of Rudolf and leased parts of the March of Lusatia, including the cities of Brietz, Fürstenwalde and Beeskow to him for a 12-year period.

Under his mother's influence, he began the expulsion of Jews from Wittenberg, which continued until the middle of the 14th century. Rudolf also outlawed the Slavic languages originally spoken in his territory. He founded the All Saints' Monastery in Wittenberg, from which the later All Saints' Church evolved. Around 1340, he built Wittenberg Castle as a suitable residence for himself and his descendants. In the 16th century, his Wettin successor Frederick III constructed a Renaissance castle on the foundations of Rudolf's castle. To cover the increasing cost of his Imperial policies, he began to sell rights, such as market rights, coinage rights, low justice, customs and escort rights. These rights were the roots of the first communal structures in the Wittenberg area. In 1306, he organised defensive and offensive alliances with several cities; the cities expanded these alliances in subsequent years.

=== Charles IV ===
During his mediations, Rudolf also built up a close relationship with the Bohemian court in Prague, which became apparent with the election of King John's son and heir, the Luxembourg prince Charles IV (1316-1378) as King of the Romans on 11 July 1346. Charles was crowned in Bonn on 26 November 1346, and Duke Rudolf I was the only elector who was present at this solemn ceremony.

His close ties to Charles IV were rewarded when he received the Altmark territory in 1347, whereby the Elbe river became the boundary between Saxony and Brandenburg. In addition, he received the Imperial Forestry at Frankfurt an der Oder in 1348, as compensation for his expenses as elector. Under his direction, the Mecklenburg lords John I and Albert II became Dukes and Imperial Princes. However, his relation with Charles deteriorated when in 1350 Charles confirmed the Wittelsbach margrave Louis V as Elector of Brandenburg and Margrave of Lusatia. This confirmation aroused Rudolf's indignation and he temporarily withdrew from the Prague court. Both reconciled after Charles IV gave Rudolf the Walchenhof Court in the Malá Strana district of Prague.

Rudolf's greatest success came on 4 October 1355 when the emperor drafted the Golden Bull, the bulla aurea Saxonica, defining the future law of the Empire. This bull stipulated primogeniture for all electorates: they were declared indivisible; the eldest son inherits the entire principality, or, if an elector has no sons, an elector's younger brother inherits. A prince-elector could cast his vote from the age of 18 and rule the electorate from the age of 21. The Duke of Saxe-Wittenberg was confirmed as the Elector of Saxony. In return, the Saxe-Lauenburg branch of the House of Ascania finally lost all claims to the electoral vote and to the associated dignity of Imperial Archmarshal as well as the right to carry a sword in the imperial diet.

Rudolf I died on 12 March 1356 in Wittenberg and was succeeded by his eldest surviving son Duke Rudolf II (c. 1307 – 1370). He was initially buried in the Wittenberg Franciscan Church; in 1883, his mortal remains were transferred to the All Saints' Church. The Saxe-Wittenberg branch of the Ascanian dynasty became extinct with the death of Rudolf's grandson Duke Albert III in 1412, whereafter the Wittenberg estates and the Saxon electoral dignity passed to the Wettin margraves of Meissen.

== Marriage and issue ==
Electoral arms of the dukes of Saxe-Wittenberg

Rudolf I married three times:

In 1298 he married Margravine Jutta (Brigitte) of Brandenburg (died: 9 May 1328 in Wittenberg), a daughter of Margrave Otto V of Brandenburg. They had the following children:

1. Albert (died young, on 4 July 1329)
2. John (died young, in Wittenberg)
3. Anna (mentioned in 1309 – died in Wittenberg in 1328 or 1329), married Bernard of Poland (died c. 1356)
4. Rudolf II (c. 1307 – 6 December 1370), married Countess Elizabeth of Lindow and Ruppin
5. Elisabeth (died 1353), married before 22 June 1344 with Prince Waldemar I of Anhalt-Zerbst (died 3 September 1367)
6. Agnes (died 4 January 1338), married Prince Bernhard III of Anhalt-Bernburg (c. 1300 – 20 August 1348)
7. Otto (died 30 March 1350), married Elizabeth of Brunswick-Lüneburg (d. 1384), a daughter of Duke William II of Brunswick-Lüneburg and Hedwig of Ravensberg; their son was Albert of Saxe-Wittenberg, Duke of Lüneburg
8. Beatrix (died in the Coswig Convent, after 26 February 1345), married on 27 January 1337 to Prince Albert II of Anhalt-Zerbst (1306 – 1362)

Rudolf married Kunigunde of Poland on 28 August 1328 (c. 1298 – 9 April 1333 in Wittenberg), the daughter of King Władysław I the Elbow-high of Poland and Hedwig of Kalisz. They had one son:

1. Miesko (c. 1330 – 1350), married Eudoxia

He married Agnes of Lindow-Ruppin in 1333 (18 December 1314 – 9 May 1343 in Wittenberg), the daughter of Count Ulrich of Lindow-Ruppin and the widow of Lord Henry II of Mecklenburg (d. 1329). They had the following children:

1. William (died young)
2. Wenceslaus I (c. 1337 – 1388 in Celle), married on 23 January 1367 with Cecilia of Carrara (c. 1350 – between 1430 and 1434), the daughter of Francesco I da Carrara of Padua
3. Helena (died 2 April 1367), married in 1353 with John I of Hardeck, Burgrave of Magdeburg

Rudolf I of Saxe-Wittenberg House of Ascania Born: c. 1284 Died: 12 March 1356
Regnal titles
Preceded by Albert II	Duke of Saxe-Wittenberg; 1298–1356	Succeeded by Rudolf II
New creation	Elector of Saxony; 1356	Succeeded by Rudolf II
