= War of the Lüneburg Succession =

Military conflict

Coat of arms of the Principality of Lüneburg.

The War of the Lüneburg Succession (German: Lüneburger Erbfolgekrieg) was a conflict over the succession to the Principality of Lüneburg that broke out in 1370 in north Germany and lasted, with interruptions, for 18 years. After William II of Lüneburg died without male heirs in 1369, the "Older House of Lüneburg" was extinguished. According to the inheritance rules of the House of Welf to which William belonged, the Duke of Brunswick, Magnus II Torquatus, was entitled to succeed. However, Charles IV ruled that this Imperial Fief should be returned to the Empire and enfeoffed Albert of Saxe-Wittenberg and his uncle, Wenceslas with the Principality, thereby triggering the war.

The town of Lüneburg supported the Wittenbergs, taking the opportunity to escape from the immediate lordship of the Duke, and destroyed the ducal castle on the Kalkberg on 1 February 1371. This forced the Duke to relocate his residence to Celle. An attempt on 21 October 1371, Saint Ursula's day, to defeat Lüneburg militarily and reinstate the old ducal rights failed. During the military conflict in the years that followed, neither the Brunswicks nor the Wittenbergs were able to assert their claims, and it was only through the Peace of Hanover in 1373 that the war came to an end, at least for the time being.

In accordance with the agreements reached at Hanover, the regency would alternate between the Welfs and the Wittenbergs. The treaty was further reinforced by the marriage of the two eldest sons of Magnus Torquatus, Frederick and Bernard I, to the two daughters of Wenceslas, as well as the marriage of Magnus's widow to Albert of Saxe-Wittenberg. Henry, the younger brother of Frederick and Bernard, however, rejected the agreements and continued the war. After the Battle of Winsen in 1388, when Wenceslas lost his life, possibly a result of poisoning, rule over the Principality was assumed by the House of Welf, in accordance with the provisions of the Treaty of Hanover, dating from 1374. In 1389, a treaty of inheritance between the Welfs and the Ascanians was concluded, the 1374 treaty was abolished and the Principality was finally secured for the Welfs.

== Background ==
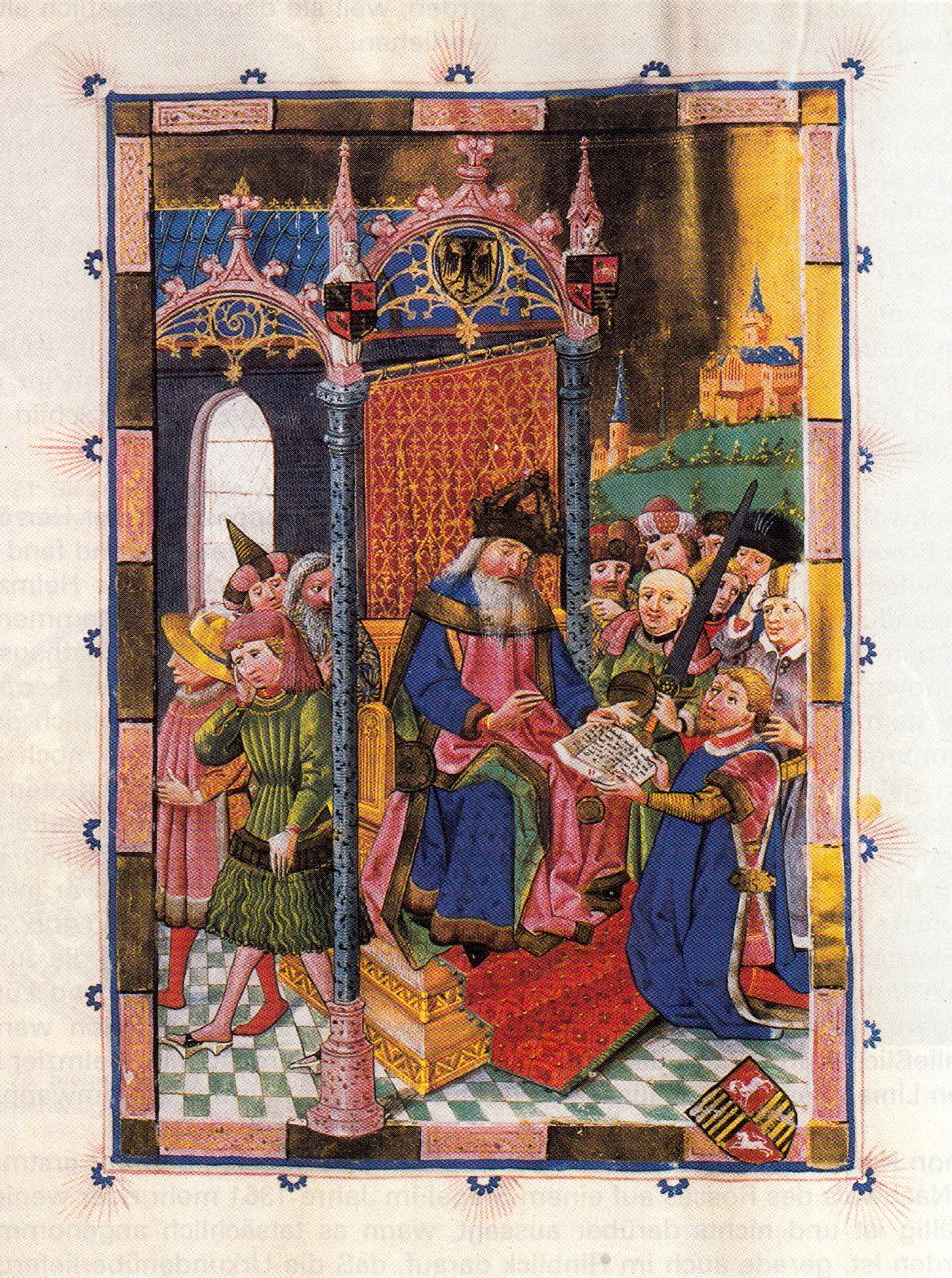
Emperor Charles IV enfeoffed Albert of Saxe-Wittenberg with the Principality of Lüneburg. 1442 illustration from the Lüneburg Sachsenspiegelhandschrift

In 1355, the Duke of Lüneburg married his daughter Mechtild to her cousin Louis, the heir to the throne in the Principality of Brunswick, and appointed him as his heir and successor in Lüneburg. In the event that Louis predeceased him, William retained the right to choose a successor from his brothers. In the same year, however, Emperor Charles IV guaranteed the succession of Lüneburg on the death of William, who had no sons, to the Ascanian dukes of Wittenberg in the form of an Eventualbelehnung, a fief contingent on the death of William. Charles IV rejected the female inheritance law and regarded the fief, on the death of William, as returning to the Empire. The official appointment of William to the dukedom in 1235, in which the cognatic succession had been assured, led to further negotiations between the Duke and the Emperor, but these did not reach a conclusion. The assessment of earlier research that assumed William had originally supported the contingent enfeoffment of Albert of Saxe-Wittenberg, is regarded as unfounded in more recent research. When Louis died in 1367, William appointed his brother Magnus II as his successor and made him his co-regent in the same year. When William died two years later, the Wittenbergs reaffirmed their claims to the Principality and Emperor Charles IV enfeoffed Duke Albert, his uncle Rudolf, who died shortly thereafter, and Wenceslas with Lüneburg.

== Conflict ==
=== William's death to St. Ursula's Night ===
When William died in 1369, Magnus was on the Danish side in the war against the Hanseatic seaside towns of Rostock, Lübeck, Wismar and Stralsund. Since Lüneburg had a close connection with these towns through its Hanseatic membership, the first tensions with their new lords were beginning to develop. These increased when Magnus demanded the confiscation of salt rights which were owned by his enemies. In the following months, tensions intensified. Magnus extorted high payments of money from Lüneburg, forced the town to renounce its privileges, and began to strengthen his occupation of the castle on the Kalkberg and its fortifications. The monastery church was partially demolished, in order to have a clear field of fire on the town. In March and June Charles IV appealed to Lüneburg to pay homage to the dukes of Wittenberg. In December, he repeated this demand accompanying it with the threat of heavy penalties. In January 1371, Lüneburg obtained a legal opinion, which confirmed Lüneburg's obligation, and so they complied by paying homage to Albert of Saxe-Wittenberg and Wenceslas of Saxe-Wittenberg. In return, the Wittenbergs secured extensive privileges for Lüneburg secured. The dukes confirm the sovereignty of its court, its right to administer the saltworks and to mint coins. The town also acquired the Kalkberg and the castellan's settlement (Burgmannsiedlung) at the foot of the hill as well as the right to slight the ducal castle on the Kalkberg. At the beginning of February 1370, the townsfolk of Lüneburg succeeded in capturing the castle, which was still occupied by Magnus' soldiers.

Hanover, too, had in the meantime decided to pay homage in a similar way; after obtaining a legal opinion, they swore an oath of homage. The town received extensive privileges and the right to slight the ducal castle in Lauenrode. In addition to Lüneburg and Hanover, the lords of Mandelsloh, in particular, placed themselves on the side of the Wittenberg dukes. The small towns and villages, as well as the majority of the Lüneburg nobility, remained, on the other hand, loyal to Magnus. In October, Magnus succeeded in gathering an army of 700 knights and squires in Celle. On St. Ursula's Night, the night of 20/21 October, he attempted to capture Lüneburg. After the ducal troops had succeeded in climbing the walls of the town, there were struggles in the streets between the townsfolk of Lüneburg and the Duke's men. The battle was interrupted several times for negotiations, but continued until the surrender of the ducal troops. In the battle, a total of 54 ducal fighters and 27 members of the town were killed, including several mayors and master salters, had fallen. Some of the captured knights were charged with being robber-barons, but the majority were released for ransom.

=== Reconciliation of Hanover (1373) ===
In the following years, the Lüneburg countryside was devastated by numerous battles and campaigns. These, however, were only partly due to the succession conflict - in addition there was wanton arson and looting by robber barons. In addition to the Ascanians and the Welfs, foreign towns and princes were increasingly involved as allies. Thus Magnus entered into a military alliance with the Danish king. In 1373, at an specially arranged meeting in Pirna, an imperial mediation attempt took place. Since Magnus did not appear, however, the Imperial Ban against him was renewed and fighting continued. In 1373, Duke Magnus was killed in a battle at Leveste on the Deister on 25 July 1373. After his death, a treaty - the Reconciliation of Hanover - was agreed between Wenceslas and his nephew Albert, on the one hand, and the widow of Magnus II and her sons on the other. According to the treaty, the estates of the Principality were to pay homage both to the Welfs and to the Ascanians, and the two noble houses would govern the state alternately. Initially, the land would be given to the two Ascanians from Wittenberg, and after their death it would go to the sons of the fallen Duke Magnus II. After their death, rule of the Principality was to revert to the Ascanians. In order to underpin the agreement, in 1374 Albert of Saxe-Lüneburg married Catharina, the widow of Magnus II. The two still underage sons were also married in 1386 to members of the Ascanian house. Frederick of Brunswick-Lüneburg married Anna of Saxe-Wittenberg and Bernard of Brunswick-Lüneburg married Margareta of Saxony, both women were daughters of Wenceslas. The treaty also envisaged the creation of a statutory body representing the estates, which was to supervise the treaty.

=== Wenceslas' death and renunciation of the Principality ===
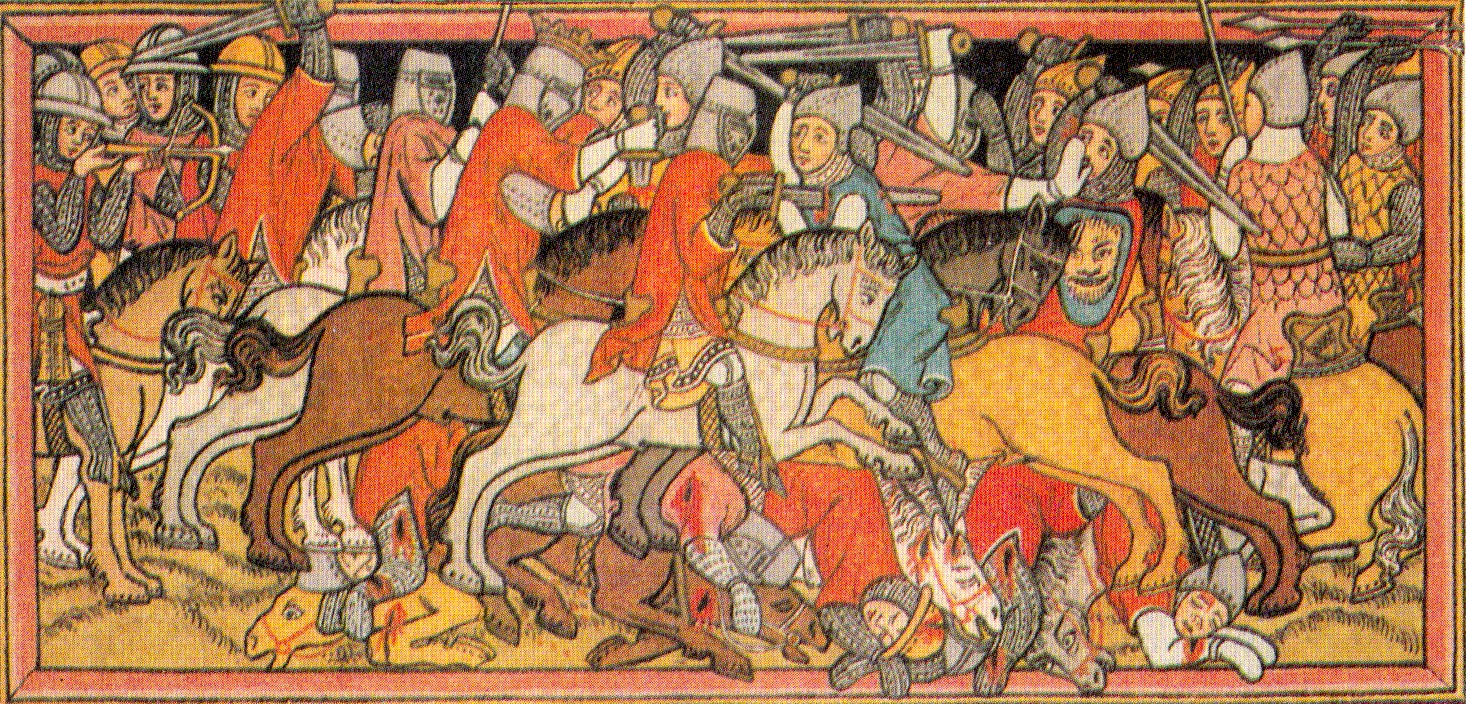
By winning the battle on the Strietfield at Winsen in 1388, Duke Henry I secured the Principality for the House of Welf.

The following year, the feud between the nobility and plundering by robber knights continued. In 1385, the castle of Ricklingen, where the Mandelslohs resided, was besieged. When a catapult threw a heavy rock at the troops of Duke Albert, he was hit, and died on 28 June 1385. In the wake of his death, Elector Wenceslas appointed Bernard, his brother-in-law, as co-regent involved him in the government. But his younger brother Henry did not agree with this ruling, and after vain attempts to reach an agreement, the fight flared up again in the spring of 1388. Elector Wenceslas had to assemble an army without the help of Bernard, supported by the town of Lüneburg. From Winsen an der Aller, he wanted to attack Celle, which was held by Henry and his mother. During the preparations, however, Elector Wenceslas fell seriously ill and died shortly thereafter. According to legend, he was poisoned. Lüneburg continued the preparations, formed an alliance with the Bishop of Minden and Count of Schaumburg and set up his own army. On 28 May 1388, battle was joined at Winsen an der Aller; it ended in victory for Henry. According to the provisions of the Treaty of Hanover from the year 1373, after the death of Wensceslas, the Principality passed to the House of Welf. In 1389, an inheritance agreement between the Welfs and the Ascanians was concluded, the treaty of 1374 was abolished, and the Principality was finally secured for the Welfs.

== Aftermath ==
The Welfs had secured the Principality of Lüneburg for their house, but had been plunged heavily into debt and had pawned most of their ducal estates and castles. As a result of the slighting of the castle on the Kalkberg and the granting of extensive privileges, Lüneburg secured its independence from the Duke, and in the following centuries almost attained Imperial immediacy. The Welf debt also led to the conclusion of the Lüneburg Sate, a treaty in which the dukes assured the estates of extensive privileges and submitted themselves to jurisdiction by the estates.

== Sources ==
- Wilhelm Havemann: Geschichte der Lande Braunschweig und Lüneburg. 3 Bände. Nachdruck. Hirschheydt, Hannover 1974/75, ISBN 3-7777-0843-7 (Original issue: Verlag der Dietrich'schen Buchhandlung, Göttingen, 1853-1857)
- Hans Patze (Begr.): Geschichte Niedersachsen. 7 volumes. Hahnsche Buchhandlung, Hanover, 1977- (Publications by the Historic Commission for Lower Saxony and Bremen)
