= Wenceslaus I of Saxe-Wittenberg =

Elector of Saxony from 1370 to 1388

Wenceslas I
- Duke of Saxe-Wittenberg
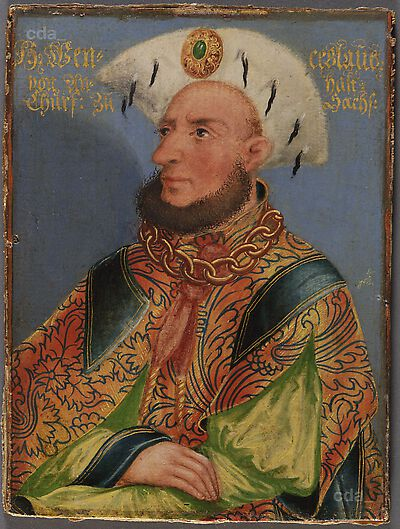
- Portrait c. 1578–1580

Elector of Saxony
- Reign: 6 December 1370 – 15 May 1388
- Predecessor: Rudolf II
- Successor: Rudolf III
- Born: c. 1337
- Died: 15 May 1388; Celle
- Spouse: Cecilia of Carrara
- House: Ascania
- Father: Rudolf I, Duke of Saxe-Wittenberg
- Mother: Agnes of Lindow-Ruppin

Wenceslas I, Duke of Saxe-Wittenberg (c. 1337 – 15 May 1388, in Celle) from the House of Ascania ruled from 1370 to 1388 and was a prince-elector of the Holy Roman Empire as well as Prince of Lüneburg. He was the son of Rudolf I and his 3rd wife, Agnes of Lindow-Ruppin.

== Life ==
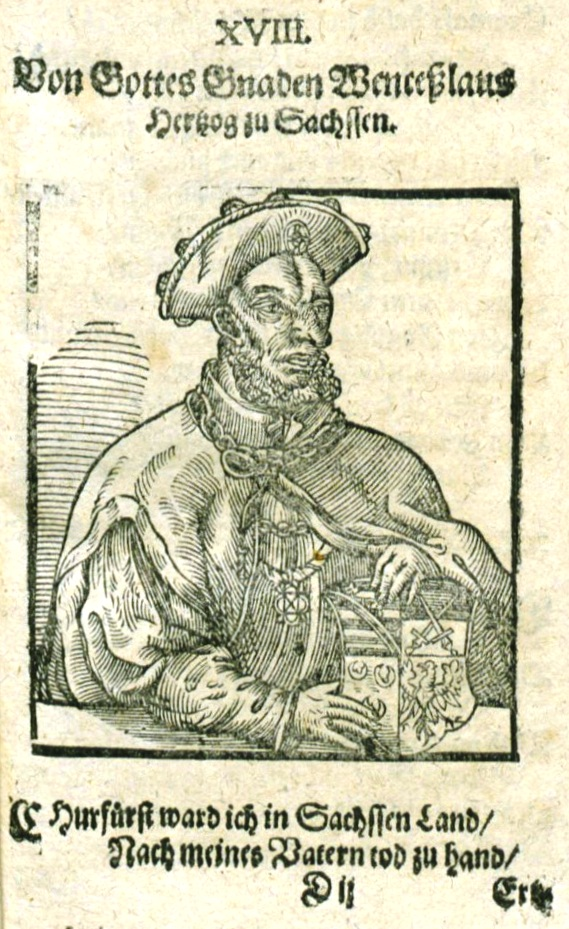
Woodcut of Wenceslaus from the 16th century

In 1370 Wenceslas succeeded his brother Rudolf II. In 1376 he took part, as a prince-elector, in the election of Wenceslas IV of Bohemia as King of Germany and in 1377 stood by Emperor Charles IV in the Altmark. He was frequently active in the affairs of the empire on the side of the emperor. Charles IV granted Albert of Saxe-Wittenberg and his uncle Wenceslas I - and their house - the underlying entitlement to Brunswick and Lüneburg, but the two of them were unsuccessful in claiming this right through the Lüneburg War of Succession. In 1388 Wenceslas finally lost his claim at the battle of Winsen an der Aller.

He was in conflict with the Duke of Brabant over the right to carry the Imperial Sword ahead of the emperor.

He made state peace treaties with Anhalt, Magdeburg and Meißen.

During the siege of Celle Wenceslas died suddenly of a serious illness. Even his contemporaries suspected that he had been administered poison and that that was the cause of death. According to other traditional accounts, he died on 18 August 1402 which has however caused confusion over his grave.

== Descendants ==
On 23 January 1376 Wenceslas married Cecilia of Carrara (d. 1435), daughter of Francis of Carrara, Count of Padua. They had the following children:

- Rudolf III, Duke of Saxe-Wittenberg
- Wenceslas (died 1402)
- Erich (died as child)
- Anna (died 1426) who married Frederick I, Duke of Brunswick-Lüneburg
- Albert III (died 1422) Elector of Saxony
- Margaret of Saxony who married Bernhard of Brunswick-Lüneburg

== Ancestors ==
Ancestors of Wenceslaus I of Saxe-Wittenberg

16. Bernard III, Duke of Saxony
8. Albert I, Duke of Saxony
17. Judith (Jutta) of Poland
4. Albert II, Duke of Saxony
18. Otto I, Duke of Brunswick-Lüneburg
9. Helen of Brunswick-Lünenburg
19. Matilda of Brandenburg
2. Rudolf I, Duke of Saxe-Wittenberg
20. Albert IV, Count of Habsburg
10. Rudolph I of Germany
21. Hedwig of Kyburg
5. Agnes of Habsburg
22. Burkhard V, Count of Hohenberg
11. Gertrude of Hohenberg
23. Mechtild of Tübingen
1. Wenceslas I, Duke of Saxe-Wittenberg
24. Gebhard I, Count of Lindow
12. Günther I, Count of Lindow
6. Ulrich I, Count of Lindow-Ruppin
13. Euphemia of Rügen
3. Agnes of Lindow-Ruppin
28. Henry the Elder, Count of Schladen
14. Meinher, Count of Schladen
29. Luckard
7. Adelaide of Schladen
30. Herman of Werberg
15. Adelaide of Werberg
31. Luckard of Dorstadt

== Literature ==
- Lorenz Friedrich Beck: Herrschaft and Territorium des Herzöge of Saxe-Wittenberg (1212–1422). Potsdam, 2000. ISBN 3-932981-63-4
- Heinrich Kühne: Die Askanier. Drei Kastanien Verlag, 1999. ISBN 3-933028-14-0
- Georg Hirschfeld: Geschichte der Sächsisch-Askanischen Prince-Electoren. Julius Sittenfeld, Berlin 1884.
- W. of Sommerfeld (1896). "Wenceslas" . Allgemeine Deutsche Biographie (in German). Vol. 41. Leipzig: Duncker & Humblot. pp. 735–736.

Wenceslaus I of Saxe-Wittenberg House of Ascania Born: about 1337 Died: 15 May 1388
German nobility
Preceded by Rudolf II	Elector of Saxony; 1370–1388	Succeeded by Rudolf III
Preceded by Magnus Torquatus	Prince of Lüneburg; 1370–1388 with his nephew Albert (1370–1385)	Succeeded by Bernard I and Henry I
