= Albert I, Duke of Saxony =

German noble (c. 1175–1260)

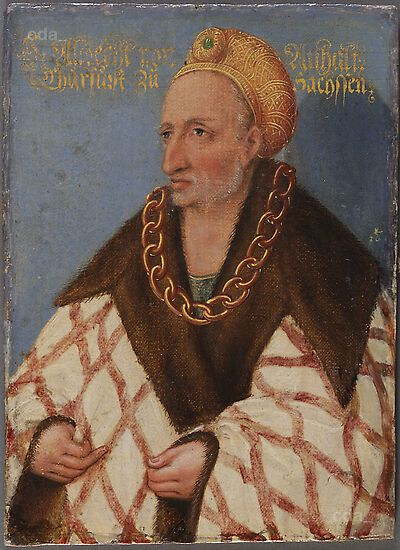
- Portrait c. 1578–1580
- Born: c. 1175
- Died: 7 October 1260
- Burial: Lehnin Abbey
- Spouse: Agnes of Austria; Agnes of Thuringia; Helene of Brunswick-Lüneburg
- Issue: Judith of Saxony; John I, Duke of Saxony; Albert II, Duke of Saxony
- House: House of Ascania
- Father: Bernard III, Duke of Saxony
- Mother: Judith (Jutta) of Poland

Albert I (German: Albrecht I; c. 1175 – 7 October 1260) was a Duke of Saxony, Angria, and Westphalia; Lord of Nordalbingia; Count of Anhalt; and Prince-elector and Archmarshal of the Holy Roman Empire. Even though his grandfather Albert the Bear had held the Saxon dukedom between 1138 and 1142, this Albert is counted as the first.

== Biography ==
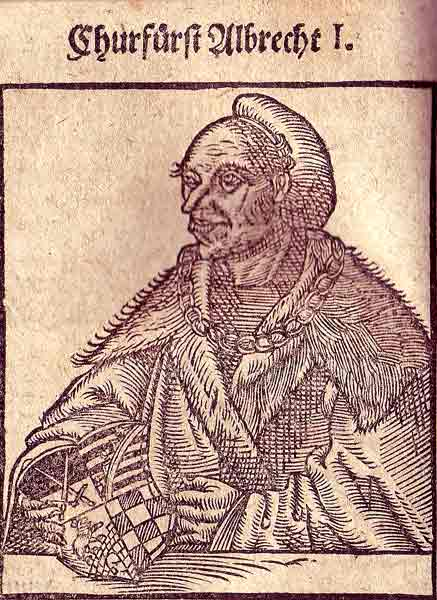
Woodcut of Albert I c. 1550

A member of the House of Ascania, Albert was a younger son of Bernard III, Duke of Saxony, and Judith (Jutta) of Poland, daughter of Mieszko III the Old. After his father's death in 1212, the surviving sons of the late duke divided his lands according to the laws of the House of Ascania: The elder Henry received Anhalt and the younger Albert the Saxon duchy. Albert supported Otto IV, Holy Roman Emperor, in his wars against the Hohenstaufen.

In 1218, Albert's maternal uncle Prince-Archbishop Valdemar of Denmark, who had been deposed from his Prince-Archbishopric of Bremen, found refuge in Saxony, before he joined the Loccum Abbey as a monk.

On 22 July 1227, Albert I asserted as fellow victor in the Battle of Bornhöved, commanding the Holy Roman left flank, his earlier disputed rank as liege lord of the Counts of Schauenburg and Holstein, a privilege, however, lost by his successor John V in 1474. After Bornhöved Albert reinforced and extended his fortress and castle in Lauenburg upon Elbe, which his father Bernard had erected in 1182.

Albert came into conflict with Ludolph I, Prince-Bishop of Ratzeburg, and duly imprisoned Ludolph, where he was badly beaten, and later sent into exile.

After Albert's death at Lehnin Abbey, his sons, the elder John I and the younger Albert II, ruled together as Dukes of Saxony, with John succeeded by his three sons Albert III, Eric I and John II, until before 20 September 1296 they split Saxony into Saxe-Lauenburg and Saxe-Wittenberg, with the brothers jointly ruling the former, and Albert II ruling the latter.

== Marriages and issue ==
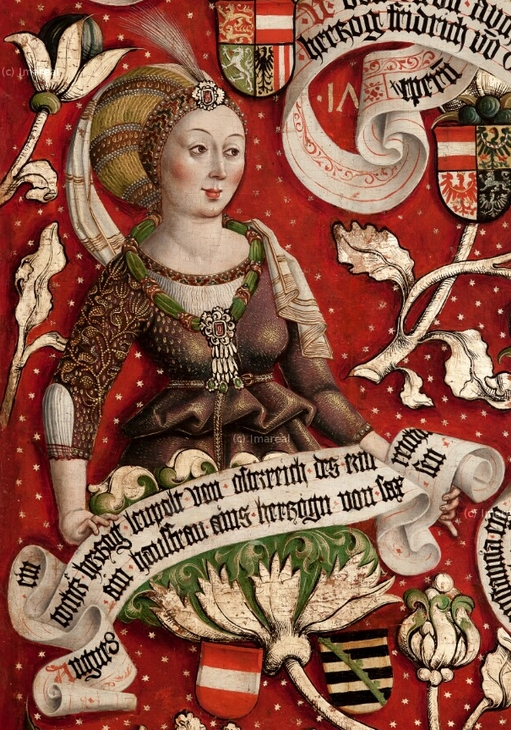
Agnes of Austria, Duchess of Saxony

In 1222, Albert married Agnes of Austria, daughter of Duke Leopold VI of Austria. They had:

- Bernard (d. after 1238)
- Judith of Saxony, (1) ∞ 17 November 1239 King Eric IV of Denmark (1216–1250); and (2) ∞ Burchard VIII of Querfurt-Rosenburg, Burgrave of Magdeburg (1273–1313 recorded)
- Ann Mary (Anna Marie; d. 7 January 1252), ∞ Duke Barnim I of Pomerania
- Bridget (Brigitte Jutta) (d. 4 April 1266), fiancée of Otto of Brunswick and Lunenburg, ∞ before 1255 Margrave John I of Brandenburg [founder of the Johannean line Brandenburg-Stendal]
- Mathilde (Mechthild) (d. 28 July 1266), ∞ ca. 1241 Count John I of Schauenburg and Holstein-Kiel

In 1238, Albert married Agnes of Thuringia (1205–1246), daughter of Landgrave Hermann I of Thuringia. They had:

- Agnes, ∞ Duke Henry III of Silesia-Breslau
- Jutta, ∞ m. 1255, John I, Margrave of Brandenburg; 2m: Burkhard VIII of Rosenburg, Burgrave of Magdeburg
- Margaret (d. 1265), ∞ 1264 Count Helmold III of Schwerin

In 1247, Albert married Helene of Brunswick-Lüneburg (1231–6 September 1273), daughter of Duke Otto the Child

- Helene (1247 – 12 June 1309), (1) ∞ in 1266 Duke Henry III the White of Silesia-Breslau, and (2) ∞ in 1275 Burgrave Frederick III of Nuremberg
- Elisabeth (d. before 2 February 1306), (1) ∞ in 1250 Count John I of Schauenburg and Holstein-Kiel, (2) ∞ in 1265 Count Conrad I of Brehna
- John I (after 1248 – 30 July 1285, in Wittenberg upon Elbe), co-ruling Duke of Saxony with his younger brother Albert II, resigned in 1282, John I married in 1257 Ingeborg (1247/or ca. 1253–1302), daughter or grandchild of Birger Jarl
- Albert (Albrecht) II (1250 – 25 August 1298), co-ruling Duke of Saxony with his elder brother John II (till 1282), then with the sons of the latter (till 1296), then as the sole duke of the partitioned branch duchy Saxe-Wittenberg, ∞ in 1273 Agnes (aka Hagne) (c. 1257 – 11 October 1322, in Wittenberg), daughter of King Rudolph I of Germany
- Rudolf (d. after 1269), ∞ Anna, daughter of Count Palatine Louis of Bavaria

== Sources ==
- Lyon, Jonathan R. (2013). Princely Brothers and Sisters: The Sibling Bond in German Politics, 1100-1250. Cornell University Press.

Albert I, Duke of Saxony House of Ascania Born: c. 1175 Died: 7 October 1260 in Lehnin
Regnal titles
| Preceded by Bernard I | Duke of Saxony; 1212–1260 | Succeeded by John I and Albert II as Dukes of Saxony |
