= Margaret of Brandenburg =

Queen of Poland (1295-1296), Duchess of Saxe-Lauenburg (1302-1308)

Duchess consort of Greater Poland
- Tenure: 1289/1295–8 February 1296

Queen consort of Poland
- Tenure: 1295–8 February 1296
- Coronation: 25 June 1295, Gniezno

Duchess consort of Saxe-Lauenburg
- Tenure: 1302–1308
- Born: between 1270–1281
- Died: after 1314
- Spouse: Przemysł II (m. 1289/1295; died 1296); Albert III of Saxe-Lauenburg (m. 1302; died 1308)
- House: Ascania
- Father: Albert III, Margrave of Brandenburg-Salzwedel
- Mother: Matilda of Denmark

Margaret of Brandenburg-Salzwedel (German: Margareta, Polish: Małgorzata; born between 1270-1281 – died after 1314) was a German noblewoman member of the House of Ascania and by her two marriages Duchess of Greater Poland (between 1289/1295–1296), Queen of Poland (during 1295–1296) and Duchess of Saxe-Lauenburg (during 1302–1308).

She was the youngest child and second daughter of Albert III, Margrave of Brandenburg-Salzwedel and Matilda of Denmark, daughter of King Christopher I.

== Life ==
After the death of his second wife Rikissa of Sweden around 1292, Duke Przemysł II of Greater Poland wished to marry for a third time. The choice of Margaret was mainly for political reasons, because for being a member of the powerful House of Ascania and her Pomerelian ancestry (her maternal grandmother was Sambiria of Pomerelia, later Queen Margaret of Denmark), this would have given to the Greater Poland ruler additional rights over his expected inheritance of Gdańsk Pomerania.

Given the relatively close relationship between Przemysł II and Margaret (both were great-grandchildren of Přemysl Otakar I of Bohemia), they needed a papal dispensation in order to marry. The wedding ceremony took place at unknown date between 1 September 1288 (the day Przemysł's daughter from previous marriage was born) and 26 June 1295 (when Margaret was present at her husband's coronation); as period of mourning after late spouse lasted at least year, the Duke would marry Margaret at earliest in 1289.

Margaret was crowned queen consort of Poland with her husband at Gniezno Cathedral on Sunday 26 June 1295, the day of Saints John and Paul. It was the first coronation of a Polish king and queen in 219 years.

Przemysł II's reign didn't last long. On 8 February 1296, he was kidnapped by men of Margaret's family, with some help from the Polish noble families of Nałęcz and Zaremba and murdered in Rogoźno by Jakub Kaszuba. German chronicler Dietmar of Lübeck pointed that Margaret took part in the conspiracy who killed her husband, due to her family relations. However, it should be noted he was biased towards Margaret, as she and her second husband were partake into actions against Lübeck. Historian Małgorzata Duczmal heavily criticized accusing the Queen of the complicity in the crime, by pointing out that without her husband Margaret would lose both her political and personal perspective, being reduced to widow living in her dower and she would endanger position of her potential children had she been pregnant by Przemysł. Moreover, Duczmal sees as improbable that the Dowager Queen would be entrusted with guardianship over her stepdaughter, Princess Ryksa, had in Poland be any doubt regarding the innocence of King's wife.

While Margaret did received parts of Greater Poland as her dower, according to a Piast dynasty custom, she soon left Poland and returned to Brandenburg, taking Ryksa - betrothed to the Dowager Queen's brother Otto - with her.

Once in her homeland, Margaret was engaged with Nicholas I the Child, Lord of Rostock and member of the House of Mecklenburg; however, in 1299 the betrothal was broken by Nicholas I, who chose to marry a Pomeranian princess. It's unknown if Margaret was taking care of Ryksa during this time, but the Princess of Poland remained with her stepfamily despite Otto's death, until her new engagement in 1300.

Sometime later, another marriage was arranged to Margaret, this time with Albert III, who ruled jointly with his brothers Eric I and John II the Duchy of Saxe-Lauenburg, partitioned from Saxony in 1296. Because Albert III and Margaret were closely related (both were members of the House of Ascania), a papal dispensation was granted in Anagni on 24 September 1302; the marriage was probably celebrated shortly after. They are not known to have any children.

In 1303 Albert III and his brothers divided Saxe-Lauenburg into three branch duchies. Albert III and Margaret then held Saxe-Ratzeburg. After Albert III's death in 1308, his brother Eric I inherited part of Albert's share, while Margaret retained the other part.

Margaret died probably in 1315 and was buried in Ratzeburg Cathedral. On her death Eric I also took her share of Ratzenburg.

== Bibliography ==
Duczmal, Małgorzata (2010). Ryksa Piastówna. Królowa Czech i Polski (1st ed.). Wydawnictwo Manuskrypt. ISBN 83-923110-1-9.

Margaret of Brandenburg House of Ascania Born: 1270/1281 Died: 1315 (?)
Royal titles
Preceded by Wyszesława of Kiev	Queen consort of Poland; 1295–1296	Succeeded by Elizabeth Richeza of Poland
