= Saxe-Wittenberg =

State of the Holy Roman Empire (1296–1356)

Duchy of Saxe-Wittenberg Herzogtum Sachsen-Wittenberg (German)
- 1296–1423
- Banner of arms Coat of arms

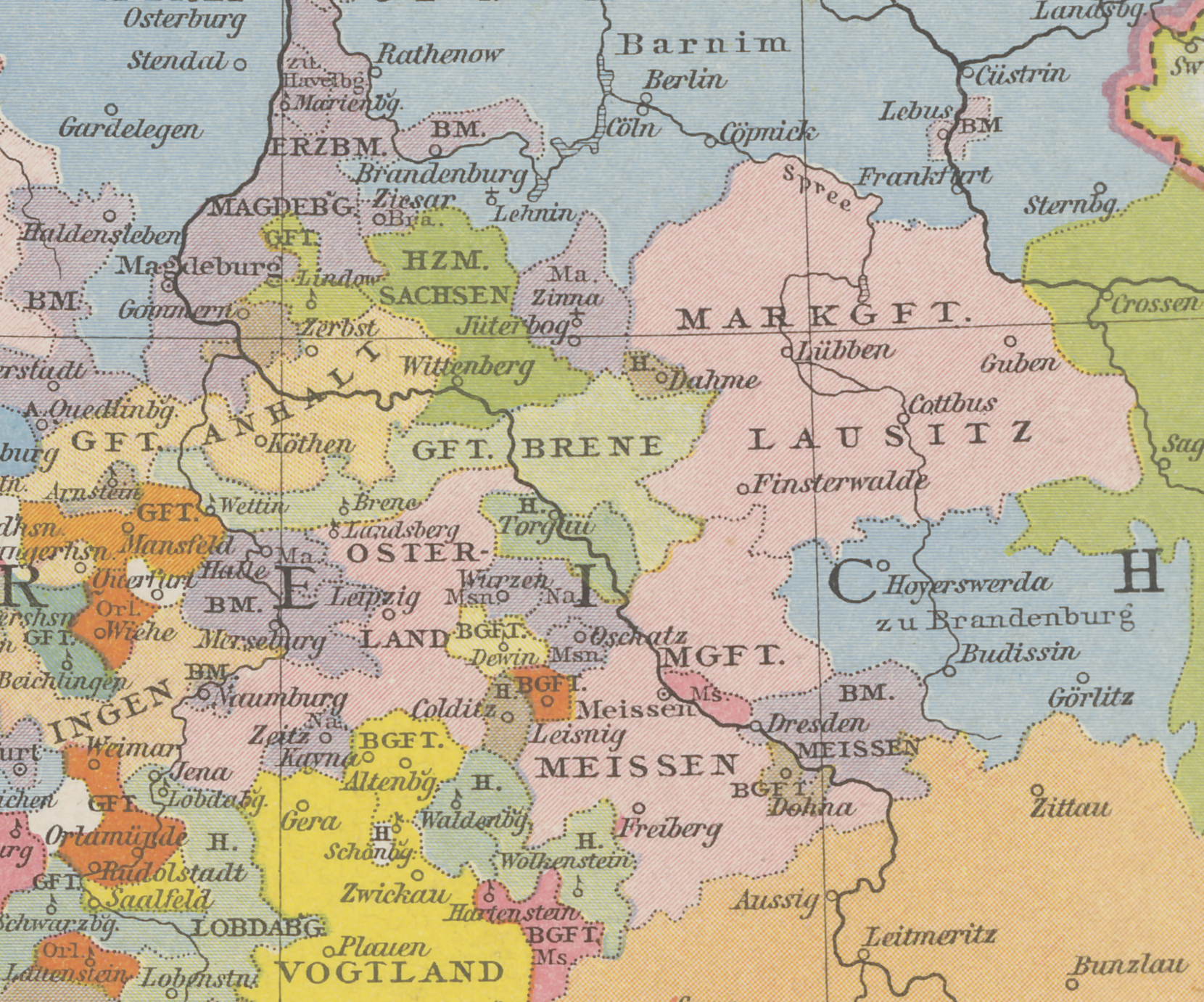
- Duchy of Saxe-Wittenberg (green, centred on the town of Wittenberg)
- Status: Duchy of the Holy Roman Empire
- Capital: Wittenberg
- Religion: Roman Catholic
- Dukes
  - 1296–1298: Albert II of Ascania^{[a]}
  - 1298–1356: Rudolf I of Ascania
- Historical era: Middle Ages
  - Definite partition from Saxony: 1296
  - Electorate: 1356
  - To Wettin margraves of Meissen: 1423
Preceded by	Succeeded by
Duchy of Saxony	Electorate of Saxony
- Today part of: Germany
- a: Albert II was co-ruler of undivided Saxony, with John I, from 1260

The Duchy of Saxe-Wittenberg (German: Herzogtum Sachsen-Wittenberg) was a medieval duchy of the Holy Roman Empire centered at Wittenberg, which emerged after the dissolution of the stem duchy of Saxony. The Ascanian dukes prevailed in obtaining the Saxon electoral dignity until their duchy was finally elevated to the Electorate of Saxony by the Golden Bull of 1356.

== History ==
=== Ascanian struggle for Saxony ===
The Eastphalian count Otto of Ballenstedt (d. 1123), ancestor of the House of Ascania, had married Eilika, a daughter of Duke Magnus of Saxony from the House of Billung. As the Billung male line became extinct upon Magnus's death in 1106, Otto hoped to succeed him, however King Henry V of Germany enfeoffed Count Lothair of Supplinburg. During the following long-term dispute between Henry and Lothair, Otto was able to gain the title of a Saxon (anti-)duke, though only for a short time in 1122.

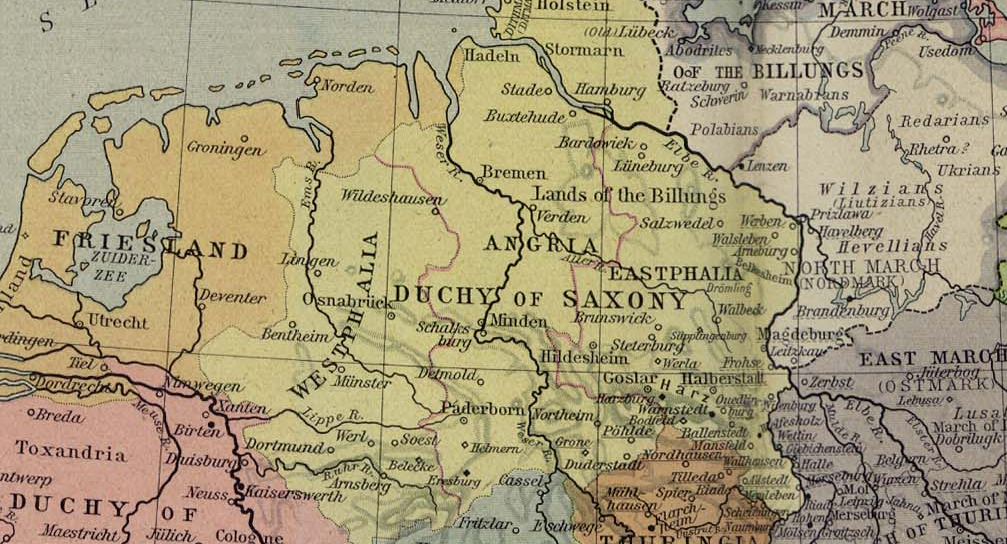
Saxon stem duchy about 1000, map by William Robert Shepherd

Lothair was elected King of the Romans in 1125 and in 1134 he vested Otto's son Albert the Bear with the Saxon Northern March. Upon his death in 1137, Albert once again strived for the Saxon duchy, which however fell to Lothair's son-in-law Henry the Proud from the Bavarian House of Welf. Albert concluded a deal with the rising House of Hohenstaufen: He backed the succession of Conrad of Hohenstaufen as German king, who in turn deprived his Welf rival Henry the Proud of the Saxonian Duchy in 1138 and gave it to Albert. However, his rule was strongly contested by the local nobility and in 1142 Albert finally had to resign as duke in favour of Henry the Proud's son Henry the Lion. Albert later took part in the Wendish Crusade of 1147 and in 1157 established the Margraviate of Brandenburg. He died in 1170.

The third chance for the Ascanians came, when in 1180 ambitious Henry the Lion was deposed as Saxon Duke by Emperor Frederick Barbarossa. Frederick partitioned Saxony among his allies into more than a dozen immediate territories. Among the supporters, Archbishop Philip of Cologne received the largest share as the newly created Duchy of Westphalia. The Saxon ducal title at least passed to late Albert's youngest son, Count Bernhard of Ballenstedt, who nevertheless only ruled over small, mostly Eastphalian fringes of the old duchy.

=== Anhalt, Wittenberg and Lauenburg ===
Duke Bernard died in 1212 and his two surviving sons divided the Saxon heritage: the elder Henry took the old Ascanian allodial possessions around Ballenstedt where he established the Ascanian County of Anhalt, while his younger brother Albert I inherited the title of a Duke of Saxony and retained three territorially unconnected Eastphalian estates on the Elbe river around the towns of Wittenberg and Belzig as well as the northern lordship of Lauenburg with Amt Neuhaus and Land Hadeln at the Elbe estuary.

After Albert I's death in 1260, his two heirs, John I and his younger brother Albert II ruled jointly. In 1269, 1272, and 1282, they gradually divided their governing competences within the then three territorially unconnected Saxon areas (Hadeln, Lauenburg, and Wittenberg), thus preparing a partition, whereby Albert II, Burgrave of Magdeburg since 1269, concentrated on the Wittenberg territory. He consolidated his position by marrying Agnes, daughter of Rudolph of Habsburg, whom he elected King of the Romans in 1273. After Duke John I had resigned in 1282 in favour of his three minor sons Eric I, John II and Albert III, followed by his death three years later, the three brothers and their uncle Albert II continued the joint rule as Saxon dukes.

Upon the death of Margrave Henry III of Meissen in 1288, Duke Albert II applied at his father-in-law King Rudolph I for the enfeoffment of his son and heir Rudolph with the Saxon County palatine on the Unstrut river, which ensued a long lasting dispute with the eager clan of the House of Wettin. Albert's attempts to secure the succession in the lands of the extinct Counts of Brehna were more successful: when their fiefs were reverted to the Empire in 1290, the king enfeoffed his son Rudolph. After King Rudolph had died, Albert II with his nephews still minor, wielded the Saxon electoral vote, electing Adolph of Nassau, the brother-in-law of Archbishop Siegfried II of Cologne on 27 April 1292. The bishop, together with King Wenceslaus II of Bohemia, had succeeded in bringing Albert II in favour of electing Adolph (Albert II had signed an elector pact on 29 November 1291 that he would vote the same as Wenceslaus). In 1295, Albert II would again enlarge his Saxon territory when he acquired the County of Gommern.

=== Duchy of Wittenberg ===
The last document, mentioning the joint government of Albert II with his nephews as Saxon fellow dukes dates back to 1295. The definite partitioning of the Duchy of Saxony into Saxe-Lauenburg (German: Herzogtum Sachsen-Lauenburg), jointly ruled by the brothers Albert III, Eric I and John II and Saxe-Wittenberg (German: Herzogtum Sachsen-Wittenberg), ruled by Albert II took place before 20 September 1296. The Vierlande, Sadelbande (Land of Lauenburg), the Land of Ratzeburg, the Land of Darzing (today's Amt Neuhaus), and the Land of Hadeln are mentioned as the separate territory of the brothers. Duke Albert II received the Wittenberg lands around the eponymous city, Brehna and Gommern. He thus became the founder of the Ascanian line of Saxe-Wittenberg.

When Rudolph succeeded his father Albert II as Duke of Saxe-Wittenberg in 1298, he and the Dukes of Saxe-Lauenburg rivallingly claimed the Saxon electoral privilege. Upon the assassination of his brother-in-law King Albert I in 1308, he voted for Count Henry of Luxembourg. In 1314 both duchies participated in the double election of the German kings, Frederick III, the Fair from the House of Habsburg and his Wittelsbach cousin Louis IV, the Bavarian. Louis received five of the seven votes, to wit Archbishop-Elector Baldwin of Trier, the legitimate King John of Bohemia, Duke John II of Saxe-Lauenburg, claiming the Saxon prince-electoral power, Archbishop Peter of Mainz, and Albert's Ascanian cousin Margrave Waldemar of Brandenburg. Frederick the Fair received in the same election four of the seven votes, with the deposed King Henry of Bohemia, illegitimately assuming electoral power, Archbishop Henry II of Cologne, Louis' brother Count Rudolph I of the Palatinate, and Duke Rudolph I of Saxe-Wittenberg, equally exercising the Saxon electoral dignity.

However, only Louis the Bavarian, co-elected with Saxe-Lauenburg's vote, finally asserted himself as emperor after the 1322 Battle of Mühldorf by the Treaty of Trausnitz on March 13, 1325. As an obvious opponent, Duke Rudolph I failed with his claims to Brandenburg after the line of his Ascanian cousins became extinct in 1319: King Louis IV seized the margraviate and enfeoffed his son Louis V instead. Rudolph I in turn allied with the rivaling House of Luxembourg. He supported Count Charles IV of Luxembourg as anti-king to Louis IV and on that account exclusively received the Saxon electoral dignity with the Golden Bull of 1356, thus slighting Saxe-Lauenburg. Saxe-Wittenberg thereupon came to be known as the Electorate of Saxony (Kursachsen).

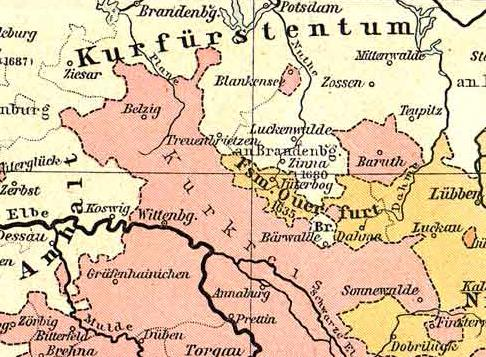
Saxon Kurkreis, after 1554

When the Ascanian line in the Electorate of Saxony died out in 1422, the Ascanian Duke Eric V of Saxe-Lauenburg failed to assert his succession in Wittenberg. King Sigismund granted the Electorate to Margrave Frederick IV of Meissen from the House of Wettin, who united the Meissen and the Saxon lands of Wittenberg under his rule. He assumed the electoral title and thereby transferred the state of Saxony up the Elbe river to his Meissen residence. His lands were also called "Upper Saxony" (see: Upper Saxon Circle) to distinguish them from the territory of the medieval stem duchy, the later Lower Saxony. The territory of former Saxe-Wittenberg became known as the Kurkreis ("Electoral District"). By the division of the Saxon Electorate according to the 1485 Treaty of Leipzig, the Wittenberg lands including the electoral dignity fell to Ernest of Wettin.
