= Ingeborg of Saxony =

Duchess consort of Saxony

Ingeborg
- Duchess consort of Saxony
- Born: c. 1253
- Died: 30 June 1302 (aged 48–49)
- Buried: Mölln, Schleswig-Holstein
- Spouse: John I, Duke of Saxony
- Issue: Helena, Countess of Holstein-Schauenburg; Elisabeth, Duchess of Schleswig; John II of Saxe-Lauenburg; Eric I of Saxe-Lauenburg; Albert III of Saxe-Lauenburg; Sophia, prioress in Plötzkau

Ingeborg (c. 1253 – 30 June 1302), was a Duchess consort of Saxony, married to John I, Duke of Saxony.

In contemporary German sources, Ingeborg is referred to as filia regis Suecie and filia Regis Sweonum ("daughter of the Swedish King"). In his 1876 commentary on the Annales Lubecenses, Claes Annerstedt speculated that she was the daughter of King Erik Eriksson. The Danish genealogist Sixten Otto Brenner made the same claim independently in 1961. Brenner noted that Ingeborg's seal featured three leopards, the symbol of the Danish royal family, which Erik had inherited from his mother. He further supported his claim by citing the papal dispensations required for Ingeborg's daughters, Helena and Elisabeth, to marry Count Günther IX of Schwarzburg-Blankenburg and Duke Valdemar of Schleswig, despite their fourth degree of affinity with their husbands.

Hans Gillingstam challenged these conclusions in 1967. He pointed out that Erik Eriksson is known to have been inherited by his sister Ingeborg Eriksdotter, which suggests that Erik's marriage was childless. Gillingstam argued that it is more likely Ingeborg was the daughter of Birger Jarl and Ingeborg Eriksdotter of Sweden. He also noted that Birger's other daughter Rikissa is referred to as filia regis Suecie in Chronica principum Saxonie, and the same papal dispensations would have been required for Ingeborg's daughters as for Erik's.

== Marriage and issue ==
Ingeborg married John I, Duke of Saxony, in 1270. She had eight children, among them the following:

- Helena (c. 1272 – 1337), married with (1) Günther IX, Count of Schwarzburg-Blankenburg (died 1289), (2) in c. 1297 Adolph VI, Count of Holstein-Schauenburg
- Elisabeth (c. 1274 – before 1306), married in 1287 with Valdemar IV, Duke of Schleswig.
- John II (c. 1275 – 22 April 1321)
- Eric I (1280/1282 – 1359/1361)
- Albert III (c. 1281 – October 1308)
- Sophia (died 13 December 1319), prioress in Plötzkau

== Primary sources ==
- Chronica principum Saxonie, MGH SS XXV, page 476
- Annales Lubicenses 1302, MGH SS XVI, page 418
