= 1273 imperial election =

1273 Holy Roman Empire royal election

- 1 October 1273

6 Prince-electors (Note: Ottokar II of Bohemia was one of the seven electors but did not attend the assembly and contested the legal validity of the election.) 4 votes needed to win
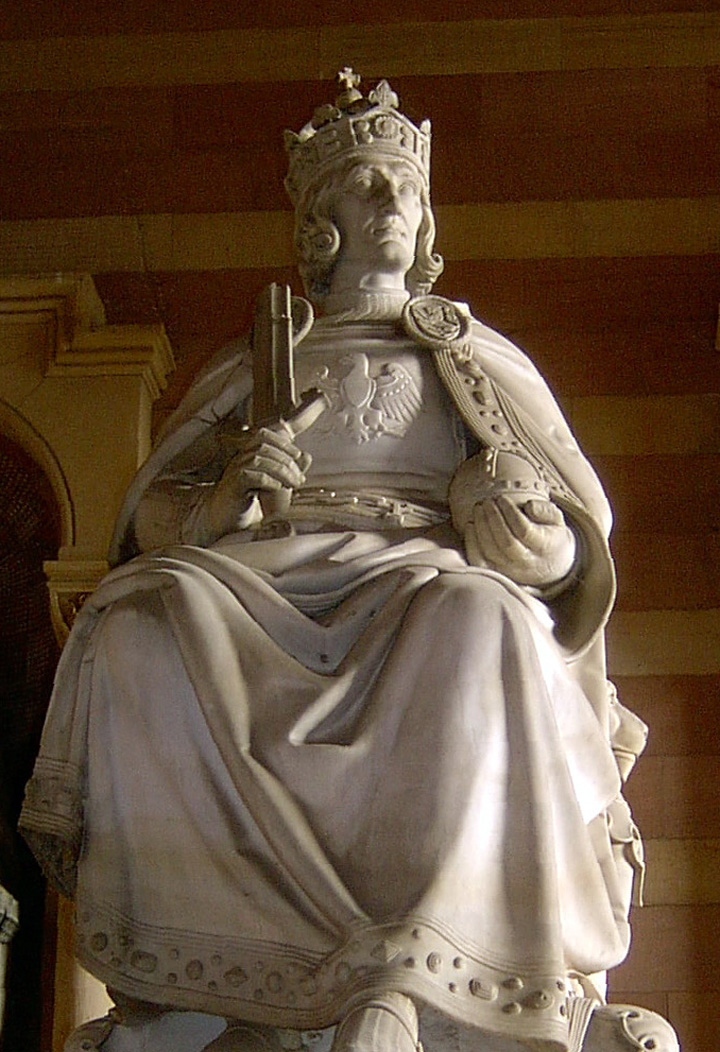

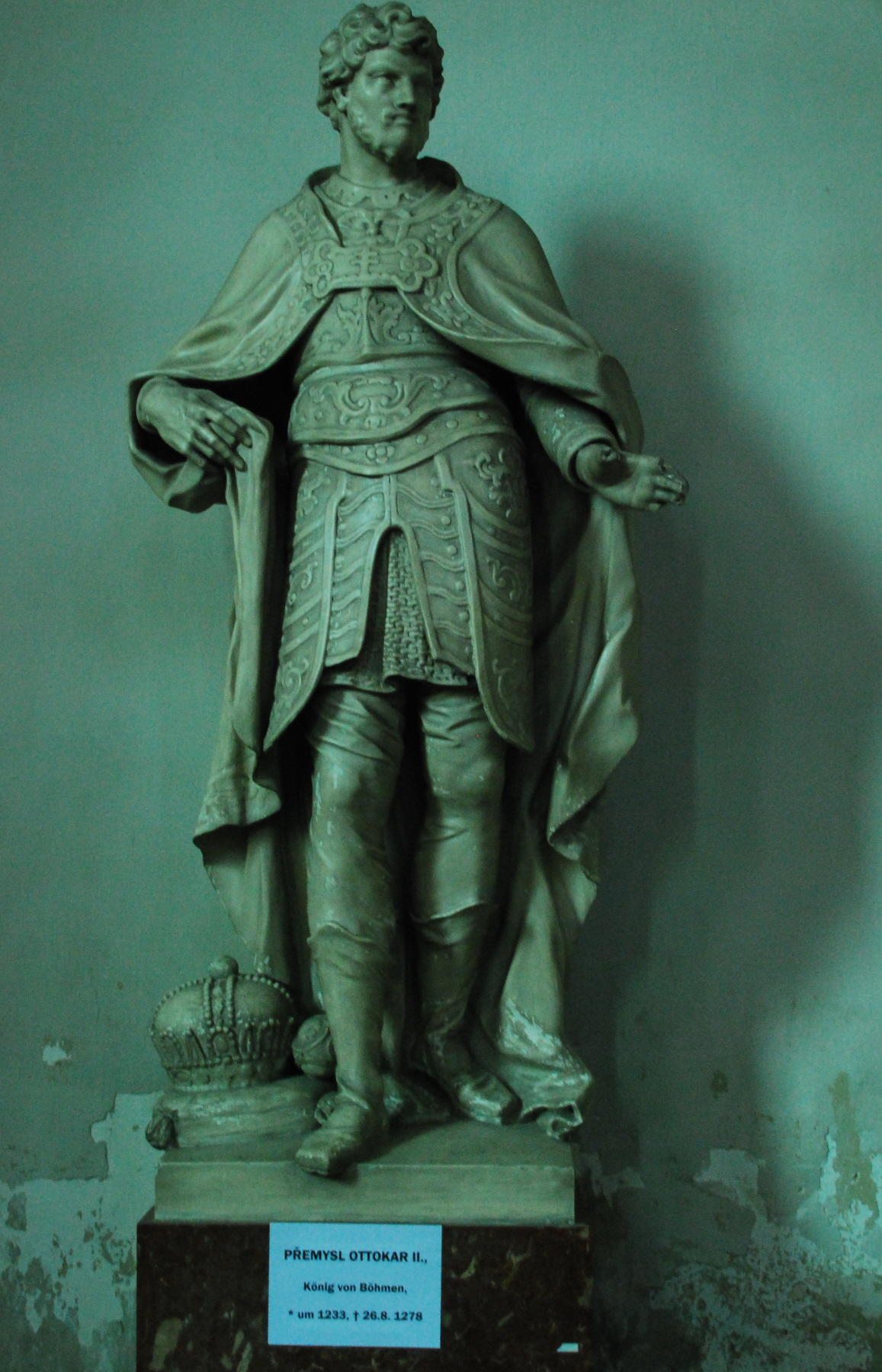
Candidate	Rudolf I	Ottokar II of Bohemia
House	Habsburg	Přemyslid
Electoral vote	6	0
Percentage	100%
King before election
Richard of Cornwall
House of Plantagenet
Elected King
Rudolf I
House of Habsburg

The imperial election of 1273 was an imperial election held to select the emperor of the Holy Roman Empire. It took place in Frankfurt on October 1.

== Background ==
The Holy Roman Empire was in the midst of a period known as the Great Interregnum. In July 1245, the Pope Innocent IV had declared the then emperor, Frederick II, Holy Roman Emperor, deposed, opening a split between two factions, the Guelphs and Ghibellines.

The previous king of the Romans, Richard, 1st Earl of Cornwall, died on April 2, 1272, in Berkhamsted following a stroke he had suffered in December 1271. The seven prince-electors called to Frankfurt were:

- Archbishop Werner von Eppstein, Elector of Mainz
- Archbishop Engelbert II von Falkenburg, Elector of Cologne
- Archbishop Heinrich II. von Finstingen, Elector of Trier
- Louis II, Elector Palatine
- John and Albert II, co-dukes of Saxony as Saxon elector
- Otto V, Margrave of Brandenburg-Salzwedel
- Ottokar II, King of Bohemia and "usurper" duke of Austria

To Frankfurt arrived the three archbishops, Elector Louis and

- Albert of Saxony also as representative of his brother
- Frederick III of Nuremberg as representative for Margraviate of Brandenburg

However, strictly speaking, Ottokar's marriage with the heiress of the Arch-Pincerna dynasty had already ended in annulment, Ottokar was holding as usurper her duchies the Carantanian territories, duchy of Styria and Austria. King Ottokar II did not arrive. The six electors convened on 29 September and summoned the Bavarian Duke to exercise the Carantanian-Bavarian vote instead of the absent King Ottokar or anyone else better entitled to it.

There were 6 candidates: the favourites Rudolf, Count of Habsburg and Ottakar II of Bohemia (an elector himself), and lesser candidates Louis II, Duke of Bavaria, Siegfried I, Prince of Anhalt and Frederick I, Margrave of Meissen. Charles I of Anjou supported his nephew Philip III of France but he did not gain support. Alfonso X of Castile (elected in 1257 alongside Richard) remained an anti-king until 1275.

== Election and aftermath ==
Count Rudolf was elected without opposition after Henry XIII, Duke of Bavaria's promotion to elector instead Ottakar II. Rudolf's principal voters, Albert II of Saxony and Louis II of Palatinate, were assured by marrying his daughters to the two electors. He was crowned at Aachen Cathedral on October 24.

Rudolf was the first member of the House of Habsburg to rule the Holy Roman Empire. The house would occupy the seat continuously from 1438 to 1740 and produce emperors and kings of Bohemia, England, Germany, Hungary, Croatia, Mexico, Ireland, Portugal and Spain, as well as rulers of several Dutch and Italian principalities.
