= Amt Neuhaus =

- Municipality
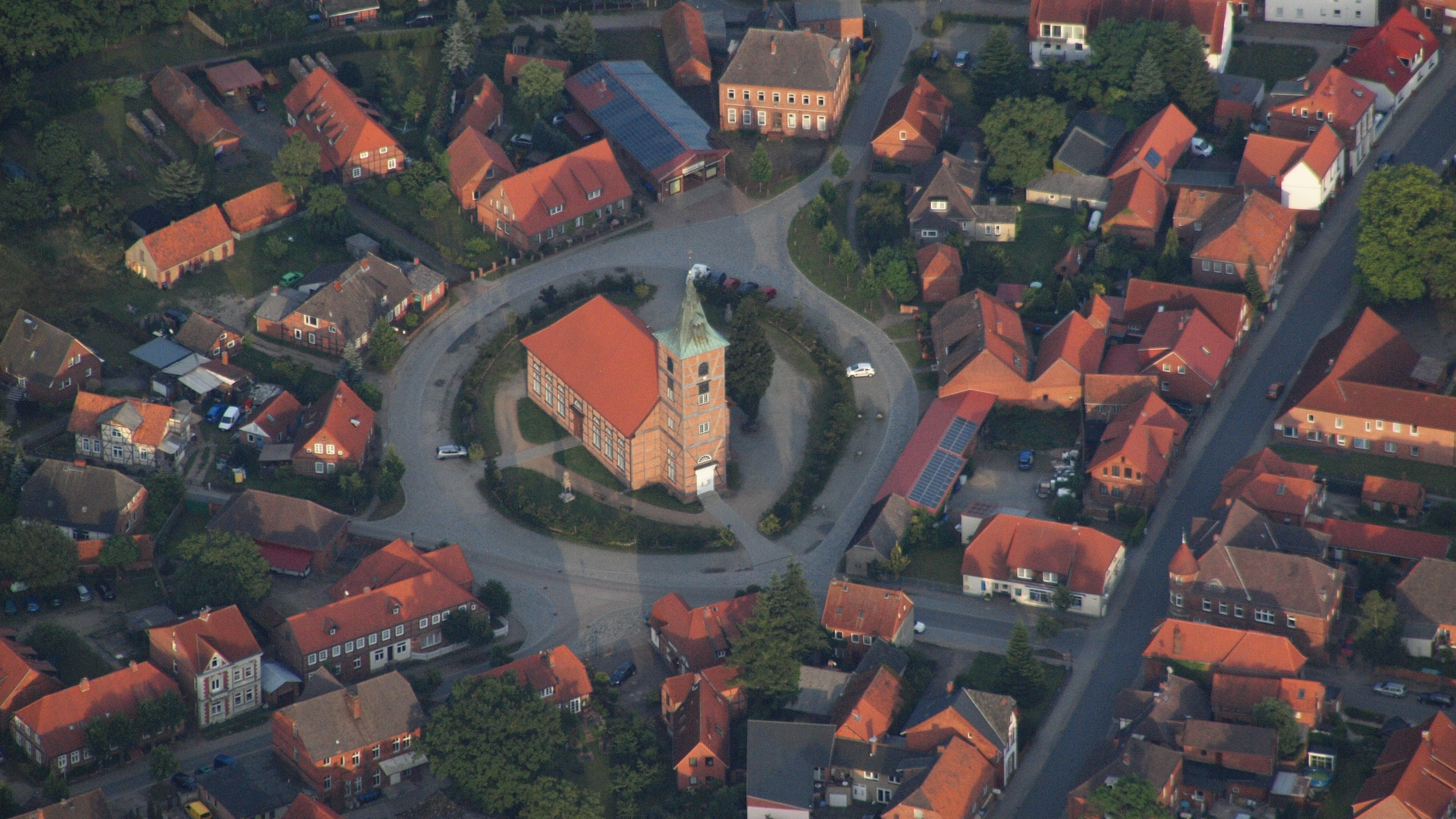
- Aerial view of the village center

- Coat of arms

- Location of Amt Neuhaus within Lüneburg district
- Interactive map of Amt Neuhaus
- Location within Germany Location within Lower Saxony
- Coordinates: 53°17′07″N 10°55′56″E
- Country: Germany
- State: Lower Saxony
- District: Lüneburg
- Subdivisions: 8 districts

Government
  - Mayor (2019–24): Andreas Gehrke (CDU)

Area
  - Total: 237.16 km^{2} (91.57 sq mi)
- Elevation: 6 m (20 ft)

Population (2025-12-31)
  - Total: 4,330
  - Density: 18.3/km^{2} (47.3/sq mi)
- Time zone: UTC+01:00 (CET)
  - Summer (DST): UTC+02:00 (CEST)
- Postal codes: 19273
- Dialling codes: 038841
- Vehicle registration: LG
- Website: www.amt-neuhaus.de

Amt Neuhaus is a municipality in the District of Lüneburg, in Lower Saxony, Germany. Amt means "municipal office" in German. The original "municipal office of Neuhaus" existed since at least the 17th century until 1885, consecutively as part of Saxe-Lauenburg (which ceased to exist in 1689), Electorate of Hanover (1689-1810), Kingdom of Hanover (1814-1866), and the Prussian Province of Hanover (1866-1885).

In 1885, Prussia dissolved the municipality of Neuhaus, while the area remained part of the Province of Hanover. However, in 1945 the area of the former municipality was annexed to Mecklenburg and thus became a part of the Soviet Occupation Zone due to lying on the right bank of the Elbe River, and thus along with the former County of Blankenburg and the municipality of Calvörde became one of a few small areas of the Province of Hanover (since 1946 Lower Saxony) that were part of East Germany from 1949 to 1990.

After German reunification in 1990, the municipalities that had once made up Neuhaus until 1885 quickly held a referendum to secede from Mecklenburg and return to Lower Saxony as a joined municipality in 1992, which out of reasons of tradition took up the old name of Amt Neuhaus, or "municipal office of Neuhaus". It is thus, together with neighbouring Wendischthun in Bleckede, the only part of former East Germany that is today part of a Land that during the Cold War belonged to West Germany.

== History ==
In the course of the eastern colonisation the area of today's Amt Neuhaus became a part of the Duchy of Saxony. The area was named as the Land of Darzing, when the co-ruling Saxon dukes Albert II and his nephews Albert III, Eric I and John II partitioned Saxony into Saxe-Lauenburg and Saxe-Wittenberg before 20 September 1296. The Land of Darzing was then a part of Saxe-Lauenburg, colloquially also called Lower Saxony.

A ducal castle, dat Nyehus (the new house) was first mentioned in 1369. The name of the castle became eponymous for Neuhaus upon Elbe, a component of today's Amt Neuhaus. It served the duchess dowager Catherine (*1488 – 29 July 1563*, Neuhaus), widow of Magnus I, as residence until her death. Around 1600 Duke Francis II restored Neuhaus Castle. In 1616 the ducal residential castle in Lauenburg upon Elbe, started in 1180–1182 by Duke Bernard I, burnt down and Duke Francis II then used Neuhaus Castle as his residence. On 23 May 1624 Francis' daughter Sophia Hedwig (Lauenburg upon Elbe, *24 May 1601 - 21 February 1660*, Glücksburg) married Philip, Duke of Schleswig-Holstein-Sonderburg-Glücksburg in Neuhaus Castle.

On his ascension in 1619 Duke Augustus, son of Francis II, moved Saxe-Lauenburg's capital from Neuhaus upon Elbe towards Ratzeburg, where it remained since. Neuhaus Castle passed into the hands of Augustus' younger brother Francis Charles (*2 May 1594 - 30 November 1660*, Neuhaus) and his wife Agnes of Brandenburg (Berlin, *27 July 1584 - 16 March 1629*, Neuhaus), daughter of Elector John George.

After George William, Duke of Brunswick-Lüneburg, had captured Saxe-Lauenburg and de facto taken the throne, inhibiting the ascension of the Duchess Anna Maria Franziska of Saxe-Lauenburg in 1689, Neuhaus Castle stood empty. It was torn down in 1698 and the bricks were used to build the Göhrde Hunting Lodge. Lüneburg-Celle and Saxe-Lauenburg passed by inheritance to the new Electorate of Hanover in 1705.

After the French victory over the electorate the Neuhaus area became part of the ephemeral Kingdom of Westphalia in early 1810, forming part of its Lower Elbe département. When after the Great French War the bulk of Saxe-Lauenburg was separated from Hanover in 1815, the Neuhaus area, however, remained with Hanover, which had been elevated to Kingdom of Hanover the year before. After the Prussian annexation of Hanover Neuhaus became a part of the new Province of Hanover in 1866. At the introduction of Prussian style district administration in Hanover on 1 April 1885 Neuhaus area became part of the Bleckede district, merged into the District of Lüneburg on 1 October 1932.

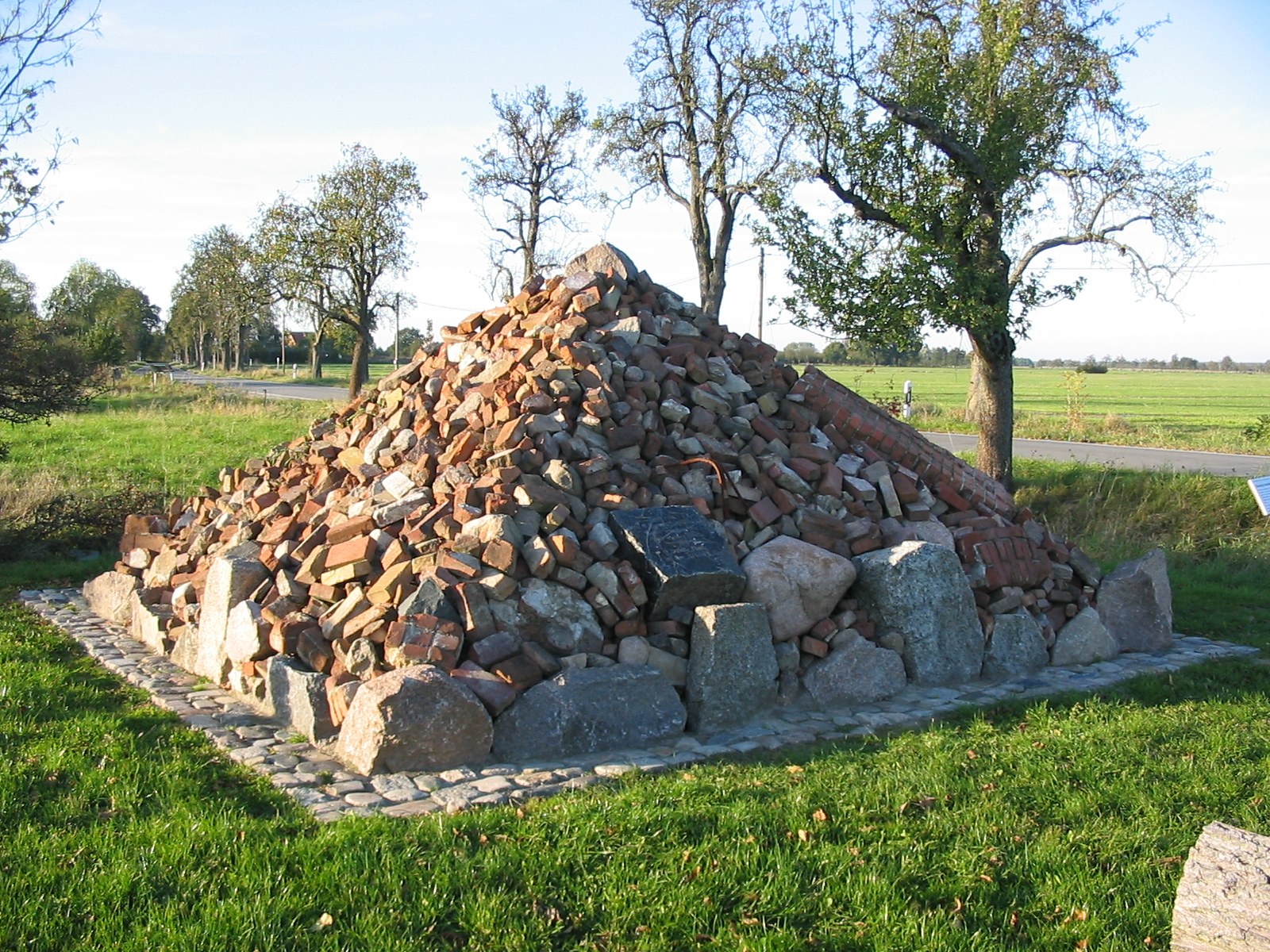
Memorial for the houses of Vockfey demolished for the East German border control zone.

With the Allied occupation of Germany the situation changed again. The initial British occupation zone in Germany had no bridge between the bulk of the Hanover province south of the Elbe, and the Amt Neuhaus area north of the Elbe, so the British ceded the Neuhaus area to the state of Mecklenburg within the Soviet zone of occupation in Germany. Along with the rest of Mecklenburg, the area became part of the eastern German Democratic Republic in 1949. The East German control zone along the inner German border, sealed off since 1952, made the West and the Elbe banks inaccessible for the inhabitants of the Neuhaus area. Families considered to be living too close to the border were evacuated and their houses demolished, including part of the village Vockfey.

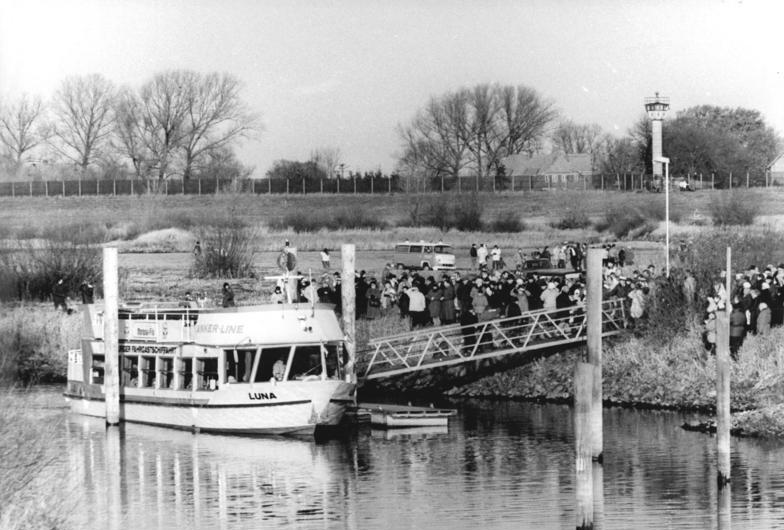
First ferry crossing the reopened border in the Elbe river on 16 November 1989 with East German border fences and watch towers in the background.

After the downfall of the communist regime in East Germany in 1989 (Die Wende) the first democratic municipal elections took place in May 1990. Today's municipality of Amt Neuhaus then still consisted of eight independent municipalities: Dellien, Haar, Kaarßen, Neuhaus upon Elbe, Stapel, Sückau, Sumte and Tripkau. These became part of the reconstituted state of Mecklenburg-Vorpommern in October 1990. On 31 March 1992, the eight municipalities formed components of a new collective municipality of Amt Neuhaus. The eight newly-elected municipal councils each decided unanimously for a reintegration into the District of Lüneburg, which since 1946 had belonged to the West German state of Lower Saxony.

In an interstate treaty, both states agreed to separate Amt Neuhaus from Mecklenburg-Vorpommern on 30 June 1993, when it was annexed to Lower Saxony. The treaty also included the historically Mecklenburgian village of Niendorf, which had belonged to Sumte since 1 January 1974, and the north-Elbian suburbs of the otherwise south-Elbian city of Bleckede, which were also reunited after their separation by the occupying British in 1945.

On 30 June the number of component municipalities of Amt Neuhaus shrank to six, before the remaining ones merged into the unitary municipality of the same name. With the Elbe bridge between Darchau and Neu Darchau a solid street connection between Amt Neuhaus and the rest of Lower Saxony is in the process being planned. In a referendum the inhabitants of Amt Neuhaus voted for a merger with the city of Bleckede on 7 June 2009. Bleckede, however, had not decided as of 2017.

== Coat of arms ==
The coat-or-arms combines the coats of arms of the Saxon and Saxe-Lauenburgian dukes of the House of Ascania, a barry of ten in sable and or with a crancelin bendwise, the Saxon horse of modern Lower Saxony (also used by the pre-1180 Duchy of Saxony) and an image of the former Neuhaus Castle.

== Villages and localities in Amt Neuhaus ==
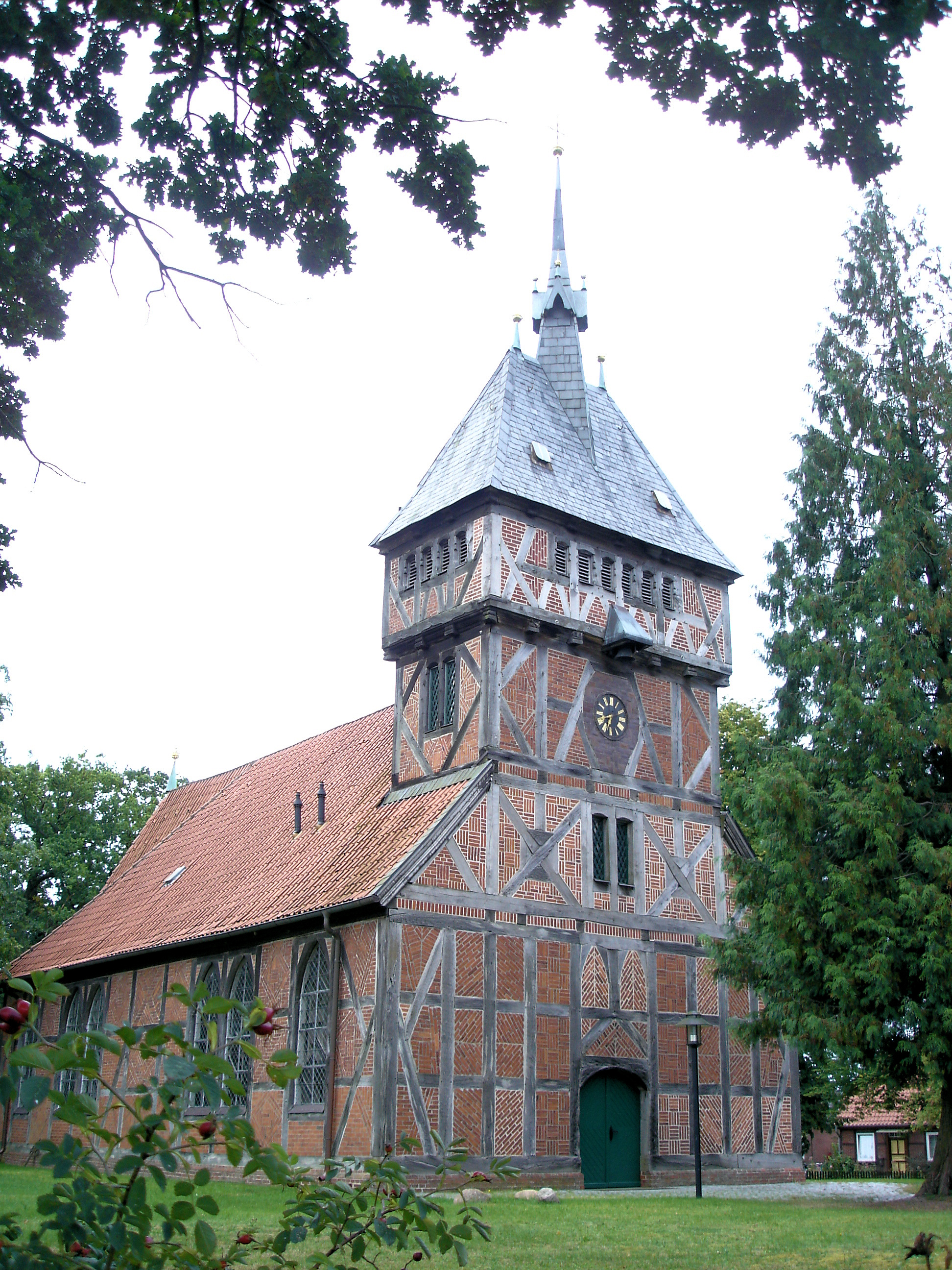
Half-timbered Lutheran Church in Tripkau.

The municipality comprises the following seven component localities: Dellien, Haar, Kaarßen, Neuhaus upon Elbe, Stapel, Sumte and Tripkau. They include the following settlements and places: Banke, Bitter, Bohnenburg, Brandstade, Darchau, Dellien, Gosewerder, Gülstorf, Gülze, Gutitz, Haar, Herrenhof, Kaarßen, Klein Banratz, Konau, Krusendorf, Laake, Laave, Neu Garge, Neuhaus, Niendorf, Pinnau, Pommau, Preten, Privelack, Raffatz, Rassau, Rosien, Stapel, Stiepelse, Stixe, Strachau, Sückau, Sumte, Tripkau, Viehle, Vockfey, Wehningen, Wilkenstorf and Zeetze.

== Language ==
Northern Low Saxon is still widely spoken in Amt Neuhaus.

== Partnership ==
- Ryn, Poland

== Sons and daughters of Amt Neuhaus ==
- Anna Maria Franziska of Saxe-Lauenburg (1672–1741), duchess and heiress of Saxe-Lauenburg
- Carl Peters (1856-1918), German politician, commentator on politics and current affairs, colonialist and explorer of Africa
- Werner Conze (1910-1986), historian
- Till Backhaus (born 1959), politician (SPD)
- Jürgen Schult (*1960), German track and field athlete and the current world record holder in the discus throw since 1986
