= Sumte, Lower Saxony, Germany =

Sumte
- Location within Lower Saxony Location within Germany
- Coordinates: 53°17′N 10°53′E
- Country: Germany
- State: Lower Saxony
- Municipality: Amt Neuhaus

Sumte (/ˈzuːmtə/, German pronunciation: [ˈzʊmtə]) is a village in the municipality of Amt Neuhaus, located 30 km east of the county town Lüneburg in the state of Lower Saxony in northern Germany. Sumte was part of the only exchange of territory between states of the former German Democratic Republic (East Germany) and West Germany. The location east of the river Elbe is unique for a community in Lower Saxony.

== Geography ==
Sumte is located in 3 km distance of the river Elbe which would flood the area several times a year without levee. The Sumte area is characterized by wet grassland and fertile fields. Furthermore, the embarkment of the Elbe river resulted in several oxbow lakes of which the Lake Sumte is the biggest. The Sumte area has historically always been a rural territory. The nearest city with more than 100 000 inhabitants is Hamburg in 65 km distance (city center).

== History ==
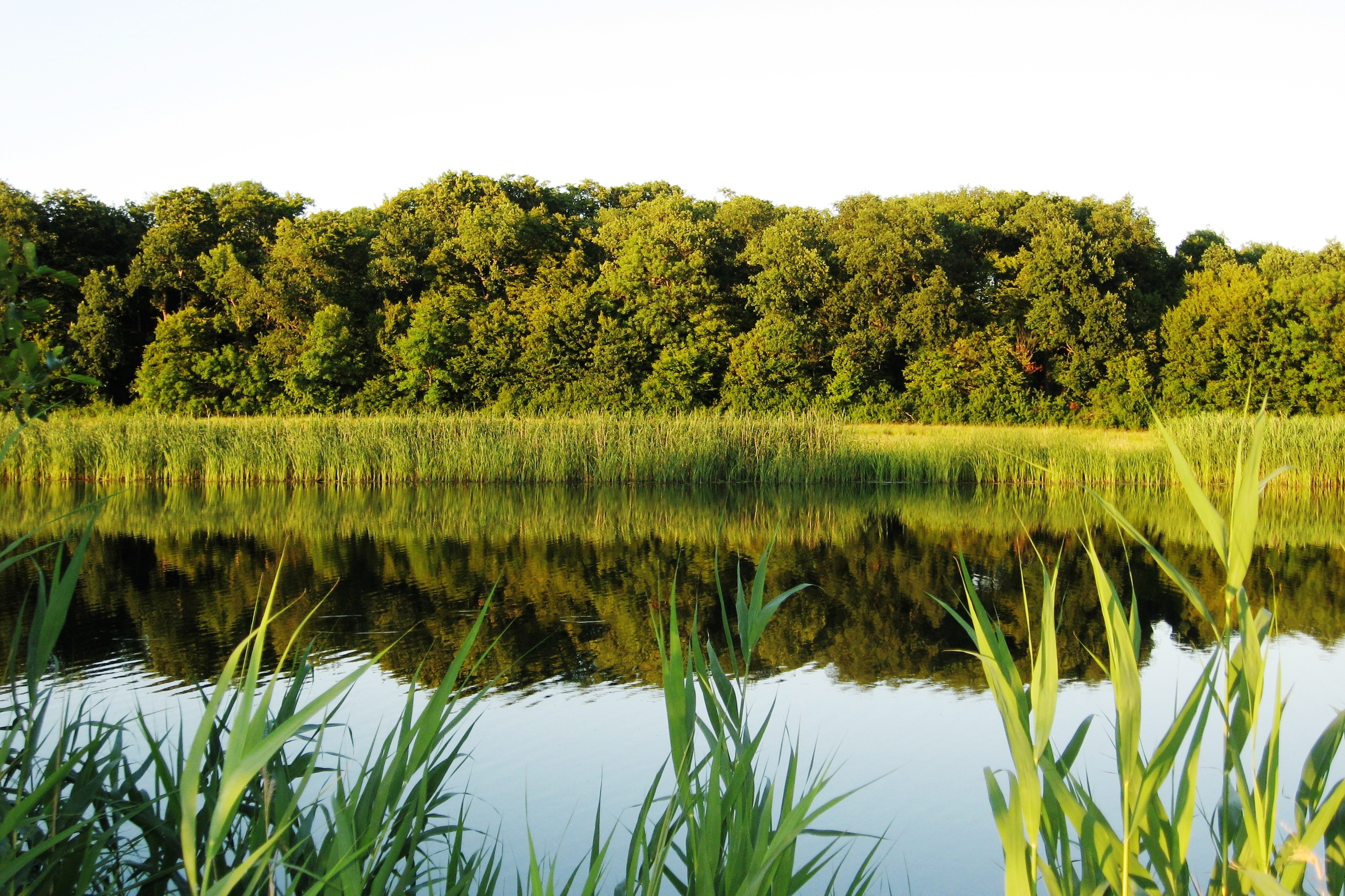
Lake Sumte an oxbow lake of the Elbe river

The first documented mentioning of Sumte dates back as early as 1352 as Zommete, which is of Slavic origin and means catfish. The name indicates a founding of the village by Slavic people as fisherman's settlement.

At times of the German eastward expansion German settlers mixed with the ancestral Slavic people and the old German village of Sumte was formed. Sumte belonged to the Kingdom of Hanover until it became Prussian province in 1871.

After world war II Sumte belonged to the British occupation zone but was resigned to the Soviets, since it was the only territory in the British zone east of the river Elbe and the upkeep costs of this bridgehead would have been too high.

Therefore, Sumte became part of the Soviet controlled German Democratic Republic.

After the German reunification in 1990, people raised their voices for a small reunifaction, which means they wanted to belong to Hannover again, which now was the state of Lower Saxony.

In 1993, the two federal states Mecklenburg Western Pomerania, which was newly formed and Lower Saxony signed a treaty to exchange the territory of Amt Neuhaus and thus Sumte belonged to Hannover again.

The proximity to Lüneburg and to the Hamburg Metropolitan Region lead to an economic recovery of the Sumte region.

In October 2015 plans became public that the government of Lower Saxony plans to set up a refugee transit camp with up to 1000 refugees. These plans made Sumte worldwide famous, since the ratio of 10 refugees versus 1 inhabitant would have been unique in a developed country. After close inspection of the local infrastructure and two townhall meetings, the maximum number of refugees was reduced to 750. On 2 November 2015 the first 100 refugees arrived in Sumte. Locals and the ASB as operator of the camp, installed a shop, a kindergarten and a medical station within the refugee camp, which can be used by inhabitants of Sumte as well.
