= Albert II of Saxony =

Duke of Saxony (c. 1250–1298)

Albert II of Saxony (Wittenberg upon Elbe, ca. 1250 – 25 August 1298, near Aken) was a son of Duke Albert I of Saxony and his third wife Helen of Brunswick and Lunenburg, a daughter of Otto the Child. He supported Rudolph I of Germany at his election as Roman king and became his son-in-law. After the death of their father Albert I in 1260 Albert II jointly ruled the Duchy of Saxony with his elder brother John I, and thereafter with the latter's sons.

== Life ==
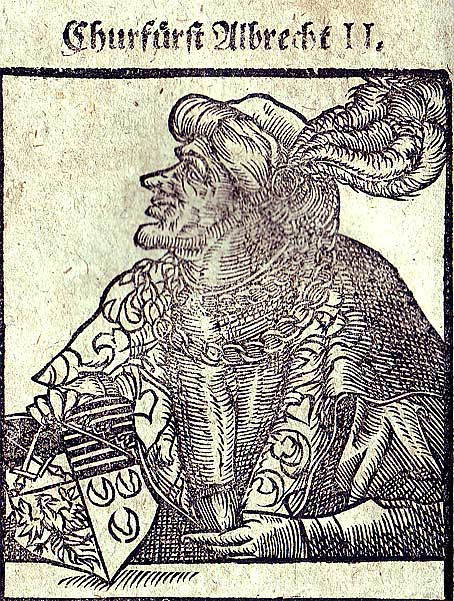
Albrecht 2 Sachsen

In 1269, 1272 and 1282 the brothers gradually divided their governing competences within the three territorially unconnected Saxon areas (one called Land of Hadeln around Otterndorf, another around Lauenburg upon Elbe and the third around Wittenberg), thus preparing a partition.

In the imperial election in 1273 Albert II represented the jointly ruling brothers. In return Rudolph I had married his daughter Agnes of Habsburg to Albert II. After John I had resigned in 1282 in favour of his three minor sons Eric I, John II and Albert III, followed by his death three years later, the three brothers and their uncle Albert II continued the joint rule in Saxony.

In 1288 Albert II applied to King Rudolph I for the enfeoffment of his son and heir Duke Rudolf I with the Electorate of Saxony, which ensued a long lasting dispute with the eager clan of the House of Wettin. When the County of Brehna was reverted to the Empire after the extinction of its comital family the king enfeoffed Duke Rudolf. In 1290 Albert II gained the County of Brehna and in 1295 the County of Gommern for Saxony. King Wenceslaus II of Bohemia succeeded in bringing Albert II in favour of electing Adolf of Nassau as new emperor: Albert II signed an elector pact on 29 November 1291 that he would vote the same as Wenceslaus. On 27 April 1292 Albert II, with his nephews still minor, wielded the Saxon electoral vote, electing Adolf of Germany.

The last document, mentioning the joint government of Albert II with his nephews as Saxon fellow dukes dates back to 1295. The definite partitioning of the Duchy of Saxony into Saxe-Lauenburg, jointly ruled by the brothers Albert III, Eric I and John II and Saxe-Wittenberg, ruled by Albert II took place before 20 September 1296, when the Vierlande, Sadelbande (Land of Lauenburg), the Land of Ratzeburg, the Land of Darzing (later Amt Neuhaus), and the Land of Hadeln are mentioned as the separate territory of the brothers. Albert II received Saxe-Wittenberg around the eponymous city and Belzig. Albert II thus became the founder of the Ascanian line of Saxe-Wittenberg.

== Marriage and issue ==
In 1282 Albert II married Agnes of Habsburg, daughter of Rudolph I of Germany. They had the following children:

- Rudolph I of Saxony, Angria and Westphalia (Wittenberg) (Wittenberg, c. 1284–12 March 1356, ibidem)
- Otto of Saxony, Angria and Westphalia (?–1349), ∞ Lucia of Dalmatia
- Albert II of Saxony, Angria and Westphalia (?–19 May 1342, Passau), Prince-Bishop of Passau
- Venceslaus of Saxony, Angria and Westphalia (?–17 March 1327, Wittenberg), canon at Halberstadt Cathedral
- Elisabeth of Saxony, Angria and Westphalia (?–3 March 1341), ∞ 1317 Obizzo III de Este-Ferrara in today's Italy
- Anna of Saxony, Angria and Westphalia (?–22 November 1327, Wismar), (1) ∞ 8 August 1308 in Meißen with Margrave Frederick the Lame (9 May 1293 – 13 January 1315), son of Frederick I of Meißen, (2) ∞ 6 July 1315 with Duke Henry II the Lion of Mecklenburg (Riga, c. 1267–21 January 1329, Doberan)

Albert II of Saxony House of Ascania Born: 1250 in Wittenberg Died: 25 August 1298 near Aken
Regnal titles
Preceded by Albert I	Duke of Saxony; 1260–1296 with John I (1260–1282); Albert III (1282–1296); Eric I (1282–1296); John II (1282–1296)	Partition of Saxony
New title Partition of Saxony	Duke of Saxe-Wittenberg; 1296–1298	Succeeded by Rudolf I
