= Albert II of Saxe-Wittenberg =

Roman Catholic bishop

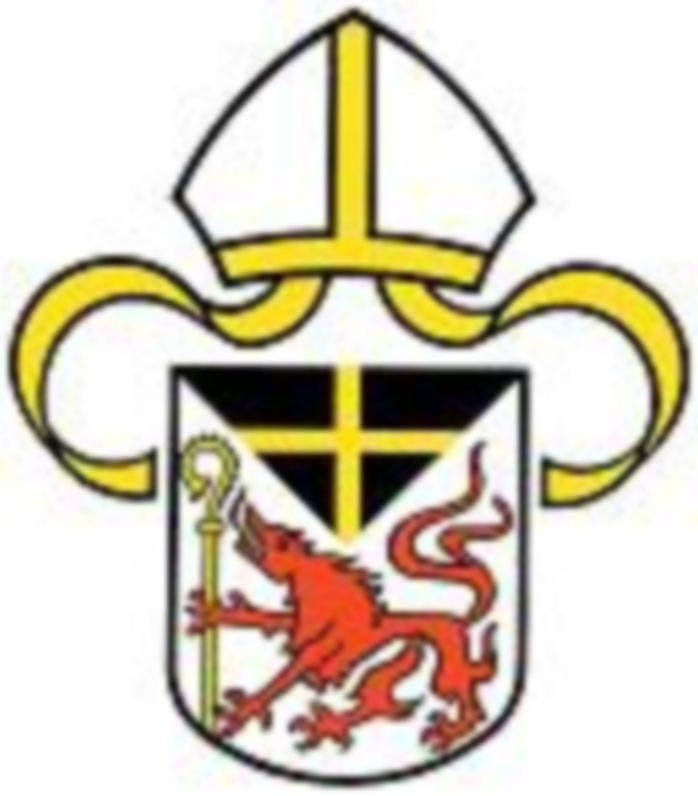
Bistumswappen of Passau.

Albert II of Saxony-Wittenberg (* around 1285, - 19 May 1342 in Passau) was from 1320 to 1342 Bishop of Passau.

== Life ==
Albert was the third son of Elector Albrecht II of Saxony and the Agnes of Habsburg, a daughter of King Rudolf von Habsburg. For a spiritual career, he was canon of Mainz and minister of St. Stephen's Cathedral, Vienna. Pope John XXII made Albert the Bishop of Passau in 1320. In the battle for the throne between Ludwig the Bavarian and Frederick the Beautiful, he stood on the side of his Habsburg cousin Friedrick, whom he also supported in 1322 in the Battle of Mühldorf. In Passau he rebuilt the Neumarkt, destroyed in 1298, and city hall, which had been forfeited to the Bishop after the rebellion against Bernhard of Prambach, was sold back to the citizens of Passau.

He is buried in Passau Cathedral.
