= Adolph VI of Holstein-Schauenburg =

Adolph VI, Count of Holstein-Schauenburg
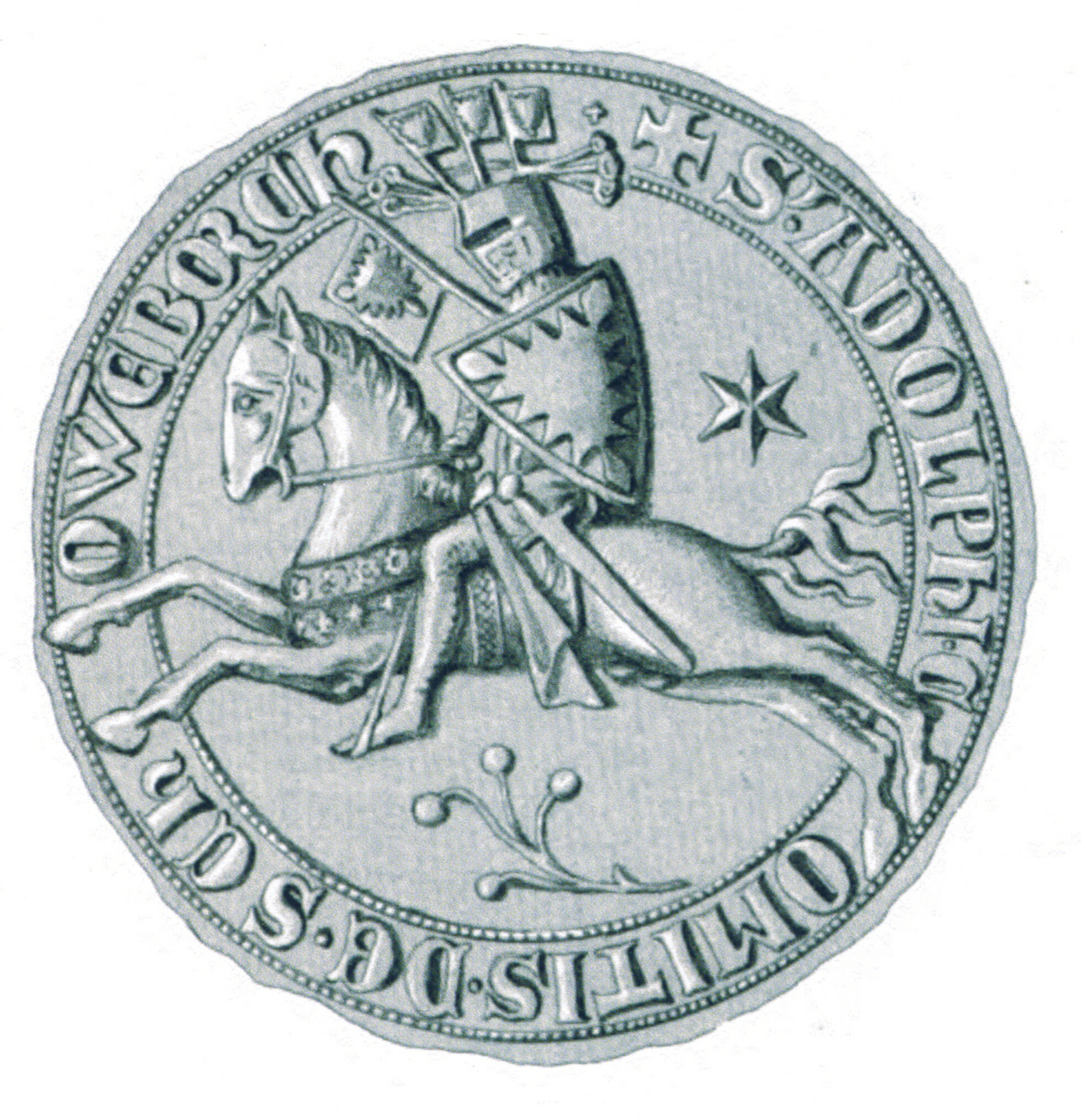
- Seal of Adolph VI
- Born: 1256
- Died: 1315 (aged 58–59)
- Noble family: House of Schauenburg
- Spouse: Helen of Saxe-Lauenburg
- Issue: Adolph VII of Holstein-Schauenburg
- Father: Gerhard I, Count of Holstein-Itzehoe
- Mother: Elisabeth of Mecklenburg

Adolph VI, Count of Holstein-Schauenburg (1256–1315) was the ruling Count of Holstein-Pinneberg and Schaumburg from 1290 until his death. He was the third son of Gerhard I and Elisabeth of Mecklenburg and was married to Helen of Saxe-Lauenburg, daughter of John I, Duke of Saxony.

== Reign ==
When Gerhard I died in 1290, his sons divided the inheritance. Adolph VI received Holstein-Pinneberg and the ancestral County of Schaumburg. Adolph is considered the founder of the younger Schauenburg line; his brothers founded the Holstein-Plön and Holstein-Rendsburg lines.

In 1298, he granted a charter to the city of Gehrden. In 1302, he began construction of the water castle at Bückeburg to defend the main trade route. The castle was named after a castle in the Obernkirchen area; the name was first mentioned in a document in 1304.

== Seal ==
His seal (see picture) reads: S(IGILLUM)*ADOLPHI*COMITIS*SCHOWE(N)BORCH "Seal of Adolph, Count of Schauenburg"

== Footnotes ==
Adolphus of Schauenburg, aka Adolphus VI the Elder House of Schauenburg Born: 1256 Died: 1315
Preceded by Gerhard I	Count of Holstein-Pinneberg and Schauenburg; 1290-1315	Succeeded by Adolph VII
