= Albert III of Saxe-Lauenburg =

Albert III (1281–1308) was a member of the House of Ascania who ruled as one of the dukes of Saxony from 1282 until his death in 1308.

== Childhood ==
Albert was a son of John I, Duke of Saxony and Ingeborg Birgersdotter of Småland. Albert III's father, John I, resigned as duke in 1282 in favour of his three sons Albert III, Eric I, and John II. As they were all minors, their uncle Albert II acted as their regent. When Albert III and his brothers came of age they shared the government of the duchy. The last document, mentioning the brothers and their uncle Albert II as Saxon fellow dukes dates back to 1295.

The definite partitioning of Saxony into Saxe-Lauenburg, jointly ruled by Albert III and his brothers and Saxe-Wittenberg, ruled by their uncle Albert II, took place by 20 September 1296, at which time the Vierlande, Sadelbande (Land of Lauenburg), the Land of Ratzeburg, the Land of Darzing (later Amt Neuhaus), and the Land of Hadeln are mentioned as the separate territories of the brothers. Albert II received Saxe-Wittenberg around the eponymous city and Belzig.

== Personal rule ==
Albert III and his brothers at first jointly ruled Saxe-Lauenburg, before they partitioned it into three parts, while the exclave Land of Hadeln remained a jointly ruled territory. Albert III then held Saxe-Ratzeburg until his death in 1308. His brother Eric I inherited part of Albert's lands, while Albert's widow, Margaret of Brandenburg-Salzwedel, retained the remainder. After her death, Eric I gained these lands as well.

However, his other brother. John II, then claimed a part for himself. So in 1321 Eric passed Bergedorf (including Vierlande) on to John II, whose lands became known as Saxe-Bergedorf-Mölln while Eric's became known as Saxe-Ratzeburg-Lauenburg.

== Marriage and issue ==
In 1302 Albert III married Margaret of Brandenburg. They did not have any children.

Albert (Albrecht) III, Duke of Saxony, Angria and Westphalia House of Ascania Born: 1281 Died: 1308
Regnal titles
Preceded by John I Albert II	Duke of Saxony; 1282–1296 with Eric I (1282–1296); John II (1282–1296); Albert II (1260–1296)	Partition of territory
New title Partition of territory	Duke of Saxe-Lauenburg; 1296–1303 with Eric I (1296–1303); John II (1296–1303)	Partition of territory
New title Partition of territory	Duke of Saxe-Ratzeburg; 1303–1308	Succeeded by Eric I
