= John II of Saxe-Lauenburg =

John II
- Born: c. 1275
- Died: 22 April 1322
- Consort: Elizabeth of Holstein-Rendsburg
- Issue Detail: Albert IV
- House of: Ascania (by birth)
- Father: John I, Duke of Saxony
- Mother: Ingeborg Birgersdotter

John II of Saxe-Lauenburg (c. 1275 – 22 April 1322) was the eldest son of John I of Saxony and Ingeborg (c. 1253–30 June 1302, Mölln), a daughter or grandchild of Birger Jarl. He ruled the Saxony jointly with his uncle Albert II and his brothers Albert III and Eric I, first fostered by Albert II until coming of age. In 1296, John II, his brothers, and their uncle divided Saxony into Saxe-Wittenberg, ruled by Albert II, and Saxe-Lauenburg, jointly ruled by the brothers between 1296 and 1303 and thereafter partitioned among them. John II then ruled the branch duchy of Saxe-Mölln, later extended to become Saxe-Bergedorf-Mölln. He participated as the Saxon prince-elector in the 20 October 1314 imperial election.

== Life ==
John was of weak health and had gone blind in young years; therefore, he was considered inferior among his brothers. John II's father John I resigned from dukedom in 1282 in favour of his three minor sons Albert III, Eric I, and John II. However, their uncle Albert II fostered them. When John II and his brothers came of age, they joined their uncle as co-rulers of Saxony. The last document mentioning the brothers and their uncle Albert II as Saxon fellow dukes dates back to 1295.

The definite partitioning of Saxony into Saxe-Lauenburg, jointly ruled by John II and his brothers, and Saxe-Wittenberg, ruled by their uncle Albert II, took place before 20 September 1296, when the Vierlande, Sadelbande (Land of Lauenburg), the Land of Ratzeburg, the Land of Darzing (later Amt Neuhaus), and the Land of Hadeln are mentioned as the separate territory of the brothers. Albert II received Saxe-Wittenberg around the eponymous city and Belzig.

John II and his brothers at first jointly ruled Saxe-Lauenburg, before they partitioned it into three parts, while the exclave Land of Hadeln remained a trilateral condominium. John II then held Mölln, parts of the Sachsenwald (Saxon Wood) and the Land of Ratzeburg west of the river Stecknitz. In 1321 he further gained Bergedorf (Vierlande)—with its castle—from his brother Eric I, who had earlier inherited the share of the Albert III already deceased in 1308. John II's branch duchy thus became known as Saxe-Bergedorf-Mölln.

Being the eldest brother, John II successfully officiated as Saxon prince-elector, a privilege disputed between the duchies of Saxe-Lauenburg and Saxe-Wittenberg. In 1314, John II participated in the election of the German king and the antiking, the Wittelsbachian Louis IV the Bavarian, and his Habsburg cousin Frederick III, the Fair.

Louis received five of the seven votes, to wit that of Duke John II, claiming the Saxon prince-electoral power, Archbishop-Elector Baldwin of Trier, the legitimate King-Elector John of Bohemia, Archbishop-Elector Peter of Mainz, and Prince-Elector Waldemar of Brandenburg.

Frederick the Fair received in the same election four of the seven votes, with the deposed King-Elector Henry of Bohemia illegitimately assuming electoral power, Archbishop-Elector Henry II of Cologne, Louis's brother Prince-Elector Rudolph I of the Electorate of the Palatinate, and Duke Rudolph I of Saxe-Wittenberg, John's cousin and rival in claiming the Saxon prince-electoral power. However, Louis prevailed as German king.

== Marriage and issue ==
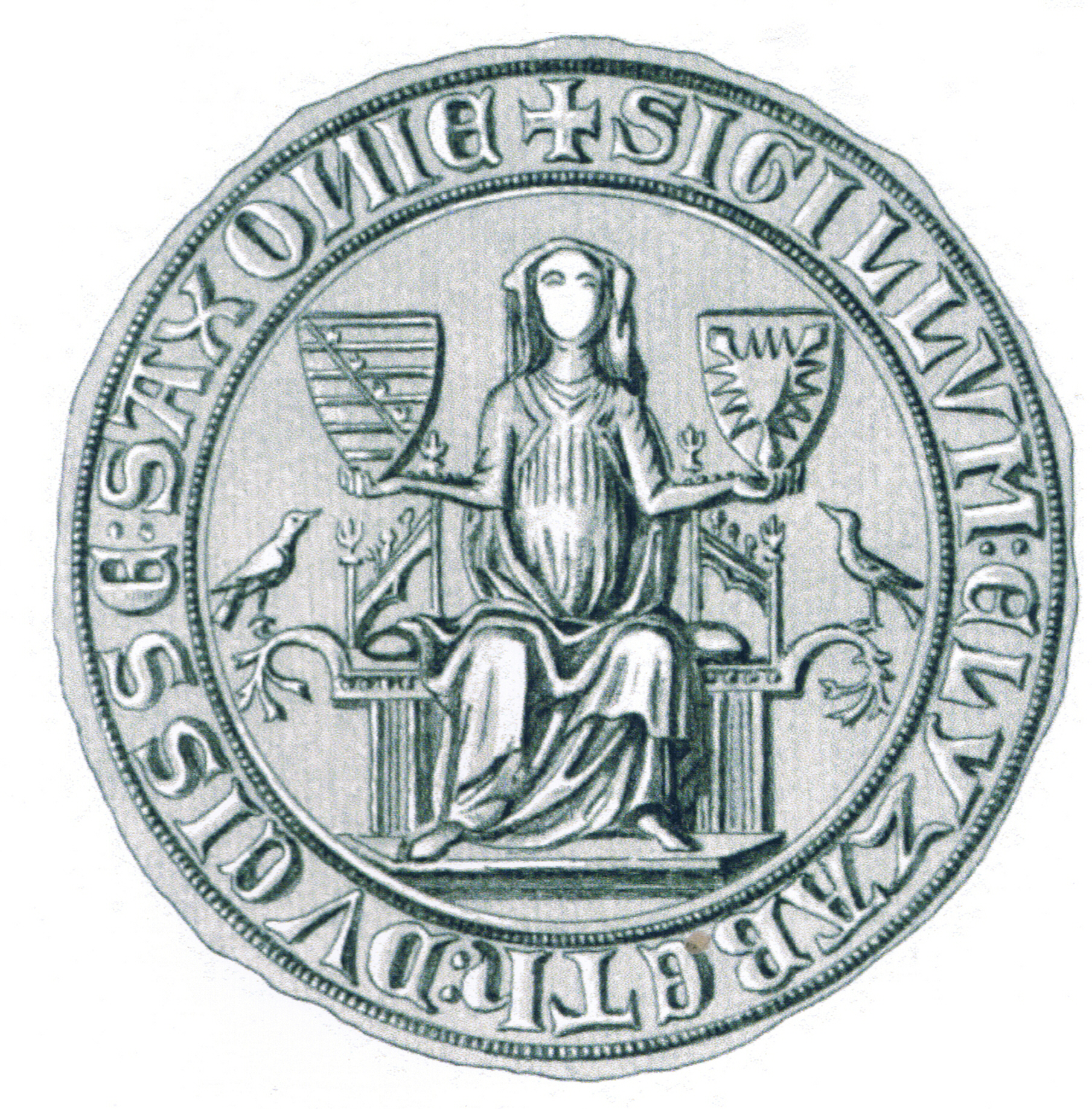
Seal of Elizabeth of Holstein-Rendsburg, ca. 1318

Ca. 1315 John II married Elizabeth of Holstein-Rendsburg (*ca. 1300–1340*), sister of Count Gerard III the Great. John and Elizabeth had the following son:

- Albert IV, Duke of Saxe-Lauenburg (*1315–1343/1344*).

== Notes ==
John II, Duke of Saxony, Angria and Westphalia; Prince-Elector of Saxony (1296–1322, rivalling with Rudolph I of Saxe-Wittenberg) House of Ascania Born: ca. 1275 Died: 22 April 1322
Regnal titles
Preceded by John I Albert II	Duke of Saxony; 1282–1296 with Albert III (1282–1296); Eric I (1282–1296); Albert II (1260–1296)	Partition of territory
New title Partition of territory	Duke of Saxe-Lauenburg; 1296–1303 with Albert III (1296–1303); Eric I (1296–1303)	Partition of territory
New title Partition of territory	Duke of Saxe-Mölln; 1303–1322	Succeeded by Albert IV
