= Eric I of Saxe-Lauenburg =

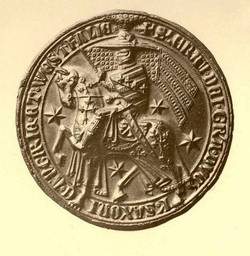
Seal of Eric I

Eric I of Saxe-Lauenburg (c.1280–1360) was a member of the House of Ascania who ruled as one of the dukes of Saxony from 1282 until 1338.

== Early life ==
Eric was a son of John I, Duke of Saxony, and Ingeborg (*ca. 1253–30 June 1302*, Mölln), a daughter or grandchild of Birger Jarl, the regent of Sweden. Eric's father John I resigned from the ducal throne in 1282 in favour of his sons: Eric I, Albert III, and John II. As they were minors, their uncle Albert II fostered them. Eric and his brothers came to age and joined the government. The last document, mentioning the brothers and their uncle Albert II as Saxon fellow dukes dates back to 1295.

== Personal rule ==
The definite partitioning of Saxony into Saxe-Lauenburg, jointly ruled by Eric I and his brothers and Saxe-Wittenberg, ruled by their uncle Albert II, took place before 20 September 1296, when the Vierlande, Sadelbande (Land of Lauenburg), the Land of Ratzeburg, the Land of Darzing (later Amt Neuhaus), and the Land of Hadeln are mentioned as the separate territory of the brothers. Albert II received Saxe-Wittenberg around the eponymous city and Belzig.

Eric I and his brothers at first jointly ruled Saxe-Lauenburg, before they partitioned it into three parts, while the exclave Land of Hadeln remained a trilateral condominium. Eric then held Bergedorf (Vierlande) and Lauenburg and inherited the share of his childless brother Albert III, Saxe-Ratzeburg, after he already deceased in 1308 and a retained section from Albert's widow Margaret of Brandenburg-Salzwedel on her death. However, his other brother then claimed a part for him, so in 1321 Eric passed Bergedorf (Vierlande) on to John II, whose share thus became known since as Saxe-Bergedorf-Mölln and Eric's as Saxe-Ratzeburg-Lauenburg.

In 1338, Eric I resigned in favour of his son Eric II. In the course of a feud between Eric II and the neighbouring Duke William of Brunswick and Lunenburg (Celle) the latter's troops expelled Eric I from his castle Riepenburg in Kirchwerder (today's Borough of Bergedorf, Hamburg) and he perished in exile at his granddaughter Jutta in Hoya's capital Nienburg upon Weser.

== Marriage and issue ==
In 1316 or 1318 Eric married Elisabeth of Pomerania (*1291–after 16 October 1349*), daughter of Bogislaw IV, Duke of Pomerania. They had the following four children:

- Eric II (*1318/1320-1368*).
- John I (*?–1372*), Prince-Bishop of Cammin 1344–1372
- Helene (*?–after 1354*), married John II, Count of Hoya-Bruchhausen (*?–1377*); their children were: Eric I, Count of Hoya, John I of Hoya and Otto IV of Hoya
- Jutta (*?–after 1354*), married Gerard III of Hoya-Nienburg (*?–1383*)

== Notes ==
Eric I, Duke of Saxony, Angria and Westphalia House of Ascania Born: ca. 1280 Died: 1360 in Nienburg upon Weser
Regnal titles
Preceded by John I Albert II	Duke of Saxony; 1282–1296 with Albert III (1282–1296); John II (1282–1296); Albert II (1260–1296)	Partition of territory
New title Partition of territory	Duke of Saxe-Lauenburg; 1296–1303 with Albert III (1296–1303); John II (1296–1303)	Partition of territory
New title Partition of territory	Duke of Saxe-Bergedorf; 1303–1321	Succeeded by John II
Preceded by Albert III	Duke of Saxe-Ratzeburg; 1308–1338	Succeeded by Eric II
