= John I, Duke of Saxony =

Duke of Saxony from 1260 until 1282

John I (1249 – 30 July 1285) ruled as duke of Saxony from 1260 until 1282.

John was the elder son of Duke Albert I of Saxony and his third wife Helen, a daughter of Otto the Child. John and his younger brother Albert II jointly ruled the Duchy of Saxony after the death of their father Albert I in 1260. In 1269, 1272, and 1282 the brothers gradually divided their land within the three territorially unconnected Saxon areas (one called Land of Hadeln around Otterndorf, another around Lauenburg upon Elbe and the third around Wittenberg), thus preparing a partition. As part of this arrangement John I became Burgrave of Magdeburg in 1269. In the imperial election in 1273, Albert II represented the jointly ruling brothers.

In 1270, John married Ingeborg (c. 1253–30 June 1302), possibly a daughter of Birger Jarl or King Erik Eriksson of Sweden. They had eight children, among them the following:

- Helena (c. 1272–1337), married firstly to Count Günther IX of Schwarzburg-Blankenburg (*?–1289*), secondly to Adolph VI, Count of Holstein-Schauenburg
- Elisabeth (c. 1274– before 1306), married to Valdemar IV, Duke of Schleswig
- John II (c. 1275–22 April 1321)
- Eric I (1280/1282–1359/1361)
- Albert III (c. 1281–October 1308)
- Sophia (died on 13 December 1319), prioress in Plötzkau

John I resigned in 1282 in favour of his three minor sons Eric I, John II and Albert III. Later John I entered the Franciscan monastery in Wittenberg, becoming its warden (guardian), which position he held until he died. John I's sons and their uncle Albert II continued the joint rule in Saxony. John died in Wittenberg.

== Notes ==
John I, Duke of Saxony House of Ascania Born: 1249 Died: 30 July 1285 in Wittenberg
Regnal titles
Preceded by Albert I	Duke of Saxony; 1260–1282 with Albert II	Succeeded by Albert II; Eric I John II; Albert III
