= Duchy of Saxony =

Medieval German state

Duchy of Saxony (and the Palatinate of Saxony)
- 804–1296
- Left: Arms of Ascanians (from around 1000), who ruled the Duchy of Saxony last; Right: Coat of arms of the Palatinate of Saxony (instituted in the southern part of the duchy)

- Attributed arms of the Duchy of Saxony The Saxon Steed (Note: The horse as a heraldic charge associated with Saxony first appears in the late 14th century as an "old Saxon" motif. The horse motif was adopted by the House of Welf in 1361 and also been used in several provinces in Westphalia. Historian James Lloyd suggests that "the Saxon Steed motif was invented in the 14th century ... as a faux-ancient symbol for the Saxons".)

- Saxony around 1000 CE, within the German Kingdom
- Status: Stem duchy; of the Carolingian Empire (843–911); of East Francia (911–962); State of the Holy Roman Empire (from 962)
- Capital: None (ducal); Allstedt (seat of the Palatinate)
- Official languages: Latin
- Common languages: Old Saxon; Middle Low German
- Religion: Roman Catholic (official); Germanic paganism
- Historical era: Middle Ages
  - Conquest of Charlemagne: 804
  - Welf ascendancy: 1137
  - Expanded by conquest: 1142
  - Welfs deposed, Ascanians enfeoffed with severely belittled duchy: 1180
  - John I and Albert II co-rulers: 1260
  - Competences divided: 1269, 1272 and 1282
  - Definite partition into Saxe-Lauenburg and Saxe-Wittenberg: 1296
  - Wittenberg Ascanian line extinct; reunification failed: 1422
Preceded by
Old Saxony
Succeeded by
Saxe-Wittenberg
Saxe-Lauenburg
Westphalia
Oldenburg
Anhalt
Blankenburg
Bremen
Münster
Hildesheim
Tecklenburg
Holstein
Hoya
Magdeburg
Verden
Lübeck
Minden
Lippe
Brunswick-Lüneburg
Ratzeburg
- Today part of: Germany

The Duchy of Saxony (German: Herzogtum Sachsen; Low German: Hartogdom Sassen) was a medieval duchy that encompassed Old Saxony, a historical region settled by the Saxons since the Migration Period. Initially independent, it came under the sphere of influence of the neighboring Frankish rulers as early as the Merovingian era. It was later subdued by Charlemagne during the Saxon Wars (772–804), and incorporated into the Carolingian Empire. From the Treaty of Verdun (843) onwards, it belonged to the East Frankish Kingdom, and thus became one of the five stem duchies of the emerging German realm. Saxon duke Henry the Fowler was elected German king in 919, thus founding the Saxon dynasty that ruled Germany and the Holy Roman Empire up to 1024.

From the middle of the 10th century, the Duchy was administered and then ruled by the House of Billung, and later by the House of Welf. Dukes of Saxony were also counted among the prince-electors. Upon the deposition of duke Henry the Lion in 1180, the ducal title, together with the electoral rights, fell to the House of Ascania. In time, many territories were split from the ducal jurisdiction, such as the Principality of Anhalt in 1218 and the Duchy of Brunswick-Lüneburg in 1235. In 1296, the remaining lands were divided between the Ascanian ducal branches of Saxe-Lauenburg and Saxe-Wittenberg. Their mutual dispute over the right of wielding the electoral office was resolved by the Golden Bull of 1356, granting the title of Electors of Saxony to dukes of Saxe-Wittenberg. Upon the extinction of that ducal line in 1422, the remaining Ascanian line of Saxe-Lauenburg claimed both the Saxe-Wittenberg ducal possessions and the electoral dignity. Those requests were denied by the emperor Sigismund, who granted the possessions and titles in question to the House of Wettin. Since that time, the Wettin aglomeration of lands in the middle Elbe regions (Saxe-Wittenberg, March of Meissen, Osterland and others) led to the emergence of Upper Saxony, centered on the Wettin Electorate of Saxony, while core territories of the former stem duchy in the old Saxony came to be known as Lower Saxony.

== Geography ==
The Saxon stem duchy covered the greater part of present-day Northern Germany, including the modern German states (Länder) of Lower Saxony and Saxony-Anhalt up to the Elbe and Saale rivers in the east, the city-states of Bremen and Hamburg, the Westphalian part of North Rhine-Westphalia, and the Holstein region (Nordalbingia) of Schleswig-Holstein. In the late 12th century, Duke Henry the Lion also occupied the adjacent area of Mecklenburg (the former Billung March).

The Saxons were one of the most robust groups in the late tribal culture of the times, and eventually bequeathed their tribe's name to a variety of more and more modern geopolitical territories, such as Old Saxony (Altsachsen), Upper Saxony, the Electorate, the Prussian Province of Saxony (in present-day Saxony-Anhalt), and the Kingdom of Saxony, the latter corresponding with the German Free State of Saxony, which bears the name today, despite its territory not having been part of the medieval duchy (see map on the right).

== History ==
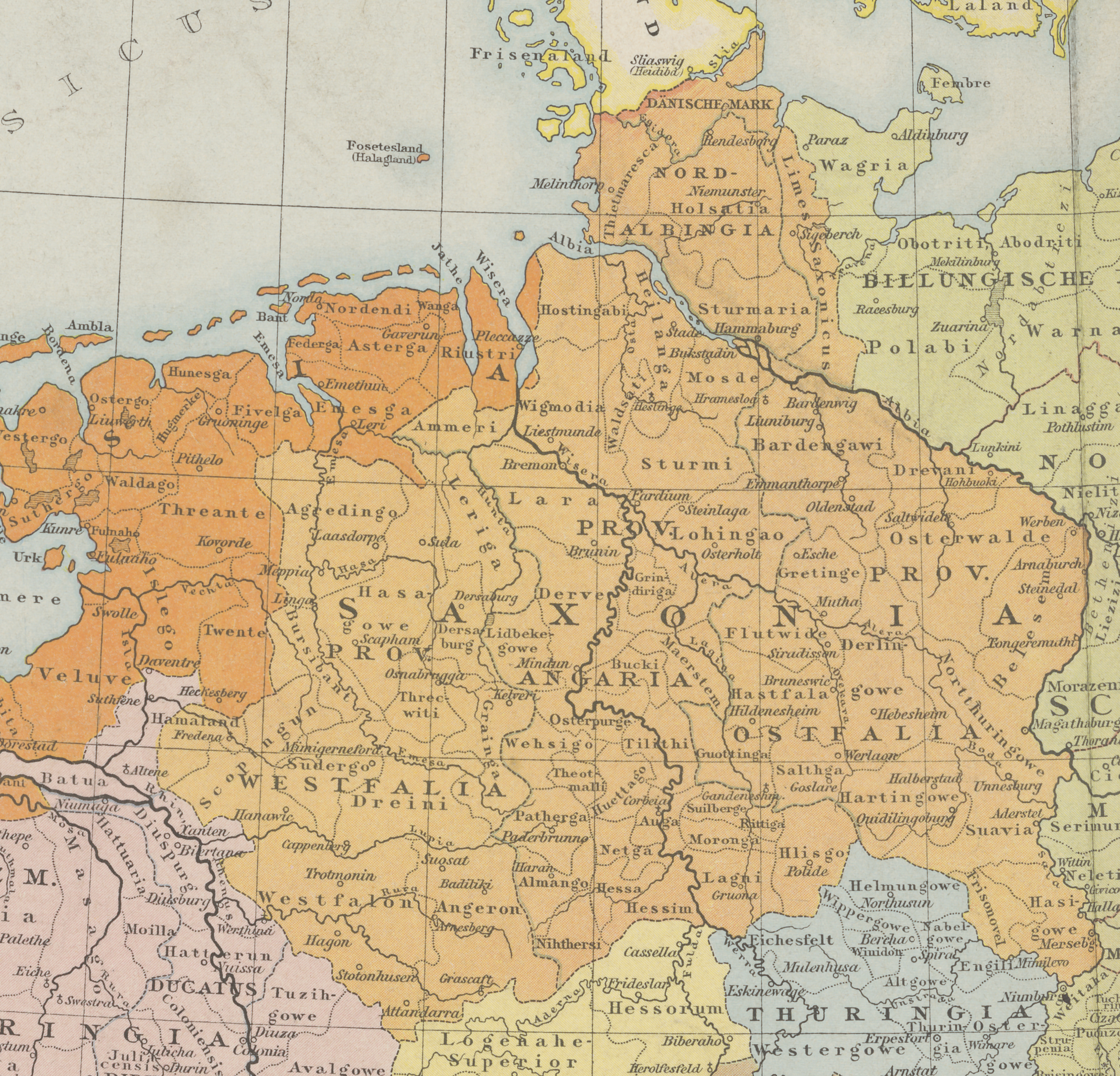
The Duchy of Saxony in 1000

=== Older stem duchy ===
According to the Res gestae saxonicae by tenth century chronicler Widukind of Corvey, the Saxons had arrived from Britannia at the coast of Land Hadeln in the Elbe-Weser Triangle, called by the Merovingian rulers of Francia to support the conquest of the Thuringian kingdom, a mirror of the English origin myth where Saxon tribes from the region, under the leadership of legendary brothers Hengist and Horsa, were invited to post-Roman Britannia (see Anglo-Saxon settlement of Britain) by Vortigern.

The Royal Frankish Annals mention a 743 Frankish campaign led by the Carolingian Mayor of the Palace Carloman against the Saxons, followed by a second expedition together with his brother Pepin the Short the next year. In 747 their rebellious brother Grifo allied with Saxon tribes and temporarily conquered the stem duchy of Bavaria. Pepin, Frankish king from 750, again invaded Saxony and subdued several Westphalian tribes until 758.

In 772, Pepin's son Charlemagne started the final conquest of the Saxon lands. Though his ongoing campaigns were successful, he had to deal with the fragmentation of the Saxon territories in Westphalian, Eastphalian, Angrian, and Nordalbingian tribes, demanding the conclusion of specific peace agreements with single tribes, which soon were to be broken by other clans. The Saxons devastated the Frankish stronghold at Eresburg; their leader (Herzog) Widukind refused to appear at the 777 diet at Paderborn, retired to Nordalbingia and afterwards led several uprisings against the occupants, avenged by Charlemagne at the Massacre of Verden in 782. Widukind allegedly had to pledge allegiance in 785, having himself baptised and becoming a Frankish count. Saxon uprisings continued until 804, when the whole stem duchy had been incorporated into the Carolingian Empire.

Afterwards, Saxony was ruled by Carolingian officials, e.g. Wala of Corbie (d. 836), a grandson of Charles Martel and cousin of the emperor, who in 811 fixed the Treaty of Heiligen with King Hemming of Denmark, defining the northern border of the Empire along the Eider River. Among the installed dukes were already nobles of Saxon descent, like Wala's successor Count Ekbert, husband of Saint Ida of Herzfeld, a close relative of Charlemagne.

=== Younger stem duchy ===
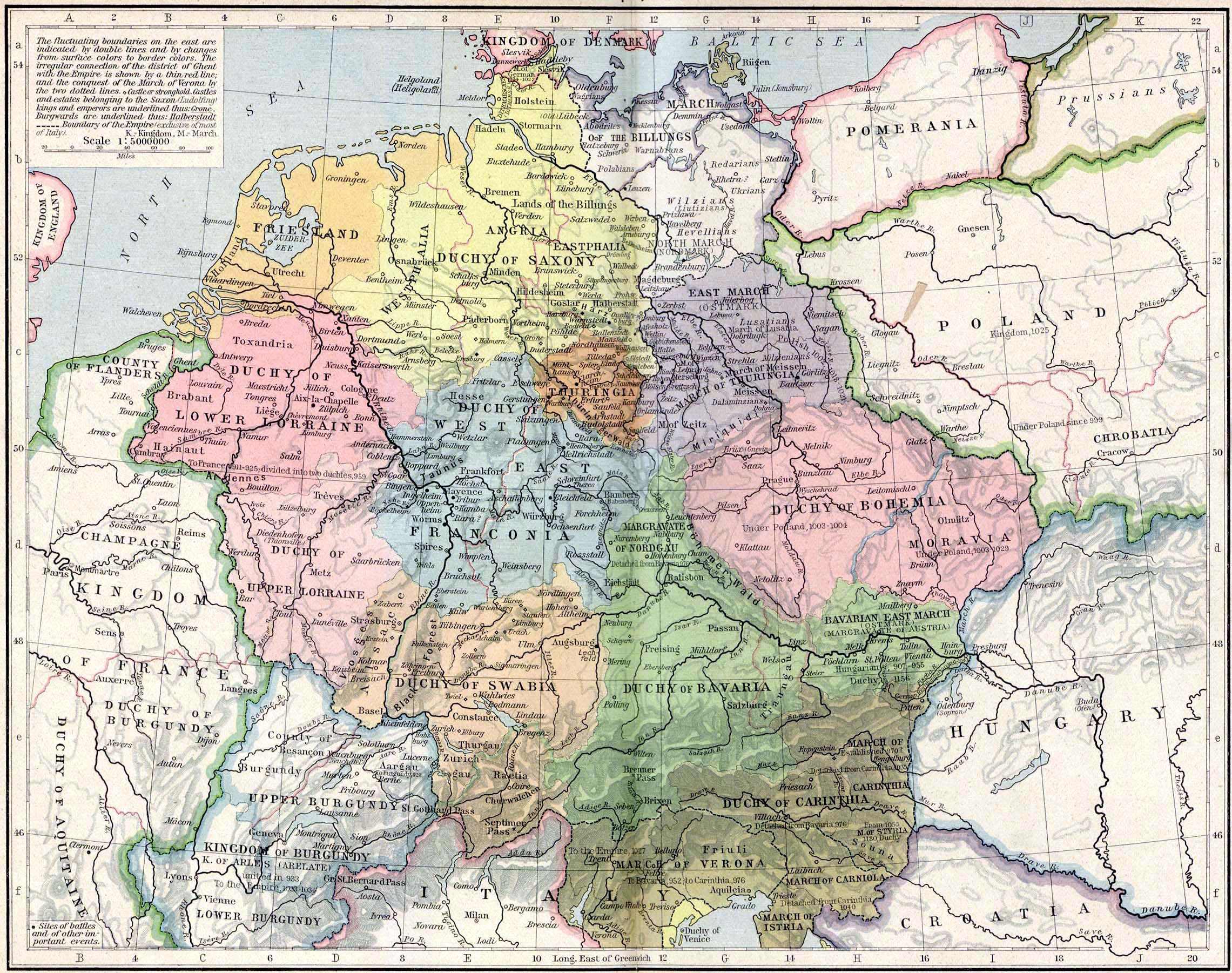
Stem duchies of the German kingdom 919–1125, by William R. Shepherd: Saxony in yellow, Franconia in blue, Bavaria in green, Swabia in light orange, Lower Lotharingia in dark pink, Upper Lotharingia in light pink, Thuringia in dark orange and Frisia in light orange

Ida of Herzfeld may have been an ancestor of the Saxon count Liudolf (d. 866), who married Oda of Billung and ruled over a large territory along the Leine river in Eastphalia, where he and Bishop Altfrid of Hildesheim founded Gandersheim Abbey in 852. Liudolf became the progenitor of the Saxon ducal, royal and imperial Ottonian dynasty; nevertheless his descendance, especially his affiliation with late Duke Widukind, has not been conclusively established.

In 865, under the Division of Frankfurt, king Louis the German granted Saxony, together with (Franconia) to his son Louis the Younger, who succeeded his father as king in those regions (876), and ruled there until his death in 882, being married to Liutgard of Saxony, daughter of count Liudolf.

Subdued only a few decades earlier, the Saxons rose to one of the leading tribes in East Francia; it is however uncertain if the Ottonians already held the ducal title in the ninth century. Liudolf's elder son Bruno (Brun), progenitor of the Brunswick cadet branch of the Brunonen, was killed in a battle with invading Vikings under Godfrid in 880. He was succeeded by his younger brother Otto the Illustrious (d. 912), mentioned as dux in the contemporary annals of Hersfeld Abbey, which, however, seems to have been denied by the Frankish rulers. His position was strong enough to wed Hedwiga of the Babenberg, daughter of mighty Duke Henry of Franconia, princeps militiae of King Charles the Fat. As all of Hedwiga's brothers were killed in the Franconian Babenberg feud with the rivalling Conradines, Otto was able to adopt the strong position of his father-in-law and to evolve the united Saxon duchy under his rule.

In 911, the East Frankish Carolingian dynasty went extinct with the death of King Louis the Child, whereafter the dukes of Saxony, Swabia and Bavaria met at Forchheim to elect the Conradine duke Conrad I of Franconia king. One year later, Otto's son Henry the Fowler succeeded his father as Duke of Saxony. According to the medieval chronicler Widukind of Corvey, King Conrad designated Henry his heir, thereby denying the succession of his own brother Eberhard of Franconia, and in 919 the Saxon duke was elected King of East Francia by the assembled Saxon and Franconian princes at Fritzlar.

Henry was able to integrate the Saxon, Swabian, Bavarian and Lotharingian duchies into a united realm, vital to handle the continuous attacks by Hungarian forces. In 928/929, Henry's Saxon forces invaded regions across the Elbe river and subdued various tribes of the Polabian Slavs. Those campaigns led to the establishment of German strongholds in Brandenburg and Meissen, as well as the surrender of Duke Wenceslaus of Bohemia, thus marking the beginning of the German eastward expansion (Ostsiedlung). Slavic tribes on the borders of Eastphalia, such as Drevani, who lived along Elbe river in the region later known as Altmark, were gradually subdued and integrated, thus expanding Saxon frontiers towards east.

In 936, upon Henry's death at Memleben, his son Otto I succeeded him. According to Widukind, he was crowned king at Aachen Cathedral, with the other German Dukes Gilbert of Lorraine, Eberhard of Franconia, Arnulf of Bavaria and Herman of Swabia paying homage to him. He appointed a prominent Saxon count Hermann Billung as the royal governor of Saxony, and princeps militiae or "markgraf", with orders to subdue the Slavic Lutici beyond the Elbe River (Billung March). In time, Hermann gained further influence, and before his death he was in all but name the duke of Saxony.

Sometime after 965, Otto I entrusted the defense of northeastern Saxon regions in Eastphalia, later known as Altmark (meaning: the old march) to count Thiadricus (Dietrich of Haldensleben), placing him and Saxon governor Hermann Billung in charge over the pacification of neighboring Slavic tribes, such as Redarians and Hevellians.

=== House of Billung ===
- 973: Hermann Billung dies in Quedlinburg and shortly after Otto I dies in Memleben. Otto II becomes emperor and he make Hermann's son Bernhard I the first duke of Saxony of the Billung House.
- 983: Danish uprising in Hedeby. Slavic uprising in Northalbingia.
- 1011: Duke Bernhard I Billung dies; his son Bernhard II becomes duke.
- 1042: Ordulf Billung, son of Bernhard II, marries Wulfhild, the half-sister of King Magnus of Denmark and Norway. Danes and Saxons fight against the Wends.
- 1059: Ordulf Billung becomes duke after the death of his father.
- 1072: Magnus Billung becomes duke.
- 1106: Duke Magnus dies without heir, ending the Billung dynasty. The Billung territory becomes part of the Welf and Ascanian countries. Lothar of Supplinburg becomes duke of Saxony.
- 1112: Otto of Ballenstedt created duke by Emperor Henry V.
- 1115: Victory of Lothar of Supplinburg in the battle of Welfesholz over King Henry V.
- 1125: Lothar of Supplinburg elected as German king and crowned emperor.
- 1137 Death of Lothar. The Welf Henry the Proud, duke of Bavaria since 1126, had been appointed Lothar's successor (who died without a male heir) as duke of Saxony. However, as he was not officially invested and it would make him far too powerful, his claim is not recognized by his rivals.
- 1138: Henry loses the election for king of the Germans against Conrad of Hohenstaufen. Insisting to hold both duchies, Bavaria and Saxonia, a claim Conrad opposes, Henry refuses an oath of allegiance and is consequently stripped of all his titles. The Duchy of Saxony is granted to the Ascanian Albert the Bear.
- 1139: Due to his marriage to Lothar's only daughter Gertrude of Supplingenburg, Henry still holds substantial lands within the Duchy of Saxony. Henry fiercely resists Albert's attempts to take possession of Saxony. Preparing an attack on the Duchy of Bavaria, Henry dies unexpectedly.
- 1141: Albert the Bear renounces the Duchy of Saxony and the title (as well as the Duchy of Bavaria) is granted to Henry X's adolescent son Henry the Lion.

=== Henry the Lion ===
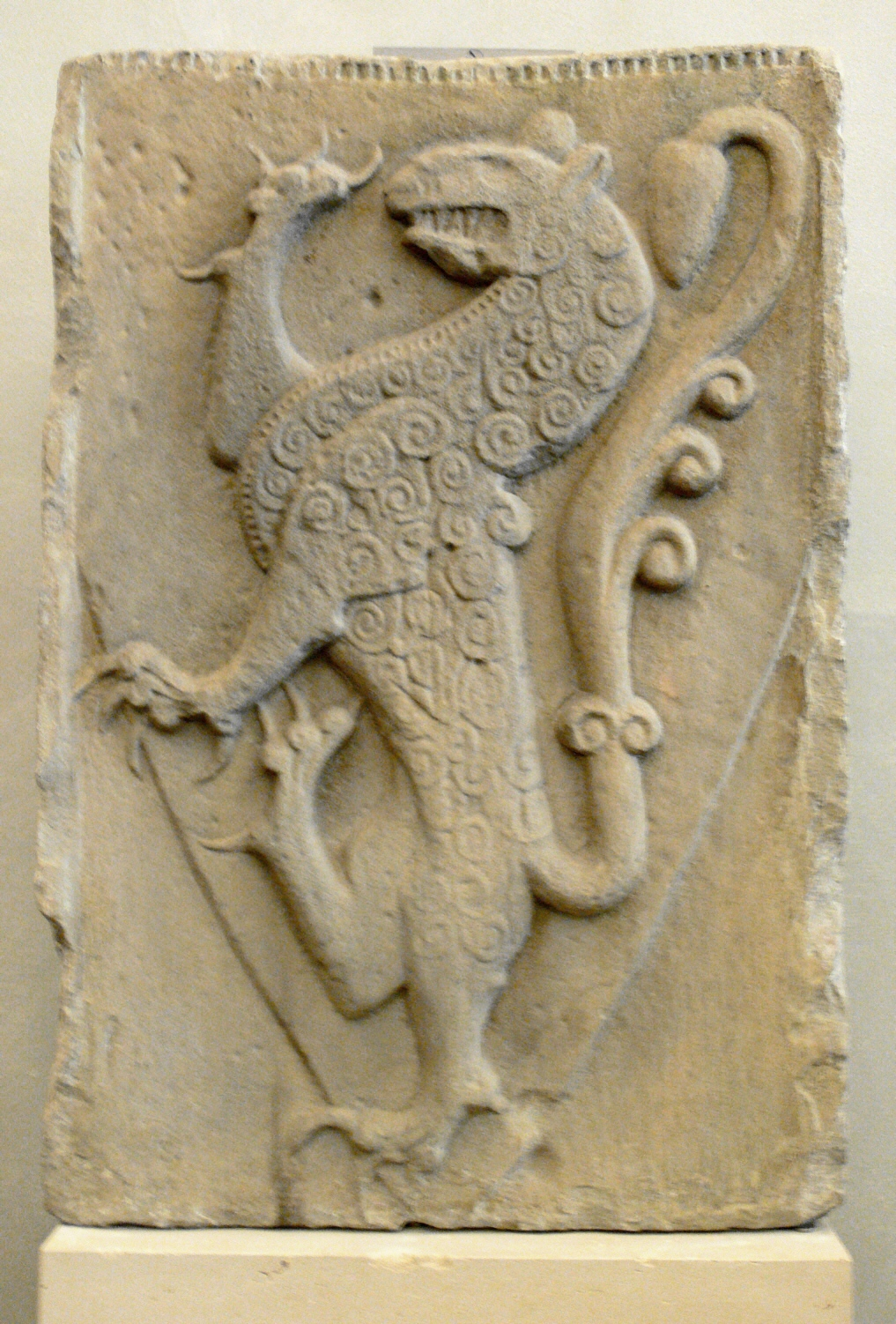
Coat of arms of the House of Welf

In 1142, King Conrad III of Germany granted the ducal title to the Welf scion Henry the Lion (as Duke Henry III). Henry gradually extended his rule over northeastern Germany, leading crusades against the pagan Wends. During his reign, Henry massively supported to the development of the cities in his dominion, such as Brunswick, Lüneburg and Lübeck, a policy ultimately contributing to the movement of the House of Welf from its homelands in southern Germany to the north.

In 1152, Henry supported his cousin Frederick III of Swabia, to be elected King of Germany (as Frederick I Barbarossa), likely under the promise of granting the Duchy of Bavaria back to Henry. Henry's dominion now covered a significant amount of Germany, from the Alps to the North Sea and the Baltic Sea, making him one of the mightiest rulers in central Europe, and thus also a potential threat for other German princes and even Barbarossa.

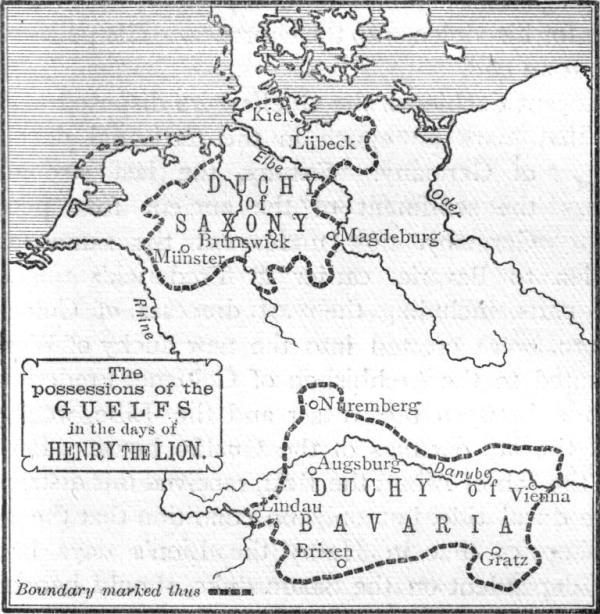
Welf possessions in the 12th century, showing the duchies of Saxony and Bavaria

To expand his rule, Henry continued to claim titles of lesser families, who left no legitimate heir. This policy caused unrest among many Saxon nobles and other German princes, first and foremost his father's old enemy, Albrecht the Bear. During Barbarossa's fourth Italian campaign in 1166, a league of German Nobles declared war on Henry. The war continued until 1170, despite several attempts of the Emperor to mediate. Ultimately, Henry's position remained unchallenged, due to Barbarossa's favourable rule.

In 1168, Henry married Matilda Plantagenêt, the daughter of Henry II of England and Eleanor of Aquitaine and sister of Richard Lionheart.

The following years led to an estrangement between Barbarossa and Henry. Henry ceased to support the Emperor's Italy campaigns, which were all proven unsuccessful, as massively as he used to, and instead focused on his own possessions. In 1175 Barbarossa again asked for support against the Lombard League, which Henry is said to have refused bluntly, even though Barbarossa kneeled before him. Records of this event were not written until several years later, and sources are contradictory, depending on whom the author favoured. Nevertheless, lacking the support of the Saxons the following Battle of Legnano was a complete failure for the Emperor.

When the majority of the realm's princes had returned from Italy, Henry's refusal was instantly exploited to weaken his position. Views differ, whether Barbarossa initiated Henry's downfall or if it was orchestrated by the princes first and foremost.

Between 1175 and 1181, Henry was charged with several accusations, such as violating the honour of the realm (honor imperii), breach of the peace, and treason. If he were to follow the summons to the Hoftag, Henry would've acknowledge the charges as rightful, and therefore refused all summons. In 1181, he was ultimately stripped of his titles. Unwilling to give up without a fight, Henry already had dealt the first blow in 1180 against the city of Goslar, which he had coveted for several years already. During the following war, Henry's domestic policy and the treatment of his vassals proved fatal, and his power quickly crumbled. In 1182, Henry the Lion ultimately went into exile, joining the court of his father-in-law, Henry II of England. Following the death of his wife and also of the Emperor, the latter while participating in the Third Crusade, Henry returned to Brunswick in 1189 and briefly tried to regain the lost lands. After several setbacks, Henry made peace with Barbarossa's son and heir, King Henry VI, Holy Roman Emperor.

=== Ascanian Duchy of Saxony ===
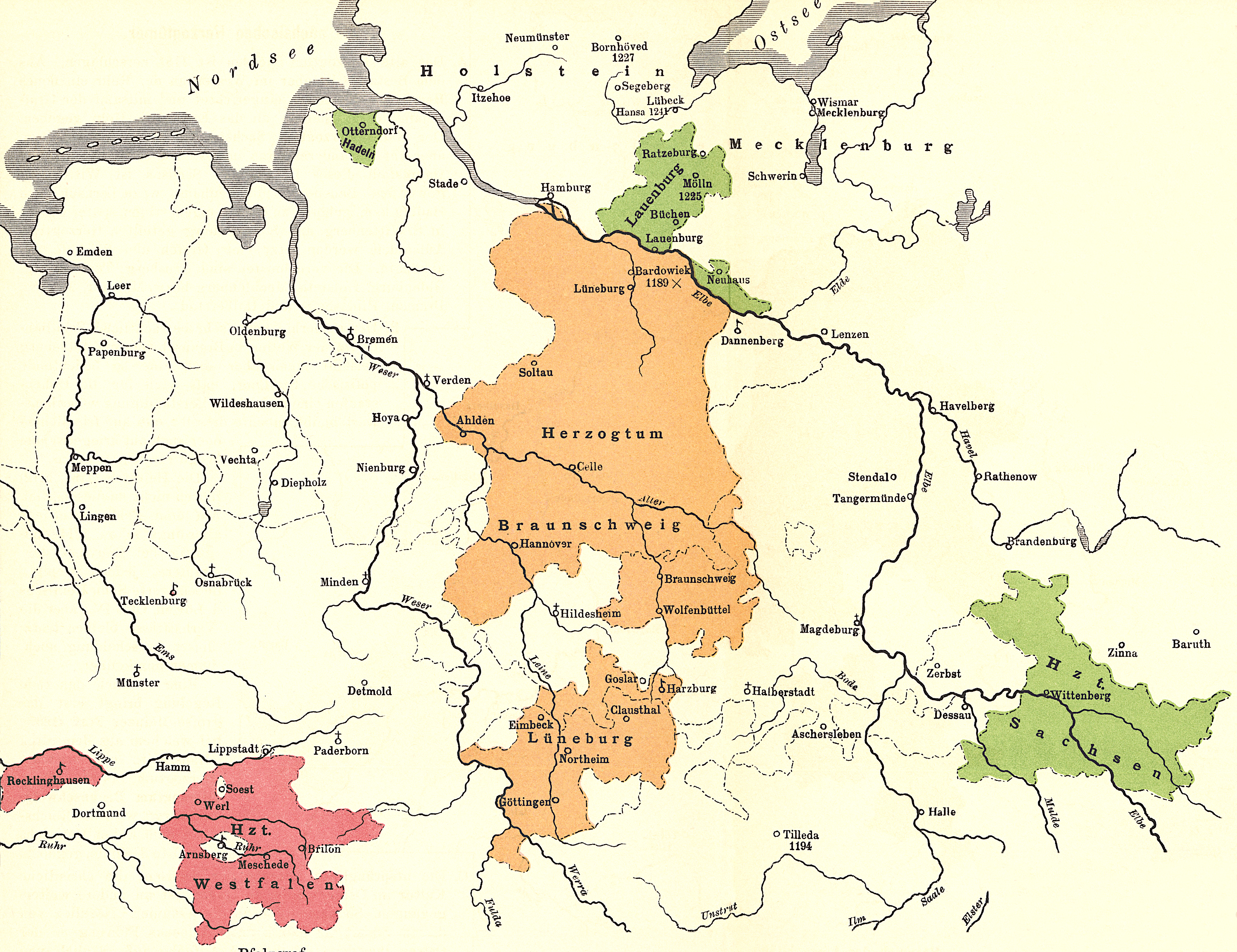
Duchies in Saxon lands (1235): the Ascanian Duchy of Saxony (green), the Welf Duchy of Brunswick-Lüneburg, and the ecclessiastical Duchy of Westphalia

Coat of arms of Ascanians, formerly Counts of Ballenstedt

Since 1180, the ancient stem duchy of Saxony was partitioned in some dozens of territories of imperial immediacy by Barbarossa, and ceased to exist in its traditional form. The western part was split amongst several minor counties and prince-bishoprics, as well as the newly formed Duchy of Westphalia. In the east, the Ascanians, the Welf's old rivals, finally gained a severely belittled Duchy of Saxony, occupying only the easternmost, comparably small, territories along the river Elbe around Lauenburg upon Elbe and around Wittenberg upon Elbe. Limiting the lands the Ascanians gained along with the ducal title to these eastern territories caused the expansion of the name Saxony twards the eastern regions, in the modern German state of Saxony-Anhalt.

Deposed from ducal dignity, the House of Welf maintained its allodial possessions, which did not remain as part of the Duchy of Saxony after the enfeoffment of the Ascanians. The Welf possessions were elevated to the Duchy of Brunswick-Lüneburg in 1235. This duchy continued to use the old Saxon coat-of-arms showing the Saxon Steed in argent on gules, while the Ascanians adopted for the younger Duchy of Saxony their family colours, a barry of ten, in sable and or, covered by a crancelin of rhombs bendwise in vert, symbolising the Saxon dukedom.

The Ascanian dukes of Saxony continued to exercise electoral rights, thus affirming the political importance of the Saxon duchy. In 1269, 1272, and 1282 the co-ruling Ascanian brothers, dukes John I and Albert II, gradually divided their governing competences within the then three territorially unconnected Saxon areas (Hadeln, Lauenburg, and Wittenberg), thus preparing a partition. After John I had resigned in 1282 in favour of his three minor sons, dukes Eric I, John II and Albert III, followed by his death three years later, the three brothers and their uncle Albert II continued the joint rule in Saxony.

In 1288, Albert II applied to King Rudolph I for the enfeoffment of his son and heir Rudolph I with the Palatinate of Saxony, an old palatine county in the Saale-Unstrut region, which ensued a long-lasting dispute with the eager clan of the House of Wettin. When the County of Brehna was reverted to the Empire after the extinction of its comital family in 1290, the king enfeoffed Albert's son Rudolph with that county. In 1295, Albert II gained the County of Gommern for Saxony. King Wenceslaus II of Bohemia succeeded in bringing Albert II in favour of electing Adolf of Germany, as new emperor (Albert II signed an elector pact on 29 November 1291 that he would vote the same as Wenceslaus). On 27 April 1292 Albert II, with his nephews still minor, wielded the Saxon electoral vote, electing Adolf of Germany. The last document mentioning the joint government of Albert II with his nephews as Saxon fellow dukes dates to 1295.

=== Divisions and legacies ===
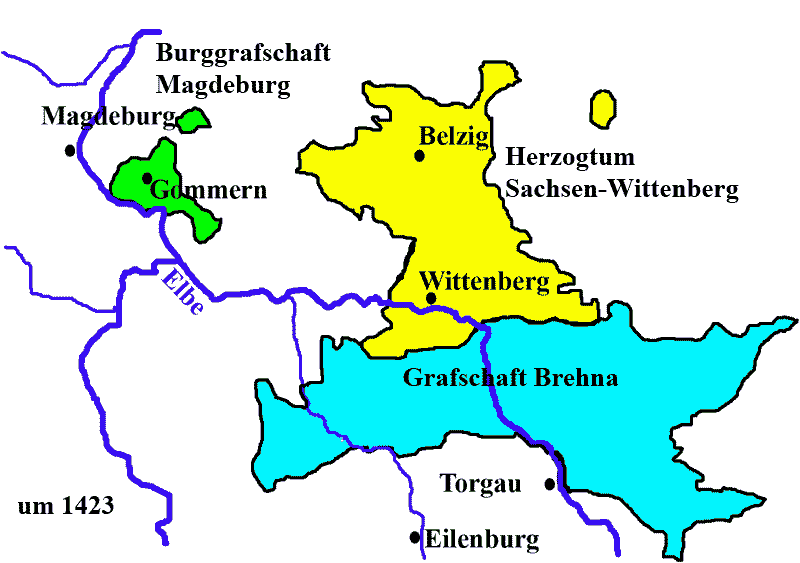
The Ascanian Duchy of Saxe-Wittenberg, with the County of Brehna and the County of Gommern

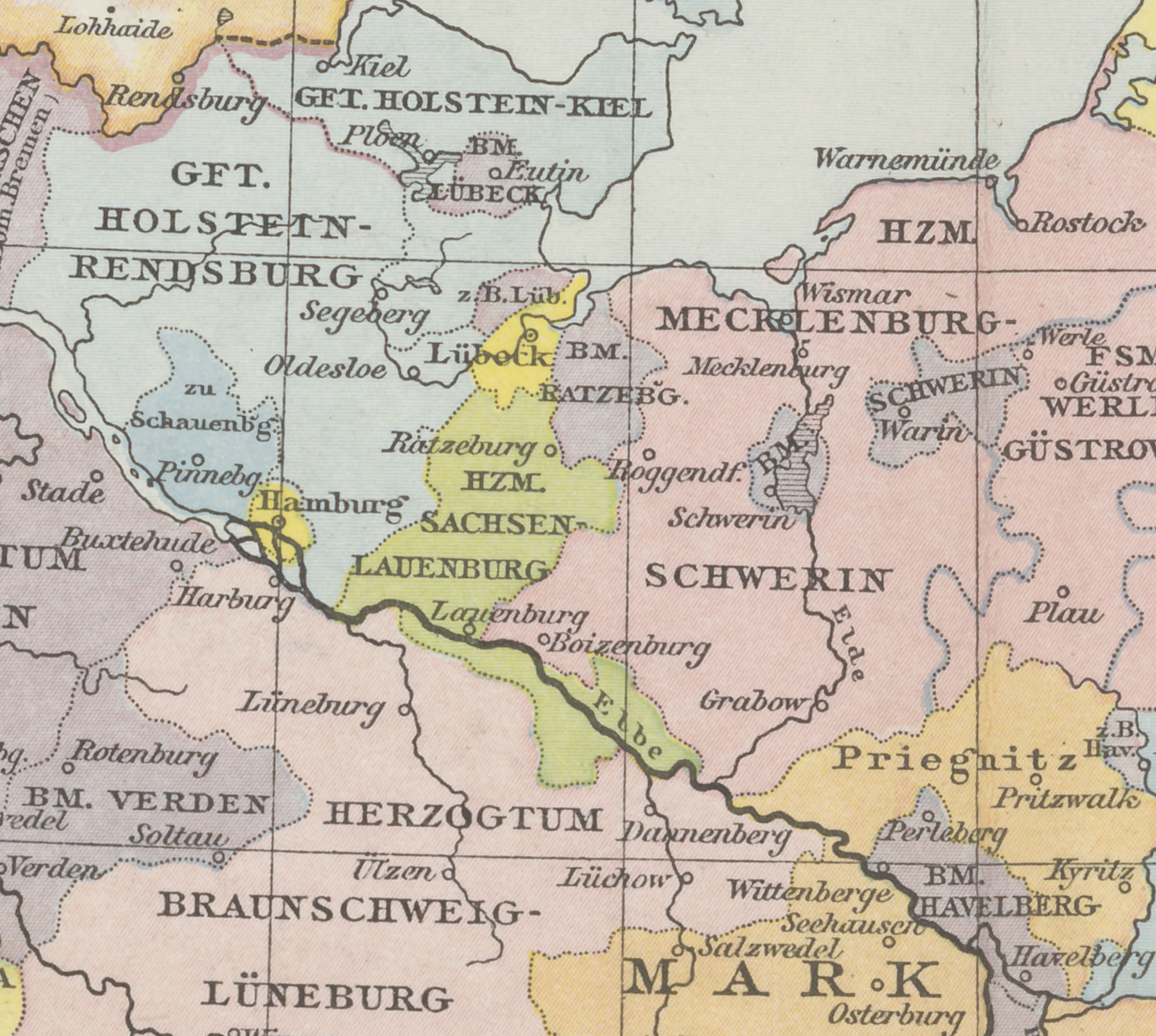
The Ascanian Duchy of Saxe-Lauenburg c. 1400

The definite partitioning of the Duchy of Saxony into two distinctive duchies of Saxe-Lauenburg (German: Herzogtum Sachsen-Lauenburg), jointly ruled by the brothers Albert III, Eric I and John II, and Saxe-Wittenberg (German: Herzogtum Sachsen-Wittenberg), ruled by Albert II, took place sometime before 20 September 1296. The Vierlande, Sadelbande (Land of Lauenburg), the Land of Ratzeburg, the Land of Darzing (today's Amt Neuhaus), and the Land of Hadeln are all mentioned as the separate territory of the brothers. Albert II received Saxe-Wittenberg around the eponymous city and Belzig, thus becoming the founder of the Ascanian Duchy of Saxe-Wittenberg, while his nephews continued to rule over the Ascanian Duchy of Saxe-Lauenburg.

On several occasions, mutual disputes over two Saxon duchies arose over the electoral rights. Those disputes were finally resolved by the Golden Bull of 1356, by granting those rights to dukes of Saxe-Wittenberg, thus defining the Saxe-Wittenberg duchy as the Electorate of Saxony. Upon the extinction of Saxe-Wittenberg line in 1422, the remaining Ascanian ducal line of Saxe-Lauenburg claimed both the Saxe-Wittenberg ducal lands and the Saxon electoral dignity. Those request were denied by the emperor Sigismund, who granted all Saxe-Wittenberg possessions and titles to the rival House of Wettin (1423).

Since that time, the newly emerging agglomeration of Wettin lands in the middle Elbe regions (Saxe-Wittenberg, March of Meissen, Osterland and various possessions throughout Thuringia) led to the additional expansion of Saxon territorial designations, in spite of numerous Wettin dynastic divisions (such as the Treaty of Leipzig in 1485) that all included the Saxon ducal title. Thus, the regional notion of the Upper Saxony was created and expanded (the term promoted by the formation of Upper Saxon Circle in 1512). It was centered on the Wettin Electorate of Saxony, while in time the core territories of the former stem duchy in the old Saxony came to be known as the Lower Saxony (the term promoted by the creation of Lower Saxon Circle in 1512).

In spite of holding wast possessions in the old (lower) Saxony, non of the House of Welf cadet branches, such as the ducal house of Welf-Brunswick, included the Saxon designation into the names of their duchies and principalities. In 1689, upon the extinction of the male ducal line in the Ascanian Duchy of Saxe-Lauenburg, the neighboring Welf-Lüneburg ruler captured Saxe-Lauenburg, but already in 1705 it passed to the Electorate of Brunswick-Lüneburg, ruled by the Welf House of Hanover.

== Territories seceded from Saxony after 1180 ==
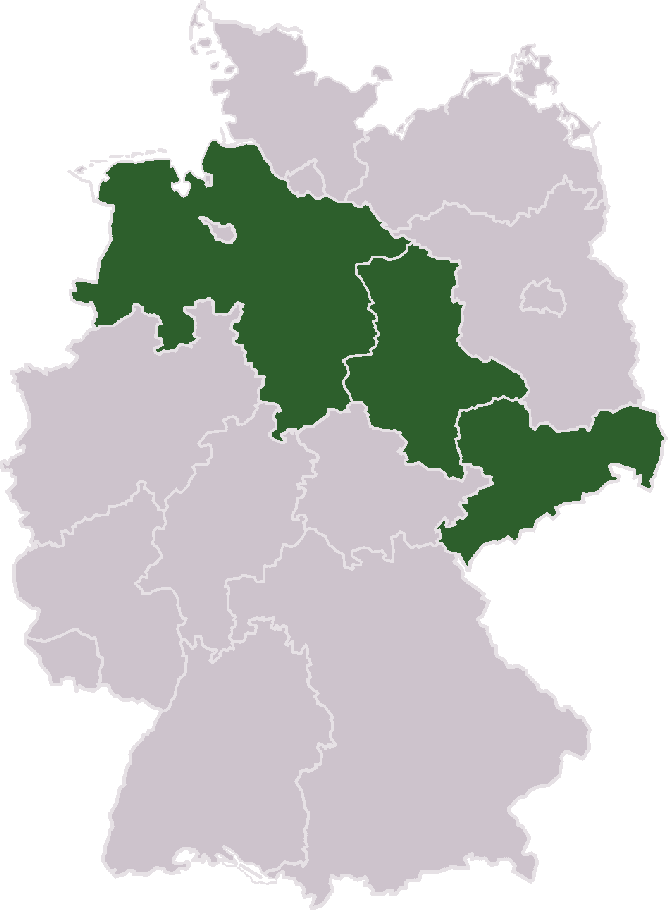
Map showing the location of the three states, Lower Saxony in the northwest, Saxony-Anhalt in the center, and the Free State of Saxony in the southeast, within today's Germany

A number of seceded territories even gained imperial immediacy, while others only changed their liege lord on the occasion. The following list includes states that existed in the territory of the former stem duchy in addition to the two legal successors of the stem duchy, the Ascanian Duchy of Saxony formed in 1296 centered around Wittenberg and Lauenburg, as well as the Duchy of Westphalia, held by the Archbishops of Cologne, that already split off in 1180.

=== Westphalia ===
- Duchy of Westphalia
- County of Bentheim
- County of Mark
- Prince-Bishopric of Münster
- Prince-Bishopric of Osnabrück
- County of Ravensberg
- County of Tecklenburg

=== Angria ===
- Prince-Archbishopric of Bremen
- Abbacy of Corvey
- County of Delmenhorst
- County of Diepholz
- County of Everstein
- County of Hoya
- Lordship of Lippe, an allodial possession within the Duchy of Saxony until 1180, gaining disputed imperial immediacy
- Prince-Bishopric of Minden
- County of Oldenburg
- Prince-Bishopric of Paderborn
- Prince-Bishopric of Verden
- County of Waldeck

=== Eastphalia ===
- County of Blankenburg, until 1180 a Saxon fief, then a fief of the Prince-Bishopric of Halberstadt
- County of Brunswick, later the Duchy of Brunswick-Lüneburg (1235), the Welf allodial possessions
- Abbacy of Gandersheim
- Prince-Bishopric of Halberstadt
- Prince-Bishopric of Hildesheim
- County of Hohenstein, seated in Hohenstein
- Prince-Archbishopric of Magdeburg
- County of Mansfeld
- Abbacy of Quedlinburg
- County of Wernigerode
- Abbey of St. Ludger
- Werden Abbey

=== Nordalbingia ===
- County of Holstein
- Prince-Bishopric of Lübeck
- Prince-Bishopric of Ratzeburg
- Prince-Bishopric of Schwerin

== Dukes of Saxony ==
Liudolfing/Ottonian dynasty

- Liudolf (c. 850–866)
- Bruno (866–880)
- Otto I the Illustrious (880–912)
- Henry I the Fowler (912–936)
- Otto II the Great (936–961)

== See also ==
- Saxony (disambiguation)
- History of Saxony

== Sources ==
- Althoff, Gerd (1999). "Saxony and the Elbe Slavs in the Tenth Century". The New Cambridge Medieval History. Vol. 3. Cambridge: Cambridge University Press. pp. 267–292.
- Bachrach, Bernard S.; Bachrach, David S., eds. (2014). Widukind of Corvey: Deeds of the Saxons. Washington: The Catholic University of America Press.
- Bachrach, David S. (2012). Warfare in Tenth-Century Germany. Woodbridge: The Boydell Press.
- Bachrach, David S. (2013). "Henry I of Germany's 929 military campaign in archaeological perspective". Early Medieval Europe. 21 (3): 307–337.
- Bowlus, Charles R. (1995). Franks, Moravians, and Magyars: The Struggle for the Middle Danube, 788-907. Philadelphia: University of Pennsylvania Press.
- Goldberg, Eric J. (2006). Struggle for Empire: Kingship and Conflict under Louis the German, 817-876. Ithaca: Cornell University Press.
- MacLean, Simon (2003). Kingship and Politics in the Late Ninth Century: Charles the Fat and the end of the Carolingian Empire. New York: Cambridge University Press.
- McKitterick, Rosamond (1983). The Frankish Kingdoms Under the Carolingians, 751-987. Harlow: Longman.
- McKitterick, Rosamond (2008). Charlemagne: The Formation of a European Identity. Cambridge: Cambridge University Press.
- Reuter, Timothy, ed. (1992). The Annals of Fulda. Manchester and New York: Manchester University Press.
- Reuter, Timothy (2013) [1991]. Germany in the Early Middle Ages c. 800–1056. London and New York: Routledge.
- Scholz, Bernhard Walter; Rogers, Barbara, eds. (1970). Carolingian Chronicles: Royal Frankish Annals and Nithard's Histories. Ann Arbor: University of Michigan Press.
- Stieldorf, Andrea (2026) [2012]. Marken und Markgrafen: Studien zur Grenzsicherung durch die fränkisch-deutschen Herrscher (2nd ed.). Wiesbaden: Harrassowitz Verlag.
- Trillmich, Werner, ed. (1957). Thietmar von Merseburg: Chronik. Darmstadt: Wissenschaftliche Buchgesellschaf.
- Warner, David A., ed. (2001). Ottonian Germany: The Chronicon of Thietmar of Merseburg. Manchester and New York: Manchester University Press.
- Wilson, Peter (2016). Heart of Europe: A History of the Holy Roman Empire. Cambridge: Harvard University Press.
