= John IV of Saxe-Lauenburg (prince-bishop) =

Prince-Bishop of Hildesheim

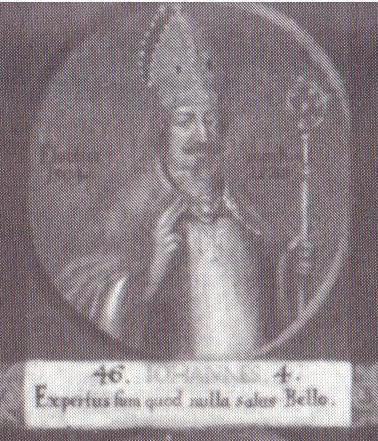
John IV as the 46th Bishop of Hildesheim in a painting of all Hildesheim bishops up to the end of the 18th century. Latin inscription: "I have learnt that in war no salvation lies."

John IV of Saxe-Lauenburg (German: Johannes von Sachsen-Lauenburg) (c. 1483–1547) was a Prince-Bishop of Hildesheim.

== Life ==
The son of Dorothea of Brandenburg and Duke John V of Saxe-Lauenburg (who is also known, confusingly, as John IV) stood for election as prince-archbishop of Bremen, however, the majority of the canons of the cathedral chapters of Bremen and Hamburg (with only three votes) elected Johann Rode archbishop on 30 January 1497. In 1503 John was elected as Prince-Bishop of Hildesheim, after his brother and predecessor in office, Eric, had resigned in his favour earlier the same year.

In 1504, following confirmation of his election by Pope Julius II, John took up office in the bishopric. On 28 January 1506 the bishop received agreement from the noble assembly (Ständeversammlung) to his raising of the Landbede, a tax.

Through his attempts to expand the territory of the prince-bishopric, he repeatedly clashed with the dukes of Brunswick-Lüneburg. Internally, too, there were conflicts with the town of Hildesheim and the self-assured bishopric nobles (Stiftsadel). The diocese of Hildesheim ran increasingly into debt.

John IV tried to consolidate prince-episcopal sovereignty into the Prince-Bishopric of Hildesheim again. Within a few years he was able to save enough to take back the castles and property pledged to the bishopric nobles. However, the latter refused to pay the redemption fees. Not until 1518 was John given the necessary regalia (rights) by Emperor Maximilian.

John IV was the central figure in the Hildesheim Diocesan Feud. Following his imperial ban, Bishop John of Hildesheim sought asylum with the Prince-Elector Joachim of Brandenburg and hoped in vain to be reinstated. In summer 1527 he resigned from office and went, freed from his ban, to become a canon at Ratzeburg in the homonymous prince-bishopric, where he died on 20 November 1547.

== Ancestry ==
Ancestors of John IV of Saxe-Lauenburg (prince-bishop)

16. Eric II, Duke of Saxe-Lauenburg
8. Eric IV, Duke of Saxe-Lauenburg
17. Agnes of Holstein
4. Bernard II, Duke of Saxe-Lauenburg
18. William the Victorious, Duke of Brunswick-Lüneburg
9. Sophia of Brunswick-Lüneburg
19. Cecilia of Brandenburg
2. John V, Duke of Saxe-Lauenburg
20. Bogislaw V, Duke of Pomerania
10. Bogislaw VIII, Duke of Pomerania
21. Adelheid of Brunswick-Grubenhagen
5. Adelheid of Pomerania-Stolp
22. Henry II, Count of Holstein-Rendsburg
11. Sophia of Holstein-Rendsburg
23. Sophia of Werle
1. John of Saxe-Lauenburg
24. Frederick V, Burgrave of Nuremberg
12. Frederick I, Elector of Brandenburg
25. Elisabeth of Meissen
6. Frederick II, Elector of Brandenburg
26. Frederick, Duke of Bavaria
13. Elisabeth of Bavaria
27. Maddalena Visconti
3. Dorothea of Brandenburg
28. Frederick III, Landgrave of Thuringia
14. Frederick I, Elector of Saxony
29. Catherine of Henneberg
7. Catherine of Saxony
30. Henry the Mild, Duke of Brunswick-Lüneburg
15. Catherine of Brunswick-Lüneburg
31. Sophie of Pomerania-Barth

== Notes ==
John of Saxe-Lauenburg House of Ascania Born: c. 1483 Died: 20 November 1547
Catholic Church titles
Regnal titles
Preceded by Eric II of Saxe-Lauenburg	Prince-Bishop of Hildesheim as John IV; 1503–1527	Succeeded by Balthasar Merklin
