= Eric of Saxe-Lauenburg =

Eric of Saxe-Lauenburg may refer to:

- Eric I, Duke of Saxe-Lauenburg (1280–1360),
- Eric II, Duke of Saxe-Lauenburg (1318–1368)
- Eric III, Duke of Saxe-Lauenburg (died 1401)
- Eric IV, Duke of Saxe-Lauenburg (1354–1411)
- Eric V, Duke of Saxe-Lauenburg (died 1436)
- Eric of Saxe-Lauenburg (prince-bishop) (1472–1522)
