= Eric of Saxe-Lauenburg (prince-bishop) =

- Born: 1472
- Died: 20 October 1522
- Noble family: House of Ascania
- Father: John V, Duke of Saxe-Lauenburg
- Mother: Dorothea of Brandenburg

Eric of Sachsen-Lauenburg (1472 – 20 October 1522) was Bishop of Hildesheim as Eric II from 1502 to 1503 and Bishop of Münster as Eric I from 1508 to 1522.

== Life ==
Eric was one of ten children of Duke John V of Saxe-Lauenburg and Dorothea of Brandenburg (1446–1519), daughter of the Elector Frederick II of Brandenburg. He came into contact with the cathedral chapter at Cologne at an early age. In 1484 it was proposed that he should study at university, so he went to Cologne and graduated in law (in particular, canon law) at the University of Cologne.

In 1487, he was ordained as a priest and on 27 October 1490, he received a prebendary in Cologne. He held another prebendary in Hildesheim, where he was elected bishop on 21 May 1502. His election was confirmed by Pope Alexander VI. His consecration was scheduled for 12 July 1503, however, he resigned before that date in favour of his brother John IV of Saxe-Lauenburg, possibly because the Diocese of Hildesheim was too heavily indebted. Eric returned to his post in Cologne.

In 1508, Conrad VI of Rietberg, Bishop of Osnabrück and Münster, died. The cathedral chapter at Münster elected Eric as his successor, preferring him over Francis of Waldeck and John of Rietberg, a nephew of the late Conrad and canon at Cologne. Eric was consecrated a bishop in the same year and celebrated his First Mass, assisted by his brother John and his half-brother Bernard. Eric appointed Bernard of Saxony (died before 21 February 1549), an illegitimate son of his father (not to be confused with his legitimate brother Bernard of Saxe-Lauenburg, died 1524, Provost of Cologne and Magdeburg), as auxiliary bishop in Münster.

During the Hildesheim Diocesan Feud, Eric supported his brother, the Bishop of Hildesheim. This, he belonged to the League of Lüneburg, opposing Henry the Younger of Brunswick-Wolfenbüttel, Eric I of Brunswick-Göttingen-Calenberg, Bishop Francis of Minden, and the Knights of Saldern. Emperor Charles V imposed an imperial ban on all members of the League, including Eric.

During a dispute with Count Klaus the Hedges Rider of Tecklenburg, Eric occupied the County of Lingen.

== Ancestry ==
Ancestors of Eric of Saxe-Lauenburg (prince-bishop)

16. Eric II, Duke of Saxe-Lauenburg
8. Eric IV, Duke of Saxe-Lauenburg
17. Agnes of Holstein
4. Bernard II, Duke of Saxe-Lauenburg
18. William the Victorious, Duke of Brunswick-Lüneburg
9. Sophia of Brunswick-Lüneburg
19. Cecilia of Brandenburg
2. John V, Duke of Saxe-Lauenburg
20. Bogislaw V, Duke of Pomerania
10. Bogislaw VIII, Duke of Pomerania
21. Adelheid of Brunswick-Grubenhagen
5. Adelheid of Pomerania-Stolp
22. Henry II, Count of Holstein-Rendsburg
11. Sophia of Holstein-Rendsburg
23. Sophia of Werle
1. Eric of Saxe-Lauenburg
24. Frederick V, Burgrave of Nuremberg
12. Frederick I, Elector of Brandenburg
25. Elisabeth of Meissen
6. Frederick II, Elector of Brandenburg
26. Frederick, Duke of Bavaria
13. Elisabeth of Bavaria
27. Maddalena Visconti
3. Dorothea of Brandenburg
28. Frederick III, Landgrave of Thuringia
14. Frederick I, Elector of Saxony
29. Catherine of Henneberg
7. Catherine of Saxony
30. Henry the Mild, Duke of Brunswick-Lüneburg
15. Catherine of Brunswick-Lüneburg
31. Sophie of Pomerania-Barth

Eric of Saxe-Lauenburg House of Ascania Born: 1472 Died: 20 October 1522
Catholic Church titles
Regnal titles
Preceded by Berthold II of Landsberg	Prince-Bishop of Hildesheim as Eric II; 1502–1503	Succeeded by John IV of Saxe-Lauenburg
Preceded by Conrad IV of Rietberg	Prince-Bishop of Münster as Eric I 1508–1522	Succeeded by Frederick III of Wied
