= John IV of Saxe-Lauenburg =

John IV

Duke of Saxe-Lauenburg
- Reign: 1401–1412
- Predecessor: Eric IV of Saxe-Lauenburg
- Successor: Eric V of Saxe-Lauenburg
- Died: 1414
- House: House of Ascania
- Father: Eric IV of Saxe-Lauenburg
- Mother: Sophia of Brunswick-Lüneburg

John IV of Saxe-Lauenburg (*?–1414*) was a son of Duke Eric IV of Saxe-Lauenburg and Sophia of Brunswick-Lüneburg.

== Life ==
When Eric III of Saxe-Bergedorf-Mölln had died in 1401, John's father, Eric IV, inherited the branch duchy of the deceased. Subsequently, he shared the reign in the reunited duchy of Saxe-Lauenburg with John and his brother Eric V. However, most of Saxe-Bergedorf-Mölln had been alienated, such as the Herrschaft of Mölln (sold to Lübeck in 1359 under a repurchase agreement) and the Herrschaft of Bergedorf, the Vierlande, half the Saxon Wood and Geesthacht, all of which Eric III had pawned to the city of Lübeck in 1370.

Eric III had entitled Lübeck to take possession of these areas, once he had deceased, until his heirs would repay the credit and thus redeem them and simultaneously exercise their right to repurchase Mölln, requiring together a total sum of 26,000 Lübeck marks. In 1401 Eric IV, supported by his sons Eric V and John IV, forcefully captured the pawned areas without any repayment, before Lübeck could take possession of them. Lübeck acquiesced.

John had due debts with burghers of Hamburg. On a visit there under safe conduct granted by the Hamburg's senate (the city government), his creditor Heyne Brandes (later in modern standard High German also: Hein Brand[t]) took the defaulting duke to task and dunned him in a way the duke considered insulting. The duke complained to the senate. The senate cited Brandes, who admitted the dunning, and arrested him. This caused a civic uproar of Hamburgers, electing from each of the then four parishes 12 representatives, the Council of the Forty-Eighters (die Achtundvierziger), who on Saint Lawrence Day (10 August) stipulated with the senate the Recess of 1410 (considered Hamburg's oldest constitutional act), denying the senate's privilege to arrest without a prior judicial hearing. The Forty-Eighters, in 1687 extended to the Council of the Sixty (die Sechziger), persisted and developed into the first permanent representation of the citizens of Hamburg, the nucleus of the Hamburg Parliament.

In 1411 John IV and his brother Eric V and their father Eric IV pawned their share in the Vogtei over the Bailiwick of Bederkesa and in the Bederkesa Castle to the Senate of Bremen including all "they have in the jurisdictions in the Frisian Land of Wursten and in Lehe, which belongs to the afore-mentioned castle and Vogtei". Their share in jurisdiction, Vogtei and castle had been acquired from the plague-stricken Knights of Bederkesa, who had dropped into decline after 1349/1350. Eric V ended his joint reign with John IV after their father Eric IV had deceased in 1412. After John IV died in 1414 without an heir.

== Ancestry ==
Ancestors of John IV of Saxe-Lauenburg

16. John I, Duke of Saxony
8. Eric I, Duke of Saxe-Lauenburg
17. Ingeborg Birgersdotter of Småland
4. Eric II, Duke of Saxe-Lauenburg
18. Bogislaw IV, Duke of Pomerania
9. Elisabeth of Pomerania
19. Matilda of Brandenburg
2. Eric IV, Duke of Saxe-Lauenburg
20. Gerard II, Count of Holstein-Plön
10. John III, Count of Holstein-Plön
21. Agnes of Brandenburg
5. Agnes of Holstein
22. Henry III, Duke of Silesia-Glogau
11. Catherine of Silesia-Glogau
23. Matilda of Brunswick-Lüneburg
1. John IV, Duke of Saxe-Lauenburg
24. Albert II, Duke of Brunswick-Lüneburg
12. Magnus the Pious, Duke of Brunswick-Lüneburg
25. Rixa of Werle
6. Magnus II, Duke of Brunswick-Lüneburg
26. Henry I, Margrave of Brandenburg-Stendal
13. Sophia of Brandenburg-Stendal
27. Agnes of Bavaria
3. Sophia of Brunswick-Lüneburg
28. Bernard II, Prince of Anhalt-Bernburg
14. Bernhard III, Prince of Anhalt-Bernburg
29. Helen of Rugia
7. Catherine of Anhalt-Bernburg
30. Rudolph I, Duke of Saxe-Wittenberg
15. Agnes of Saxe-Wittenberg
31. Bridget of Brandenburg

== Notes ==
John IV of Saxe-Lauenburg House of Ascania Died: 1414
Regnal titles
Preceded by Eric IV	Dukes of Saxe-Lauenburg; 1401–1412 with Eric IV (father) (1368–1412); Eric V (brother) (1401–1435)	Succeeded by Eric V
