= Eric V of Saxe-Lauenburg =

Eric V

Duke of Saxe-Lauenburg
- Reign: 1401–1435
- Predecessor: Eric IV of Saxe-Lauenburg
- Successor: Bernard II of Saxe-Lauenburg
- Born: late 14th century
- Died: c. mid-1430s
- Consort: Elisabeth of Holstein-Rendsburg; Elisabeth of Weinsberg
- House: House of Ascania
- Father: Eric IV of Saxe-Lauenburg
- Mother: Sophia of Brunswick-Lüneburg

Eric V of Saxe-Lauenburg (late 14th century – c. mid-1430s) was a member of the House of Ascania; son of Duke Eric IV of Saxe-Lauenburg and Sophia of Brunswick-Lüneburg. Eric V and his brother John IV jointly succeeded their father in 1412 as dukes of Saxe-Lauenburg. After John IV had died in 1414, Eric ruled alone.

== Life ==
When Eric III of Saxe-Bergedorf-Mölln had died in 1401, Eric V's father, Eric IV, inherited the branch duchy of the deceased. Subsequently, he shared the reign in the reunited duchy with Eric V and his brother John. However, most of Eric III's branch duchy had been alienated, such as the Herrschaft of Mölln (sold to Lübeck in 1359 under a repurchase agreement) and the Herrschaft of Bergedorf, the Vierlande, half the Sachsenwald and Geesthacht, all of which Eric III had pawned to the city of Lübeck in 1370.

Eric III had entitled Lübeck to take possession of these areas, once he had deceased, until his heirs would repay the credit and thus redeem them and simultaneously exercise their right to repurchase Mölln, requiring together a total sum of 26,000 Lübeck marks. In 1401 Eric IV, supported by his sons Eric V and John IV, forcefully captured the pawned areas without any repayment, before Lübeck could take possession of them. Lübeck acquiesced. In 1411 Eric V and his brother John IV and their father Eric IV pawned their share in the Vogtei over the Bailiwick of Bederkesa and in the Bederkesa Castle to the Senate of Bremen including all "they have in the jurisdictions in the Frisian Land of Wursten and in Lehe, which belongs to the afore-mentioned castle and Vogtei". Their share in jurisdiction, Vogtei and castle had been acquired from the plague-stricken Knights of Bederkesa, who had dropped into decline after 1349/1350.

In 1420 Eric V attacked Frederick I, Elector of Brandenburg and Lübeck gained Hamburg for a war alliance in support of Brandenburg. Armies of both cities opened a second front and conquered Bergedorf, Riepenburg castle and the Esslingen river toll station (today's Zollenspieker Ferry) within weeks. This forced Eric V to agree to the Peace of Perleberg on 23 August 1420, which stipulated that all the pawned areas, which Eric V, Eric IV and John IV had violently taken in 1401, were to be irrevocably ceded to the cities of Hamburg and Lübeck.

When in 1422 the Ascanians died out in the Electorate of Saxony (Saxe-Wittenberg), which together with Saxe-Lauenburg had been partitioned from the Duchy of Saxony in 1296, Eric V aimed at reuniting Saxony in his hands. Especially he was after the Saxon electoral privilege, which had been disputed between Saxe-Lauenburg and Saxe-Wittenberg since John I had died in 1285. However, in 1356 Emperor Charles IV exclusively accepted Saxe-Wittenberg as electorate, with Saxe-Lauenburg not giving up its claim.

However, Sigismund, Holy Roman Emperor, had already granted Margrave Frederick IV the Warlike of Meissen an expectancy on the Saxon electorate, in order to remunerate his military support. On 1 August 1425 Sigismund enfeoffed the Wettinian Prince-Elector Frederick I of Saxony, despite protestations of the Ascanian Eric V.

Weakened in his position Eric's younger brother Bernard urged the duke to share his reign. In 1426 Eric V finally agreed and made Bernard the co-duke, who also succeeded him.

== Marriages and issue ==
In 1404 Eric V married (1) Elisabeth of Holstein-Rendsburg (1360–1416), daughter of Nicholas, Count of Holstein-Rendsburg and widow of Albert IV, Duke of Mecklenburg. Eric V and Elisabeth had no common children.

Before 1422 Eric V married Elisabeth of Weinsberg (1397–after 1498), daughter of Conrad IX of Weinsberg. Their son Henry died young in 1437. Thus Eric V was succeeded by his younger brother Bernard II.

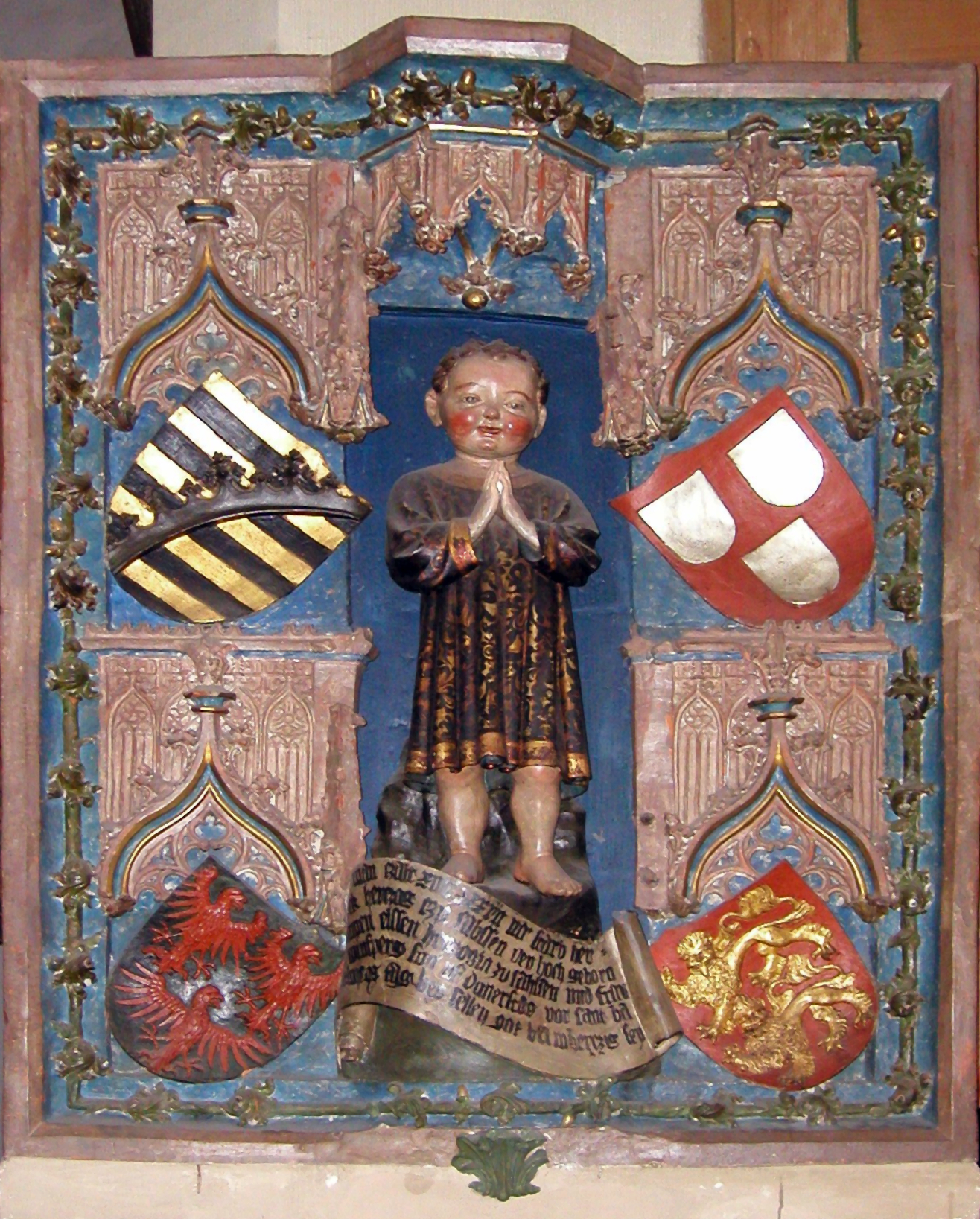
Epitaph for Henry of Saxony, Angria and Westphalia in St. George Church of Weikersheim.

* Henry (?–1437)

Henry died while staying with his maternal grandparents and was buried in today's Lutheran Town Church of St. George in Weikersheim, where this epitaph commemorates the boy.

== Ancestry ==
Ancestors of Eric V of Saxe-Lauenburg

16. John I, Duke of Saxony
8. Eric I, Duke of Saxe-Lauenburg
17. Ingeborg Birgersdotter of Småland
4. Eric II, Duke of Saxe-Lauenburg
18. Bogislaw IV, Duke of Pomerania
9. Elisabeth of Pomerania
19. Matilda of Brandenburg
2. Eric IV, Duke of Saxe-Lauenburg
20. Gerard II, Count of Holstein-Plön
10. John III, Count of Holstein-Plön
21. Agnes of Brandenburg
5. Agnes of Holstein
22. Henry III, Duke of Silesia-Glogau
11. Catherine of Silesia-Glogau
23. Matilda of Brunswick-Lüneburg
1. Eric V, Duke of Saxe-Lauenburg
24. Albert II, Duke of Brunswick-Lüneburg
12. Magnus the Pious, Duke of Brunswick-Lüneburg
25. Rixa of Werle
6. Magnus II, Duke of Brunswick-Lüneburg
26. Henry I, Margrave of Brandenburg-Stendal
13. Sophia of Brandenburg-Stendal
27. Agnes of Bavaria
3. Sophia of Brunswick-Lüneburg
28. Bernard II, Prince of Anhalt-Bernburg
14. Bernhard III, Prince of Anhalt-Bernburg
29. Helen of Rugia
7. Catherine of Anhalt-Bernburg
30. Rudolph I, Duke of Saxe-Wittenberg
15. Agnes of Saxe-Wittenberg
31. Bridget of Brandenburg

== Notes ==
Eric V of Saxe-Lauenburg House of Ascania Died: 1436
Regnal titles
Preceded by Eric IV	Dukes of Saxe-Lauenburg; 1401–1435 with Eric IV (father) (1368–1411); John IV (brother) (1401–1412); Bernard II (brother) (1426–1463)	Succeeded by Bernard II
