= Magnus of Saxe-Lauenburg =

Magnus of Saxe-Lauenburg may refer to:

- Magnus of Saxe-Lauenburg, Bishop of Hildesheim (1390-1452)
- Magnus I of Saxe-Lauenburg (1470-1543), Duke of Saxe-Lauenburg between 1507 and 1543
- Magnus II of Saxe-Lauenburg (1543-1603), Duke of Saxe-Lauenburg between 1571 and 1573
