= Eric III =

Eric III may refer to:

- Eric Anundsson, also known as Eric Eymundsson and Eric III of Sweden, (d. 882)
- Eric III of Denmark, Erik III Håkonssøn Lam, (ca. 1100/1105–1146), king of Denmark from 1137 until he abdicated in 1146
- Eric III, Duke of Saxe-Lauenburg (mid-1330s–1401)
- Eric of Pomerania, Eric III of Norway, (1381/1382–1459), king of Norway (1389–1442), elected King of Denmark (1396–1439), and of Sweden (1396–1439)
