= Dorothea of Brandenburg, Duchess of Saxe-Lauenburg =

Dorothea of Brandenburg
- Born: 1446
- Died: March 1519 (aged 72–73)
- Spouse: John V, Duke of Saxe-Lauenburg (also counted IV)
- Father: Frederick II, Elector of Brandenburg
- Mother: Catherine of Saxony

Dorothea of Brandenburg (1446 – March 1519) was a princess of Brandenburg by birth and by marriage Duchess of Saxe-Lauenburg.

== Life ==
Dorothea was the eldest child of Elector Frederick II of Brandenburg (1413–1471) from his marriage to Catherine (1421–1476), daughter of Elector Frederick I of Saxony.

She married on 12 February 1464 in Lüneburg Duke John V of Saxe-Lauenburg (1439–1507). As she was oldest daughter of the Elector Frederick, who had no surviving sons, the marriage agreement was important. In addition to a 10000 florins dowry, Frederick promised his son-in-law everything that he could legally leave to his daughter. Later, however, Frederick abdicated in favour of his younger brother Albert Achilles, so as to keep his possessions in the family.

Frederick also failed to pay the dowry to his son-in-law. This led Dorothea's uncle John the Alchemist (1406 – 1464) to compare himself with the Elector Frederick.

== Offspring ==
From her marriage with John of Saxony, Angria and Westphalia, as he was officially titled, Dorothea had the following children:

- Adelheid (died young)
- Sophia (died in or before 1497)

married on 29 November 1491 Anthony of Schauenburg and Holstein-Pinneberg (1439 – 22 December 1526)

- Magnus I (1470–1543), Duke of Saxe-Lauenburg
- Eric (1472–1522), as Eric I prince-bishop of Hildesheim (1501–1503) and as Eric II prince-bishop of Münster (1508–1522)
- Catherine, Cistercian nun in Reinbek bei Hamburg
- Bernhard (died 1524), canon at Cologne Cathedral and Magdeburg Cathedral
- John (1483–1547), as John IV Prince-Bishop of Hildesheim (1503–1547)
- Rudolph (died 1503)
- Elisabeth (died circa 1542)

married Duke Henry IV of Brunswick-Grubenhagen (1460–1526)

- Henry (died young)
- Frederick (died before 1501)
- Anna (died 1504)

married firstly in 1490 Count John of Lindau-Ruppin (died 1500)
married secondly, in about 1503, Count Frederick Spiegelberg (died 1537)
