= Magnus of Saxe-Lauenburg (bishop) =

Bishop of Cammin and Hildesheim

Magnus of Saxe-Lauenburg (German: Magnus von Sachsen-Lauenburg) (b 1390; d 21 September 1452) was Bishop of Cammin and Hildesheim.

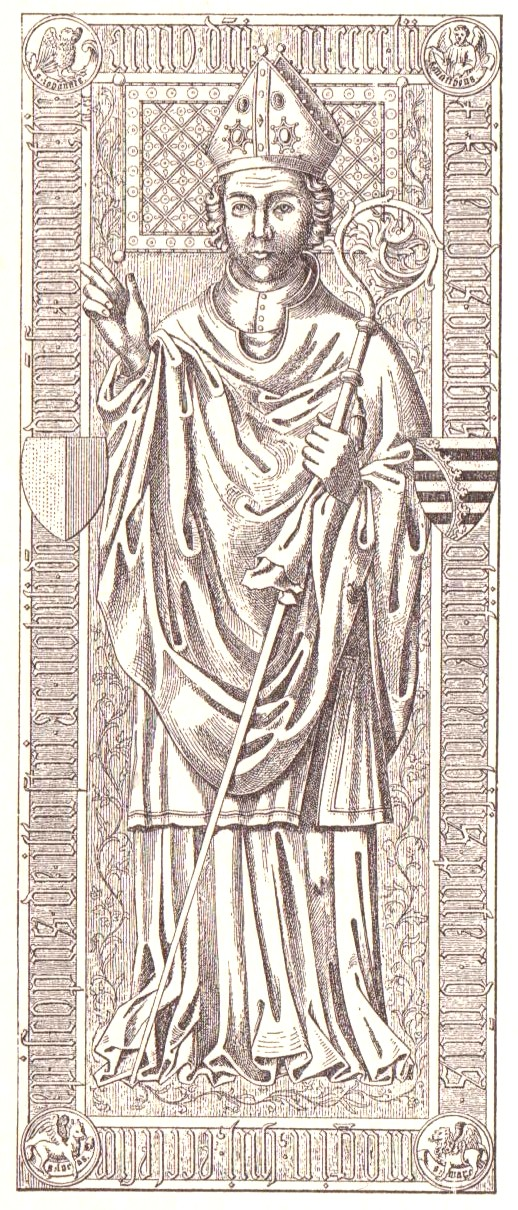
Grave plate of Magnus of Saxe-Lauenburg

== Family ==
The father of Magnus was Duke Eric IV of Saxe-Lauenburg; his mother was Sophia, a daughter of Duke Magnus II of Brunswick. His brothers were Duke Eric V of Saxe-Lauenburg and Duke Bernard II of Saxe-Lauenburg.

== Bishop in Cammin ==
He entered priestly service and was a canon in Cammin. Under a dispensation from having to attain the required canonical age, Magnus was appointed Bishop of Cammin in 1410 by Pope Alexander V. This appointment was a result of the Western Schism, because there was also a Bishop Nicholas in the Bishopric, a supporter of Gregory XII. Even though the latter died after a short period, Magnus' post was not undisputed. In 1415, Gregory XII assigned the Bishopric to the Bishop of Schleswig, John of Gudensberg. With the general recognition of Martin V as pope in 1418, Magnus was also accepted as the sole Bishop of Cammin. A short time afterwards he was officially ordained bishop.

In the years that followed he concentrated on preserving the independence of the territory of the bishopric, the Stift. In 1417, he was enfeoffed with Cammin by King Sigismund; this came with its recognition as an Imperial Estate. In 1422, this found expression in its entry in the Reichsmatrikel. Magnus also tried to regain the estates of the Stift enfeoffed by his predecessors.

Despite that, the position of the bishop was not recognised by Bogislav IX and other magnates, and the disputes continued.

== Bishop of Hildesheim ==
In 1424, Magnus moved to the seat of the Bishop of Hildesheim. Previously, he had been appointed as coadjutor by Bishop John III. During his reign, the monastery's debts had risen sharply. He had also faced external threats.

Magnus arrived in Hildesheim in 1425 and called for an extended electoral capitulation. He tried to strengthen his position as the territorial lord in the Bishopric of Hildesheim, securing and expanding its area. Internally, he was keen to end disorder and bring peace. To that end, he entered into alliances with neighbouring territories and cities.

He tried to establish a good relationship with the city of Hildesheim. This was successful overall. But at times, however, there were conflicts between the city's aspirations for independence and his attempt to expand his territorial lordship. Magnus also tried to redeem the Bishopric's fiefs. However, this was only possible for Steuerwald Castle.

The need for money led to the levying of taxes (Bede). This required the approval of the Landstände. In doing so, they expanded their influence. In addition, castles, districts Ämter, income and other legal rights had to be pledged. In return, parts of the lordships of Everstein and Homburg were acquired. Thus the Bishopric of Hildesheim reached its greatest extent.

In the ecclesial life of the Bishopric, Magnus introduced a number of indulgences. The festival of the Presentation of Mary was introduced for the first time. He also supported monastic reform efforts. Where necessary, he also used his power as a territorial lord for this purpose. He supported Nicholas of Cusa.

In 1452, Magnus appointed Bernard of Brunswick-Lüneburg as coadjutor and resigned shortly afterwards. In the same year he died and was buried in Hildesheim Cathedral.

== Literature ==
- Hans-Georg Aschoff (1987). "Magnus, Herzog von Sachsen-Lauenburg". Neue Deutsche Biographie (in German). Vol. 15. Berlin: Duncker & Humblot. pp. 663–664. (full text online).

Preceded by Nikolaus Bock von Schippenbeil	Bishop of Cammin; 1410–1424	Succeeded by Siegfried II of Bock

Preceded by John III of Hoya	Bishop of Hildesheim; 1424–1452	Succeeded by Bernard II of Brunswick-Lüneburg
