= John III of Saxe-Lauenburg =

John III

Duke of Saxe-Bergedorf-Mölln
- Reign: 1343–1356
- Predecessor: Albert IV of Saxe-Lauenburg
- Successor: Albert V of Saxe-Lauenburg
- Born: mid-1330s
- Died: 1356
- House: Ascania
- Father: Albert IV of Saxe-Lauenburg
- Mother: Beata of Schwerin

John III of Saxe-Lauenburg (mid 1330s – 1356) was the eldest son of Duke Albert IV of Saxe-Lauenburg and Beata of Schwerin (*?–before 1341*), daughter of Gunzelin VI, Count of Schwerin. John III succeeded his father in 1343 as Duke of Saxe-Bergedorf-Mölln, a branch duchy of Saxe-Lauenburg. He died without an heir and was succeeded by his younger brother Albert V.

== Ancestry ==
Ancestors of John III of Saxe-Lauenburg

8. John I, Duke of Saxony
4. John II, Duke of Saxe-Lauenburg
9. Ingeborg Birgersdotter of Småland
2. Albert IV, Duke of Saxe-Lauenburg
10. Henry I, Count of Schauenburg and Holstein-Rendsburg
5. Elisabeth of Schauenburg and Holstein-Rendsburg
11. Heilwig of Bronckhorst
1. John III, Duke of Saxe-Lauenburg
12. Niklot I, Count of Schwerin-Wittenburg
6. Gunzelin VI, Count of Schwerin
13. Elisabeth of Schauenburg and Holstein-Kiel
3. Beata of Schwerin
14. Otto IV, Count of Tecklenburg
7. Richardis (Rixa) of Tecklenburg
15. Beatrix of Rietberg

John (Johann) III, Duke of Saxony, Angria and Westphalia House of Ascania Born: mid-1330s Died: 1356
Regnal titles
Preceded by Albert IV	Duke of Saxe-Bergedorf-Mölln; 1343–1356	Succeeded by Albert V
