= John V of Saxe-Lauenburg =

John V
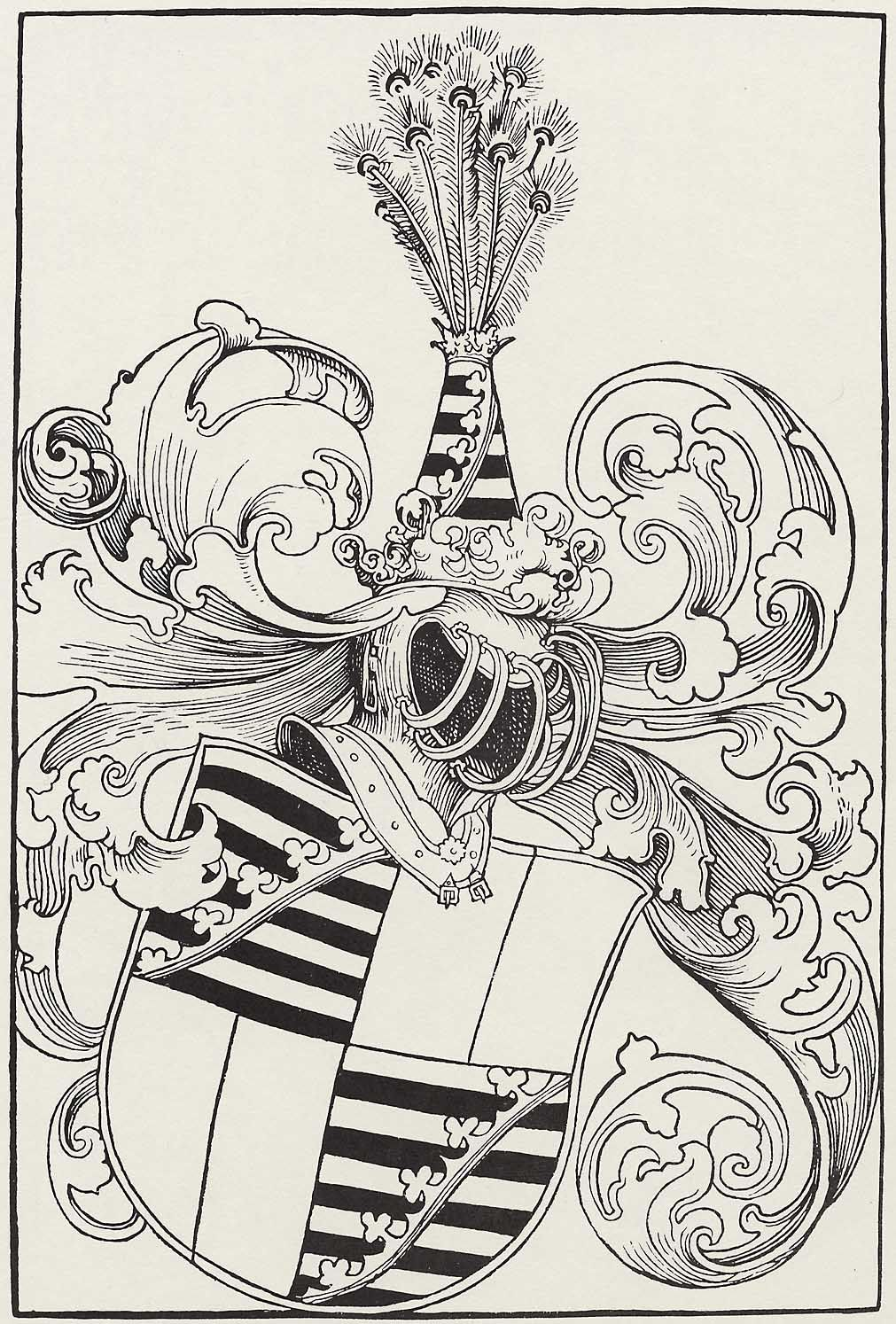
- Woodcut by Lucas Cranach the Elder: Coat-of-arms of John V

Duke of Saxe-Lauenburg
- Reign: 1463–1507
- Predecessor: Bernard II
- Successor: Magnus I
- Born: 18 July 1439
- Died: 15 August 1507 (aged 68)
- Spouse: Dorothea of Brandenburg
- Issue more...: Magnus I Eric II/I; John IV, Prince-Bishop of Hildesheim
- House: House of Ascania
- Father: Bernard II
- Mother: Adelheid of Pomerania-Stolp
- Religion: Roman Catholic

John V of Saxe-Lauenburg (also numbered John IV; 18 July 1439 – 15 August 1507) was the eldest son of Duke Bernard II of Saxe-Lauenburg and Adelheid of Pomerania-Stolp (1410 – after 1445), daughter of Duke Bogislaus VIII of Pomerania-Stolp. He succeeded his father in 1463 as duke of Saxe-Lauenburg.

== Life ==
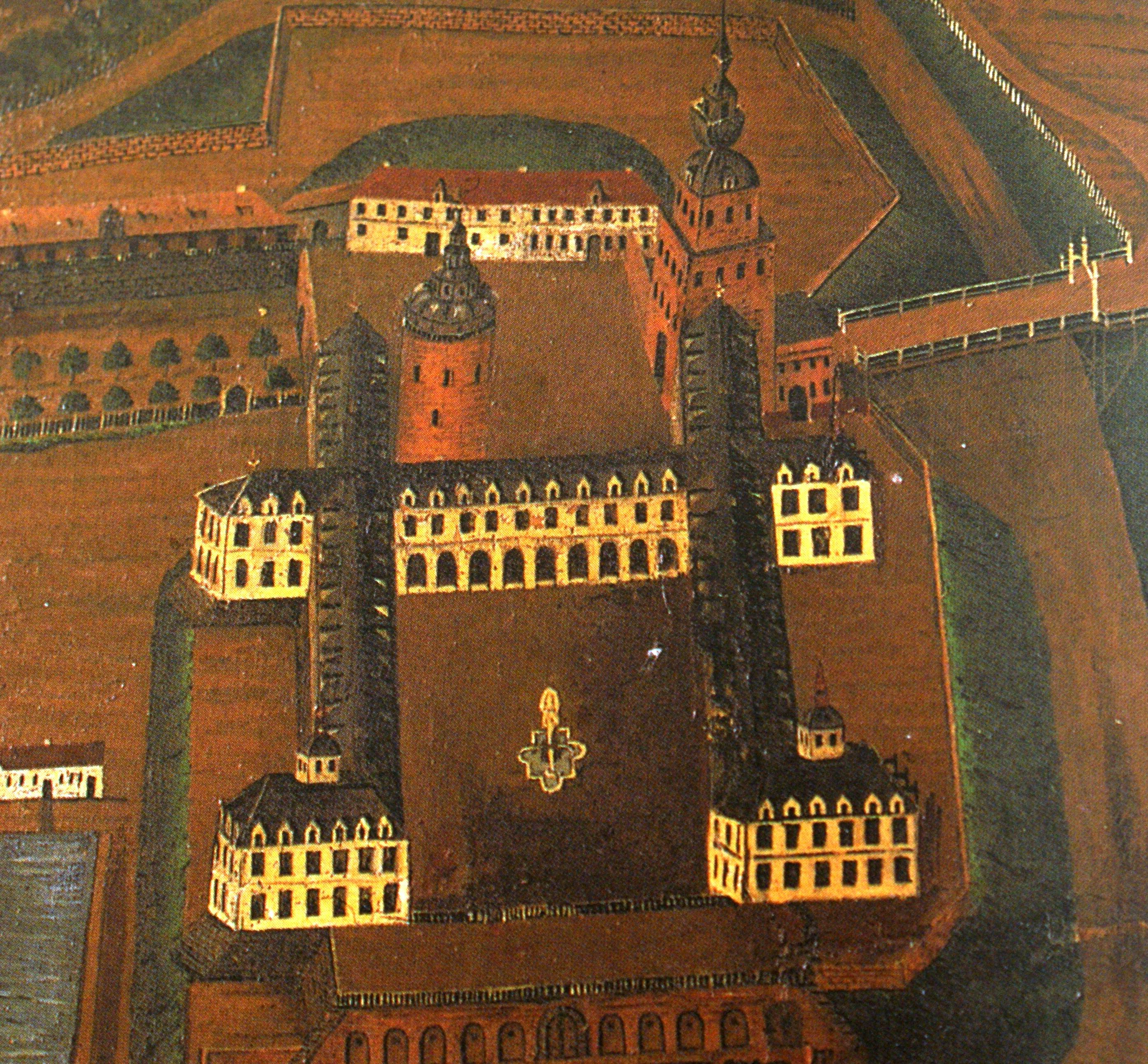
The ducal residential castle in Lauenburg upon Elbe.

After a fire John V reconstructed Saxe-Lauenburg's residential castle in Lauenburg upon Elbe, started in 1180–1182 by Duke Bernard I.

In 1481 John V redeemed Saxe-Lauenburg's exclave Land of Hadeln, which had been pawned to Hamburg as security for a credit of 3,000 Rhenish guilders since 1407. John V then made his son and heir apparent, Magnus, vice-regent of Hadeln, and finally regent as of 1498.

Having advanced to regent Magnus, who in 1484 had failed to conquer the rich Land of Wursten, a de facto autonomous region of free Frisian peasants in a North Sea marsh at the Weser estuary, won his father and Henry IV the Elder of Brunswick and Lunenburg, Prince of Wolfenbüttel on 24 November 1498 as allies in a second attempt to conquer Wursten. However, on 9 September 1499 the pre-emptive feud of the joint forces of Wursten, the Prince-Archbishopric of Bremen, Ditmarsh, the cities of Bremen, Buxtehude, Hamburg, and Stade against John V and Magnus turned the latter's campaign into an adventure involving heavy losses. By early December 1499 Prince-Archbishop Johann Rode of Bremen converted Henry IV to their column so that Magnus lacked support.

Mediated by Eric I of Brunswick and Lunenburg, Prince of Calenberg and Henry IV, Rode and Magnus for his father John V concluded peace on 20 January 1500. Hadeln was restored to Magnus, while the Wursteners rendered homage to Rode on 18 August, thus in the end little had changed as compared with the status quo ante.

== Marriage and issue ==
On 12 February 1464 John V married Dorothea of Brandenburg (1446 – March 1519), daughter of Frederick II, Elector of Brandenburg, and they had the following children:

- Adelheid (*?–died as a child*)
- Sophia (*died latest 1497*), on 29 November 1491 ∞ Antonius of Schaumburg
- Magnus I (*1 January 1470 – 1 August 1543*)
- Bernard (*? – 1524*), canon in Cologne and Magdeburg
- Eric (*1472–20 October 1522*), as Eric II Prince-Bishop of Hildesheim (1501–1503) and as Eric I Münster (1508–1522)
- John (*1483–20 November 1547*), as John IV Prince-Bishop of Hildesheim (1503–1547)
- Anna von Sachsen-Lauenburg (1468–1504*), ∞ in 1490 John (Johannes Steitz?) of Lindow-Ruppin
- Frederick (*?–before 1501*)
- Rudolph (*?–1503*)
- Henry (died as a child)
- Catherine, Cistercian nun in Reinbek bei Hamburg
- Elisabeth (*1489–1541*), ∞ Duke Henry IV, Duke of Brunswick-Grubenhagen.

One of John V's illegitimate children was:

- Bernhardus Sasse (in Low Saxon, Latin: Bernardus de Saxonia, German: Bernhard von Sachsen; died before 21 February 1549), auxiliary bishop in Münster and titular bishop of Ptolemais in Phoenicia (today's Akko), as of 23 March 1519.

== Notes ==
John V of Saxe-Lauenburg House of Ascania Born: 18 July 1439 Died: 15 August 1507
Regnal titles
Preceded by Bernard II	Duke of Saxe-Lauenburg; 1463–1507	Succeeded by Magnus I
