= Albert V of Saxe-Lauenburg =

Albert V

Duke of Saxe-Bergedorf-Mölln
- Reign: 1356 – 1370
- Predecessor: John III
- Successor: Eric III
- Born: mid-1330s
- Died: 1370
- Spouse: Catherine of Werle-Güstrow
- House: House of Ascania
- Father: Albert IV
- Mother: Beata of Schwerin

Albert V of Saxe-Lauenburg (mid 1330s – 1370) was the second son of Duke Albert IV of Saxe-Lauenburg and Beata of Schwerin (*?–before 1341*), daughter of Gunzelin VI, Count of Schwerin. Albert succeeded his elder brother John III in 1356 as Duke of Saxe-Bergedorf-Mölln, a branch duchy of Saxe-Lauenburg. He died without an heir and was succeeded by his younger brother Eric III.

Short on money, and after consenting with his brother Eric III, Albert V sold the Herrschaft of Mölln to the city of Lübeck for 9737.50 Lübeck marks. The parties agreed upon a repurchase, however only by the duke or his heirs for themselves - not as a middleperson for someone else. Lübeck considered this acquisition crucial, since Mölln was an important stage for trade - especially in salt - between Brunswick and Lunenburg, via Lübeck to Scandinavia, and back. Lübeck therefore manned Mölln with armed guards to maintain law and order on the roads.

However, thrifty Albert V, plotted for new sources of revenue. He and his cousin Eric II of Saxe-Lauenburg–Ratzeburg-Lauenburg agreed on ravaging merchants and other travellers passing their duchies near Hamburg. So in 1363 the city of Hamburg and Adolphus VII, Count of Schauenburg and Holstein-Kiel, supported by his relative Prince-Archbishop Albert II of Bremen, freed the streets northeast of the city from the brigandage by Eric II and Albert V, conquering the latter's castle in Bergedorf.

By 25 January 1366 Albert married Catherine of Werle-Güstrow (*?–after 17 December 1402*), daughter of Lord Nicholas III of Werle-Güstrow. Catherine and Albert had no children.

== Ancestry ==
Ancestors of Albert V of Saxe-Lauenburg

16. Albert I, Duke of Saxony
8. John I, Duke of Saxony
17. Helen of Brunswick and Lunenburg
4. John II, Duke of Saxe-Lauenburg
18. Birger Jarl
9. Ingeborg Birgersdotter of Småland
19. Ingeborg Eriksdotter of Sweden
2. Albert IV, Duke of Saxe-Lauenburg
20. Gerard I, Count of Schauenburg and Holstein-Itzehoe
10. Henry I, Count of Schauenburg and Holstein-Rendsburg
21. Elisabeth of Mecklenburg
5. Elisabeth of Schauenburg and Holstein-Rendsburg
22. Florence of Bronckhorst
11. Heilwig of Bronckhorst
23. Ermengarde of Anholt
1. Albert V, Duke of Saxe-Lauenburg
24. Gunzelin III, Count of Schwerin
12. Niklot I, Count of Schwerin-Wittenburg
25. Margaret of Mecklenburg
6. Gunzelin VI, Count of Schwerin
26. John I, Count of Schauenburg and Holstein-Kiel
13. Elisabeth of Schauenburg and Holstein-Kiel
27. Elisabeth of Saxony
3. Beata of Schwerin
28. Otto III, Count of Tecklenburg
14. Otto IV, Count of Tecklenburg
29. Richarda of Mark
7. Richardis (Rixa) of Tecklenburg
30. Frederick I, Count of Rietberg
15. Beatrix of Rietberg
31. Beatrix of Horstmar

== Notes ==
Albert V of Saxe-Lauenburg House of Ascania Born: mid-1330s Died: 1370
Regnal titles
Preceded by John III	Duke of Saxe-Bergedorf-Mölln; 1356–1370	Succeeded by Eric III
