= Albert IV of Saxe-Lauenburg =

German duke

Albert IV

Duke of Saxe-Bergedorf-Mölln
- Reign: 1321–1343
- Predecessor: John II of Saxe-Lauenburg
- Successor: John III of Saxe-Lauenburg
- Born: 1315
- Died: 1343 (aged 27–28)
- Saxon consorts: (1) Beata of Schwerin (2) Sophia of Werle-Güstrow
- Issue Detail: John III; Albert V Eric III
- House of: Ascania (by birth)
- Father: John II of Saxe-Lauenburg
- Mother: Elisabeth of Schauenburg and Holstein-Rendsburg

Albert IV of Saxe-Lauenburg (1315 – 1343) was a Duke of Saxe-Lauenburg. He was the eldest son of John II of Saxe-Lauenburg and Elisabeth of Holstein-Rendsburg (*ca. 1300–before 1340*), sister of Gerard III the Great. In 1321 Albert IV succeeded his father as Duke of Saxe-Bergedorf-Mölln, a branch duchy of Saxe-Lauenburg, while his mother served as regent, before she remarried Eric Christoffersen (*1307–1331*), a son of King Christopher II and co-ruler in Denmark.

== Marriages and issue ==
Albert married twice, in 1334 (1) Beata of Schwerin (*?–before 1341*), daughter of Gunzelin VI, Count of Schwerin, and in 1341 (2) Sophia of Werle-Güstrow (*1329–5 September 1364*), daughter of Lord John II of Werle-Güstrow. Both wives also officiated as Saxon consorts. With Beata Albert had the following children:

- John III (*mid-1330s–1356*)
- Albert V (*mid-1330s–1370*)
- Eric III (*mid-1330s–1401*).

Albert (Albrecht) IV, Duke of Saxony, Angria and Westphalia House of Ascania Born: 1315 Died: 1343
Regnal titles
| Preceded by John II | Duke of Saxe-Bergedorf-Mölln; 1322–1343 | Succeeded by John III |
