= Nicholas I of Tecklenburg =

Count of Tecklenburg

Nicholas I
- Count of Tecklenburg
- Reign: 1328–1367
- Noble family: House of Hagen
- Spouse: Helena of Oldenburg-Wildeshausen-Altbruchhausen
- Father: Gunzelin VI, Count of Schwerin
- Mother: Richardis of Tecklenburg

Nicholas I, Count of Tecklenburg (died 1367), also known as Nicholas III of Schwerin, was a German noble in the Holy Roman Empire.

== Life ==
Nicholas was the son of Gunzelin VI, Count of Schwerin and Richardis, the daughter of Count Otto IV of Tecklenburg. In 1328, he succeeded his uncle, Count Otto V of Tecklenburg, as count of Tecklenburg-Ibbendüren and count of Lingen and Cloppenburg. He was initially considered an outsider, however, he managed to prove himself capable of the job.

He was elected captain of Osnabrück, to establish law and order, despite weak rule by the bishop. In 1350, he lost some territory to the bishop of Osnabrück, including Fuurstenau, Schwagsdorf and Berge. However, he acquired Altbruchhausen from his father-in-law, although he later had to abdicate there, due to his high debts.

Nicholas inherited the County of Schwerin from his brother Otto I in 1357. However, in 1358, he sold it to Mecklenburg.

== Marriage and issue ==
Nicholas married Helena, the daughter of Count Otto of Oldenburg-Wildeshausen-Altbruchhausen. They had two children:

- Otto VI (died 1388)
- Richardis, married Count Otto III of Oldenburg-Dolmenhorst (died 1418).

Nicholas I of Tecklenburg House of Schwerin Died: 1367
Preceded by Otto V	Count of Tecklenburg; 1328-1367	Succeeded by Otto VI
Preceded by Otto I	Count of Schwerin; 1357-1358	Succeeded by Albert II as Duke of Mecklenburg
