= Otto I of Schwerin =

- Died: 1357
- Noble family: House of Hagen
- Spouse: Matilda of Werle
- Father: Gunzelin VI, Count of Schwerin
- Mother: Richardis of Tecklenburg

Otto I of Schwerin (died 1357) was a son of Count Gunzelin VI and Richardis of Tecklenburg. In 1327, he succeeded his father as Count of Schwerin.

Otto was married to Princess Mathilda of Werle, a daughter of John III of Werle. They had a daughter:

- Richardis (d. 1377). She married Albert III of Mecklenburg-Schwerin (1340–1412), who was also king of Sweden.

Otto I died in 1357. He had no male heir and was succeeded by his brother Nicholas I.

Otto I of Schwerin House of Schwerin Died: 1357
Preceded by Günzelin VI	Count of Schwerin; 1327-1357	Succeeded by Nicholas I
