= Bernard II of Saxe-Lauenburg =

Bernard II
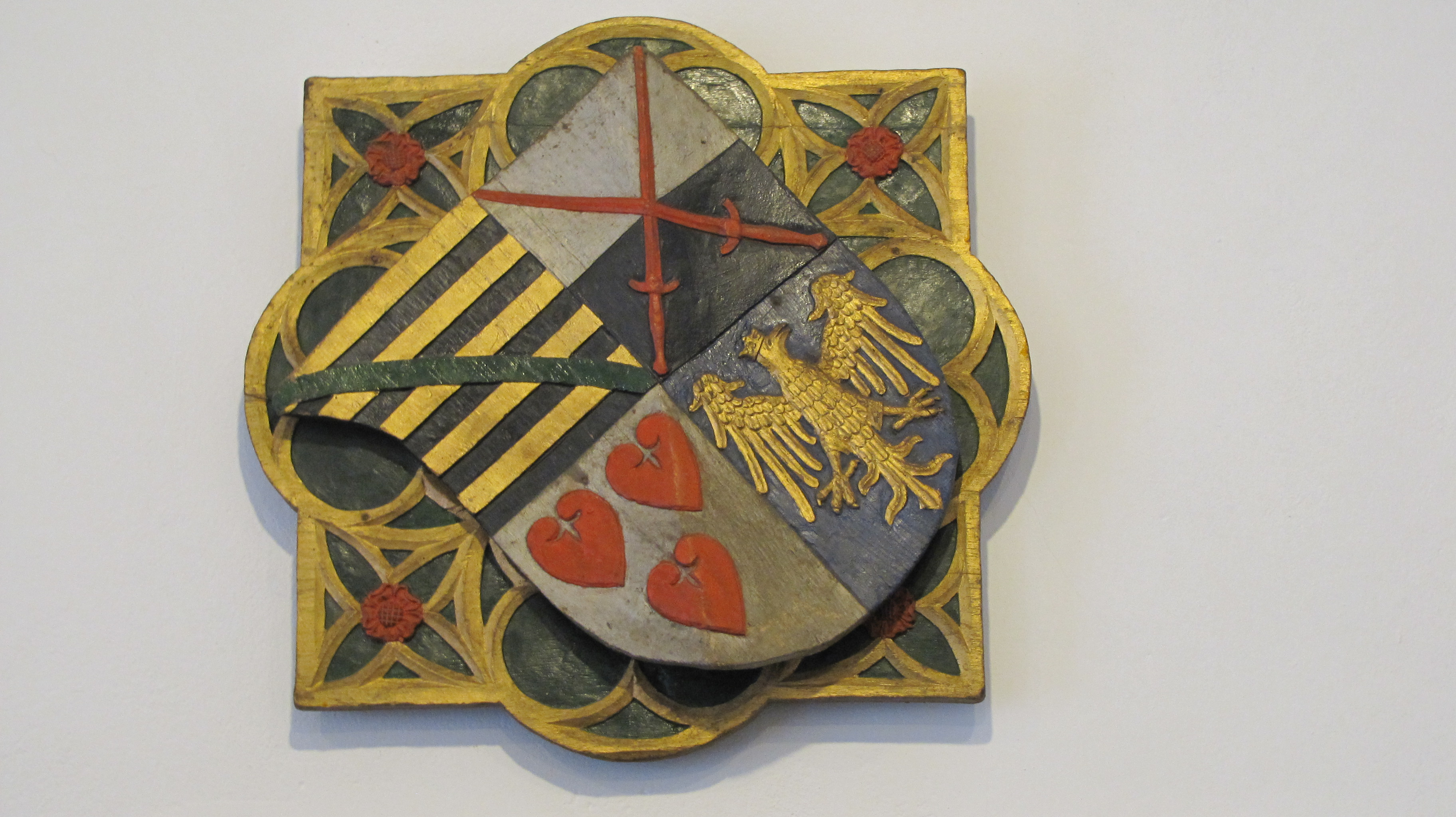
- Bernard's coat of arms, formerly Ratzeburg Cathedral, now District Museum, Ratzeburg

Duke of Saxe-Lauenburg
- Reign: 1426–63
- Predecessor: Eric V
- Successor: John V
- Born: ca. 1385/1392
- Died: 16 July 1463
- Consort: Adelheid of Pomerania-Stolp
- Issue more...: Sophia, Duchess of Jülich-Berg; John V, Duke of Saxe-Lauenburg
- House: Ascania
- Father: Eric IV of Saxe-Lauenburg
- Mother: Sophia of Brunswick-Lüneburg

Bernard II of Saxe-Lauenburg (German: Bernhard II.; c. 1385/1392 – 16 July 1463) was a member of the House of Ascania and Duke of Saxe-Lauenburg from 1426 to 1463. His full title was Duke of Saxony, Angria and Westphalia, however only ruling the branch duchy of Saxe-Lauenburg between 1426 and 1463.

== Life ==
He was a son of Eric IV, Duke of Saxe-Lauenburg and Sophia of Brunswick-Lüneburg. Bernard urged his ruling brother Eric V to share his reign. Failed in his fight for the Saxon electorate Eric finally agreed and made Bernard the co-duke of Saxe-Lauenburg in 1426. When Eric V died in 1435 Bernard continued the reign alone.

Bernard II reinforced Saxe-Lauenburg's claim to inherit Electoral Saxe-Wittenberg with the latter and Saxe-Lauenburg having been partitioned from the younger Duchy of Saxony in the 13th century. Following his great-great-great-great grandfather Bernard I, the first Ascanian duke of younger Saxony, Bernard II is counted as second.

In 1444, during the Soester feud, King Frederik III referred the Soest delegation to the court of Duke Bernard of Saxe-Lauenburg. The people of Soest also rejected Duke Bernhard of Saxe-Lauenburg as an arbitrator. The duke largely agreed with the archbishop of Cologne in 1444.

== Coat of Arms ==
In order to strengthen his claim Bernard adopted the Saxe-Wittenbergian coat-of-arms for Saxe-Lauenburg. The coat of arms shows in the upper left quarter the Ascanian barry of ten, in Or and sable, covered by a crancelin of rhombs bendwise in vert. The crancelin symbolises the Saxon ducal crown. The second quarter shows in azure an eagle crowned in Or, representing the imperial Pfalzgraviate of Saxony. The third quarter displays in argent three water-lily leaves in gules, standing for the County of Brehna. The lower right fourth quarter shows in sable and argent the electoral swords (German: Kurschwerter) in gules, indicating the Saxon office as Imperial Arch-Marshal (German: Erzmarschall, Latin: Archimarescallus), pertaining to the Saxon privilege as Prince-elector, besides the right to elect a new emperor after the decease of the former.

The different quarters of the coat of arms, from then on representing the Duchy of Saxony, Angria and Westphalia (Lauenburg), were later often misinterpreted as symbolising Angria (Brehna's water-lily leaves) and Westphalia (the comital palatine Saxon eagle).

== Marriage and issue ==
In 1428 Bernard married Adelheid of Pomerania-Stolp (1410 – after 1445), daughter of Bogislaw VIII, Duke of Pomerania. They had the following children:

- Sophia (1428 – 9 September 1473), married Gerhard VII, Duke of Jülich-Berg
- John V (1439–1507).

== Ancestry ==
Ancestors of Bernard II of Saxe-Lauenburg

16. John I, Duke of Saxony
8. Eric I, Duke of Saxe-Lauenburg
17. Ingeborg Birgersdotter of Småland
4. Eric II, Duke of Saxe-Lauenburg
18. Bogislaw IV, Duke of Pomerania
9. Elisabeth of Pomerania
19. Matilda of Brandenburg
2. Eric IV, Duke of Saxe-Lauenburg
20. Gerard II, Count of Holstein-Plön
10. John III, Count of Holstein-Plön
21. Agnes of Brandenburg
5. Agnes of Holstein
22. Henry III, Duke of Silesia-Glogau
11. Catherine of Silesia-Glogau
23. Matilda of Brunswick-Lüneburg
1. Bernard II, Duke of Saxe-Lauenburg
24. Albert II, Duke of Brunswick-Lüneburg
12. Magnus the Pious, Duke of Brunswick-Lüneburg
25. Rixa of Werle
6. Magnus II, Duke of Brunswick-Lüneburg
26. Henry I, Margrave of Brandenburg-Stendal
13. Sophia of Brandenburg-Stendal
27. Agnes of Bavaria
3. Sophia of Brunswick-Lüneburg
28. Bernard II, Prince of Anhalt-Bernburg
14. Bernhard III, Prince of Anhalt-Bernburg
29. Helen of Rugia
7. Catherine of Anhalt-Bernburg
30. Rudolph I, Duke of Saxe-Wittenberg
15. Agnes of Saxe-Wittenberg
31. Bridget (Jutta) of Brandenburg

== Notes ==
Bernard II of Saxe-Lauenburg House of Ascania Born: ca. 1385/1392 Died: 16 July 1463
Regnal titles
Preceded by Eric V	Dukes of Saxe-Lauenburg; 1426–1463 with Eric V (brother) (1401–1435)	Succeeded by John V
