= Eric III of Saxe-Lauenburg =

Eric III
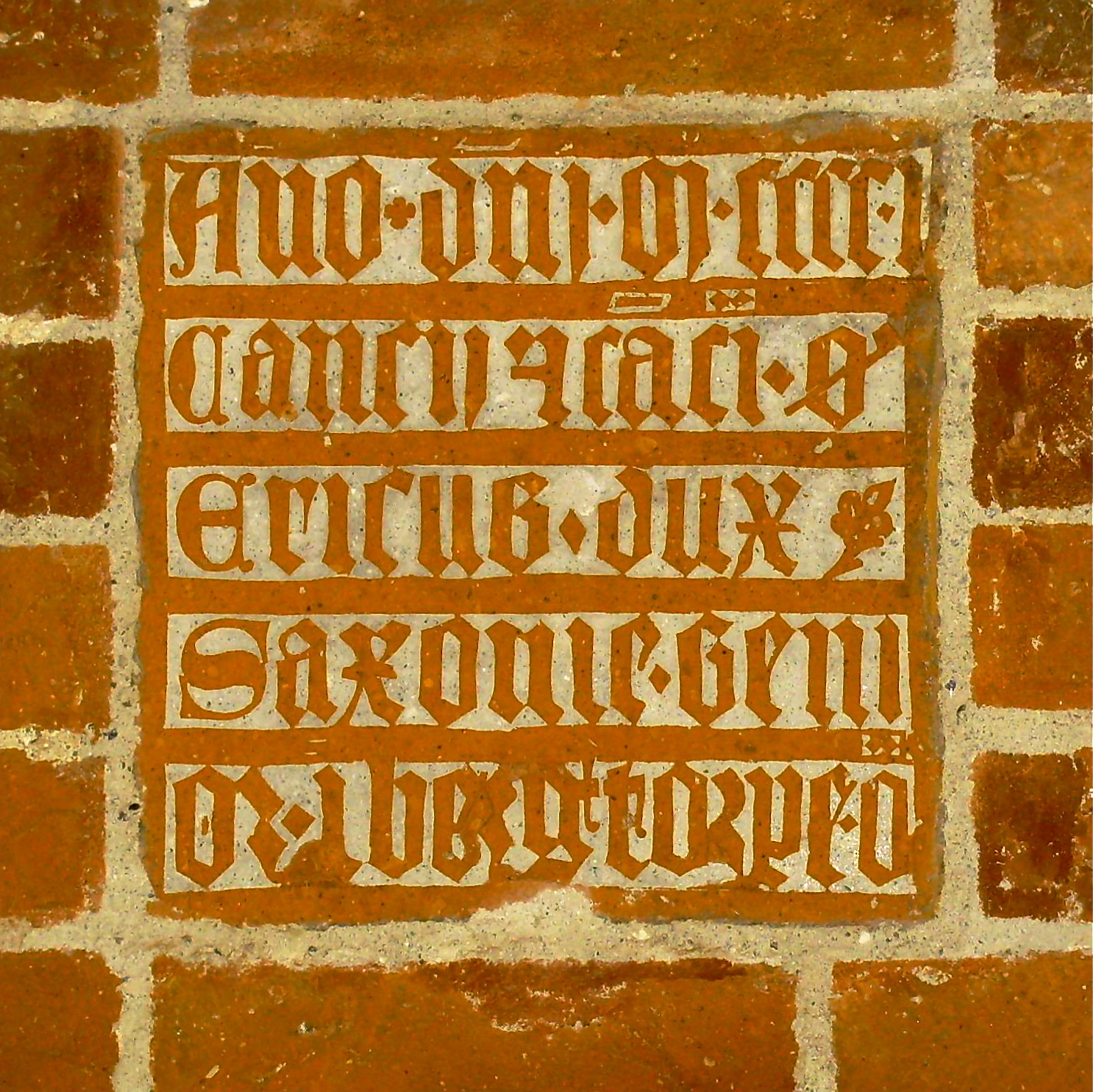
- Epitaph for Eric III in Ratzeburg Cathedral

Duke of Saxe-Bergedorf-Mölln
- Reign: 1370 – 1401
- Predecessor: Albert V
- Successor: Eric IV
- Born: mid-1330s
- Died: 1401
- Burial: Ratzeburg Cathedral
- House: Ascania
- Father: Albert IV of Saxe-Lauenburg
- Mother: Beata of Schwerin
- Religion: Roman Catholic
- Occupation: Cleric until 1370

Eric III of Saxe-Bergedorf (mid 1330s – 1401) was the youngest son of Duke Albert IV of Saxe-Lauenburg and Beata of Schwerin (*?–before 1341*), daughter of Gunzelin VI, Count of Schwerin. Eric was determined for and started a career as cleric. However, after his two elder brothers John III and Albert V had died without heirs, Eric III quit the clergy.

== Life ==
Eric consented, when on 14 April 1359 Albert V, short in money, sold the Herrschaft of Mölln to the city of Lübeck in return for 9737.50 Lübeck marks. The parties agreed upon a repurchase, however, only by the duke or his heirs for themselves, but not as a middleperson for someone else.

In 1370 Eric III succeeded Albert V as Duke of Saxe-Bergedorf-Mölln, a highly indebted branch duchy of Saxe-Lauenburg. So he pawned – in return for 16,262.5 Lübeck marks – all the remaining unencumbered parts of his branch duchy, to wit the Herrschaft of Bergedorf, the Vierlande, his half of the Saxon Wood and Geesthacht, to Lübeck. Eric III only refrained a life tenancy.

Lübeck and Eric III further stipulated, that once he would have died, Lübeck will be entitled to take possession of the pawns until his heirs would repay the credit and simultaneously exercise the repurchase of Mölln, altogether amounting to the then enormous sum of 26,000 Lübeck Marks. In 1386 Otto VI, Count of Tecklenburg-Schwerin gave permission to his cousin Eric III to claim in Otto's name the latter's inheritance of their late aunt Richardis' of Schwerin dower from the Danish King Valdemar Atterdag, protector of her dower since 1373. Eric III died without an heir and was succeeded by his cousin of second degree Eric IV of Saxe-Ratzeburg-Lauenburg. Under Eric IV the two branch duchies merged again into a reunited Saxe-Lauenburg.

== Ancestry ==
Ancestors of Eric III of Saxe-Lauenburg

16. Albert I, Duke of Saxony
8. John I, Duke of Saxony
17. Helen of Brunswick and Lunenburg
4. John II, Duke of Saxe-Lauenburg
18. Birger Jarl
9. Ingeborg Birgersdotter of Småland
19. Ingeborg Eriksdotter of Sweden
2. Albert IV, Duke of Saxe-Lauenburg
20. Gerard I, Count of Schauenburg and Holstein-Itzehoe
10. Henry I, Count of Schauenburg and Holstein-Rendsburg
21. Elisabeth of Mecklenburg
5. Elisabeth of Schauenburg and Holstein-Rendsburg
22. Florence of Bronckhorst
11. Heilwig of Bronckhorst
23. Ermengarde of Anholt
1. Eric III, Duke of Saxe-Lauenburg
24. Gunzelin III, Count of Schwerin
12. Niklot I, Count of Schwerin-Wittenburg
25. Margaret of Mecklenburg
6. Gunzelin VI, Count of Schwerin
26. John I, Count of Schauenburg and Holstein-Kiel
13. Elisabeth of Schauenburg and Holstein-Kiel
27. Elisabeth of Saxony
3. Beata of Schwerin
28. Otto III, Count of Tecklenburg
14. Otto IV, Count of Tecklenburg
29. Richarda of Mark
7. Richardis (Rixa) of Tecklenburg
30. Frederick I, Count of Rietberg
15. Beatrix of Rietberg
31. Beatrix of Horstmar

== Notes ==
Eric III, Duke of Saxony, Angria and Westphalia House of Ascania Born: mid-1330s Died: 1401
Regnal titles
Preceded by Albert V	Duke of Saxe-Bergedorf-Mölln; 1370–1401	Line extinct with Saxe-Bergedorf-Mölln inherited by Eric IV of Saxe-Ratzeburg-Lauenburg
