= Eric IV of Saxe-Lauenburg =

Eric IV
- Born: 1354
- Died: 21 June 1411 or 1412
- Issue more...: Eric V John IV; Albert, canon in Hildesheim; Magnus; Bernard II
- House: House of Ascania
- Father: Eric II of Saxe-Lauenburg
- Mother: Agnes of Holstein

Eric IV of Saxe-Lauenburg (1354 – 21 June 1411 or 1412) was a son of Eric II, Duke of Saxe-Lauenburg and Agnes of Holstein.

== Life ==
Eric II already involved his son Eric IV young in government affairs. Eric IV succeeded his father in 1368 as Duke of Saxe-Ratzeburg-Lauenburg.

Neighbouring territories (Prince-Archbishopric of Bremen, Hamburg, and Schauenburg and Holstein-Kiel) had been at feud with the Saxon dukes Eric II and his cousin Albert V since 1363. In 1378 Prince-Archbishop Albert II reconciled with Eric IV, who had married Albert's niece Sophia. Eric IV and Albert II signed a peace, concluding to settle future disputes – especially on the Saxon exclave Land of Hadeln, neighbouring the prince-archbishopric – without using violence.

Between 1392 and 1398 Eric IV carried out the constructions of the Stecknitz Canal, connecting via Elbe and Trave the North Sea with the Baltic Sea. This was the first European canal crossing a drainage divide, and was especially important for trade with the entire Baltic Rim.

In 1400 Eric IV confirmed Hamburg's purchase of Ritzebüttel from his local vassals Lappe. In 1394 Hamburg had conquered the fortress of Ritzebüttel in order to make it its stronghold to protect the estuary of the river Elbe.

In 1401 Eric IV inherited Saxe-Bergedorf-Mölln from his cousin of second degree Eric III. Eric IV reunited the two branch duchies into Saxe-Lauenburg and subsequently shared his reign in the reunited duchy with his sons Eric V and John. However, most of Saxe-Bergedorf-Mölln had been alienated, such as the Herrschaft of Mölln (sold to Lübeck in 1359 under a repurchase agreement) and the Herrschaft of Bergedorf, the Vierlande, half the Saxon Wood and Geesthacht, all of which Eric III had pawned to the city of Lübeck in 1370.

Eric III Duke of Saxe-Ratzeburg-Lauenburg had further entitled Lübeck to take possession of these areas, once he had deceased, until his heirs would repay the credit and thus redeem them and simultaneously exercise their right to repurchase Mölln, requiring altogether a total sum of 26,000 Lübeck marks. Still in 1401 Eric IV, supported by his sons Eric V and John, forcefully captured the pawned areas without any repayment, before Lübeck could take possession of them. Lübeck acquiesced. In 1407 Eric IV pawned the northern part of Hadeln to Hamburg, four years later the southern part to Bremen. In 1411 Eric IV and his sons Eric V and John IV pawned their share in the Vogtei over the Bailiwick of Bederkesa and in the Bederkesa Castle to the Senate of Bremen including all "they have in the jurisdictions in the Frisian Land of Wursten and in Lehe, which belongs to the afore-mentioned castle and Vogtei". Their share in jurisdiction, Vogtei and castle had been acquired from the plague-stricken Knights of Bederkesa, who had dropped into decline after 1349/1350.

== Marriage and issue ==
On 8 April 1373 Eric IV married Sophia of Brunswick-Lüneburg (1358–28 May 1416), daughter of Magnus II, Duke of Brunswick-Lüneburg. and they had the following children:

- Eric V (?–1436), duke of Saxe-Lauenburg
- John IV (?–1414), duke of Saxe-Lauenburg
- Albert (died 1421), canon in Hildesheim
- Magnus (died 1452), Prince-Bishop of Cammin 1410–1424, thereafter Prince-Bishop of Hildesheim
- Bernard II (died 1463), duke of Saxe-Lauenburg
- Otto (died before 1431)
- Agnes (died before 1415), on 23 March 1399 married with Albrecht II of Holstein-Rendsburg
- Agnes (died ca. 1435, Pudagla), married Wartislaw VIII, Duke of Pomerania
- Catherine (died before 1448), married (1) John VII of Werle (2) John IV, Duke of Mecklenburg
- Sophia (died 1462), married Wartislaw IX, Duke of Pomerania-Wolgast and mother of Eric II, Duke of Pomerania.

== Notes ==
Eric IV of Saxony, Angria and Westphalia House of Ascania Born: 1354 Died: 21 June 1411 or 1412
Regnal titles
| Preceded by Eric II as Duke of Saxe-Ratzeburg-Lauenburg | Duke of Saxe-Ratzeburg-Lauenburg; 1368–1401 | Merger of Saxe-Bergedorf-Mölln with Saxe-Ratzeburg-Lauenburg into Saxe-Lauenburg |
| Preceded by Eric IV as Duke of Saxe-Ratzeburg-Lauenburg | Dukes of Saxe-Lauenburg; 1401–1411/1412 with Eric V (son) (1401–1435); John IV (son) (1401–1412) | Succeeded by Eric V and John IV |
| Preceded by Eric III as Duke of Saxe-Bergedorf-Mölln | Dukes of Saxe-Lauenburg; 1401–1411/1412 with Eric V (son) (1401–1435); John IV (son) (1401–1412) | Succeeded by Eric V and John IV |
