= Zollenspieker Ferry =

Coordinates: 53.396138°N 10.178404°E

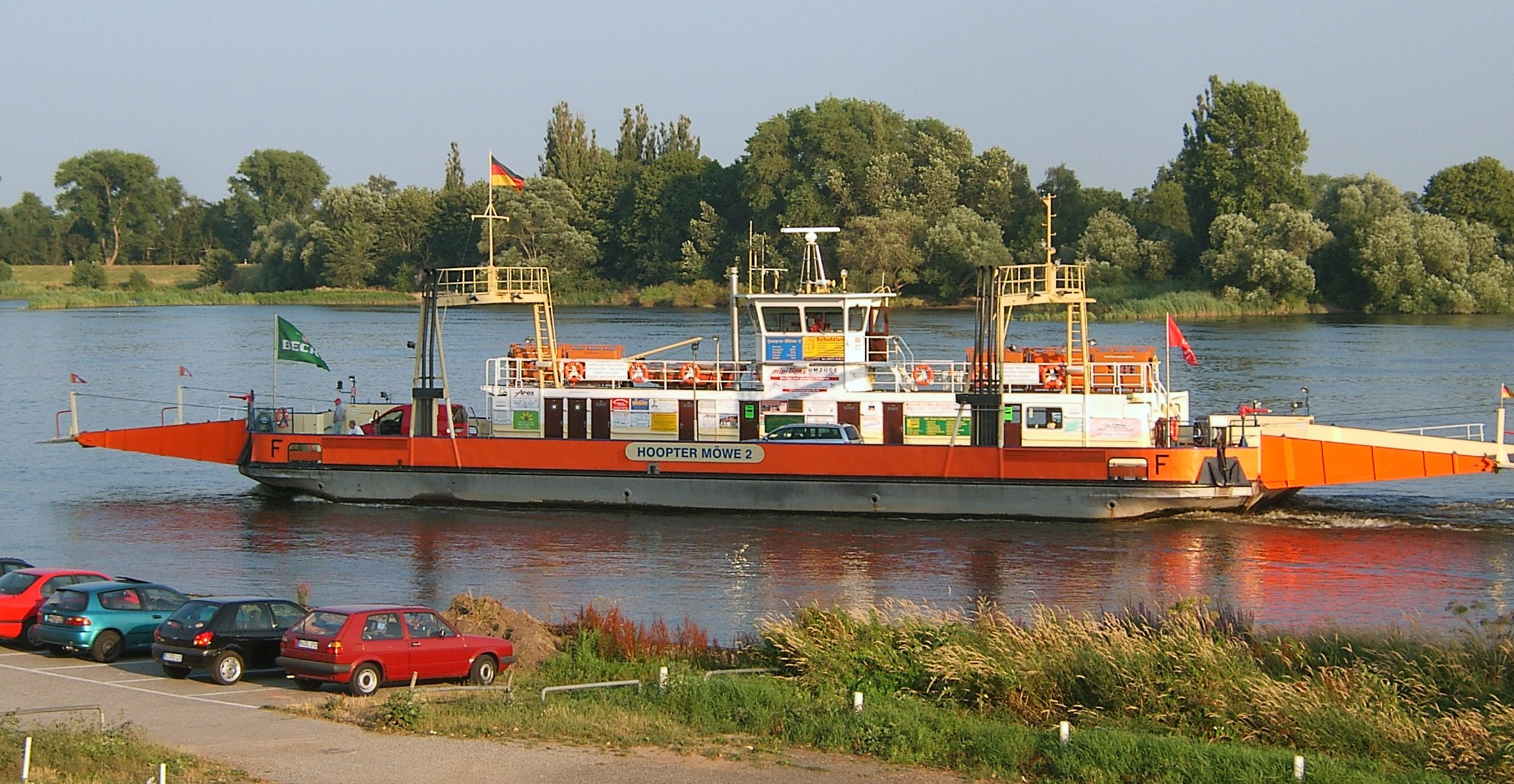
The Zollenspieker ferry.

The Zollenspieker Ferry is a ferry across the Elbe river (here Unterelbe) in Germany. It crosses between Zollenspieker, a part of the quarter Kirchwerder of the Bergedorf borough of the city-state of Hamburg, and Hoopte, part of the town Winsen (Luhe), in the state of Lower Saxony, and is about 30 kilometres (19 mi) south-east of Hamburg city centre.
