= Gunzelin VI of Schwerin =

Gunzelin VI, Count of Schwerin
- Died: 1327
- Noble family: Hagen
- Spouse: Richardis of Tecklenburg
- Father: Niklot I, Count of Schwerin
- Mother: Elisabeth of Holstein

Gunzelin VI of Schwerin (died: 1327) was a son of Count Niklot I of Schwerin and his wife, Elisabeth of Holstein. In 1323, he succeeded his father in Schwerin-Wittenburg.

He was married to Richardis of Tecklenburg, daughter of Count Otto IV of Tecklenburg. They had five children:

- Otto (d. 1357)
- Nicholas (d. 1367)
- Matilda, married Count Henning of Gützkow
- Beata, in 1334 married Albert IV, Duke of Saxe-Lauenburg
- Richardis (d. 1384), married Valdemar V, Duke of Schleswig

Gunzelin VI of Schwerin House of Schwerin Died: 1327
Preceded by Niklot I	Count of Schwerin; 1323-1327	Succeeded by Otto I
