= Agnes of Holstein =

German duchess (died 1386)

- Died: 1386
- Buried: Ratzeburg Cathedral
- Noble family: House of Schauenburg
- Spouse: Eric II, Duke of Saxe-Lauenburg
- Issue Detail: Eric IV, Duke of Saxe-Lauenburg
- Father: John III, Count of Holstein-Plön
- Mother: Catherine of Silesia-Glogau

Agnes of Holstein (died 1386) was a Countess of Holstein-Kiel by birth and by marriage a Duchess of Saxe-Lauenburg. She was the daughter of Count John III of Holstein-Plön (d. 1359) and Catherine (d. 1327), daughter of Duke Henry III of Silesia-Glogau.

She married Duke Eric II of Saxe-Lauenburg. She was noted for her bravery in her younger years, particularly for her willingness to travel through dangerous terrain without her husband while he was overseas.

In her old age, Agnes went blind and was devoted to her religion. She died in 1386 and was buried in the Cathedral in Ratzeburg.

== Marriages and descendants ==
On 22 March 1327 in Trittau, Agnes was engaged to marry Duke Eric II of Saxe-Lauenburg (d. 1368 or 1369). The wedding took place between 1342 and 1349. They had four children:

1. Eric IV (1354–1412), Duke of Saxe-Lauenburg
2. Agnes († after 1387), married to Duke William of Brunswick-Lüneburg (d. 1369)
3. Jutta (d. 1388), married to Duke Bogislaw VI of Pomerania (d. 1393)
4. Mechthild (died after 1405), Abbess of Wienhausen Abbey

She was an ancestor of Anne of Cleves.
