= Eric II of Saxe-Lauenburg =

Eric II
- Officially: Duke of Saxony, Angria and Westphalia; Colloquially: Duke of Saxe-Lauenburg or Duke of Saxe-Ratzeburg-Lauenburg

Duchy of Saxe-Ratzeburg-Lauenburg
- Reign: 1338 – 1368
- Predecessor: Eric I
- Successor: Eric IV
- Born: 1318
- Died: 1368 (aged 49–50)
- Spouse: Agnes of Holstein
- Issue Detail: Agnes, Duchess of Brunswick-Lüneburg; Eric IV; Jutta, Duchess of Pomerania-Wolgast; Matilda, abbess
- House: House of Ascania
- Father: Eric I, Duke of Saxe-Lauenburg
- Mother: Elisabeth of Pomerania
- Religion: Roman Catholic

Eric II of Saxe-Lauenburg (1318/1320 – 1368) was a son of Duke Eric I of Saxe-Lauenburg and Elisabeth of Pomerania (*1291–after 16 October 1349*), daughter of Bogislaw IV, Duke of Pomerania. Eric II succeeded his father, after his resignation in 1338, as duke of Saxe-Ratzeburg-Lauenburg, a branch duchy of Saxe-Lauenburg.

Eric II and his cousin Albert V of Saxe-Bergedorf-Mölln ravaged merchants and other travellers passing their duchies. In 1363 the city of Hamburg and Adolphus IX (aka VII) the Mild, Count of Schauenburg and Holstein-Kiel, supported by his relative Prince-Archbishop Albert II of Bremen, freed the streets northeast of the city from the brigandage by Eric II and Albert V, conquering the latter's castle in Bergedorf.

== Marriage and issue ==
In 1342 or 1343 Eric married Agnes of Holstein (?–1386/7), daughter of John III, Count of Holstein-Plön, and they had the following children:

- Agnes (1353–1387), married William II, Duke of Brunswick-Lüneburg in 1363
- Eric IV (1354–1411)
- Jutta (1360–1388) married Bogislaw VI, Duke of Pomerania (1350–1393).
- Matilda (Mechthild) (? – after 1405), abbess of Wienhausen Abbey

== Ancestry ==
Ancestors of Eric II of Saxe-Lauenburg

8. Albert I, Duke of Saxony (=#30)
4. John I, Duke of Saxony
9. Helene of Brunswick-Lüneburg
2. Eric I, Duke of Saxe-Lauenburg
10. Birger Jarl
5. Ingeborg Birgersdotter of Småland
11. Ingeborg Eriksdotter of Sweden
1. Eric II, Duke of Saxe-Lauenburg
12. Barnim I, Duke of Pomerania
6. Bogislaw IV, Duke of Pomerania
13. Marianne
3. Elisabeth of Pomerania
14. John I, Margrave of Brandenburg
7. Matilda of Brandenburg
15. Bridget (Jutta) of Saxony

== Notes ==
Eric II of Saxe-Lauenburg House of Ascania Born: 1318/1320 Died: 1368
Regnal titles
Preceded by Eric I	Duke of Saxe-Ratzeburg-Lauenburg; 1338 – 1368	Succeeded by Eric IV
