= List of state leaders in the 14th-century Holy Roman Empire =

This is a list of state leaders in the 14th century (1301–1400) AD, of the Holy Roman Empire.

== Main ==
Holy Roman Empire in Germany

- Holy Roman Empire, Kingdom of Germany (complete list, complete list) –

- Albert I, King (1298–1308)
- Henry VII, Holy Roman Emperor (1312–1313), King (1308–1313)
- Frederick the Fair, King (1314–1330)
- Louis IV, Holy Roman Emperor (1328–1347), King (1314–1347)
- Charles IV, Holy Roman Emperor (1355–1378), King (1346–1378)
- Wenceslaus, King (1376–1400)
- Rupert, King (1400–1410)

== Austrian ==
- Duchy of Austria (complete list) –

- Albert I, Duke (1282–1308)
- Rudolf III the Good, Duke (1298–1307)
- Frederick I the Fair, Duke (1308–1330)
- Leopold I the Glorious, Duke (1308–1326)
- Albert II the Wise, Duke (1330–1358)
- Otto I the Merry, Duke (1330–1339)
- Frederick II, Duke (1339–1344)
- Leopold II, Duke (1339–1344)
- Rudolf IV the Founder, Duke (1358–1365)
- Leopold III the Just, Duke (1365–1379)
- Albert III the Pigtail, Duke (1365–1395)
- Albert IV the Patient, Duke (1395–1404)

- Prince-Bishopric of Brixen (complete list) –

- Konrad Waldner, Prince-bishop (1301)
- Arnold, Prince-bishop (1302)
- Johann Sax of Saxenau, Prince-bishop (1302–1306)
- Johann Wulfing of Schlackenwerth, Prince-bishop (1306–1322)
- Ulrich of Schlüsselberg, Prince-bishop (1322–1322)
- Konrad of Klingenberg, Prince-bishop (1322–1324)
- Albert I of Enn, Prince-bishop (1324–1336)
- Matthew of Gassen, Prince-bishop (1336–1363)
- Lamprecht of Brunn, Prince-bishop (1363–1364)
- Johann Ribi of Lenzburg, Prince-bishop (1364–1374)
- Albert II of Enn, Prince-bishop (1374–1376)
- Friedrich of Erdingen, Prince-bishop (1376–1396)
- Ulrich Prustl, Prince-bishop (1396–1417)

- Duchy of Carinthia (complete list) –

- Louis, co-Duke (1295–1305)
- Otto III, co-Duke (1295–1310)
- Henry VI, Duke (1295–1335)
- Otto IV, co-Duke (1335–1339)
- Albert II, Duke (1335–1358)
- Frederick, co-Duke (1358–1362)
- Rudolph II, co-Duke (1358–1365)
- Albert III, Duke (1365–1379)
- Leopold, Duke (1379–1386)
- William, Duke (1386–1406)

- Prince-Bishopric of Chur (complete list) –

- Siegfried von Gelnhausen, Prince-bishop (1298–1321)
- Rudolf III. von Montfort, Prince-bishop (1322–1325)
- Johannes I. Pfefferhard, Prince-bishop (1325–1331)
- Ulrich V. von Lenzburg, Prince-bishop (1331–1355)
- Peter I. Gelyto, Prince-bishop (1356–1368)
- Friedrich II. von Erdingen, Prince-bishop (1368–1376)
- Johannes II. Ammann (Ministri), Prince-bishop (1376–1388)
- Hartmann II. Graf von Werdenberg-Sargans, Prince-bishop (1388–1416)

- County of Gorizia (complete list) –

- Albert I, Count (1258–1304)
- Henry III, Count (1304–1323)
- John Henry IV, Count (1323–1338)
- Albert III, Count (1338–1374)
- Meinhard VI, Count (1338–1385)
- Henry V, Count (1338–1362)
- Henry VI, Count (1385–1454)

- Prince-Archbishopric of Salzburg (complete list) –

- Conrad IV of Breitenfurt, Prince-archbishop (1291–1312)
- Weichard of Pollheim, Prince-archbishop (1312–1315)
- Frederick III of Leibnitz, Prince-archbishop (1315–1338)
- Henry of Pirnbrunn, Prince-archbishop (1338–1343)
- Ordulf of Wiesseneck, Prince-archbishop (1343–1365)
- Pilgrim II of Pucheim, Prince-archbishop (1365–1396)
- Gregor Schenk of Osterwitz, Prince-archbishop (1396–1403)

- Duchy of Styria (complete list) –

- Albert I, Duke (1282–1308)
- Rudolph II, Duke (1282–1283)
- Rudolph III, Duke (1298–1307)
- Leopold I, Duke (1308–1326)
- Frederick the Fair, Duke (1308–1330)
- Otto the Merry, Duke (1330–1339)
- Albert II, Duke (1330–1358)
- Rudolph IV, Duke (1358–1365)
- Albert III, Duke (1365–1379)
- Leopold III, Duke (1365–1386)
- William, Duke (1386–1406)

- Prince-Bishopric of Trent (complete list) –

- Philipp Buonacolsi, Prince-bishop (1289–1303)
- Bartholomew Querini, Prince-bishop (1303–1307)
- Henry III von Metz, Prince-bishop (1310–1336)
- Nikolaus Abrein, Prince-bishop (1338–1347)
- Gerard II of Magnoco, Prince-bishop (1347–1348)
- John III of Pistoia, Prince-bishop (1348–1349)
- Meinhard von Neuhaus, Prince-bishop (1349–1362)
- Albert V von Ortenburg, Prince-bishop (1363–1390)
- George I von Liechtenstein, Prince-bishop (1390–1419)

- County of Tyrol (complete list) –

- Louis of Gorizia-Tyrol, co-Count (1295–1305)
- Otto, co-Count (1295–1310)
- Henry II, Count (1295–1335)
- Margaret, Countess (1335–1363)
- John Henry, Count (1335–1341)
- Louis, Count (1341–1361)
- Meinhard III, Count (1361–1363)
- Rudolph IV, Count (1363–1365)
- Leopold I, Count (1365–1386)
- Albert IV, co-Count (1365–1379, 1386–1395)
- William, Count (1386–1406)
- Leopold II, Regent (1396–1406)

== Bavarian ==
- Duchy of Bavaria (complete list) –

- Upper Bavaria, Lower Bavaria, Bavaria-Landshut, Bavaria-Straubing, Bavaria-Munich, Bavaria-Ingolstadt

- Stephen I, co-Duke of Lower Bavaria (1290–1310)
- Otto III, co-Duke of Lower Bavaria (1290–1312)
- Matilda, Regent of Upper Bavaria (1294–1302)
- Rudolph I, Duke of Upper Bavaria (1294–1317)
- Henry XV the Natternberger, co-Duke of Lower Bavaria (1312–1333)
- Otto VI, co-Duke of Lower Bavaria (1310–1334)
- Henry XIV, co-Duke of Lower Bavaria (1310–1339)
- John I the Child, Duke of Lower Bavaria (1339–1340)
- Louis IV, Duke of Upper Bavaria (1301–1340), Duke of Bavaria (1340–1347)
- Otto V, co-Duke of Bavaria (1347–1949), of Upper Bavaria (1349–1351), of Bavaria-Landshut (1373–1379)
- Louis V the Brandenburger, co-Duke of Bavaria (1347–1349), of Upper Bavaria (1349–1361)
- Meinhard I, Duke of Upper Bavaria (1361–1363)
- Louis VI, co-Duke of Bavaria (1347–1365)
- Stephen II, co-Duke of Bavaria (1347–1349), of Lower Bavaria (1349–1353), of Bavaria-Landshut (1353–1375), of Upper Bavaria (1363)
- William I, co-Duke of Bavaria (1347–1349), of Lower Bavaria (1349–1353), of Bavaria-Straubing (1353–1388)
- Ernest, co-Duke of Bavaria-Munich (1397–1438), of Bavaria-Straubing (1429–1438)
- Albert I, co-Duke of Bavaria (1347–1349), of Lower Bavaria (1349–1353), of Bavaria-Straubing (1353–1404)
- Albert II, co-Duke of Bavaria-Straubing (1389–1397)
- Frederick I the Wise, co-Duke of Bavaria except Straubing (1375–1392), Duke of Bavaria-Landshut (1392–1393)
- John II, co-Duke of Bavaria except Straubing (1375–1392), Duke of Bavaria-Munich (1392–1397)
- Stephen III the Magnificent, co-Duke of Bavaria except Straubing (1375–1392), Duke of Bavaria-Ingolstadt (1392–1413)
- Henry XVI the Rich, Duke of Bavaria-Landshut (1393–1450), of Bavaria-Ingolstadt (1447–1450)

- Berchtesgaden Prince-Provostry (complete list) –

- Johann I Sachs von Sachsenau, Provost (1283–1303)
- Hartung von Wildon, Provost (1303–1306)
- Eberhard Sachs von Sachsenau, Provost (1306–1316)
- Konrad IV Tanner, Provost (1316–1333)
- Heinrich IV von Inzing, Provost (1333–1351)
- Reinhold Zeller, Provost (1351–1355)
- Otto Tanner, Provost (1355–1357)
- Peter I Pfaffinger, Provost (1357–1362)
- Jakob I von Vansdorf, Provost (1362–1368)
- Greimold Wulp, Provost (1368–1377)
- Ulrich I Wulp, co-Provost (1377–1384)
- Sieghard Waller, co-Provost (1381–1384)
- Konrad V Thorer von Thörlein, Provost (1384–1393)
- Pilgrim von Puchheim, Provost (1393–1396)
- Gregorius Schenk von Osterwitz, Provost (1396–1403)

- Prince-Bishopric of Freising (complete list) –

- Waldgrave Emicho, Prince-bishop (1294–1311)
- Gottfried of Hexenagger, Prince-bishop (1311–1314)
- Conrad III the Sendlinger, Prince-bishop (1314–1322)
- John I Wulfing, Prince-bishop (1323–1324)
- Conrad IV of Klingenberg, Prince-bishop (1324–1340)
- John II Hake, Prince-bishop (1340–1349)
- Albert II of Hohenberg, Prince-bishop (1349–1359)
- Paul of Jägerndorf, Prince-bishop (1359–1377)
- Leopold of Sturmberg, Prince-bishop (1377–1381)
- Berthold of Wehingen, Prince-bishop (1381–1410)

- Landgraviate of Leuchtenberg (de:complete list) –

- Ulrich I. (Leuchtenberg), Landgrave (1293–1334)
- Ulrich II, Landgrave (1344–1378)
- John I, Landgrave (1334–1407)
- Albrecht I, Landgrave (1378–1404)

- Duchy of Limburg (complete list) –

- John II, Duke (1294–1312)
- John III, Duke (1312–1355)
- Joanna, Duchess (1355–1406)

- Prince-Abbey of Niedermünster (complete list) –

- Adelheid II von Treidenberg, Abbess (1300–1304)
- Irmgard II von Köfering, Abbess (1304–1314)
- Euphemia von Winzer, Abbess (1314–1333)
- Elisabeth II von Eschen, Abbess (1333–1340)
- Petrissa von Weidenberg, Abbess (1340–1353)
- Margarethe I Gösslin von Altenburg, Abbess (1353–1361)
- Margarethe II Pinzingerin, Abbess (1361–1365)
- Elisabeth III von Rhein, Abbess (1365–1391)
- Sophia von Daching, Abbess (1391–1410)

- Prince-Abbey of Obermünster (complete list) –

- Bertha Walterin, Abbess (?–1325)
- Adelheid von Arenbach, Abbess (?)
- Katharina von Murach, Abbess (?)
- Agnes I von Wunebach, Abbess (?–1374)
- Elisabeth I von Parsberg, Abbess (1374–1400)
- Elisabeth II von Murach, Abbess (1400–1402)

- Imperial County of Ortenburg (complete list) –

- Henry III, Count (1297/1321–1345)
- Henry IV, Count (1346–1395)
- George I, Count of Neu-Ortenburg (1395–1422), Imperial Count (1395–1422)

- Prince-Bishopric of Passau (complete list) –

- Bernhard of Prambach, Prince-Bishop (1285–1313)
- Albert II, Duke of Austria, Prince-Bishop (1313)
- Gebhard II, Prince-Bishop (1313–1315)
- Henri de la Tour-du-Pin, Prince-Bishop (1317–1319)
- Albert II of Saxe-Wittenberg, Prince-Bishop (1320–1342)
- Gottfried of Weißeneck, Prince-Bishop (1342–1362)
- Albert III of Winkel, Prince-Bishop (1363–1380)
- Johann of Scharffenberg, Prince-Bishop (1381–1387)
- Hermann Digni, Prince-Bishop (1387–1388)
- Rupert of Berg, Prince-Bishop (1388–1390)
- George of Hohenlohe, Prince-Bishop (1390–1423)

- Pappenheim (complete list) –

- Henry IV, Lord (1278–1318)
- Rudolph I, Lord (1313–1335)
- Rudolph II, Lord (1335–1345)
- Henry V, Lord (1345–1387)
- Haupt I, Lord (1387–1409)

- Prince-Bishopric of Regensburg (complete list) –

- Konrad V von Luppurg, Prince-bishop (1296–1313)
- Nikolaus von Ybbs, Prince-bishop (1313–1340)
- Friedrich von Zollern-Nürnberg, Prince-bishop (1340–1365)
- Heinrich III von Stein, Prince-bishop (1365–1368)
- Konrad VI von Haimberg, Prince-bishop (1368–1381)
- Theoderich von Abensberg, Prince-bishop (1381–1383)
- Johann von Moosburg, Prince-bishop (1384–1409)

== Bohemian ==
- Kingdom of Bohemia (complete list) –

- Wenceslaus II, King (1278–1305)
- Wenceslaus III, King (1305–1306)
- Henry the Carinthian, King (1306, 1307–1310)
- Rudolph I, King (1306–1307)
- John the Blind, King (1310–1346)
- Charles IV, King (1346–1378)
- Wenceslaus IV, King (1378–1419)

- Margraviate of Moravia (complete list) –

- Wenceslaus II, Margrave (1283–1305)
- Wenceslaus III, Margrave (1305–1306)
- Rudolf I of Habsburg, Margrave (1306–1307)
- Henry of Carinthia, Margrave (1307–1310)
- John, Margrave (1310–1333)
- Charles, Margrave (1333–1349)
- John Henry, Margrave (1349–1375)
- Jobst of Moravia, Margrave (1375–1411)

- Duchy of Teschen (Cieszyn) (complete list) –

- Mieszko I, Duke (1290–1315)
- Casimir I, Duke (1315–1358)
- Przemyslaus I Noszak, Duke (1358–1410)

== Burgundian-Low Countries ==
- County of Burgundy (complete list) –

- Otto IV, Count (1279–1303)
- Joan II, Countess (1303–1330)
- Philip II the Tall, Count (1307–1322)
- Joan III, Countess, and Odo V, Count (1330–1347)
- Philip III of Rouvres, Count (1347–1361)
- Margaret I, Countess (1361–1382)
- Louis I of Mâle, Count (1382–1384)
- Margaret II of Dampierre, Count (1384–1405)

- Duchy of Brabant (complete list) –

- John II, Duke (1294–1312)
- John III, Duke (1312–1355)
- Joanna, Duchess (1355–1406)

- County of Flanders (complete list) –

- Guy I, Count (1251–1305)
- Robert III, Count (1305–1322)
- Louis I, Count (1322–1346)
- Louis II, Count (1346–1384)
- Margaret III, Countess, and Philip II, Count (1384–1405)

- County of Hainaut (complete list) –

- John II, Count (1280–1304)
- William I, Count (1304–1337)
- William II, Count (1337–1345)
- Margaret II, Countess (1345–1356) with Louis (1345–1347)
- William III, Count (1356–1388)
- Albert I, Count (1388–1404)

- County of Holland (complete list) –

- John II, Count of Hainaut, Regent (1299), Count (1299–1304)
- William III, Count (1304–1337)
- William IV the Bold, Count (1337–1345)
- Margaret I, Count (1345–1354)
- Louis the Bavarian, Count (1345–1347)
- William V, Count (1354–1388)
- Albert I, Count (1388–1404)

- Duchy of Limburg (complete list) –

- John II, Duke (1294–1312)
- John III, Duke (1312–1355)
- Joanna, Duchess (1355–1406)

- County of Namur (complete list) –

- John I, Margrave (1297–1330)
- John II, Margrave (1330–1335)
- Guy II, Margrave (1335–1336)
- Philip III, Margrave (1336–1337)
- William I, Margrave (1337–1391)
- William II, Margrave (1391–1418)

== Franconian ==
- Prince-Bishopric of Bamberg (complete list) –

- Leopold I von Grundlach, Prince-bishop (1296–1303)
- Wulfing von Stubenberg, Prince-bishop (1304–1318)
- Ulrich von Schlusselberg, Prince-bishop (1319)
- Konrad von Giech, Prince-bishop (1319–1322)
- Johannes von Schlackenwerth, Prince-bishop (1322–1324)
- Heinrich II von Sternberg, Prince-bishop (1324–1328)
- Werntho Schenk von Reicheneck, Prince-bishop (1328–1335)
- Leopold II von Egloffstein, Prince-bishop (1335–1343)
- Friedrich I von Hohenlohe, Prince-bishop (1344–1352)
- Leopold III of Bebenburg, Prince-bishop (1353–1363)
- Friedrich II von Truhendingen, Prince-bishop (1363–1366)
- Louis of Meissen, Prince-bishop (1366–1374)
- Lamprecht von Brunn, Prince-bishop (1374–1399)
- Albrecht von Wertheim, Prince-bishop (1399–1421)

- Brandenburg-Kulmbach (Brandenburg-Bayreuth) (complete list) –

- John III, Margrave (1398–1420)

- Brandenburg-Ansbach (complete list) –

- Frederick I, Elector (1415–1440), Margrave of Brandenburg-Ansbach (1398–1440), of Brandenburg-Kulmbach (1420–1440)

- County of Castell, Elder Line (complete list) –

- Henry II, Count (1254–1307)
- Rupert II, Count (1307–1334)
- Henry III, Count (1334–1347)

- County of Castell, Younger Line (complete list) –

- Frederick IV Count of Younger Line (1285–1347), Count (1347–1349)

- County of Castell (complete list) –

- Frederick IV Count of Younger Line (1285–1347), Count (1347–1349)
- Herman IV, Count (1349–1363)
- Frederick VII, Count (1349–1376)
- John I, Count (1363–1384)
- William I, Count (1363–1399)
- Leonard, Count (1399–1426)

- Prince-Bishopric of Eichstätt (complete list, de) –

- Johann I von Durbheim, Prince-bishop (1305–1306)
- Philipp von Rathsamhausen, Prince-bishop (1306–1322)
- Marquard I von Hageln, Prince-bishop (1322–1324)
- Gebhard III von Graisbacch, Prince-bishop (1324–1327)
- Friedrich III von Leuchtenberg, Prince-bishop (1328–1329)
- Heinrich V Schenk von Reicheneck, Prince-bishop (1329–1344)
- Albrecht I von Hohenfels, Prince-bishop (1344–1353)
- Berthold von Nürnberg, Prince-bishop (1355–1365)
- Rhabanus Schenk von Wildburgstetten, Prince-bishop (1365–1383)
- Frederick IV of Oettingen, Prince-bishop (1383–1415)

- Prince-Bishopric of Würzburg (complete list) –

- Mangold von Neuenburg, Prince-bishop (1287–1303)
- Andreas von Gundelfingen, Prince-bishop (1303–1313)
- Gottfried III von Hohenlohe, Prince-bishop (1313–1322)
- Friedrich von Stolberg, Prince-bishop (1313–1317)
- Wolfram Wolfskeel von Grumbach, Prince-bishop (1322–1332)
- Hermann II Hummel von Lichtenberg, Prince-bishop (1333–1335)
- Otto II von Wolfskeel, Prince-bishop (1335–1345)
- Albrecht I von Hohenberg, Prince-bishop (1345–1349)
- Albrecht II von Hohenlohe, Prince-bishop (1350–1372)
- Albrecht III von Katzburg, Prince-bishop (1372–1376)
- Gerhard von Schwarzburg, Prince-bishop (1372–1400)
- Johann I von Egloffstein, Prince-bishop (1400–1411)

== Electoral Rhenish ==
- Elector-Archbishopric of Cologne (complete list) –

- Wikbold I von Holte, Archbishop-elector (1297–1304)
- Heinrich II von Virneburg, Archbishop-elector (1304–1332)
- Walram von Jülich, Archbishop-elector (1332–1349)
- Wilhelm von Gennep, Archbishop-elector (1349–1362)
- Adolf II von der Marck, Archbishop-elector (1363–1363)
- Engelbert III von der Marck, Archbishop-elector (1364–1369)
- Kuno von Falkenstein, Archbishop-elector (1370–1371)
- Friedrich III von Saarwerden, Archbishop-elector (1372–1414)

- Elector-Bishopric of Mainz (complete list) –

- Peter of Aspelt, Archbishop-elector (1306–1320)
- Matthias von Bucheck, Archbishop-elector (1321–1328)
- Heinrich III von Virneberg, Archbishop-elector (1328–1337)
- Baldwin of Luxembourg, Administrator-elector (1328–1336, administrator)
- Gerlach von Nassau, Archbishop-elector (1346–1371)
- Johann I von Luxemburg-Ligny, Archbishop-elector (1371–1373)
- Louis of Meissen, Archbishop-elector (1374–1379)
- Adolf I von Nassau, Archbishop-elector (1379–1390)
- Konrad II von Weinsberg, Archbishop-elector (1390–1396)
- Joffrid von Leiningen, Archbishop-elector (1396–1397)
- Johann II von Nassau, Archbishop-elector (1397–1419)

- Nieder-Isenburg (Lower Isenburg) (complete list) –

- Salentin II, Count (1300–1334)
- Salentin III, Count (1319–1370)
- Salentin IV, Count (1370–1420)

- County Palatine of the Rhine/ Electoral Palatinate (complete list) –

- Rudolph I the Stammerer, Count (1296–1317)
- Rudolph II the Blind, Count (1327–1353)
- Robert I the Red, Count (1353–1356), Elector (1356–1390)
- Robert II the Hard, Elector (1390–1398)
- Robert III the Righteous, Elector (1398–1410)

- Elector-Bishopric of Trier (complete list) –

- Diether von Nassau, Archbishop-elector (1300–1307)
- Heinrich II von Virneburg, Archbishop-elector (1300–1306, in opposition)
- Baldwin von Luxemburg, Archbishop-elector (1307–1354)
- Bohemond II von Saarbrücken, Archbishop-elector (1354–1361)
- Kuno II von Falkenstein, Archbishop-elector (1362–1388)
- Werner von Falkenstein, Archbishop-elector (1388–1417)

== Lower Rhenish–Westphalian ==
- Bentheim-Bentheim (complete list) –

- Egbert, Count (1277–1305)
- John, Count (1305–1333)
- Simon, Count (1333–1348)
- Otto III, Count (1348–1364)
- Bernard I, Count (1364–1421)

- Bentheim-Tecklenburg (complete list) –

- Otto III, Count (1277–1338)
- Otto IV, Count (1289–1302)
- Otto V, Count (1302–1328)
- Richardis, Count (1328–1338)
- Nicholas I, Count (1338–1360)
- Otto VI, Count (1360–1388)
- Nicholas II, Count (1388–1426)

- County/ Duchy of Cleves (complete list) –

- Dietrich VII of Meissen, Count (1275–1305)
- Otto I the Peaceable, Count (1305–1310)
- Dietrich VIII the Pious, Count (1310–1347)
- Johann, Count (1347–1368)
- Adolf III of the Marck, Count (1368–1394)
- Adolph I, Duke (1394–1448)

- Princely Abbey of Corvey (de:complete list) –

- Heinrich III. von Homburg, Prince-abbot (1275–1306)
- Ruprecht von Horhausen, Prince-abbot (1306–1336)
- Dietrich I von Dalwigk, Prince-abbot (1336–1359)
- Heinrich IV of Spiegel zum Desenberg, Prince-abbot (1359–1360)
- Reinhard I von Dalwigk, Prince-abbot (1360–1369)
- Ernst of Braunschweig-Grubenhagen, Prince-abbot (1369–1371)
- Bodo von Pyrmont, Prince-abbot (1371–1395)
- Dietrich II von Runst, Prince-abbot (1395–1396)
- Arnold II Wolff von Gudenberg, Prince-abbot (1396–1398)
- Wilbrand of Hallermund, Prince-abbot (1398–1408)

- Essen Abbey (complete list) –

- Beatrix von Holte, Princess-Abbess (1292–1327)
- Kunigunde of Berg, Princess-Abbess (1327–1337)
- Katharina of the Mark, Princess-Abbess (1337–1360)
- Irmgard of Broich, Princess-Abbess (1360–1370)
- Elisabeth III of Nassau, Princess-Abbess (1370–?)

- County/ Duchy of Guelders (complete list) –

- Reginald I, Count (1271–1318)
- Reginald II, Count (1318–1339), Duke (1339–1343)
- Eleanor, Regent (1343–1344)
- Reginald III, Duke (1343–1361, 1371)
- Edward, Duke (1361–1371)
- Mathilde of Guelders and John II, disputed the succession (1371–1379)
- Maria and William II, Duke of Jülich, disputed the succession (1371–1379)
- William I, Duke (1379–1402)

- Herford Abbey (complete list) –

- Irmgard of Wittgenstein, Abbess (pre-1290–1323)
- Lutgard II of Bicken, Abbess (1324–1360)
- Heilwig of Bentheim, Abbess (1361)
- Elisabeth I of Berg, Abbess (1361–1374)
- Hillegund of Oetgenbach, Abbess (1374–1409)

- Isenburg-Wied –

- William II, Count of Isenburg-Braunsberg (1383–1388), of Isenburg-Wied (1388–1409)

- Prince-Bishopric of Liège (complete list) –

- Hugh of Chalon, Prince-Bishop (1295–1301)
- Adolph of Waldeck, Prince-Bishop (1301–1302)
- Thibaut of Bar, Prince-Bishop (1302–1312)
- Adolph of La Marck, Prince-Bishop (1313–1344)
- Englebert of La Marck, Prince-Bishop (1345–1364)
- John of Arkel, Prince-Bishop (1364–1378)
- Arnold of Horne, Prince-Bishop (1378–1389)
- John of Bavaria, Prince-Bishop (1389–1418)

- County/ Duchy of Luxemburg (complete list) –

- Henry VII, Count (1288–1313)
- John I, Count (1313–1346)
- Charles I, Count (1346–1353)
- Wenceslaus I, Count (1353–1354), Duke (1354–1383)
- Wenceslaus II, Duke (1383–1388)
- Jobst, Duke (1388–1411)

- County of Mark (complete list) –

- Eberhard II, Count (1277–1308)
- Engelbert II, Count (1308–1328)
- Adolph II, Count (1328–1347)
- Engelbert III, Count (1347–1391)
- Adolph III, Count (1391–1393)
- Dietrich, Count (1393–1398)
- Adolph IV, Count (1398–1448)

- Prince-Bishopric of Münster (complete list) –

- Everhard of Diest, Prince-bishop (1275–1301)
- Otto III of Rietberg, Prince-bishop (1301–1306)
- Conrad I of Berg, Prince-bishop (1306–1310)
- Ludwig II of Hesse, Prince-bishop (1310–1357)
- Adolf III of the March, Prince-bishop (1357–1363)
- John I of Virneburg, Prince-bishop (1363–1364)
- Florence of Wevelinghoven, Prince-bishop (1364–1378)
- Potho of Pothenstein, Prince-bishop (1379–1382)
- Heidenreich Wolf of Lüdinghausen, Prince-bishop (1382–1392)
- Otto IV of Hoya, Prince-bishop (1392–1424)

- County of Oldenburg (complete list) –

- Otto II, Count of Oldenburg-Delmenhorst, Count (1272–1301)
- John II, Count (1278–1305)
- Christian IV, Count (1302–1323)
- John III, Count (1305–1345)
- John IV, Count (1331–1356)
- Conrad I, Count (1345–1368)
- Conrad II, Count (1368–1386)
- Maurice II, Count (1386–1420)
- Christian V, Count (1368–1398)
- Christian VI, Count (1398–1423)

- Prince-Bishopric of Osnabrück (complete list) –

- Ludwig von Ravensberg, Prince-bishop (1297–1308)
- Engelbert II von Weyhe, Prince-bishop (1309–1320)
- Gottfried von Arnsberg, Prince-bishop (1321–1349)
- Johann II Hoet, Prince-bishop (1350–1366)
- Melchior von Braunschweig-Grubenhagen, Prince-bishop (1366–1376)
- Dietrich of Horne, Prince-bishop (1376–1402)

- Prince-Bishopric of Paderborn (complete list) –

- Bernhard V, Prince-bishop (1321–1341)
- Baldwin of Steinfurt, Prince-bishop (1341–1361)
- Heinrich von Spiegel zum Desenberg, Prince-bishop (1361–1380)
- Simon II, Bishop of Paderborn, Prince-bishop (1380–1389)
- Rupert of Berg, Prince-bishop (1389–1394)
- John I, Bishop of Paderborn, Prince-bishop (1394–1399)
- Bertrando d'Arvazzano, Prince-bishop (1399–1401)

- County of Runkel (complete list) –

- Theodoric II, Count (1305–1325)
- Henry, Count (1351–1361)
- Theodoric III, Count (1370–1403)
- Siegfried, co-Count (1375–1388)

- Sayn (complete list) –

- John I, Count (1283–1324)
- John II, Count (1324–1359)
- John III, Count (1359–1403)

- County of Schaumburg (complete list) –

- Adolph VI the Elder, Count (1290–1315)
- Adolf VII, Count (1315–1354)
- Adolf VIII, Count (1354–1370)
- Otto I, Count (1370–1404)

- Prince-Bishopric of Utrecht (complete list) –

- Willem II Berthout, Prince-bishop (1296–1301)
- Guy van Avennes, Prince-bishop (1301–1317)
- Frederik II van Sierck, Prince-bishop (1317–1322)
- Jacob van Oudshoorn, Prince-bishop (1322)
- Jan III van Diest, Prince-bishop (1322–1340)
- Jan IV van Arkel (1342–1364)
- Jan V van Virneburg, Prince-bishop (1364–1371)
- Arnold II of Horne, Prince-bishop (1371–1379)
- Floris van Wevelinkhoven, Prince-bishop (1379–1393)
- Frederik III van Blankenheim, Prince-bishop (1393–1423)

- Prince-Bishopric of Verden (complete list) –

- Nicolaus Ketelhot, Prince-Bishop (1312–1332)
- Johannes Hake, Prince-Bishop (1332–1340)
- Daniel of Wichtrich, Prince-Bishop (1342–1363)
- Gerard of Schalksberg, Prince-Bishop (1363–1365)
- Rudolf Rühle, Prince-Bishop (1365–1367)
- Henry of Langlingen, Prince-Bishop (1367–1381)
- John Gryse of Zesterfleth, Prince-Bishop (1381–1388)
- Otto of Brunswick and Lunenburg (Wolfenbüttel), Prince-Bishop (1388–1395)
- Dietrich of Nieheim, Prince-Bishop (1395–1398/1401)
- Conrad of Vechta, Prince-Bishop (1398–1399)
- Conrad of Soltau, Prince-Bishop (1399–1400, 1402–1407)

== Upper Rhenish ==
- County/ Duchy of Bar (complete list) –

- Henry III, Count (1291–1302)
- Edward I, Count (1302–1337)
- Henry IV, Count (1337–1344)
- Edward II, Count (1344–1352)
- Robert, Duke (1352–1411)

- Prince-Bishopric of Basel (complete list) –

- Peter von Aspelt, Prince-bishop (1297–1306)
- Eudes de Granson, Prince-bishop (1306–1309)
- Gerhard von Wippingen, Prince-bishop (1309–1325)
- Hartung Münch, Prince-bishop (1325–1332)
- Jean I Arley, Prince-bishop (1332–1335)
- Johann II of Munsingen, Prince-bishop (1335–1365)
- Jean III de Vienne, Prince-bishop (1365–1382)
- Imer von Ramstein, Prince-bishop (1382–1391)
- Frederick of Blankenheim, Prince-bishop (1391–1393)
- Konrad Munch von Landskron, Prince-bishop (1393–1395)
- Humbrecht von Neuenburg, Prince-bishop (1399–1418)

- Free City of Frankfurt (de:complete list) –

- Rudolf III. von Praunheim, Stadtschultheißen (1376–1379)
- Winter von Wasen, Stadtschultheißen (?–1389)
- Rudolf III. von Praunheim-Sachsenhausen, Stadtschultheißen (1389–1408)

- Princely Abbey of Fulda (complete list) –

- Heinrich V. Graf von Weilnau, Prince-abbot (1288–1313)
- Eberhard von Rotenstein, Prince-abbot (1313–1315)
- Heinrich VI. von Hohenberg, Prince-abbot (1315–1353)
- Heinrich VII. von Kranlucken, Prince-abbot (1353–1372)
- Konrad IV. von Hanau, Prince-abbot (1372–1383)
- Friedrich I. von Romrod, Prince-abbot (1383–1395)
- Johann I. von Merlau, Prince-abbot (1395–1440)

- Landgraviate of Hesse (complete list) –

- Henry I the Child, Landgrave (1264–1308)
- John I, Landgrave of Lower Hesse (1308–1311)
- Otto I the Elder, Landgrave of Upper Hesse (1308–1311), of Hesse (1311–1328)
- Henry II the Iron, co-Landgrave (1328–1376)
- Louis I the Junker, co-Landgrave (1336–1345)
- de:Herman I the Elder, co-Landgrave (1336–1370)
- de:Otto II the Younger, co-Landgrave (1336–1366)
- Herman II the Learned, Landgrave (1376–1413)

- Isenburg-Arnfels (complete list) –

- Gerlach I, Count (1286–1303)
- Theodoric, Count (1303–1333)
- John, Count (1305–1319)
- Gerlach II, Count (1333–1379)

- Isenburg-Braunsberg (complete list) –

- John I, Count (1278–1327)
- William I, Count (1327–1383)
- William II, Count (1383–1388)

- Isenburg-Covern (complete list) –

- Robin, Count (1272–1306)

- Isenburg-Grenzau (complete list) –

- Philip I, Count (1341–1361)
- Eberhard II, Count (1361–1399)
- Philip II, Count (1399–1439)

- Isenburg-Kempenich (complete list) –

- Gerard I, Count (13th/14th century)
- Theodoric IV, Count (?–1329)
- Theodoric V the Arsonist, Count (1329–1330)
- Gerard II, Count (1329–1330)
- Simon I, Count (1329–1341)
- Simon II, Count (1341–1367)
- Henry, Count (1367)
- Simon III, Count (1367–1420)

- Isenburg-Limburg (complete list) –

- John I the Blind Lord, Count (1289–1312/19)
- Gerlach V the Elder, Count (1312/19–1355)
- Gerlach VI the Younger, Count (1355–1365)
- John II, Count (1365–1406)

- County of Leiningen (de:complete list) –

- Friedrich IV, Count (c.1287–1316)

divided into Leiningen-Dagsburg and Leiningen-Hartenburg

- Leiningen-Dagsburg –

- Friedrich VI, Count (1316–1327)
- Friedrich VII, Count (1327–pre-1342)
- Friedrich VIII, Count (pre-1342–1387)

- Leiningen-Hardenburg (de:complete list) –

- Gottfried, Count (1316–14th century)
- Emich V, Count (14th century)

- Duchy of Lorraine (complete list) –

- Frederick III, Duke (1251–1302)
- Theobald II, Duke (1302–1312)
- Frederick IV, Duke (1312–1329)
- Raoul, Duke (1329–1346)
- John I, Duke (1346–1390)
- Charles II, Duke (1390–1431)

- County of Nassau-Beilstein –

- Henry I, Count (1343–1388)
- Henry II, co-Count (1388–1410)
- Reinhard, co-Count (1388–1412)

- Nassau-Weilburg (complete list) –

- John I, Count (1344–1371)
- Philip I, Count (1371–1429)

- Nassau-Saarbrücken (complete list) –

- Simon IV, Count (1271–1308)
- John I, Count (1308–1342)
- John II, Count (1342–1381)
- Joan, Countess (1381)
- Philip I, Count (1381–1429)

- Lower Salm (complete list) –

- Henry V, Count (1297–1336)
- Henry VI, Count (1336–1362)
- John, Count (1362–1370)
- Henry VII, Count (1370–1416)

- Upper Salm (complete list) –

- John I, Count (1293–1326)
- Nicolas, Count (1326–1343)
- John II, Count (1343–1351)
- Simon I, Count (1351–1360)
- John III, Count (1360–1386)
- Simon II, Count (1386–1397)
- John IV, Count (1397–1431)

- Salm-Blankenburg (complete list) –

- Henry I, Count (1270–1301)
- Henry II, Count (1301–1361)
- Theobald I, Count (1361–1363)
- Henry III, Count (1363–1382)
- Theobald II, Count (1382–1396)
- Henry IV, Count (1396–1441)

- Prince-Bishopric of Sion (complete list) –

- Boniface of Challant, Prince-Bishop (1289–1308)
- Aymon of Châtillon, Prince-Bishop (1308–1323)
- Aymon of La Tour, Prince-Bishop (1323–1338)
- Philippe of Chamberlhac, Prince-Bishop (1338–1342)
- Guichard Tavelli, Prince-Bishop (1342–1375)
- Édouard of Savoy, Prince-Bishop (1375–1386)

loyal to Avignon

- Guillaume of La Baume-Saint-Amourb, Prince-Bishop, loyal to Avignon (1386)
- Robert Chambrier, Prince-Bishop, loyal to Avignon (1387)
- Humbert de Billens, Prince-Bishop, loyal to Avignon (1388–1392)
- Aymon Séchala, Prince-Bishop, loyal to Avignon (1398–1404)

loyal to Rome

- Gerardus, Prince-Bishop, loyal to Rome (1387–1388)
- Henri de Blanchis, Prince-Bishop, loyal to Rome(1392–1393)
- Guillaume IV, Prince-Bishop, loyal to Rome(1394–1402)

- Solms-Braunfels (complete list) –

- Henry III, Count (1258–1312)
- Bernhard I, Count (1312–1349)
- Otto I, Count (1349–1410)

- Prince-Bishopric of Speyer (complete list) –

- Friedrich of Bolanden, Prince-bishop (1272–1302)
- Sigibodo of Lichtenberg, Prince-bishop (1302–1314)
- Emich of Leiningen, Prince-bishop (1314–1328)
- Berthold of Bucheck, Prince-bishop (1328–1328)
- Walram of Veldenz, Prince-bishop (1328–1336)
- Baldwin, Archbishop of Trier, Administrator (1332–1336)
- Gerhard of Ehrenberg, Prince-bishop (1336–1363)
- Lambert of Born (Brunn?), Prince-bishop (1364–1371)
- Adolf I, Count of Nassau, Prince-bishop (1371–1388)
- Nikolaus I aus Wiesbaden, Prince-bishop (1388–1396)

- Prince-Bishopric of Strasbourg (complete list) –

- Friedrich I von Lichtenberg, Prince-Bishop (1299–1306)
- Johann I von Dürbheim, Prince-Bishop (1307–1328)
- Berthold II of Bucheck, Prince-Bishop (1328–1353)
- Johann II von Lichtenberg, Prince-Bishop (1353–1365)
- Johann III von Luxemburg-Ligny, Prince-Bishop (1366–1371)
- Lamprecht of Brunn, Prince-Bishop (1371–1374)
- Friedrich II von Blankenheim, Prince-Bishop (1375–1393)
- Ludwig von Thierstein, Prince-Bishop (1393)
- Burkhard II von Lützelstein, Prince-Bishop (1393–1394)
- Wilhelm II von Diest, Prince-Bishop (1394–1439)

- County of Waldeck –

- Otto II, Count (1344–1369)
- Henry VI, Count (1369–1397)

- County of Waldeck-Landau, Older Line –

- Adolph III, Count (1397–1431)

- County of Waldeck-Waldeck –

- Henry VII, Count (1397–c.1444)

- Prince-Bishopric of Worms (complete list) –

- Eberwin von Kronenberg, Prince-bishop (1300–1308)
- sede vacante, Prince-bishop (1309–1310 )
- Baldwin of Luxembourg, Diocesan administrator (1309–1310)
- Emeric von Schoneck, Prince-bishop (1310–1318)
- Heinrich III of Dhaun, Prince-bishop (1318–1319)
- Konrad IV von Schoneck, Prince-bishop (1319–1329)
- Gerlach von Erbach, Prince-bishop (1329–1332)
- Salomon Waldbott, Prince-bishop (1332–1350)
- Dietrich I Bayer von Boppard, Prince-bishop (1350–1365)
- Johann Schadland, Prince-bishop (1365–1370)
- Echard von Dersch, Prince-bishop (1370–1405)

== Lower Saxon ==
- Prince-Archbishopric of Bremen (complete list) –

- Gilbert of Brunckhorst, Prince-archbishop (1274–1306)
- Henry I, Prince-archbishop elect (1306–1307)
- Florence, Prince-archbishop elect (1307)
- Bernard of Wölpe, Prince-archbishop elect (1307)
- John I, Prince-archbishop (1310–1316)
- John of Brunswick and Lunenburg (Celle line), Administrator (1316–1324)
- Nicolaus Ketelhot, Administrator (1324–1327)
- Burchard II, Prince-archbishop (1327–1344)
- Otto I, Prince-archbishop (1344–1348)
- Maurice of Oldenburg Administrator (1345–1360/62)
- Albert II, Prince-archbishop (1360–1395)
- Otto II, Prince-archbishop (1395–1406)

- Principality of Brunswick-Wolfenbüttel/ Principality of Wolfenbüttel (complete list) –

- Albert II the Fat, Prince of Brunswick-Wolfenbüttel (1279–1291, 1292–1318), of Göttingen (1286–1318)
- Otto the Mild, co-Prince (1318–1344)
- Ernest I, co-Prince of Brunswick-Wolfenbüttel (1318–1344), Prince of Göttingen (1344–1367)
- Magnus the Pious, co-Prince of Brunswick-Wolfenbüttel (1318–1344), of Wolfenbüttel (1344–1369)
- Magnus II of the Necklace, Prince of Lüneburg (1369–1373), Prince of Brunswick-Wolfenbüttel (1369–1373)
- Frederick I, Prince (1373–1400)
- Henry I the Mild, co-Prince of Lüneburg (1388–1416), co-Prince of Brunswick-Wolfenbüttel (1400–1409)
- Bernard I, co-Prince of Lunenburg (1388–1409, 1428–1434), Prince of Brunswick-Wolfenbüttel (1400–1428)

- Gandersheim Abbey (complete list) –

- Margarete I, Princess-Abbess (1253–1305)
- Mechthild II, Princess-Abbess (1305–1316)
- Sophia II, Princess-Abbess (1317–1331)
- Jutta, Princess-Abbess (1331–1357)
- Ermegardis, Princess-Abbess (1357–1358)
- Lutgard III, Princess-Abbess (1359–1402)

- Principality of Göttingen (complete list) –

- Albert II the Fat, Prince of Brunswick-Wolfenbüttel (1279–1291, 1292–1318), of Göttingen (1286–1318)
- Ernest I, co-Prince of Brunswick-Wolfenbüttel (1318–1344), Prince of Göttingen (1344–1367)
- Otto the Evil, Prince (1367–1394)
- Otto II the One-eyed, Prince (1394–1463)

- Principality of Grubenhagen (complete list) –

- Henry I the Admirable, co-Prince of Brunswick-Wolfenbüttel (1279–1291), Prince of Grubenhagen (1291–1322)
- Henry II, co-Prince (1322–1325)
- John I, co-Prince (1322–1325)
- William, co-Prince (1322–1360)
- Ernest I, co-Prince (1322–1361)
- John II, co-Prince (1361–1364)
- Albert I, Prince (1361–1383)
- Eric, co-Prince (1383–1427)

- Prince-Bishopric of Hildesheim (complete list) –

- Siegfried II of Querfurt, Prince-bishop (1279–1310)
- Heinrich II of Woldenberg, Prince-bishop (1310–1318)
- Otto II. von Woldenberg, Prince-bishop (1318–1331)
- Henry III of Brunswick-Lüneburg, Prince-bishop (1331–1363)
- Eric I of Schauenburg, Prince-bishop (1332–1349)
- Johann Schadland, Prince-bishop (1363–1365)
- Gerhard vom Berge, Prince-bishop (1365–1398)
- Johann I. von Paderborn, Prince-bishop (1399–1424)

- Holstein-Kiel (complete list) –

- John II the One-Eyed, co-Count of Holstein-Kiel (1263–1273), Count (1273–1316)
- John III the Mild, Count of Holstein-Plön (1312–1316, 1350–1359), of Holstein-Kiel (1316–1359)
- Adolph IX the Mild, Count (1359–1390)

- Holstein-Pinneberg (Holstein-Schaumburg) (complete list) –

- Adolph VI the Elder, Count (1290–1315)
- Adolf VII, Count (1315–1353)
- Adolf VIII, Count (1353–1370)
- Otto I, Count (1370–1404)

- Holstein-Plön (complete list) –

- Gerhard II the Blind, Count (1290–1312)
- John III the Mild, Count of Holstein-Plön (1312–1316, 1350–1359), of Holstein-Kiel (1316–1359)
- Gerhard IV, Count (1312–1323)
- Gerhard V, Count (1323–1350)

- Holstein-Rendsburg (complete list) –

- Henry I, Count (1290–1304)
- Gerhard III the Great, Count (1304–1340)
- Henry II of Iron, co-Count (1340–1384)
- Nicholas I, co-Count (1340–1397)
- Albert II, co-Count (1384–1397)
- Gerhard VI, co-Count (1384–1404)

- Holstein-Segeberg –

- Adolph V, co-Count of Holstein-Kiel (1263–1273), Count of Holstein-Segeberg (1273–1308)
- Adolph VII, Count (1308–1315)
- Albert II, Count (1397–1403)

- Prince-bishopric of Lübeck (complete list) –

- Burkhard of Serkem, Prince-bishop (1276–1317)
- Henry II, Prince-bishop (1317–1341)
- John IV, Prince-bishop (1341–1350)
- Bertram Cremon, Prince-bishop (1350–1377)
- Nicholas I, Prince-bishop (1377–1379)
- Conrad III of Geisenheim, Prince-bishop (1379–1386)
- John V of Klenedenst, Prince-bishop (1386–1387)
- Eberhard I, Prince-bishop (1387–1399)
- John VI, Prince-bishop (1399–1420)

- Free City of Lübeck (complete list) –

- Bernhard von Coesfeld, Mayor (1299–1301)
- Johann Runese, Mayor (1292, 1299–1317)
- Bruno Warendorp, Mayor (1301–1341)
- Segebodo Crispin, Mayor (1301–1323)
- Albert von Bardewik, Mayor (1308–1310)
- Alexander Lüneburg, Mayor (1302)
- Arnold Pape, Mayor (1314–1319)
- Marquard Vorrade, Mayor (1302–1307)
- Hinrich Pleskow, Mayor (1320–1340)
- Hinrich von Wittenborg, Mayor (1318–1321)
- Hermann Morneweg, Mayor (1312–1338)
- Konrad von Attendorn, Mayor (1324–1339)
- Hermann Warendorp, Mayor (1328–1333)
- Marquard von Coesfeld, Mayor (1341–1342)
- Hermann von Wickede I, Mayor (1365–1367)
- Eberhard von Alen, Mayor (1340–1342)
- Nicolaus Schoneke, Mayor (1347)
- Bertram Vorrade, Mayor (1363)
- Hinrich Pape, Mayor (1342)
- Tidemann von Güstrow, Mayor (1347)
- Bertram Heideby, Mayor (1343)
- Tidemann Warendorp, Mayor (1351)
- Hinrich Pleskow, Mayor (1357)
- Johann Wittenborg, Mayor (1360)
- Hermann Gallin, Mayor (1359)
- Johannes Perzeval, Mayor (1363)
- Jakob Pleskow, Mayor (1364)
- Simon Swerting, Mayor (1370)
- Thomas Morkerke, Mayor (1386)
- Bruno von Warendorp, Mayor (1367)
- Gerhard von Attendorn, Mayor (1382)
- Hartmann Pepersack, Mayor (1373)
- Gottfried Travelmann, Mayor (1390)
- Hinrich Westhof, Mayor (1392)
- Goswin Klingenberg, Mayor (1397)
- Johann Lüneburg, Mayor (1392)
- Johann Niebur, Mayor (1393)
- Jordan Pleskow, Mayor (1400–1425)

- Principality of Lüneburg (complete list) –

- Otto II the Strict, Prince (1277–1330)
- Otto III, Prince (1330–1352)
- William II, Prince (1330–1369)
- Magnus II of the Necklace, Prince of Lüneburg (1369–1373), Prince of Brunswick-Wolfenbüttel (1369–1373)
- Albert of Saxe-Wittenberg, co-Prince (1370–1385)
- Wenceslaus of Saxe-Wittenberg, co-Prince (1370–1388)
- Bernard I, co-Prince of Lunenburg (1388–1409, 1428–1434), Prince of Brunswick-Wolfenbüttel (1400–1428)
- Henry I the Mild, co-Prince of Lüneburg (1388–1416), co-Prince of Brunswick-Wolfenbüttel (1400–1409)

- Prince-Archbishopric of Magdeburg (complete list) –

- Burkhard II of Blankenburg, Prince-archbishop (1295–1305)
- Henry III, Prince of Anhalt-Aschersleben, Prince-archbishop (1305–1307)
- Burkhard III of Mansfeld-Schrapglau, Prince-archbishop (1307–1325)
- Heideke of Erssa, Prince-archbishop (1326–1327)
- Otto of Hesse, Prince-archbishop (1327–1361)
- Dietrich Kagelwit, Prince-archbishop (1361–1367)
- Albert II of Sternberg, Prince-archbishop (1367–1372)
- Peter Gelvto, Prince-archbishop (1372–1381)
- Louis of Meissen, Prince-archbishop (1381–1382)
- Frederick II of Hoym, Prince-archbishop (1382)
- Albert III of Querfurt, Prince-archbishop (1382–1403)

- Mecklenburg (complete list) –

- Henry I the Pilgrim, Lord (1264–1275, 1299–1302)
- Henry II the Lion, Lord (1290–1329)
- Albert II the Great, Lord of Mecklenburg (1329–1347), Duke of Mecklenburg-Schwerin (1347–1379)

- Duchy of Mecklenburg-Schwerin (complete list) –

- Albert II the Great, Lord of Mecklenburg (1329–1347), Duke of Mecklenburg-Schwerin (1347–1379)
- Henry III, Duke (1379–1383)
- Magnus I, Duke (1379–1384)
- Albert III, Duke (1384–1412)
- Albert IV, Duke (1384–1388)
- John IV, Duke (1384–1422)
- Eric I, Duke (1396–1397)

- Mecklenburg-Stargard (complete list) –

- John I, Duke (1352–1392/93)
- Albert I, co-Duke (1392/93–1397)
- John II, co-Duke (1392/93–1416)
- Ulrich I, co-Duke (1392/93–1417)

- County of Oldenburg (complete list) –

- Otto II, Count (1272–1301)
- John II, Count (1278–1305)
- Christian IV. (Oldenburg), Count (1302–1323)
- Johann III. (Oldenburg), Count (1305–1345)
- Johann IV. (Oldenburg), Count (1331–1356)
- Conrad I, Count (1345–1368)
- Konrad II. (Oldenburg), Count (1368–1386)
- Moritz II. (Oldenburg), Count (1386–1420)
- Christian V, Count (1368–1398)
- Christian VI. (Oldenburg), Count (1398–1423)

- Lordship of Rostock –

- Nicholas I the Child, Lord (1282–1314)

- Saxe-Lauenburg (complete list) –

- Albert III, co-Duke of Saxony (1282–1296), Duke of Saxe-Lauenburg (1296–1303), of Saxe-Ratzeburg (1303–1308)
- John II, co-Duke of Saxony (1282–1296), Duke of Saxe-Lauenburg (1296–1303), of Saxe-Mölln (1303–1322)
- Eric I, co-Duke of Saxony (1282–1296), Duke of Saxe-Lauenburg (1296–1303), of Saxe-Bergedorf (1303–1321), of Saxe-Ratzeburg (1308–1338)

- Saxe-Bergedorf (complete list) –

- Eric I, co-Duke of Saxony (1282–1296), Duke of Saxe-Lauenburg (1296–1303), of Saxe-Bergedorf (1303–1321), of Saxe-Ratzeburg (1308–1338)

- Saxe-Mölln (complete list) –

- John II, co-Duke of Saxony (1282–1296), Duke of Saxe-Lauenburg (1296–1303), of Saxe-Mölln (1303–1322)
- Elizabeth of Holstein-Rendsburg, Regent (1322–1330)
- Albert IV, Duke (1322–1343)
- John III, Duke (1343–1356)
- Albert V, Duke (1356–1370)
- Eric III, Duke (1370–1401)

- Saxe-Ratzeburg (complete list) –

- Albert III, co-Duke of Saxony (1282–1296), Duke of Saxe-Lauenburg (1296–1303), of Saxe-Ratzeburg (1303–1308)
- Margaret of Brandenburg, Duchess (1308–1315)
- Eric I, co-Duke of Saxony (1282–1296), Duke of Saxe-Lauenburg (1296–1303), of Saxe-Bergedorf (1303–1321), of Saxe-Ratzeburg (1308–1338)
- Eric II, Duke (1338–1368)
- Eric IV, Duke of Saxe-Ratzeburg (1368–1401), co-Duke of Saxe-Lauenburg (1401–1411/12)

- Werle (complete list) –

- Nicholas II, Lord of Werle-Parchim (1291–1294), of Werle (1294–1316)

- Werle-Goldberg (complete list) –

- John III Ruoden, Lord (1316–1350)
- Nicholas IV the Pig-Eyed, Lord (1350–1354)
- John IV, Lord (1354–1374)

- Werle-Güstrow (complete list) –

- John II the Bald, Lord (1316–1337)
- Nicholas III Staveleke, Lord (1337–1360)
- John V, co-Lord (1360–1378)
- Lorenz, co-Lord (1360–1393/94)
- John VII, co-Lord (1393/94–1414)
- Balthasar, co-Lord (1393/94–1421)

- Werle-Waren (complete list) –

- Bernard II, Lord (1337–1382)
- John VI, Lord (1382–1395)
- Nicholas V, co-Lord (1395–1408)
- Christopher, co-Lord (1395–1425)

== Upper Saxon ==
- Saxe-Wittenberg/ Electorate of Saxony (complete list) –

- Rudolph I, Duke (1298–1356), Elector (1356)
- Rudolph II the Blind, Elector (1356–1370)
- Wenceslaus I, Elector (1370–1388)
- Rudolf III, Elector (1388–1419)

- Anhalt-Aschersleben (complete list) –

- Otto I, co-Prince (1270–1304)
- Otto II, Prince (1304–1315)

- Anhalt-Bernburg (complete list) –

- Bernhard II, Prince (1287–1323)
- Bernhard III, Prince (1323–1348)
- Bernhard IV, Prince (1348–1354)
- Henry IV, Prince (1354–1374)
- Otto III, Prince (1374–1404)

- Anhalt-Zerbst (complete list) –

- Albert I, Prince (1298–1316)
- Albert II, co-Prince (1316–1362)
- Albert III, co-Prince (1359)
- Waldemar I, co-Prince (1316–1368)
- John II, co-Prince (1362–1382)
- Waldemar II, co-Prince (1368–1371)
- Waldemar III, co-Prince (1382–1391)
- Sigismund I, co-Prince of Anhalt-Zerbst (1382–1396), Prince of Anhalt-Dessau (1396–1405)
- Albert IV, co-Prince of Anhalt-Zerbst (1382–1396), Prince of Anhalt-Köthen (1396–1423)

- Anhalt-Dessau (complete list) –

- Sigismund I, co-Prince of Anhalt-Zerbst (1382–1396), Prince of Anhalt-Dessau (1396–1405)

- Margraviate of Brandenburg-Stendal (complete list) –

- Conrad, co-Margrave (1266–1304)
- Otto IV of the Arrow, co-Margrave (1266–1308/09)
- Henry I Lackland, co-Margraviate of Brandenburg-Stendal (1294–1317), of Brandenburg (1317–1318)
- Waldemar I the Great, co-Margraviate of Brandenburg-Stendal (1308–1317), of Brandenburg (1317–1319)

- Margraviate of Brandenburg-Salzwedel (complete list) –

- Herman I the Tall, co-Margrave (1298/99–1308)
- John V the Illustrious, co-Margrave (1308–1317)

- Margraviate/ Electorate of Brandenburg (complete list) –

House of Ascania

- Henry I Lackland, Margraviate of Brandenburg-Stendal (1294–1317), of Brandenburg (1317–1318)
- Waldemar I the Great, Margraviate of Brandenburg-Stendal (1308–1317), of Brandenburg (1317–1319)
- Henry II the Child, Margraviate of Brandenburg (1319–1320)

House of Wittelsbach

- Louis I the Brandenburger, Margrave (1323–1351)
- Louis II the Roman, Margrave (1351–1356), Elector (1356–1365)
- Otto VII the Lazy, Margrave (1351–1356), Elector (1356–1373)

House of Luxemburg

- Wenceslaus, Elector (1373–1378)
- Sigismund, Elector (1378–1388, 1411–1415)
- Jobst, Elector (1388–1411)

- Margravate of Meissen (complete list) –

- Albert III, Margrave (1298–1307)
- Frederick II, Margrave (1323–1349)
- Frederick III, Margrave (1349–1381)
- Balthasar, Margrave (1349–1382)
- William I, Margrave (1349–1407)
- George, Margrave (1381–1402)
- William II, Margrave (1381–1425)
- Frederick IV, Margrave (1381–1428)

- Pomerania-Stettin (complete list) –

- Otto I, co-Duke of Pomeranian (1278–c.1295), Duke of Pomerania-Stettin (c.1295–1344)
- Barnim III the Great, Duke (1344–1368)
- Casimir III, Duke (1368–1372)
- Bogislaw VII the Older, co-Duke (1372–1404)

- Pomerania-Wolgast, Pomerania-Barth (complete list) –

- Bogislaw IV, co-Duke of Pomerania (1278–c.1295) Duke of Pomerania-Wolgast (c.1295–1309)
- Wartislaw IV, Duke of Pomerania-Wolgast (1309–1326)
- Elisabeth of Lindow-Ruppin, Regent of Pomerania-Wolgast (1326–c.1330)
- Bogislaw V the Great, co-Duke of Pomerania-Wolgast (1326–1368), Duke of Pomerania-Stolp (1368–1374)
- Wartislaw V the Father of the People, co-Duke of Pomerania-Wolgast (1326–1368)
- Barnim IV the Good, co-Duke of Pomerania-Wolgast (1326–1365)
- Bogislaw VI, co-Duke of Pomerania-Wolgast (1365–1377), Duke of Pomerania-Wolgast (1377–1393)
- Wartislaw VI the One-Eyed, co-Duke of Pomerania-Wolgast (1365–1377), Duke of Pomerania-Barth (1377–1393), of Pomerania-Wolgast (1393–1394)
- Barnim VI, co-Duke of Pomerania-Wolgast (1394–1405)
- Wartislaw VIII, co-Duke of Pomerania-Wolgast (1393–1415)

- Pomerania-Stolp, Pomerania-Stargard (complete list, complete list) –

- Bogislaw V the Great, co-Duke of Pomerania-Wolgast (1326–1368), Duke of Pomerania-Stolp (1368–1374)
- Casimir IV, Duke of Pomerania-Stolp (1374–1377)
- Wartislaw VII, Duke of Pomerania-Stolp (1377–1394/95)
- Barnim V, co-Duke of Pomerania-Stargard (1377–1394/95), of Pomerania-Stolp (1394/95–1403)
- Bogislaw VIII Magnus, co-Duke of Pomerania-Stargard (1377–1394/95), of Pomerania-Stolp (1394/95–1418)

- County of Stolberg (de:complete list) –

- Otto I. zu Stolberg, Count (c.1305–1338)
- Heinrich XVI. zu Stolberg, Count (c.1335)
- Heinrich zu Stolberg, Count (?–post-1402)
- Botho zu Stolberg zu Wernigerode (c.1370–1455)

- Landgraviate of Thuringia (complete list) –

- Albert of Habsburg, Landgrave (1298–1307)
- Theodoric IV, Landgrave (1298–1307)
- Frederick I, Landgrave (1298–1323)
- Frederick II, Landgrave (1323–1349)
- Frederick III, Landgrave (1349–1381)
- William I, Landgrave (1349–1382)
- Balthasar, Landgrave (1349–1406)

== Swabian ==
- Duchy of Swabia (complete list) –

- John Parricida, Duke (1290–1309)

- Prince-Bishopric of Augsburg (complete list) –

- Wolfhard of Roth, Prince-bishop (1288–1302)
- Degenhard of Hellenstein, Prince-bishop (1303–1307)
- Friedrich I Spät of Faimingen, Prince-bishop (1309–1331)
- Ulrich II of Schönegg, Prince-bishop (1331–1337)
- Henry III of Schönegg, Prince-bishop (1337–1348)
- Marquard of Randeck, Prince-bishop (1348–1365)
- Walter II of Hochschlitz, Prince-bishop (1365–1369)
- Johann Schadland, Prince-bishop (1371–1372)
- Burkhard of Ellerbach, Prince-bishop (1373–1404)

- Margraviate of Baden-Eberstein (complete list) –

- Frederick II, Margrave (1291–1333)
- Herman IX, Margrave (1333–1353)

- Margraviate of Baden-Pforzheim (complete list) –

- Rudolph IV, Margrave of Baden-Pforzheim (1291–1348), of Baden-Baden (1335–1348)
- Rudolph V, Margrave (1348–1361)
- Rudolph VI, Margrave of Baden-Baden (1353–1372), of Baden-Pforzheim (1361–1372)

- Margraviate of Baden-Baden (complete list) –

- Rudolph III the Younger, co-Margrave (1288–1332)
- Rudolph Hesso, Margrave (1297–1335)
- Rudolph IV, Margrave of Baden-Pforzheim (1291–1348), of Baden-Baden (1335–1348)
- Frederick III, Margrave (1348–1353)
- Rudolph VI, Margrave of Baden-Baden (1353–1372), of Baden-Pforzheim (1361–1372)
- Rudolph VII, Margrave (1372–1391)
- Bernard I, Margrave of Baden-Pforzheim (1372–1431), of Baden-Baden (1391–1431), of Baden-Hachberg (1415–1431)

- Margraviate of Baden-Hachberg (complete list) –

- Henry III, Margrave (1289–1330)
- Henry IV, Margrave (1330–1369)
- Otto I, Margrave (1369–1386)
- John I, co-Margrave (1386–1409)
- Hesso II, co-Margrave (1386–1410)

- Margraviate of Baden-Sausenberg (complete list) –

- Rudolph I, Margrave (1306)
- Henry IV, co-Margrave (1312–1318)
- Rudolph II, co-Margrave (1313–1352)
- Otto I, co-Margrave (1318–1384)
- Rudolph III, Margrave (1352–1428)

- Prince-Bishopric of Constance (complete list) –

- Henrich von Klingenberg, Prince-bishop (1293–1306)
- Gerhard von Bevar, Prince-bishop (1307–1318)
- Rudolf von Montfort, Prince-bishop (1322–1334)
- Nikolaus de Kentzingen, Prince-bishop (1334–1344)
- Ulrich Pfefferhard, Prince-bishop (1345–1351)
- Johann Windlock, Prince-bishop (1352–1356)
- Heinrich von Brandis, Prince-bishop (1357–1383)
- Marquard von Randegg, Prince-bishop (1398–1406)

- Ellwangen Abbey (complete list) –

- Ekkehard of Schwabsberg, Prince-abbot (1278–1309)
- Erenfrid of Vellberg, Prince-abbot (1309–1311)
- Rudolf of Pfahlheim, Prince-abbot (1311–1332)
- Kuno of Gundelfingen, Prince-abbot (1332–1367)
- Albrecht Hack of Wöllstein, Prince-abbot (1367–1400)

- County of Hohenberg (complete list) –

- Rudolf I, Count (1298–1336)
- Hugo, Count (c.1336–1354)
- Rudolf III, Count (1354–1389)

- Princely Abbey of Kempten (complete list) –

- Konrad von Gundelfingen, Prince-abbot (1286–1302)
- Hartmann IV of Rauns, Prince-abbot (1302–1315)
- Wilhelm, Prince-abbot (1315–1320)
- Heinrich V Unrein of Hirsendorf, Prince-abbot (1320–1331)
- Burkhard III Bürck of Hasenweiler, co-Prince-abbot (1331–1346)
- Konrad IV, co-Prince-abbot (1333–1346)
- Gerwig I of Helmshofen, co-Prince-abbot (1333–1336)
- Henry VI of Oberhofen, Prince-abbot (1346–1347)
- Randger Feldeck of Roggenfurt, Prince-abbot (1347–1356)
- Henry VII of Mittelburg, Prince-abbot (1356–1382)
- Pilgrim I of Nordholz, Prince-abbot (1382–1386)
- Frederick VI of Hirschdorf, Prince-abbot (1382–1405)

- Weingarten Abbey (complete list) –

- Friedrich Heller von Hellerstein, Prince-abbot (1300–1315)
- Konrad II von Ibach, Prince-abbot (1315–1336)
- Konrad III von Überlingen, Prince-abbot (1336–1346)
- Heinrich II von Ibach, Prince-abbot (1346–1363)
- Ludwig von Ibach-Heldenberg, Prince-abbot (1363–1393)
- Johann I von Essendorf, Prince-abbot (1393–1418)

- Barony of Westerburg (complete list) –

- Siegfried of Westerburg, Baron (?–1315)
- Reinhard I of Westerburg, Baron (?–1353)
- John I of Westerburg (1332–1370)
- Reinhard II of Westerburg (1354–1421)

- County of Württemberg (complete list) –

- Eberhard I, Count (1279–1325)
- Ulrich III, Count (1325–1344)
- Ulrich IV, Count (1344–1362)
- Eberhard II, Count (1344–1392)
- Eberhard III, Count (1392–1417)

== Italy ==
- Republic of Genoa (complete list) –

- Simone Boccanegra, Doge (1339–1344, first reign)
- Giovanni I di Murta, Doge (1344–1350)
- Giovanni II Valente, Doge (1350–1353)
- Simone Boccanegra, Doge (1356–1363, second reign)
- Gabriele Adorno, Doge (1363–1370)
- Domenico di Campofregoso, Doge (1370–1378)
- Antoniotto I Adorno, Doge (1378, first reign)
- Nicolò Guarco, Doge (1378–1383)
- Antoniotto I Adorno, Doge (1383, second reign)
- Federico di Pagana, Doge (1383)
- Leonardo Montaldo, Doge (1383–1385)
- Antoniotto I Adorno, Doge (1385–1390, third reign)
- Giacomo Fregoso, Doge (1390–1391)
- Antoniotto I Adorno, Doge (1391–1392, fourth reign)
- Antoniotto Montaldo, Doge (1392–1393, first reign)
- Pietro Fregoso, Doge (1393)
- Clemente Promontorio, Doge (1393)
- Francesco Giustiniano di Garibaldo, Doge (1393)
- Antoniotto Montaldo, Doge (1393–1394, second reign)
- Niccolo Zoagli, Doge (1394)
- Antonio Guarco, Doge (1394)
- Antoniotto I Adorno, Doge (1394–1396, 5th term)

- Republic of Lucca –

- Castruccio Castracani, Captain general (1316–1320), Lord (1320–1327), Duke (1327–1328)
- Paolo Guinigi, Lord (1400–1430)

- Duchy of Milan (complete list) –

- Matteo I, Duke (1294–1302, 1311–1322)
- Galeazzo I, Duke (1322–1327)
- Azzone, Duke (1329–1339)
- Luchino I, Duke (1339–1349)
- Giovanni, Duke (1349–1354)
- Bernabò, Duke (1354–1385)
- Galeazzo II, Duke (1354–1378)
- Matteo II, Duke (1354–1355)
- Gian Galeazzo Visconti, Duke (1395–1402)

- Principality of Orange (complete list) –

- Bertrand IV, Prince (1282–c.1314)
- Raymond IV, Prince (c.1314–1340)
- Raymond V, Prince (1340–1393)
- Mary, Princess, and John I, Prince (1393–1417)

- Papal States (complete list) –

- Boniface VIII, Pope (1294–1303)
- Benedict XI, Pope (1303–1304)
- Clement V, Pope (1305–1314)
- John XXII, Pope (1316–1334)
- Benedict XII, Pope (1334–1342)
- Clement VI, Pope (1342–1352)
- Innocent VI, Pope (1352–1362)
- Urban V, Pope (1362–1370)
- Gregory XI, Pope (1370–1378)
- Urban VI, Pope (1378–1389)
- Boniface IX, Pope (1389–1404)

From 1309 to 1376 the Papacy was based at Avignon, not Rome.

- County of Savoy (complete list) –

- Thomas, Count (1189–1233)
- Amadeus IV, Count (1233–1253)
- Boniface, Count (1253–1263)
- Peter II the Little Charlemagne, Count (1263–1268)
- Philip I, Count (1268–1285)
- Amadeus V the Great, Count (1285–1323)
- Edward the Liberal, Count (1323–1329)
- Aymon the Peaceful, Count (1329–1343)
- Amadeus VI the Green Count, Count (1343–1383)
- Amadeus VII the Red Count, Count (1383–1391)
- Amadeus VIII, Count (1391–1416), Duke (1416–1440)
