= 1393 =

1393 in various calendars
- Gregorian calendar: 1393; MCCCXCIII
- Ab urbe condita: 2146
- Armenian calendar: 842; ԹՎ ՊԽԲ
- Assyrian calendar: 6143
- Balinese saka calendar: 1314–1315
- Bengali calendar: 799–800
- Berber calendar: 2343
- English Regnal year: 16 Ric. 2 – 17 Ric. 2
- Buddhist calendar: 1937
- Burmese calendar: 755
- Byzantine calendar: 6901–6902
- Chinese calendar: 壬申年 (Water Monkey); 4090 or 3883 — to — 癸酉年 (Water Rooster); 4091 or 3884
- Coptic calendar: 1109–1110
- Discordian calendar: 2559
- Ethiopian calendar: 1385–1386
- Hebrew calendar: 5153–5154
- Hindu calendars
- Vikram Samvat: 1449–1450
- Shaka Samvat: 1314–1315
- Kali Yuga: 4493–4494
- Holocene calendar: 11393
- Igbo calendar: 393–394
- Iranian calendar: 771–772
- Islamic calendar: 795–796
- Japanese calendar: Meitoku 4 (明徳４年)
- Javanese calendar: 1307–1308
- Julian calendar: 1393; MCCCXCIII
- Korean calendar: 3726
- Minguo calendar: 519 before ROC 民前519年
- Nanakshahi calendar: −75
- Thai solar calendar: 1935–1936
- Tibetan calendar: ཆུ་ཕོ་སྤྲེ་ལོ་ (male Water-Monkey); 1519 or 1138 or 366 — to — ཆུ་མོ་བྱ་ལོ་ (female Water-Bird); 1520 or 1139 or 367

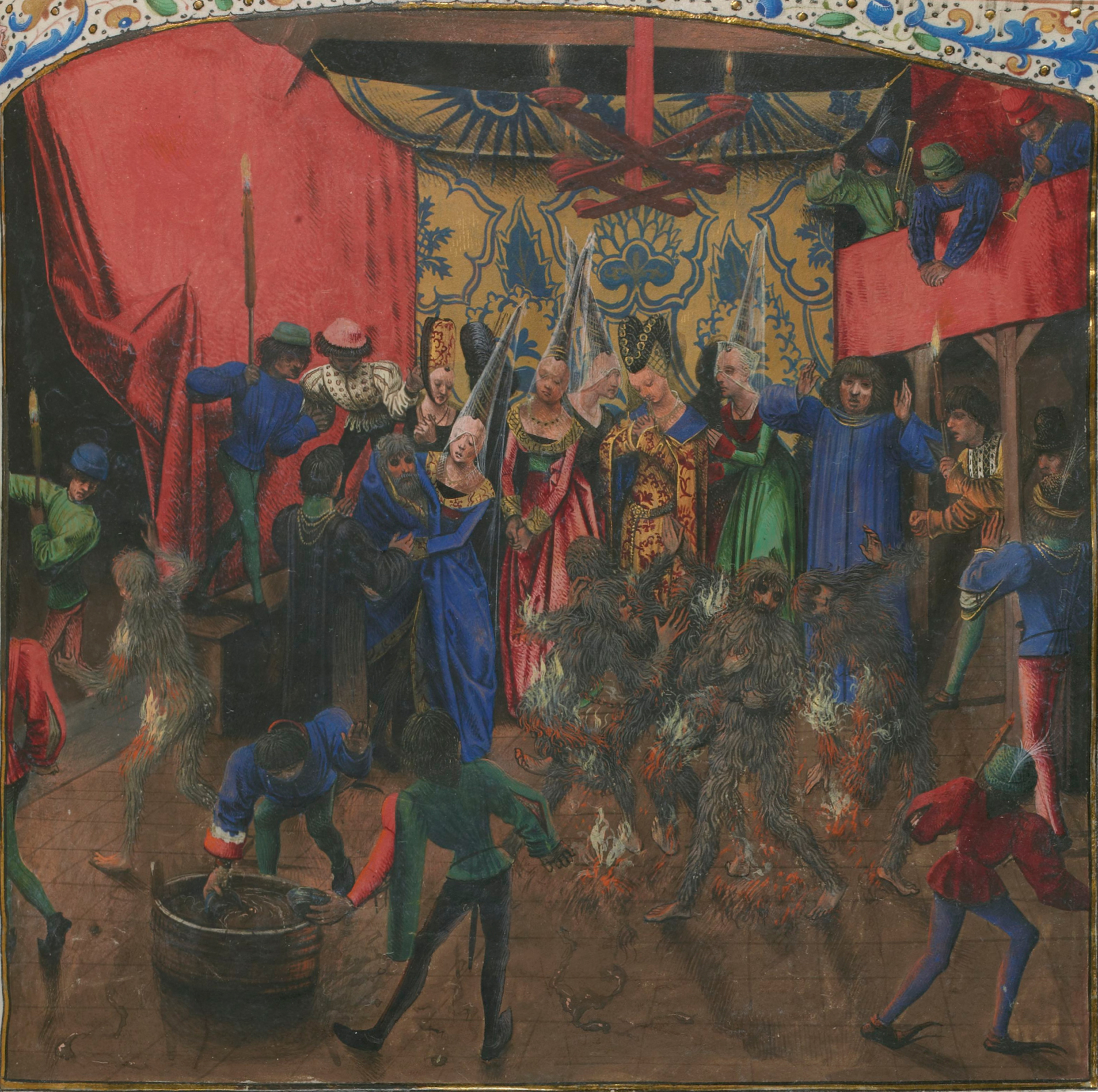
January 28: King Charles VI of France avoids burning to death at the Bal des Ardents.

Year 1393 (MCCCXCIII) was a common year starting on Wednesday (link will display full calendar) of the Julian calendar.

== January – March ==
- January 20 – The English Parliament, summoned November 23 by King Richard II of England, assembles at Winchester.
- January 28 – At the "Bal des Ardents", four members of the court of Charles VI of France, participating in a dance at the Palace of Saint-Pol in Paris for the entertainment of the guests at a wedding, are burned to death by accident at a masquerade ball. King Charles himself, one of the masked dancers, escapes injury when his aunt, Joan II, Countess of Auvergne, saves him.
- February 10 – The English Parliament adjourns after three weeks and the passage of numerous laws. Among the acts given royal assent are the Trade Act 1392 ("No merchant stranger shall buy or sell with another merchant stranger to sell again"), the Statute of Praemunire (which outlaws appealing an English court case to the Pope if the King of England objects) and the Weights and Measures Act 1392 ("The clerk of the market shall carry with him all his weights and measures signed.")
- February 27 – The Senate of the Republic of Venice secretly directs Paolo Foscari to seek an alliance with Nerio I Acciaioli, Duke of Athens and Theodore I Palaiologos, Despot of the Morea, against the mercenary Navarrese Company.
- March 23 – Bohemian priest John of Nepomuk is killed in Prague by being thrown off Charles Bridge into the Vltava river, allegedly at the behest of king Wenceslaus IV of Bohemia. Nepomuk later will be declared a saint.
- March 29 – In central Persia, the Muzzafarid Empire, led by Shah Mansur, rebels against their Timurid occupiers. The rebellion is quashed and the Shah is executed along with the whole Muzaffarid nobility, ending the Muzaffarid dynasty in Persia.

== April – June ==
- April 3 - Philippe III de Thurey, the Roman Catholic Archbishop of Lyon issues warrants approved by the Avignon Pope Clement VII to expel the officers of France's King Charles VI from Lyon, and drives the King's Sénéchal and deputies out of town.
- April 14 - To resolve issues remaining from the six-year long war in Myanmar between the Kingdom of Ava and the Hanthawaddy Kingdom, a delegation sent by King Swa Saw Ke of Ava arrives at Nanjing, capital of Ming dynasty China, to seek the aid of the court of the Emperor Zhu Yuanzhang. The mission is unsuccessful.
- April 17 - Sir Walter Blount and Henry Bowet are dispatched by John II, Duke of Aquitaine in France, a former claimant to the throne of Crown of Castile in Spain, to negotiate a peace with King Enrique III of Castile.
- May 29 - Abu Thabid II becomes the new ruler of the Kingdom of Tlemcen in what is now Algeria, succeeding Abu Tashufin II.
- June 4 – Hook and Cod wars: In Holland, after a revolt in Leiden by the "Hooks", elite members and guild members in the community, Albrecht van Beieren, Count of Holland, revokes promises previously made to the Hooks for more autonomy, appoints a new bench of adlermen from the "Cods" (his supporters), and punishes many of the rebels, either by exiling them or requiring them to go on the next pilgrimage to the Middle East.

== July – September ==
- July 8 - Abul Hadjadjadj I becomes the new ruler of the Kingdom of Tlemcen at Tlemcen in modern-day Algeria, succeeding Abu Thabid II. He reigns until November.
- July 13 - Vytautas the Great, Regent of the Duchy of Lithuania for Wladyslaw II Jagiello, King of Poland, begins a peace conference with the Teutonic Knights, convening in Thorn in the Holy Roman Empire (modernw Toruń in Poland)
- July 15 – A political crisis begins in the Republic of Genoa, with four different holders of the chief executive office over a period of several hours. Antoniotto di Montaldo, the "Lifetime Doge" for more than a year, resigns and directs that Pietro Fregoso shall be his successor. Fregoso takes office, but resigns the next day.
- July 16 – Clemente Promontorio takes over from Pietro Fregoso as the Lifetime Doge of Genoa, but is forced to flee his office hours later by Francesco Giustiniano di Garibaldo becomes the new Doge of the Republic.
- July 17 – Troops of the Ottoman Empire, led by General Süleyman Çelebi, capture the Bulgarian capital, Tarnovo, after a three-month siege, bringing an end to the Second Bulgarian Empire.
- July 23 – Konrad von Wallenrode, Grand Master of the Teutonic Knights snce 1391, dies of a stroke ten days after opening a peace conference at Thorn.
- July 30 – The return of the Montaldo faction to Genoa forces the Doge, Francesco di Garibaldo, to go into exile to allow the return of Antoniotto Montaldo, who had stepped down as Doge of Genoa 17 days earlier.
- August 2 – At the age of 13, Enrique el Doliente, who succeeded to the throne of the Crown of Castile upon the death of his father John I of Castile King Juan in 1390, dismisses his Regency Council and assumes full power as King Enrique III.
- August 15 – Leopold IV, Duke of Austria marries Catherine of Burgundy, daughter of Philip the Bold, Duke of Burgundy.
- August 29 – The conqueror Timur arrives with his army at the gates of Baghdad and Persian writer Nizam al-Din Shami will say later that he was the first to offer submission to the Amir of the Timurid Empire.
- September 13 – Sir Walter Devereux, a prominent knight in the English county of Herefordshire, is dispatched by King Richard II to suppress the Lollards, activists, led by Walter Brut, seeking a reformation of the Catholic Church in the county.

== October – December ==
- October 3 – Walter Brut, a leader of the Lollards sect of Christian reformers, is put on trial for heresy before the Roman Catholic Bishop of Hereford, Thomas Trefnant. Brut is acquitted of the charges.
- November – Abu Zayyan II succeeds his brother, Abul Hadjdjadj I, as ruler of the Zayyanid dynasty in modern-day eastern Algeria.
- November 13 – King Richard II of England orders members of the House of Lords and the House of Commons to meet at Westminster on January 27.
- November 20 – The conqueror Timur of the Timurid Empire in the Middle East begins the three-week siege of Takrit in what is now Iraq.
- November 30 – Konrad von Jungingen succeeds the late Konrad von Wallenrode, as Grand Master of the Teutonic Knights.
- December 11 – After a three week long siege, the city of Takrit, described in contemporary accounts as "a bandit stronghold said to be impregnable," falls to the troops of the conqueror Timur.
- December 15 – King Robert III of Scotland compensates the Monastery of Scone, where he had been crowned in 1390, for the expenses and inconvenience caused by his coronation and those of previous kings.
- December 26 – Traders from the island of Java (now part of Indonesia) arrive in China for their first overseas commerce with the Chinese Empire.

== Date unknown ==
- George VII succeeds his popular father, Bagrat V, as King of Georgia.
- Abdul Aziz II becomes Sultan of the Marinid dynasty in present-day Morocco, after the death of Sultan Abu Al-Abbas.
- Raimondo Del Balzo Orsini succeeds Otto, Duke of Brunswick-Grubenhagen, as Prince of Taranto (now southeastern Italy).
- Samsenethai succeeds his father, Fa Ngum, as King of Lan Xang (now Laos).
- King James I of Cyprus inherits the title of King of Armenia, after the death of his distant cousin Leo VI (although the Mamluk conquerors from Egypt remain the true rulers).
- A Ming dynasty Chinese record states that 720,000 sheets of toilet paper (two by three ft. in size) alone have been produced for the various members of the imperial court at Beijing, while the Imperial Bureau of Supplies also reports that 15,000 sheets of toilet paper alone have been designated for the royal family (made of fine soft yellow tissue and perfumed).
- Bosnia resists an invasion by the Ottoman Empire.
- The Ottoman Turks capture Turnovgrad (now Veliko Tarnovo), the capital city of east Bulgaria. Emperor Ivan Shishman is allowed to remain as puppet ruler of east Bulgaria.
- Despite his treaty with the king of Poland, Roman I of Moldavia supports Fyodor Koriatovych against the king. Losing the battle, he will also lose the throne of Moldavia the next year.
- Sikander Shah I succeeds Muhammad Shah III, as Sultan of Delhi. Sikander Shah I is succeeded two months later by Mahmud II.
- Maelruanaidh MacDermot succeeds Aedh MacDermot, as King of Magh Luirg in north-central Ireland.
- King Stjepan Dabiša of Bosnia signs the Contract of Djakovice, establishing peace with King Sigismund of Hungary.
- Byzantium loses Thessaly to the growing Ottoman Empire.
- In her aim to form The Kalmar Union, Queen Margaret I of Denmark is laying siege to Stockholm, which is controlled by troops loyal to the former Swedish king Albert of Mecklenburg.

== Births ==
- February 3 – Henry Percy, 2nd Earl of Northumberland (d. 1455)
- August 24 – Arthur III of Brittany (d. 1458)
- December – Margaret of Burgundy, Dauphine of France (d. 1442)
- date unknown
  - John Capgrave, English theologian (d. 1464)
  - Giovanni Antonio Del Balzo Orsini, Prince of Taranto (d. 1463)
  - Anna of Moscow, Byzantine empress consort (d. 1417)
  - Osbern Bokenam, English Augustinian friar and poet
  - Thomas de Morley, 5th Baron Morley
  - Andrea Vendramin, Doge of Venice (d. 1478)
  - Alvise Loredan, Venetian admiral and statesman (d. 1466)

== Deaths ==
- March 7 – Bogislaw VI, Duke of Pomerania (b. c. 1350)
- March 23 – John of Nepomuk, saint
- March 29 - Shah Mansur, Ruler of the Muzaffarids
- June 6 – Emperor Go-En'yū of Japan, former Pretender to the throne (b. 1359)
- July 23 – Konrad von Wallenrode, Grand Master of the Teutonic Knights
- July 30 – Alberto d'Este, Lord of Ferrara and Modena (b. 1347)
- August 6 – John de Ros, 5th Baron de Ros (b. 1365)
- November 29 – King Leo V of Armenia (b. c. 1342)
- date unknown
  - Fa Ngum, founder of the Lao Kingdom of Lan Xang (b. 1316)
  - Valentina Visconti, Queen of Cyprus
  - King Bagrat V of Georgia
  - Abu'l-Abbas Ahmad al-Mustansir, Sultan of the Marinid dynasty in Morocco
