= 1383 =

1383 in various calendars
- Gregorian calendar: 1383; MCCCLXXXIII
- Ab urbe condita: 2136
- Armenian calendar: 832; ԹՎ ՊԼԲ
- Assyrian calendar: 6133
- Balinese saka calendar: 1304–1305
- Bengali calendar: 789–790
- Berber calendar: 2333
- English Regnal year: 6 Ric. 2 – 7 Ric. 2
- Buddhist calendar: 1927
- Burmese calendar: 745
- Byzantine calendar: 6891–6892
- Chinese calendar: 壬戌年 (Water Dog); 4080 or 3873 — to — 癸亥年 (Water Pig); 4081 or 3874
- Coptic calendar: 1099–1100
- Discordian calendar: 2549
- Ethiopian calendar: 1375–1376
- Hebrew calendar: 5143–5144
- Hindu calendars
- Vikram Samvat: 1439–1440
- Shaka Samvat: 1304–1305
- Kali Yuga: 4483–4484
- Holocene calendar: 11383
- Igbo calendar: 383–384
- Iranian calendar: 761–762
- Islamic calendar: 784–785
- Japanese calendar: Eitoku 3 (永徳３年)
- Javanese calendar: 1296–1297
- Julian calendar: 1383; MCCCLXXXIII
- Korean calendar: 3716
- Minguo calendar: 529 before ROC 民前529年
- Nanakshahi calendar: −85
- Thai solar calendar: 1925–1926
- Tibetan calendar: ཆུ་ཕོ་ཁྱི་ལོ་ (male Water-Dog); 1509 or 1128 or 356 — to — ཆུ་མོ་ཕག་ལོ་ (female Water-Boar); 1510 or 1129 or 357

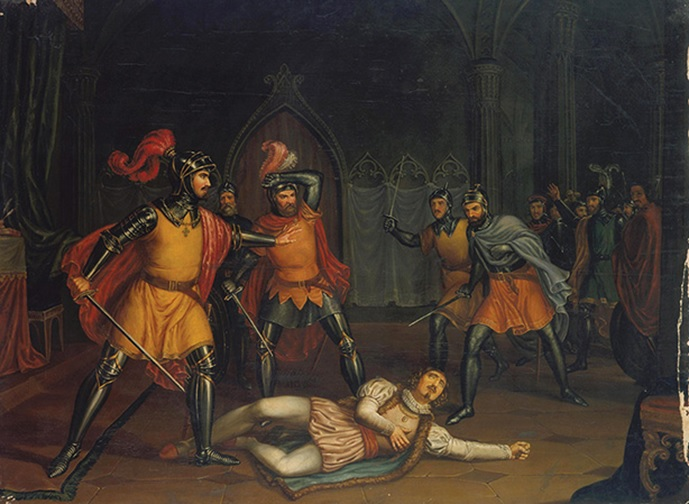
December 6: João, Master of Aviz, carries out the overthrow of the Portuguese government, starting with the assassination of Queen Beatriz's uncle, Count Andeiro

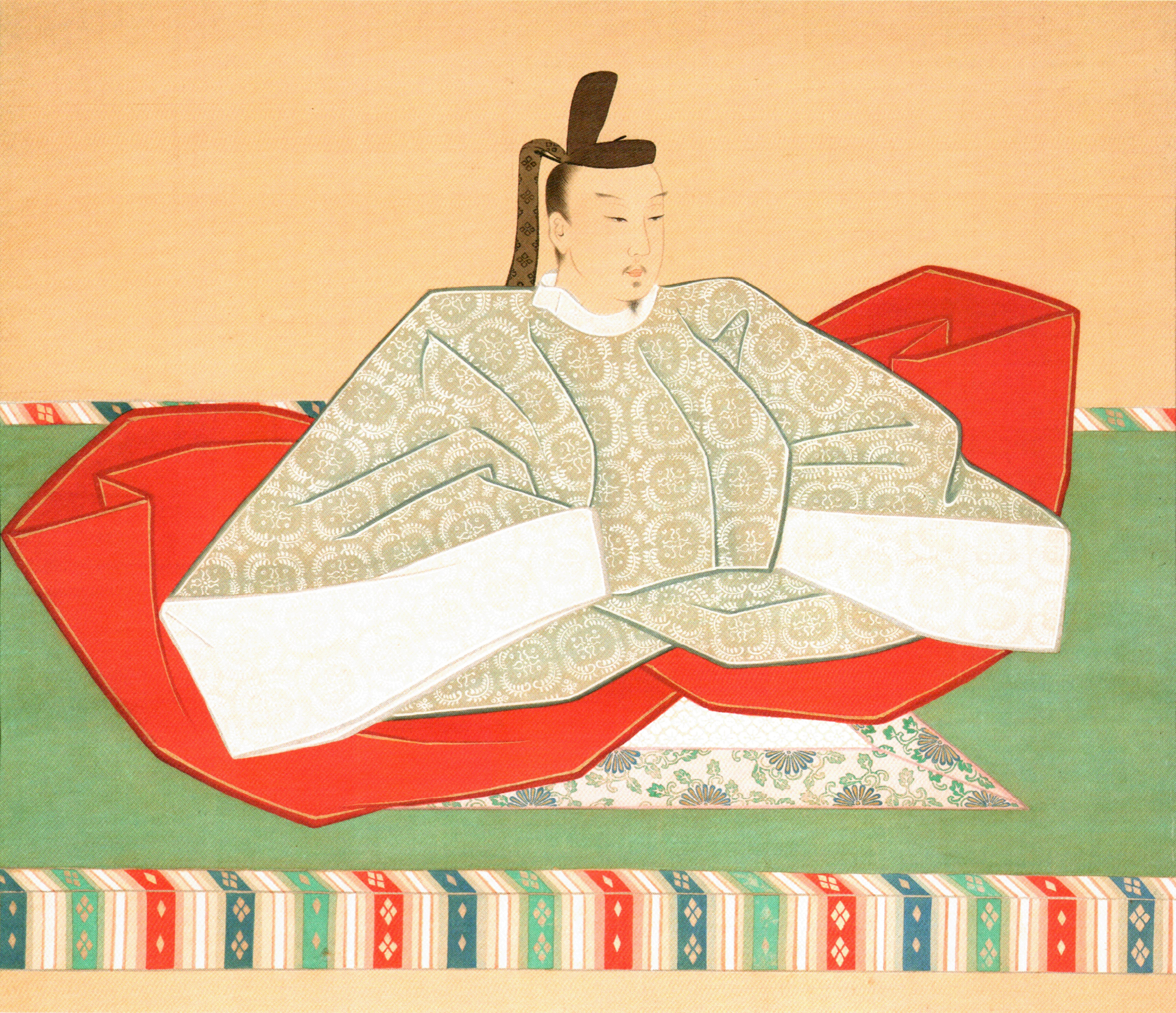
January 13: Japan's Emperor Go-Komatsu.jpg takes control of the northern part of the kingdom.

Year 1383 (MCCCLXXXIII) was a common year starting on Thursday of the Julian calendar.

== Events ==
=== January–March ===
- January 7 – King Richard II issues a summons for the Lords and members of the House of Commons to assemble for the English Parliament, to convene on February 23.
- January 13 – At Heian-kyō (now Kyoto), Go-Komatsu is enthroned as the Emperor of the Northern Court of Japan, after having succeeded to the throne on the abdication of Emperor Go-En'yū on November 19.
- February 11 – King Carlo III of Naples confiscates the property of Pietro d'Enghien and Luigi d'Enghien (both of whom are in Venice) and declares them both to be rebels against the Neapolitan crown.
- February 2 – The Doge of Genoa agrees to release King James I of Cyprus from captivity in return for an agreement that the King's son, Janus, will become the new prisoner.
- February 23 – The English Parliament opens at Westminster for its 9th session under the rule of King Richard II, and Sir James Pickering is elected as the Speaker of the House of Commons.
- March 10 – The English Parliament adjourns. Among the laws given royal assent by King Richard are the pardon of most "offenders in the last insurrection, with few exceptions" and a statute of limitations on actions for trespass.
- March 13 – Michael de la Pole becomes the new Lord Chancellor of the England for King Richard II.
- March 16 – In France, Évrart de Trémaugon, an adviser to King Charles V, interrupts the King's dinner at the Louvre Palace and accuses Guillaume de Chamborant, the King's equerry, of the murder of Evrart's brother Yvon.Famiglietti 2015, vol.1, p.279. Charges are eventually dropped against Chamborant 16 months later and Evrart is ordered on July 30, 1484, to pay 500 Livres tournois, equivalent to more than 404 kilograms of fine silver, to Chamborant.
- March 28 – In a proclamation made by her envoys to Poland, Elizabeth, the former Queen consort of Hungary and regent for her 10-year-old daughter Mary, Queen of Hungary, formally releases the Kingdom of Poland from an oath of loyalty to Mary and announces that she will send her 9-year-old daughter Hedwig to be the queen of Poland.

=== April–June ===
- April 7 – Nicolò Guarco is deposed as Doge of the Republic of Genoa and is replaced by Federico di Pagana, who in is forced to resign at the end of the day in favor of Leonardo Montaldo.
- May 5 – (3rd waxing of Nayon 745 ME) In what is now Myanmar, Prince Binnya Nwe begins a rebellion against his aunt, the regent Maha Dewi of Hanthawaddy, as he and 30 of his men seize the governor's residence at Dagon, near Yangon.
- May 17 – King John I of Castile and Leon marries Beatrice of Portugal.
- June 16 – At a meeting of the Polish nobles at Sieradz, Siemowit IV, Duke of Masovia announces that he will claim the crown as King of Poland. Queen Elizabeth of Hungary sends an army of 12,000 soldiers two months later to devastate the Duchy of Masovia and its capital, Warsaw, forcing Siemowit to give up his claims to the throne

=== July–September ===
- July 7 – James of Baux, ruler of Taranto and Achaea, and last titular Latin Emperor, dies childless. As a result, Charles III of Naples becomes ruler of Achaea (modern-day southern Greece); Otto, Duke of Brunswick-Grubenhagen, the widower of Joanna I of Naples, becomes ruler of Taranto (eastern Italy); and Louis I, Duke of Anjou inherits the claim to the Latin Empire (western Turkey), but never uses the title of Emperor.
- August 20 – King Richard II summons the English Parliament five months after the adjournment of the last session, and directs the members to assemble at Westminster on October 26.
- August 27 – (End of Tawthalin 745 ME) Queen Maha Devi gives word to the army of Hanthawaddy that she will suppress the rebellion by Prince Binnya Nwe, with an attack to be launched at the end of Burma's rainy season.
- September 12 – Shortly before his death, King Fernando I of Portugal creates the kingdom's first police force, the Quadrilheiros, initially consisting of 20 of the strongest men in Lisbon, and gives them the authority to arrest criminals. The concept of a city police force is expanded to other communities and becomes the basis for the Polícia de Segurança Pública.
- September 19 – In Macedonia in Greece, the city of Serres is conquered and occupied by forces of the Ottoman Empire and renamed Siroz. Under the terms of surrender, the Greek population keeps control of the churches and most homes inside the walled city, while the Ottoman Turks settle outside the walls, which are eventually torn down.

=== October–December ===
- October 22 – King Fernando I of Portugal dies, and is succeeded by his 10-year-old daughter, Beatriz. Her mother, Fernando's widow Leonor Teles, proclaims herself the regent A period of civil war and anarchy, known as the 1383–1385 Portuguese interregnum, begins in Portugal, due to Beatriz being married to Juan King of Leon and Castile.
- October 26 – The English Parliament is opened at Westminster for a one-month session. The House of Commons re-elects Sir James Pickering as Speaker of the House.
- October 28 – (3rd waxing of Nadaw, 745 ME) With the rainy season over in Burma, Queen Maha Dewi of Hanthawaddy dispatches armies from Pegu, Martaban and Myaungmya to attack her rebel nephew, Binnya Nwe, at Dagon.
- November 19 – (10th waning of Nadaw 745 ME) The Pegu army of Smin Maru is driven back by the rebel Nwe, while General Zeik-Bye declines to intervene.
- November 26 – The English Parliament adjourns and King Richard II gives royal assent to multiple laws, including "a confirmation of the liberties of the church", a prohibition of exports of weapons or food to the Kingdom of Scotland without royal approval, and the Vagabonds Act.
- December 6 – In a coup d'etat, Count João Fernandes Andeiro, the brother of the regent Leonor Teles and uncle of Queen Beatriz of Portugal, is assassinated by João, Master of Aviz.
- December 7 – Wenceslaus II the Lazy, who is also King of Bohemia, becomes the new Duke of Luxembourg upon the death of his uncle, Duke Wenceslaus I.
- December 10 – (12th waning of Pyatho 745 ME) After breaking through Queen Maha Dewi's last defenses, Binnya Nwe's troops reach the walls of Pegu and forces a stalemate between Queen Maha and Prince Nwe.
- December 16 – As Queen Beatriz of Portugal flees Lisbon toward Alenquer. João, Master of Aviz is declared to be the new regent.

=== Date unknown ===
- The Teutonic Knights recommence war against pagan Lithuania.
- Dan I succeeds his father Radu as Prince of Wallachia. He is the ancestor of the House of Dăneşti.
- Rao Chanda succeeds Rao Biram Dev as Rathore ruler of Marwar (in modern-day western India).
- Löwenbräu beer is first brewed.
- Completion of the original inner courtyard of Farleigh Hungerford Castle in Somersetshire, England.
- The Wat Phra That Doi Suthep Temple is built in modern-day Thailand, by King Kuena of Lanna.
- Construction of the Bastille fortress is completed in Paris, France.

== Births ==
- April 30 - Anne of Gloucester, English countess, granddaughter of King Edward III of England (d. 1438)
- September 4 - Amadeus VIII, Duke of Savoy, aka Antipope Felix V (d. 1451)
- November 9 - Niccolò III d'Este, Marquis of Ferrara (d. 1441)
- date unknown - Pope Eugene IV (d. 1447)

== Deaths ==
- March 1 – Amadeus VI, Count of Savoy (b. 1334)
- March 3 – Hugh III of Arborea
- June 5 – Dmitry Konstantinovich, Russian prince (b. 1324)
- June 8 – Thomas de Ros, 4th Baron de Ros, English Crusader (b. 1338)
- June 15 – John VI Kantakouzenos, Byzantine Emperor (b. 1292)
- July 7 James of Baux, titular Latin Emperor
- October 22 – King Fernando I of Portugal (b. 1345)
- December 7 – Wenceslaus I, Duke of Luxembourg (b. 1337)
- December 23 – Beatrice of Bourbon, Queen of Bohemia (b. 1320)
- date unknown – Radu I, Prince of Wallachia
