= Antonio Guarco =

Genoese doge

16th Lifetime Doge of the Republic of Genoa
- In office 17 August 1394 – 3 September 1394
- Preceded by: Antoniotto di Montaldo
- Succeeded by: Antoniotto Adorno

Antonio Guarco (Cesino, 1360 – Pavia, 16 March 1405) was the 20th doge of the Republic of Genoa.

== Life ==
Antonio was the son of Nicolò, who had been doge from 1378 to 1383. He was presumably born in the family estate in Cesino, a village near Genoa along the via Postumia, where the Guarcos, originally from Parodi, had relocated in the 12th century to establish there a flourishing estate with agricultural land, watermills and ironworks which allowed the family a rapid ascent in State politics within the Ghibelline faction.

Like his predecessors, he suffered from the conflicts between the great families of the nobility. After the end of the Dogeship of his father, the family was exiled and could return only after the ascent to power of Doge Leonardo Montaldo, whose daughter Antonio married in 1384 to celebrate the friendship between the two families. Montaldo, however, died soon thereafter and a foe of the family, Antoniotto Adorno took over the dogeship in his stead. The Guarcos went into exile to Finale Ligure, but Antonio's father, the formed doge Nicolo', was betrayed by his host Carlo del Carretto and subsequently confined by Antoniotto Adorno in Lerici, where he died in captivity in 1385. After the death of his father, Antonio Guarco initially relocated to the Eastern colonies of the Republic of Genoa to dedicate himself to his trades in Cyprus and Rhodes. When his brother in law [Antonio Montaldo] was elected doge in 1392, he returned to Genoa, where he managed to be elected doge in 1394. His election, however, was badly received by the oligarchy and an insurrection ensued. Antonio was deposed and fled from the Republic, finding support and hospitality by Gian Galeazzo Visconti. In 1397, Antonio attempted a comeback, entering the territory of the Republic but was stopped near his family's possessions in Campomorone and Cesino by a militia commanded by the Spinola and Fieschi family. This led to a truce between all parties but the peace was not a lasting one. Antonio went initially to Cyprus, sheltered by King Janus, then to Pavia at the court of Gian Galeazzo Visconti. While he was in Parma planning another comeback at the expense of French influence over the Republic of Genoa, Antonio was killed by the assassins sent by the French governor Jean II Le Meingre in 1405

== Bibliography ==
(IT) Sergio Buonadonna e Mario Mercenaro, Rosso doge. I dogi della Repubblica di Genova dal 1339 al 1797, 2ª ed., Zena, De Ferrari, 2018, ISBN 88-64-05998-9.

== See also ==
- Republic of Genoa
- Doge of Genoa
