= Barriera =

Barriera may refer to:

- Barriera, Liguria, a località within the comune of Mignanego, a municipality of the Metropolitan City of Genoa, Italy
- Brandon Barriera (born 2004), American professional baseball pitcher
