= Mignanego =

Municipality in Liguria, Italy

- Comune
- Comune di Mignanego
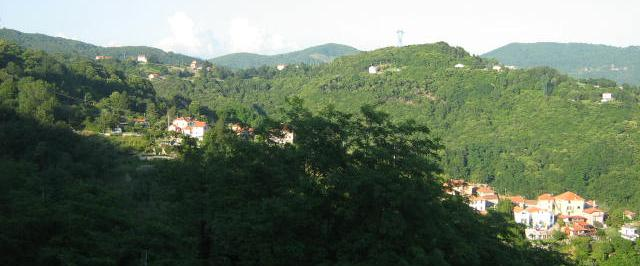

- Coat of arms

- Location within Italy Location within Liguria
- Coordinates: 44°31′N 8°55′E
- Country: Italy
- Region: Liguria
- Metropolitan city: Genoa (GE)
- Founded: 1861
- Frazioni: Fumeri, Giovi, Montanesi, Paveto

Government
  - Mayor: Maria Grazia Grondona

Area
  - Total: 18.4 km^{2} (7.1 sq mi)
- Elevation: 150 m (490 ft)

Population (31 December 2009)
  - Total: 3,727
  - Density: 203/km^{2} (525/sq mi)
- Demonym: Mignaneghesi
- Time zone: UTC+1 (CET)
  - Summer (DST): UTC+2 (CEST)
- Postal code: 16018
- Dialing code: 010
- ISTAT code: 010035
- Website: Official website

Mignanego is a municipality (Italian: comune) of the Metropolitan City of Genoa in the Italian region Liguria, located about 11 kilometres (7 mi) north of Genoa in the northeastern part of the Val Polcevera valley.

== Geography ==
Mignanego borders the following municipalities: Busalla, Campomorone, Fraconalto, Genoa, Savignone, Serra Riccò and Voltaggio (this one in the Province of Alessandria, Piedmont).

It contains four hamlets (frazioni) — Fumeri, Giovi, Montanesi, and Paveto — and eight other villages (località): Barriera, Costagiutta, Migliarina, Pile, Ponte dell'Acqua, Ponterosso, Vetrerie, and Vittoria. Vetrerie is the most populated village and the municipal seat; it is sometimes identified simply as Mignanego.
