= Giacomo Fregoso =

Doge of Genoa from 1390 to 1391

10th Lifetime Doge of the Republic of Genoa
- In office 3 August 1390 – 6 April 1391
- Preceded by: Antoniotto Adorno
- Succeeded by: Antoniotto Adorno

Personal details
- Born: 1340 Genoa, Republic of Genoa
- Died: 1420 (aged 79–80) Genoa, Republic of Genoa

Giacomo Fregoso or Campofregoso (1340–1420) was a statesman who became the 10th doge of Genoa.

Coat of arms of the Fregoso family

== Youth ==
Giacomo's father, Domenico Fregoso, was elected doge of Genoa in 1370. Giacomo himself received an advanced education, became bachelor of law and joined the trading business of the Fregoso family. He also participated in the management of the Maona of Chios. Following some commercial successes, Giacoma participated in the wars led by the Republic, in particular during the conquest of Cyprus of 1373. Back in Genoa, his father gave him the charge of the defense of the Eastern Riviera.

When Domenico was toppled in 1378, the whole Fregoso family was driven into exile. He stayed away from Genoa under the following two dogeships of Antoniotto Adorno and Nicolò Guarco. He only returned in the city when the new doge Leonardo Montaldo promulgated a law of amnesty in 1383. After his return, Giacomo managed to be elected repeatedly to the Council of the Ancients that governed the Republic and the doge Adorno put him in charge of the reception of Pope Urban VI in the city. Later, he was also put in charge of diplomatic relations of the Republic with Amedeo VII, count of Savoy. In the meantime, he kept on pursuing his economic activity, specifically with the Maona.

== Dogeship ==
In 1390, a long-lasting political crisis came to an acme and the doge Adorno had to escape Genoa and seek refuge in Savona. The population in arms gathered and chose Giacomo as the new doge on August 3. Giacomo seem to have enjoyed a reputation as a good manager due to his commercial successes, which may explain his nomination. In 1391, Antoniotto Adorno gathered an army of 800 men to reconquer his lost position. Fregoso, not wanting to begin a civil war, refused to fight, leading to the rebels entering the city unopposed and, on April 6, Adorno was reelected doge.

== Ambassador ==
After his deposition, Giacomo was invited by doge Adorno to a great banquet in his honor and allowed to remain in the city. But rapidly, a riot in Savona drove a wedge between the two clans. As a consequence, Giacomo was sent to the castle-prison of Lerici until 1396. Two years later, he returned to the republic and was re-elected to the Council. He was also nominated as ambassador of the Republic to Florence and Pisa. After Genoa fell under French domination, he continued his diplomatic career in Milan, Rome and finally Venice.

In 1411, at the age of 71, Giacomo received the charge of reorganizing the Genoese navy in order to defend the coasts of the Republic against the raids of North African pirates. No archival traces of him remain after this date and it is usually assumed that he died around 1420 and was buried with his family in the church of Santa Marta.
