= Lago della Busalletta =

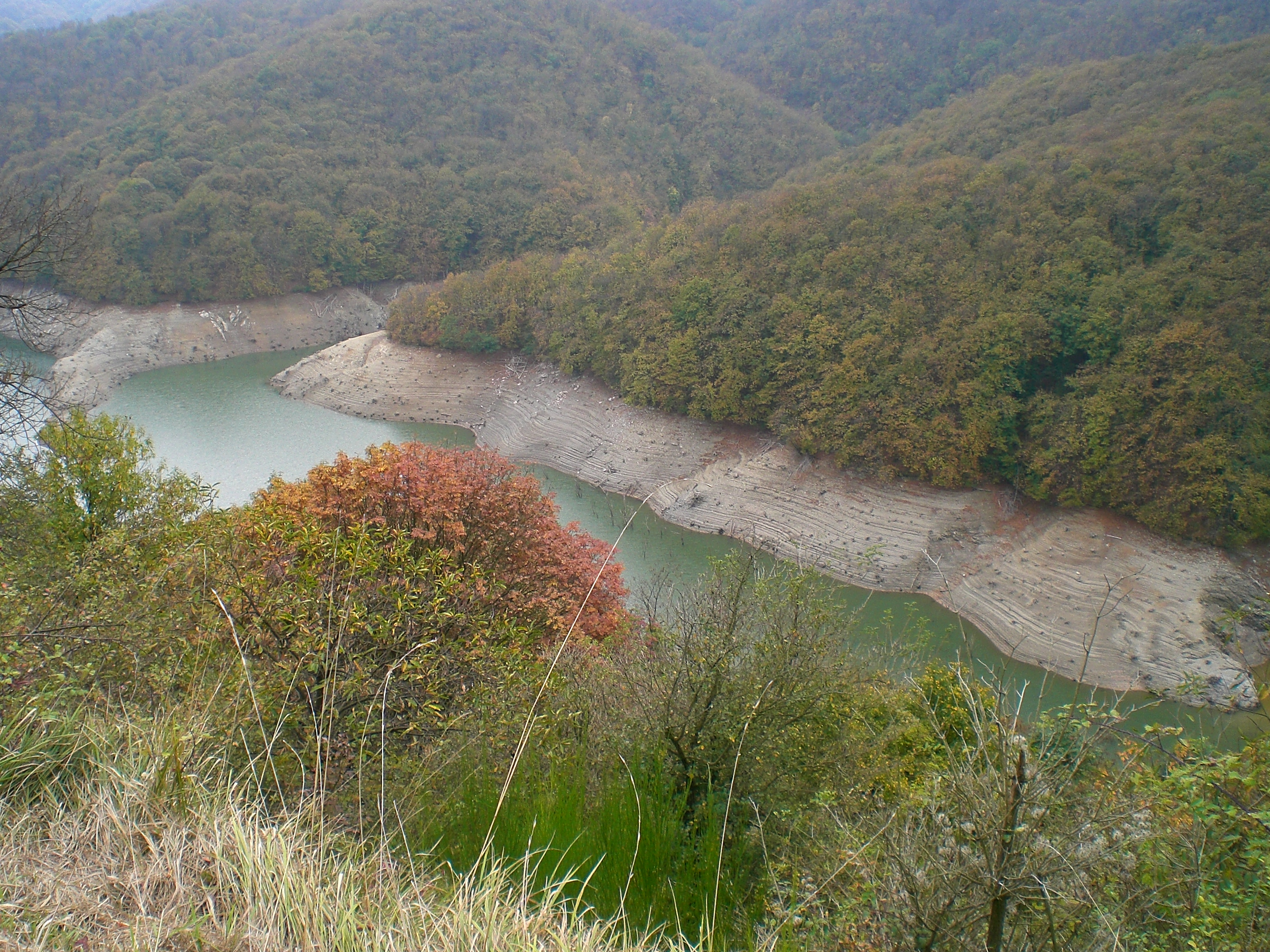

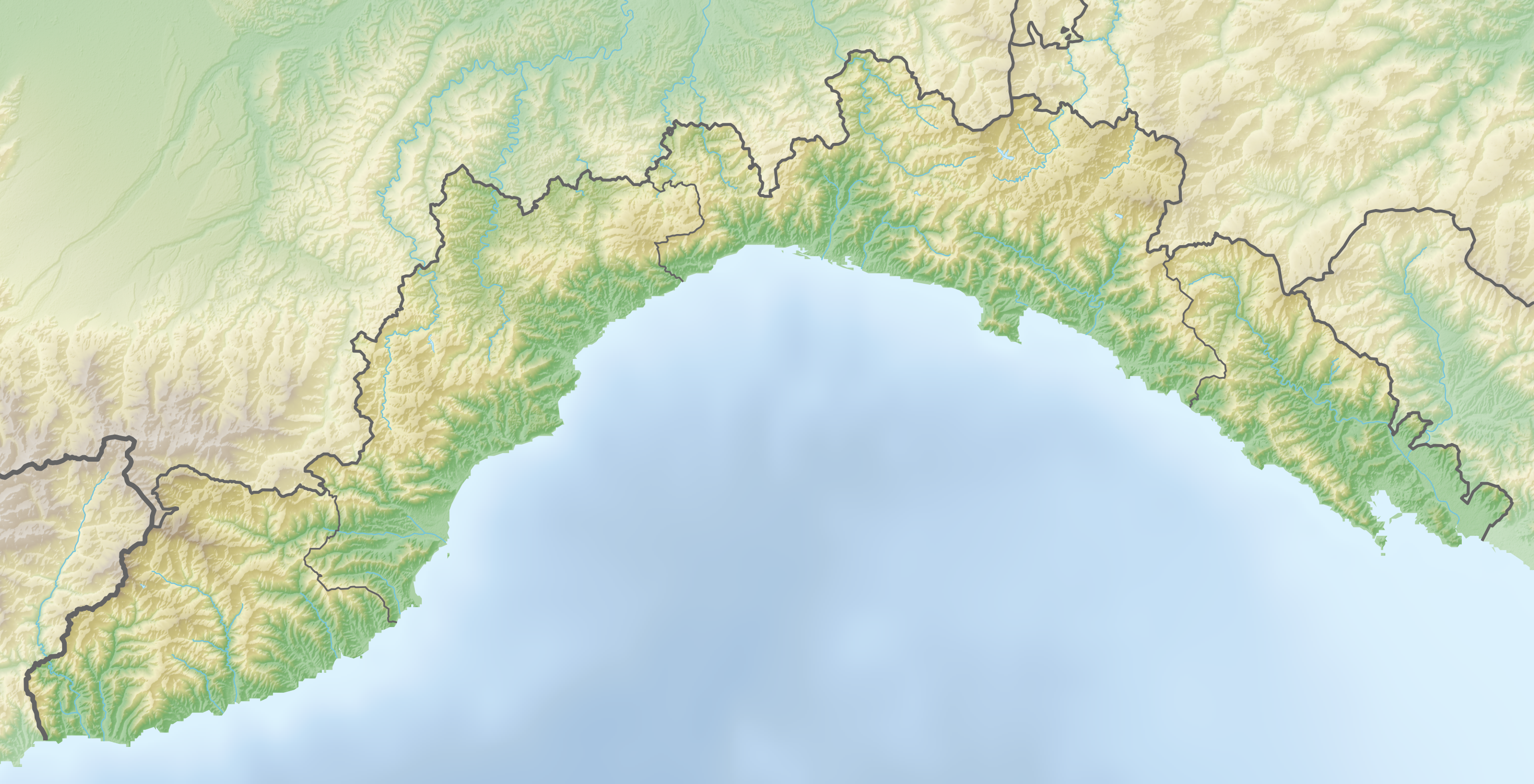
- Location within Liguria
- Location: Province of Genoa, Province of Alessandria, Liguria, Piedmont
- Coordinates: 44°34′03″N 8°55′16″E
- Type: reservoir
- Primary inflows: Rio Busalletta
- Primary outflows: Rio Busalletta
- Basin countries: Italy
- Surface area: 0.3 km^{2} (0.12 sq mi)
- Surface elevation: 441 m (1,447 ft)

Lago della Busalletta is an artificial lake in northwest Italy which straddles the provinces of Genoa (in Liguria) and Alessandria (in Piedmont), near the towns of Fraconalto and Busalla. At an elevation of 441, its surface area is 0.3 km².
