= Campomorone =

Campomorone Campomon
- Comune
- Comune di Campomorone
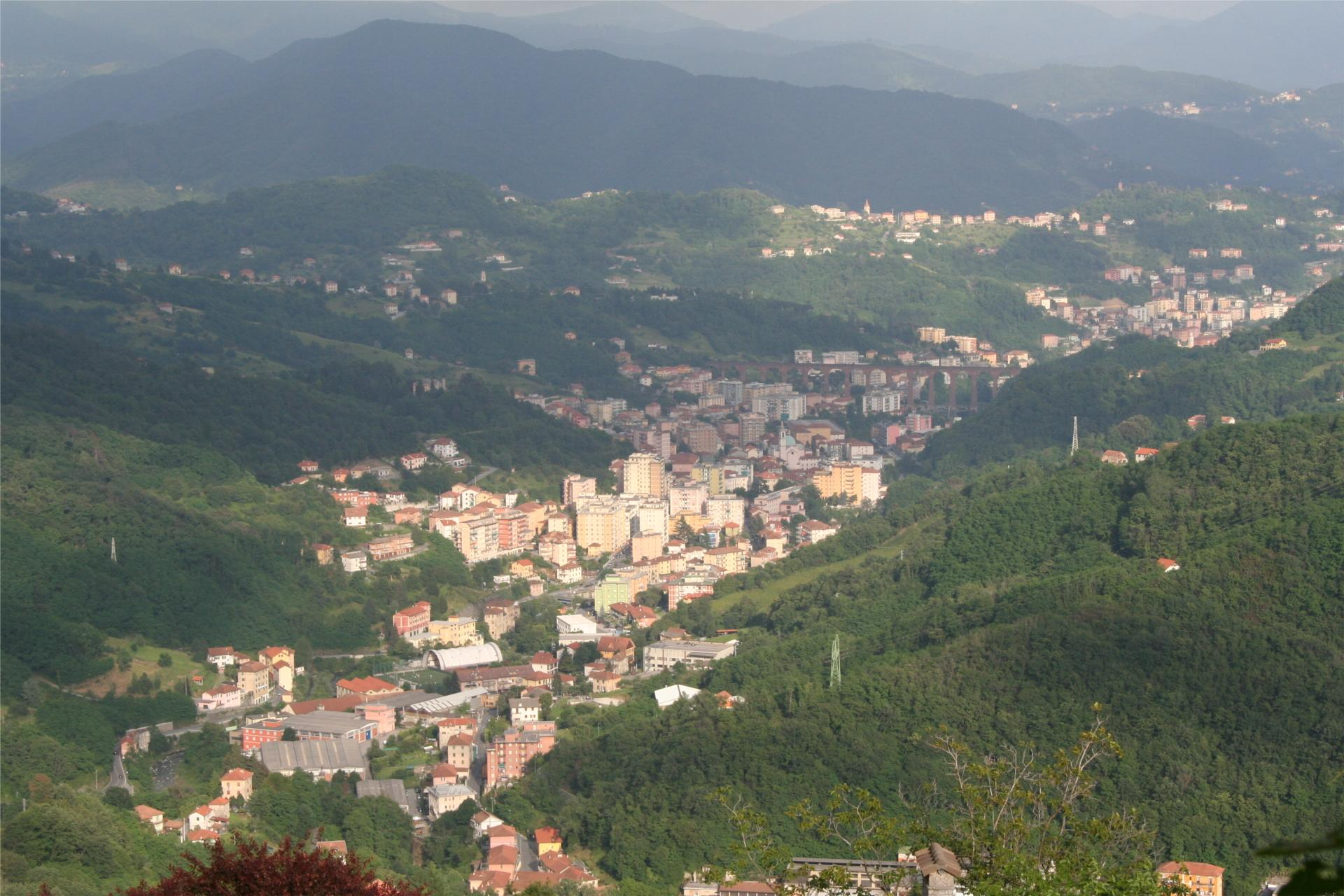

- Location within Italy Location within Liguria
- Coordinates: 44°30′N 8°54′E
- Country: Italy
- Region: Liguria
- Metropolitan city: Genoa (GE)
- Frazioni: Isoverde, Cravasco, Gallaneto, Santo Stefano di Larvego, Gazzolo, Langasco, Pietralavezzara

Government
  - Mayor: Paola Guidi

Area
  - Total: 26.1 km^{2} (10.1 sq mi)
- Elevation: 118 m (387 ft)

Population (31 December 2011)
  - Total: 7,300
  - Density: 280/km^{2} (720/sq mi)
- Demonym: Campomoronesi
- Time zone: UTC+1 (CET)
  - Summer (DST): UTC+2 (CEST)
- Postal code: 16014
- Dialing code: 010
- Website: Official website

Campomorone (Ligurian: Campomon) is a comune (municipality) in the Metropolitan City of Genoa in the Italian region Liguria, located about 10 kilometres (6 mi) north of Genoa.

Campomorone borders the following municipalities: Bosio, Ceranesi, Fraconalto, Genoa, Mignanego, and Voltaggio.

== Transport ==
Campomorone does not have a railway station of its own. The nearest is Genova Pontedecimo, on the line from Genoa to Turin, from which there is connecting bus service to Campomorone.

== Twin towns ==
Campomorone is twinned with:

- San Nicolás de los Arroyos, Argentina (2013)
