= Niccolo Zoagli =

15th Doge of Genoa

15th Lifetime Doge of the Republic of Genoa
- In office 24 May 1394 – 17 August 1394
- Preceded by: Antoniotto di Montaldo
- Succeeded by: Antonio Guarco

Nicolò Zoagli was a Genoese statesman who became Doge of the Republic of Genoa. He took office in May 1394 after his predecessor, Antoniotto di Montaldo, had to flee the city due to the conflict between the local nobility, in particular between the Montaldo and Adorno families. Nicolò stayed in office until 17 August, when he stepped down in favor of Antonio Guarco.
