= Barriera, Liguria =

Coordinates: 44°31′46″N 8°54′54″E

Barriera is a località within the comune of Mignanego, a municipality of the Metropolitan City of Genoa. Although sometimes referred to as a frazioni of Mignanego, Barriera is currently not listed as one by the Metropolitan City of Genoa.

Chiesa di San Bambino Gesù e San Giuseppe

== History ==
The construction of the Giovi road led to the establishment of a post station in Barriera in around 1817. A toll road was inaugurated there in 1822. The establishment that grew up around the post station was known as Armirotti until it acquired its modern name.

== Location ==
Barriera is located on the western side of the Polcevera river, between frazioni Vetreria and frazioni Ponterosso off the Strade Statali 35 (SS35) road.

== Religion ==
The Chiesa di San Bambino Gesù e San Giuseppe, located in Barriera, is a church belonging to the Roman Catholic Archdiocese of Genoa. Its first stone was blessed by the Genoese Cardinal Giuseppe Siri on October 25, 1959. It was consecrated on August 13, 1960.
