= Pietro Fregoso =

13th Doge of Genoa

12th Lifetime Doge of the Republic of Genoa
- In office 15 July 1393 – 16 July 1393
- Preceded by: Antoniotto Montaldo
- Succeeded by: Clemente Promontorio

Personal details
- Born: 1330 Genoa, Republic of Genoa
- Died: 22 April 1404 (aged 73–74) Genoa, Republic of Genoa
- Party: Popolari

Pietro Fregoso (or Campofregoso; 1330 – 22 April 1404) was a statesman who became the 13th Doge of Genoa, serving only a single day in 1393 before ceding the dogeship.

== Biography ==
His birth date is not known precisely but his father was Rolando Fregoso and his mother Manfredina Fregoso. His brother Domenico was elected doge in 1370, and his nephew Giacomo became doge in 1390.

Pietro became bachelor of law and joined the family's business involved in trade with the Orient. On the political scene, he obtained a number of positions including the role of Podestà of the city of Novi and, in 1373, he became admiral of the Republic and was in charge of the conquest of Cyprus. For his success in the Aegean, he was given a palace in Genoa, then ruled by his brother.

On 15 July 1393, at the age of 63, he was elected doge after the ruling doge Antoniotto di Montaldo had stepped down for unknown reasons. But Pietro retained the dogeship only one day and ceded the position the very next day to Clemente Promontorio. After this short episode, Pietro continued his political career, in particular as member of the Council of the commune until his death on 22 April 1404.

His daughter Pomellina was regent of Monaco on behalf of her granddaughter, Claudine Grimaldi.
