= Gabriele Adorno =

Doge of Genoa from 1363 to 1370

4th Lifetime Doge of the Republic of Genoa
- In office March 14, 1363 – August 13, 1370
- Preceded by: Simone Boccanegra
- Succeeded by: Domenico di Campofregoso

Personal details
- Died: 1383 Genoa, Republic of Genoa
- Parents: Daniele Adorno (father); Marietta Giustiniani (mother)

Gabriele Adorno (1320–1383) was the fourth Doge of Genoa. A member of the Adorno family, he was elected on March 14, 1363 to succeed Simone Boccanegra, who had died in office. He remained in the position until August 13, 1370, when he was deposed by the people of Genoa. He was succeeded by Domenico di Campofregoso.

== Early life ==
He was born in Genoa around 1320 to Daniele Adorno di Lanfranco and Marietta Giustiniani. Gabriele grew up in a merchant family and worked as an adult in his father's commercial branch.

== Political career ==
Believed to be a Ghibelline, he was elected in 1350 and 1358 as a member of the Council of Elders. He collaborated with the second doge, Giovanni da Murta in negotiations with the Grimaldi family and with Simone Boccanegra, although the latter had challenged his actions many times. Da Murta wanted to charge Adorno with the difficult task of negotiating a peace with the Aragonese, who were allied with the Republic of Venice against Genoa, along with the intercession of John II, Marquis of Montferrat. At the death of Boccanegra, who had since regained the dogate, Adorno's name was selected by the assembly on March 14, 1363 as the new doge.

One of his earliest actions as doge was distribution of government offices between representatives of the Guelph and Ghibelline factions. He decreed perpetual exile from Genoa for the descendants of the Boccanegra family many of whom were confined in the small La Spezia town of Lerici under the custody of his relative Guglielmo Adorno. In internal and external operations, he had to deal with the increasingly turbulent relations between the feudal families of the Riviera - including the Spinola, Doria, and Fieschi families - and the Del Carretto family of western Liguria where he sent his son-in-law Pietro Recanello. He sought the support of Pope Urban V against the Visconti, sending his brother Giannotto to Avignon.

On April 18, 1365, Genoa signed a treaty with Peter I of Cyprus, which opened a path for the Genoese domination on the island. They increased influence in eastern Europe decisive with the occupation of Soldaia in Crimea and the reinforcement of the local commercial and naval bases. In the next two years, Adorno signed more commercial treaties with the Aragonese in 1366 and with King Ferdinand I of Portugal in 1367.

Despite his efforts to raise Genoa after conflicts with the Aragonese and Venice and the Visconti, the dissatisfaction among the population, particularly regarding taxes, increased in part due to a new political opponent, Leonardo Montaldo, who would later become doge in 1383. Adorno obtained the title of imperial vicar in 1368 from Holy Roman Emperor Charles IV in an unsuccessful attempt to increase his popularity. Another opponent, Domenico di Campofregoso, who Adorno had appointed vicar of the people, succeeded in exciting the crowd against the doge at a public assembly convened in the basilica Santa Maria delle Vigne. Adorno was forced to flee on August 13, 1370. The same day, Campofregoso was elected the next doge of Genoa.

Adorno was shortly after arrested by the new doge and confined at the castle of Voltaggio, and was only released through the intervention of cardinal Stefano Teobaldeschi. He died in Genoa in 1383.

== Marriage and issue ==
He married Violante di Giustiniani Garibaldi in 1347, and they had several children, including:

- Agostino, councilor and elder
- Giovanni, podestà of Gavi (1369), Ventimiglia (1384), and Monaco (1386), and castellan of Caffa in Crimea
- Margherita, married Pietro Recanello
- Luigia, married Luchino Novello di Luchino Visconti

== In the arts ==
Adorno is a character in Giuseppe Verdi's opera Simon Boccanegra; he is the tenor lead, and is the love interest of Boccanegra's daughter. In the opera, Boccanegra names Adorno his successor before dying.
