= Domenico di Campofregoso =

Doge of Genoa from 1370 to 1378

5th Lifetime Doge of the Republic of Genoa
- In office 13 August 1370 – 13 June 1378
- Preceded by: Gabriele Adorno
- Succeeded by: Antoniotto Adorno

Personal details
- Born: c. 1325
- Died: 1390 Genoa, Republic of Genoa

Domenico di Campofregoso (1325–1390) was the fifth doge of Genoa. He succeeded Gabriele Adorno upon the deposition of the latter on 13 August 1370 by the two vicars of the people. He held the longest consecutive term as Doge in the history of the Republic.

== Life ==
Born in 1325, Domineco was the son of Rolando di Campofregoso and of Manfredina Fregoso. He was the last son of a family of six. Like many of the members of the Genoese patriciate, he started his professional life as a merchant and financier. By 1355, he was nominated to the First Council of the Republic with the position of senior councilor. At the position, he led the fight against the noble families of Liguria, specially the Fieschi family. He was then made governor of the castles of Gavi, Voltaggio and Portovenere.

== Towards the dogeship ==
Domenico became vicar of the people and from this vantage position he tried to expel doge Adorno with the spontaneous support of the Genoese populace. The inhabitants of the city were called into the church of Santa Maria delle Vigne and the two vicars stirred the crowd against the recent tax increase decided by the doge. The popular assembly deposed Adorno and Domineco di Campofregoso was acclaimed as the new head of state.

== The mandate ==
The dogeship of Domenico was dominated by the Genoese bid to dispute the sole control of the Kingdom of Cyprus. The Genoese fleet conquered the island in 1372 under the command of the brother of the doge, Pietro Fregoso and even managed to storm the capital city of Famagosta. While the Mediterranean sea was alive with the conflict between commercial rivals, Genoa also had to contend with the restlessness of the Ligurian countryside and North African pirates.

In 1378, while he was fighting off the mercenary company known as the Star, the popular party withdrew its support to the doge and called for Antoniotto Adorno. On 17 June Domenico was deposed and banished from the city.

== Last years ==
Domenico di Campofregoso was exiled along with a number of his parents. In 1379 he attempted in vain to replace the Byzantine emperor, John V Palaiologos, with his own son, Giacomo Fregoso. In 1390, Giacomo was elected new doge of Genoa allowing his father to return to the city. He died the same year and was buried in the church of Santa Marta.

== See also ==
- Arrigo della Rocca
- Republic of Genoa
- Fregoso
