= Antoniotto di Montaldo =

11th Doge of Genoa (1368–1398)

11th Lifetime Doge of the Republic of Genoa
- In office 16 June 1392 – 15 July 1393
- Preceded by: Antoniotto Adorno
- Succeeded by: Pietro Fregoso
- In office 30 August 1393 – 24 May 1394
- Preceded by: Francesco Giustiniano di Garibaldo
- Succeeded by: Niccolo Zoagli

Personal details
- Died: 25 July 1398 Genoa, Republic of Genoa
- Party: Popolari

Antoniotto di Montaldo (1368 – 25 July 1398) was the Doge of the Republic of Genoa on two occasions between 1392 and 1394.

Born in Ceranesi, the son of Leonardo Montaldo, who had also been doge, Antoniotto di Montaldo was elected doge on 16 June 1392, after his predecessor Antoniotto Adorno had resigned. However, for unknown reasons, Montaldo himself resigned on 15 July 1393 in favor of Pietro Fregoso. This occurred during a period of political chaos in the Genoese Republic, and after just one day, on 16 July, Fregoso resigned, to be replaced by Clemente Promontorio; the latter, however, was deposed after a few hours by Francesco Giustiniano di Garibaldo, who reigned for two weeks, until 30 July.

On that date, Antoniotto di Montaldo, after a struggle with Antoniotto Adorno, recovered the dogal title, which he then kept until 24 May 1394. After losing power, he took refuge in Savona. He died in 1398, perhaps in Genoa, and was buried in the church of San Bartolomeo degli Armeni.
