= Antoniotto I Adorno =

Genoese doge

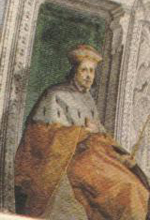

6th Lifetime Doge of the Republic of Genoa
- In office 17 June 1378 – 17 June 1378
- Preceded by: Domenico di Campofregoso
- Succeeded by: Nicolò Guarco
- In office 15 June 1384 – 3 August 1390
- Preceded by: Leonardo Montaldo
- Succeeded by: Giacomo Fregoso
- In office 6 April 1391 – 16 June 1392
- Preceded by: Giacomo Fregoso
- Succeeded by: Antoniotto di Montaldo
- In office 3 September 1394 – 27 November 1396
- Preceded by: Antonio Guarco
- Succeeded by: position temporarily vacant

Personal details
- Born: 1340 Genoa, Republic of Genoa
- Died: 5 June 1398 (aged 57–58) Finale Ligure, Republic of Genoa

The Most Serene Prince Antoniotto Adorno (1340 – Finale Ligure, 1398) was the 6th doge of the Republic of Genoa and rose four times to the nominally lifelong position, making him the person most often elected to the Doge office in the history of the republic.

== Early career ==
Antoniotto was the son of Adornino Adorno and Nicolosia della Rocca. Like most of the previous doges, Antoniotto was a merchant by trade; he was also reputed to be well-versed in law and literature and he is known to have pleaded in at least one case as an attorney. He began his political career as the governor (vicar) of Chiavari in the early 1370s. In 1373, he took part in the successful invasion of the kingdom of Cyprus aboard his own private galley.

== Four times in office ==
=== First dogeship ===
On 17 June 1378 his partisans stormed the dogal palace and forced Domenico di Campofregoso to relinquish his position. Antonietto was elected doge by popular acclamation but, the same evening, his co-conspirator, Nicolò Guarco compelled him to resign and became the new doge in his place. Antoniotto had to leave the city and find refuge at the court of the Viscontis of Milan, sworn enemies of the Republic.

He remained in exile in Savona until April 1383. Once he had returned to Genoa, he quickly started to conspire to oust doge Guarcò. The same year he managed to force his former accomplice out of office but he failed to win the ensuing elections; he was, however, allowed to remain in Genoa and entered the council of the Ancients. On 15 June 1384, at the death of doge Leonardo Montaldo, Antonietto was finally elected doge. One of his first decisions was to have Niccolò Guarco imprisoned in Lerici.

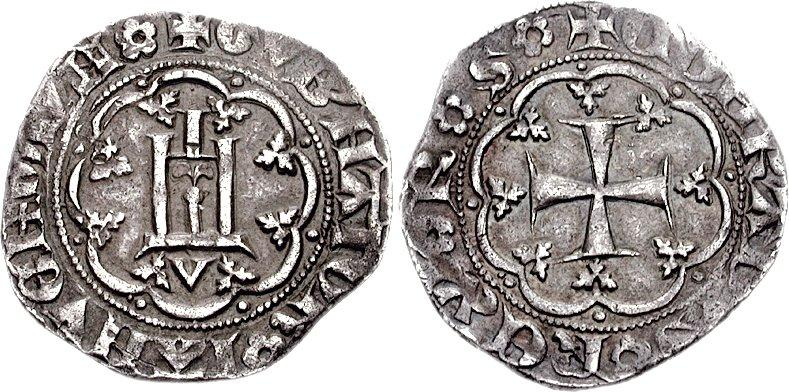
Grosso minted in 1396 while Antoniotto Adorno, was governor of Genoa for the sake of the king of France, Charles VI.

=== Second dogeship ===
On the diplomatic stage Antoniotto Adorno pursued a strategy of appeasement in accord with the mercantile interests of the city. He gave refuge to the controversial pope Urban VI in 1386, and the following year he obtained a peace treaty with the Aragonese king and mounted with him an assault against Barbary raiders under the command of his brother, Raffaele. In June 1388, the Christian fleet conquered Jerba and in 1390 another expedition benefiting from French and English support was launched against Mahdia. After over a year of siege, the doge and the sultan of Tunis came to terms and the latter agreed to stop offensive actions against Genoese trade.

Doge Adorno also strove to maintain the peace in Genoa and in the colonies. He broke an agreement between the embittered maona of Cyprus and the king of the island. However, despite his best effort, the Genoese political life remained highly volatile. On 3 August 1390 he was forced out of office by the armed partisans of Giacomo Fregoso, son of the former doge Domenico di Campofregoso. But Giacomo was bookish and seemed to have little appetite for politics, so on 6 April 1391 Antoniotto came back to the dogal palace, took Giacomo to dinner, brought him home and assumed the dogeship anew.

=== Third dogeship ===
Antoniotto resumed his politics of appeasement in the region. On 20 January 1391 he brokered a peace treaty between Milan and its enemies, Venice, Florence and Bologna. However, his failure to subdue the old rival neighbour, Savona, triggered a rebellion on 15 June 1392 and forced him to flee the city. Backed militarily by Gian Galeazzo Visconti, he attempted to re-conquer his position but was defeated by the new doge, Antoniotto Montaldo.

=== Fourth dogeship ===
Despite this set back, he managed to force the new doge to give him the control of the city, albeit at the condition he would not try to regain his former office. Yet, on 3 September 1394, Antoniotto Adorno secretly gathered an assembly and was elected doge for the fourth time.

A new danger arose when, on 17 November 1394, confronted with internal strife and rather than remaining under Genoese domination, the neighbouring city of Savona gave itself to the king of France. Antoniotto confronted with the danger of the rise of a French-backed Savona, in his turn offered the sovereignty of Genoa to the king. Charles VI had entrusted his Ligurian expansion to his brother, Louis of Orléans. But the latter quickly arose hatred among the Genoese noblemen as he tried to manage directly the affairs of the city. A riot led by Antoniotto Adorno and Antoniotto Montaldo rapidly forced him to relinquish his new estate, and on 27 November 1396 Antoniotto abandoned the dogeship to become governor in the name of the king.

== End of life ==
On 18 March 1397 Antoniotto relinquished his position of governor and went into retirement on the estates of the marquis Del Carretto in Finale Ligure. There he contracted the plague and died on 5 June 1398.

=== Descent and titles ===
Antoniotto Adorno married twice, with Luchina Savignone then with Ginevra Doria, and had 15 children. Through his daughter Brigida, he is also the ancestor of the Pisan patrician families Adorni, Adornetto and Adorni Braccesi.

Besides the dogeship, Antoniotto was also baron of the kingdoms of Sicily and Jerusalem, lord of Grimault, Saint-Tropez, Arroscia and Scrivia.

== See also ==
- Church of San Francesco Grande
