= Francesco Giustiniano di Garibaldo =

Doge of the Republic of Genoa in 1393

14th Lifetime Doge of the Republic of Genoa
- In office 16 July 1393 – 30 July 1393
- Preceded by: Clemente Promontorio
- Succeeded by: Antoniotto di Montaldo

Francesco Giustiniano di Garibaldo was a statesman who became doge of the Republic of Genoa. He was elected doge on 16 July 1393 after his predecessor was forced to step down after only one day in office. He himself remained in office only two weeks until the exiled Montaldo family returned and Antoniotto di Montaldo was elected as the new doge.
