= Nicolò Guarco =

Genoese statesman

7th Lifetime Doge of the Republic of Genoa
- In office 17 June 1378 – 7 April 1383
- Preceded by: Antoniotto Adorno
- Succeeded by: Federico di Pagana

Personal details
- Born: c.1325 Cesino, Republic of Genoa
- Died: c.1385 Lerici, Republic of Genoa
- Party: Popolani
- Spouse: Linò Onza

Nicolò Guarco (c.1325 in Cesino, near Genoa – c.1385 in Lerici) was a Genoese statesman who became the 7th doge of the Republic of Genoa and led the Republic through the War of Chioggia against Venice.

== Early life ==
Son of the merchant Montanaro Guarco, Nicolò was presumably born in the family estate in Cesino, a village near Genoa along the via Postumia, where the Guarcos, originally from Parodi, had relocated in the 12th century to establish there a flourishing estate with agricultural land, watermills and ironworks which allowed the family a rapid ascent in State politics within the Ghibelline faction.

Nicolò appears first in the documents, in 1351, as a Genoese ambassador sent to the king of France, John II. The same year, he is for the first time made a member of the council of the ancients, the closest advisors to the doge. In 1365, he is given the office of vicar (governor) of the city of Chiavari. He is soon after put in charge of the harbour and re-integrates the council of the ancients. During the 1360s, he seems to have been one of the main opponents of the new doge, Gabriele Adorno.

After the end of the dogeship of Adorno, Nicolò returned to the highest functions in the Genoese state. In 1371, he was sent as ambassador to Portugal. The following year, he took the castle of Roccatagliata from the rebel nobles of the Fieschi family. He then occupied numerous positions within the Genoese government, in particular, he was elected a third time to the council and sent as ambassador to the pope in Avignon. In 1375, he also became one of the shareholders of the maona di Cipro, an association in charge of capturing the island of Cyprus.

At the time, the power of the popolani over the city was under the threat of a three-way alliance between the Venetian Republic, the Viscontis of Milan and the Genoese nobles who intended to regain the upper hand over the affairs of the city. The threat materialized in 1378, when the mercenaries of the company of the Star paid by the duke of Milan took control of the Genoese countryside. The city was in turmoil and, on June 17, the crowd stormed the dogal palace and elected Antoniotto Adorno as the new doge. But the leaders of the popolani party were wary of the ambitious young Adorno and, a few hours later, the elected Nicolò Guarco the new doge of the Republic.

== Dogeship ==
To concentrate the forces of the city on the challenge posed by the Venetians, Nicolò farmed out the administration (and pacification) of the island of Corsica to yet another maona. Even more importantly, on 22 September the doge signed with the representative of the noble exiles an agreement associating them to the government of the Republic, simply barring them from the position of doge. This treaty allowed to solve the problem of the scheming fuorusciti which had plagued the Republic since its creation in 1339.

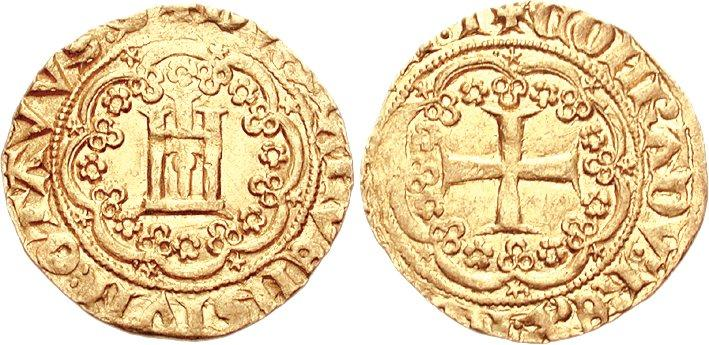
it:Genovino minted under the dogeship of Nicolò Guarco (c.1378)

The doge came to an agreement with the employers of the company of the Star and tried to pay the mercenaries so that they would leave the Ligurian countryside. But Venetian gold quickly brought the mercenaries back under the walls of the city. Finally, on 24 September 1379, the troops of the Republic backed by the noble militias crushed the mercenaries. Nicolò was now free to turn the re-invigorated forces of Genoa against Venice.

On 6 August 1379 the allied troops of Genoa, Hungary, Austria, Carrara and Aquileia managed to take the island of Chioggia in the Venetian laguna, forcing the city to demand terms. But the conditions asked by the Genoese admiral Pietro Doria were so severe that the Venetians decided to resume fighting. The Venetians managed to engineer a counter-attack, and by 26 June 1380 the Genoese troops in the laguna had to surrender.

== Pushed out of office ==
The defeat triggered a series of rebellions among the noble families of the countryside. The doge managed to squash them but the mounting cost of the war was starting to create unrest within the city itself. Meanwhile, changes imposed upon the judicial administration and the augmentation of the number of body guards were feeding fears that the doge was aiming at creating an autocratic power base for himself. Confronted with mounting criticism, the doge was forced to expel his noble allies from government, decrease taxes and call back his exiled political enemies, the Fregoso and the Adorno.

Antoniotto Adorno quickly gained the heart of the people, and on 6 April 1383 he forced Nicolò Guarco to abandon the dogeship (but not to be elected doge after him). Guarco fled the city with his son Antonio and his brothers Isnardo and Lodovico, and found refuge in Finale. Soon after, the new doge, Leonardo Montaldo, allowed him to return to Genoa. A new plague ravaged the city in 1384, the doge succumbed to the disease and this time Antoniotto Adorno managed to get elected. Nicolò, once more, headed towards Finale, but the local lord, the marquis Del Carretto, had changed camp and he delivered him to the new doge. Nicolò was sent to the castle of Lirici as a prisoner and died there maybe as early as the summer of 1384.

== Bibliography ==
(IT) Sergio Buonadonna e Mario Mercenaro, Rosso doge. I dogi della Repubblica di Genova dal 1339 al 1797, 2ª ed., Zena, De Ferrari, 2018, ISBN 88-64-05998-9.

== See also ==
- Republic of Genoa
- Doge of Genoa
