= Federico di Pagana =

Genoese doge

8th Lifetime Doge of the Republic of Genoa
- In office 7 April 1383 – 7 April 1383
- Preceded by: Nicolò Guarco
- Succeeded by: Leonardo Montaldo

Personal details
- Born: 1315 it:San Michele di Pagana, Republic of Genoa
- Died: 1406 (aged 91) Genoa, Republic of Genoa
- Party: Popolani

Federico di Pagana was the 8th Lifetime Doge of the Republic of Genoa. He was chosen as doge after Nicolò Guarco was forced out of office on 7 April 1383.

Pagana came from the region of Rapallo on the Genoese Riviera, so it remains unclear why he was chosen as doge. However, soon after his appointment, Leonardo Montaldo maneuvered to have the election canceled and to be picked instead as the new doge.

After this episode, Federico di Pagana disappeared from the forefront of Genoese politics.

== Bibliography ==
- Sergio Buonadonna, Mario Mercenaro, Rosso Doge. I dogi della Repubblica di Genova dal 1339 al 1797, Genova, De Ferrari Editori, 2007. ISBN 9788864059983
