= Fraconalto =

- Comune
- Comune di Fraconalto
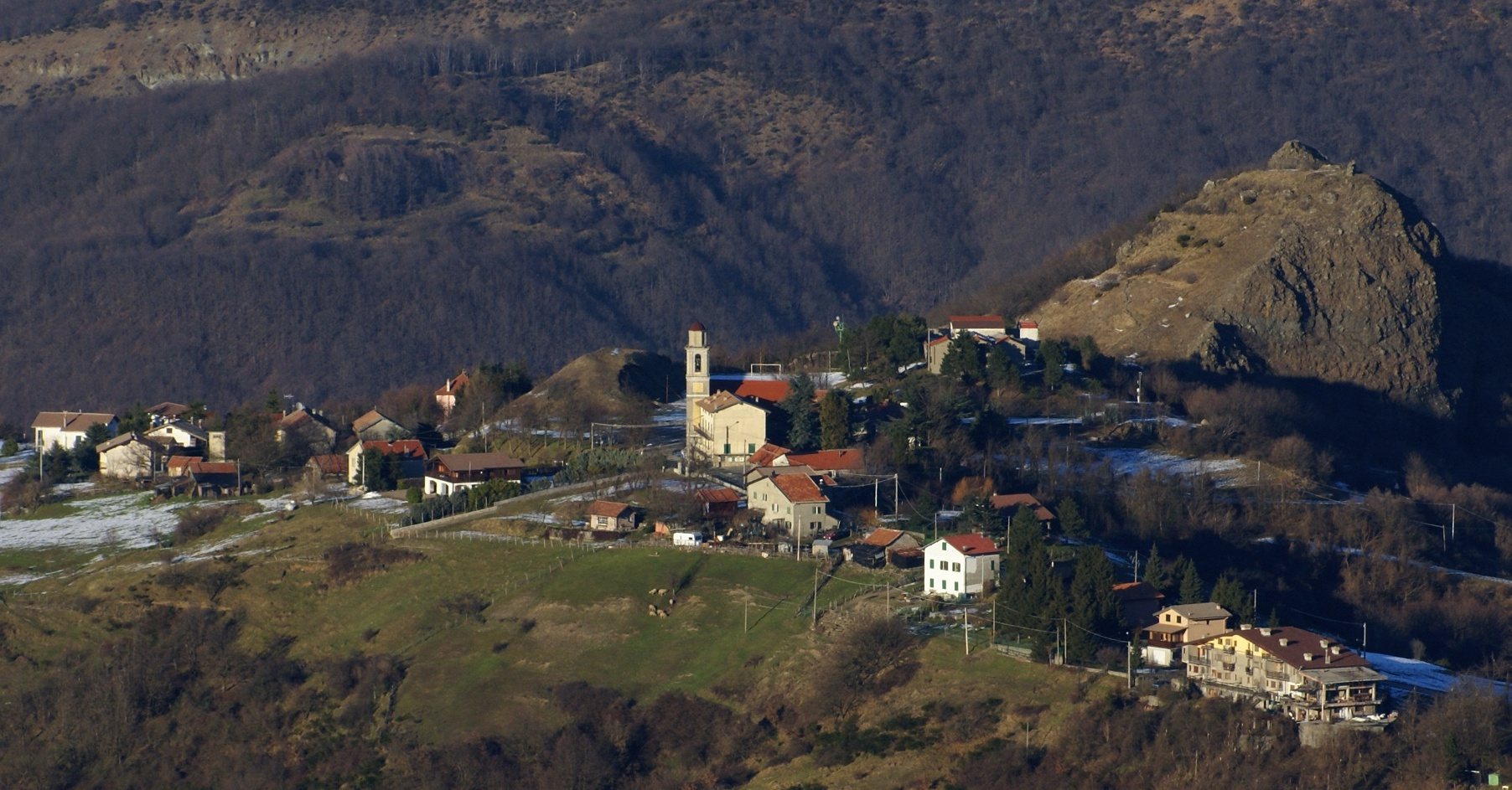

- Coat of arms

- Location within Italy Location within Piedmont
- Coordinates: 44°35′N 8°52′E
- Country: Italy
- Region: Piedmont
- Province: Alessandria (AL)
- Frazioni: Castagnola, Freccia, Molini, Tegli

Government
  - Mayor: Andrea Bagnasco

Area
  - Total: 15.8 km^{2} (6.1 sq mi)
- Elevation: 725 m (2,379 ft)

Population (31 December 2008)
  - Total: 371
  - Density: 23.5/km^{2} (60.8/sq mi)
- Demonym: Fraconaltesi
- Time zone: UTC+1 (CET)
  - Summer (DST): UTC+2 (CEST)
- Postal code: 15060
- Dialing code: 010

Fraconalto (until 1927, Fiaccone) is a comune (municipality) in the Province of Alessandria in the Italian region Piedmont, located about 110 kilometres (68 mi) southeast of Turin and about 40 kilometres (25 mi) southeast of Alessandria and 20 kilometres (12 mi) from Genoa-Pontedecimo.

It is in the Ligurian Apennines, near the Bocchetta Pass in the upper Val Lemme. Nearby is the artificial Lake Busalletta.

== See also ==
- Parco naturale delle Capanne di Marcarolo
