= Clemente Promontorio =

14th Doge of Genoa

13th Lifetime Doge of the Republic of Genoa
- In office 15 July 1393 – 16 July 1393
- Preceded by: Pietro Fregoso
- Succeeded by: Francesco Giustiniano di Garibaldo

Clemente Promontorio or Clemente di Promontorio was a statesman who was elected the fourteenth Doge of the Republic of Genoa on 15 July 1393, after Pietro Fregoso, who had been elected the day before, had stepped down. Clemente himself was deposed the day after his election by Francesco Giustiniano di Garibaldo.
