= Leonardo Montaldo =

7th Doge of Genoa from 1383 to 1384

9th Lifetime Doge of the Republic of Genoa
- In office 7 April 1383 – 14 June 1384
- Preceded by: Federico di Pagana
- Succeeded by: Antoniotto Adorno

Personal details
- Born: 1319 Ceranesi, Republic of Genoa
- Died: 14 June 1384 (aged 64–65) Genoa, Republic of Genoa
- Party: Popolani

Leonardo Montaldo or di Montaldo (1319 – 14 June 1384) was a statesman who became the 7th doge of the Republic of Genoa.

Leonardo was born in San Martino di Paravanico, near modern-day Ceranesi in the Polcevera valley. His family was from Gavi. Little is known of his life before the dogate. He was elected by a commission despite the fact that a large share of the population supported Antoniotto Adorno. According to some sources, Montaldo had accepted to rule the Republic only for six months, although his term went past six months.

Once in office, like his predecessors, Montaldo tried to reorganize the Republic and in particular the fiscal system. But on 11 June 1384 it became clear that he had contracted the plague during an outbreak in the city and he died in Genoa three days later. Antoniotto Adorno was elected doge the next day.
