= List of state leaders in the 15th-century Holy Roman Empire =

This is a list of state leaders in the 15th century (1401–1500) AD, of the Holy Roman Empire.

== Main ==
Holy Roman Empire in Germany

- Holy Roman Empire, Kingdom of Germany (complete list, complete list) –

- Rupert, King (1400–1410)
- Jobst of Moravia, contested King (1410–1411)
- Sigismund, Holy Roman Emperor (1433–1437), King (1410–1437)
- Albert II, King (1438–1439)
- Frederick III, Holy Roman Emperor (1452–1493), King (1440–1493)
- Maximilian I, Emperor Elect (1508–1519), King (1486–1519)

== Austrian ==
- Duchy/ Archduchy of Austria (complete list) –

- Albert IV the Patient, Duke (1395–1404)
- Albert V, Duke (1404–1439)
- Ladislaus I the Posthumous, Duke (1440–1453), Archduke (1453–1457)
- Frederick V the Peaceful, Archduke (1457–1493)
- Maximilian I the Last Knight, Archduke (1493–1519)

- Prince-Bishopric of Brixen (complete list) –

- Ulrich Prustl, Prince-bishop (1396–1417)
- Sebastian Stempfl, Prince-bishop (1417–1418)
- Bertold of Bückelsburg, Prince-bishop (1418–1427)
- Ulrich Putsch, Prince-bishop (1427–1437)
- Georg of Stubai, Prince-bishop (1437–1443)
- Johann Röttel, Prince-bishop (1444–1450)
- Nicholas of Cusa, Prince-bishop (1450–1464)
- Francesco Gonzaga, Prince-bishop (1464–1488)
- Melchior von Meckau, Prince-bishop (1488–1509)

- Duchy of Carinthia (complete list) –

- William, Duke (1386–1406)
- Ernest, Duke (1406–1424)
- Frederick, Duke (1424–1493)
- Maximilian I, Duke (1493–1519)

- Prince-Bishopric of Chur (complete list) –

- Hartmann II. Graf von Werdenberg-Sargans, Prince-bishop (1388–1416)
- Johannes III. Ambundi, Prince-bishop (1416–1418)
- Johannes IV. Naso, Prince-bishop (1418–1440)
- Konrad von Rechberg, Administrator (1440–1441)
- Heinrich IV Freiherr von Hewen, Administrator (1441–1456)
- Antonius de Tosabeciis, appointed Prince-bishop (1456)
- Leonhard Wismair, Prince-bishop-elect (1456–1458)
- Ortlieb von Brandis, Prince-bishop (1458–1491)
- Heinrich V. von Hewen, Prince-bishop (1491–1505)

- Fürstenberg-Fürstenberg (complete list) –

- Henry VII, Count (1408–1441)

- County of Gorizia (complete list) –

- Henry VI, Count (1385–1454)
- John II, Count (1454–1462)
- Leonhard, Count (1454–1500)

- Prince-Archbishopric of Salzburg (complete list) –

- Gregor Schenk of Osterwitz, Prince-archbishop (1396–1403)
- Eberhard III of Neuhaus, Prince-archbishop (1403–1427)
- Eberhard IV of Starhemberg, Prince-archbishop (1427–1429)
- John II of Reichensperg, Prince-archbishop (1429–1441)
- Frederick IV Truchseß of Emmerberg, Prince-archbishop (1441–1452)
- Sigismund I of Volkersdorf, Prince-archbishop (1452–1461)
- Burchard of Weissbruch, Prince-archbishop (1461–1466)
- Bernhard II of Rohr, Prince-archbishop (1466–1482)
- John III Peckenschlager, Prince-archbishop (1482–1489)
- Friedrich V of Schallenburg, Prince-archbishop (1489–1494)
- Sigismund II of Hollenegg, Prince-archbishop (1494–1495)
- Leonhard von Keutschach, Prince-archbishop (1495–1519)

- Duchy of Styria (complete list) –

- William, Duke (1386–1406)
- Ernest the Iron, Duke (1406–1424)
- Frederick V, Duke (1424–1493)
- Albert VI, Duke (1424–1463)
- Maximilian I, Duke (1493–1519)

- Prince-Bishopric of Trent (complete list) –

- George I von Liechtenstein, Prince-bishop (1390–1419)
- Armand de Cilli, Prince-bishop (1421)
- Ernst Auer, Prince-bishop (1422)
- Henry IV Flechtel, Prince-bishop (1422–1423)
- Alexander of Masovia, Prince-bishop (1424–1444)
- Benedikt, Prince-bishop (1444–1446)
- Theobald von Wolkenstein, Prince-bishop (1444–1446)
- George II Haak von Themeswald, Prince-bishop (1446–1465)
- Johannes Hinderbach, Prince-bishop (1465–1486)
- Ulrich III von Frundsberg, Prince-bishop (1486–1493)
- Ulrich IV von Liechtenstein, Prince-bishop (1493–1505)

- County of Tyrol (complete list) –

- William, Count (1386–1406)
- Leopold II, Regent (1396–1406)
- Frederick of the Empty Pockets, Count (1406–1439)
- Sigismund, Count (1439–1490)
- Maximilian I, Count (1490–1519)

== Bavarian ==
- Duchy of Bavaria (complete list) –

- Lower Bavaria, Bavaria-Landshut, Bavaria-Straubing, Bavaria-Munich, Bavaria-Ingolstadt, Bavaria-Dachau

- Albert I, co-Duke of Bavaria (1347–1349), of Lower Bavaria (1349–1353), of Bavaria-Straubing (1353–1404)
- William II, co-Duke of Bavaria-Straubing (1404–1417)
- Stephen III the Magnificent, co-Duke of Bavaria except Straubing (1375–1392), Duke of Bavaria-Ingolstadt (1392–1413)
- Louis VII the Bearded, Duke of Bavaria-Ingolstadt (1413–1443)
- Jacqueline, contested Duchess of Bavaria-Straubing (1417–1429)
- John III the Pitiless, contested Duke of Bavaria-Straubing (1417–1425)
- William III, co-Duke of Bavaria-Munich (1397–1435), of Bavaria-Straubing (1429–1435)
- Ernest, co-Duke of Bavaria-Munich (1397–1438), of Bavaria-Straubing (1429–1438)
- Louis VIII the Hunchback, Duke of Bavaria-Ingolstadt (1443–1445)
- Henry XVI the Rich, Duke of Bavaria-Landshut (1393–1450), of Bavaria-Ingolstadt (1447–1450)
- Albert III, Duke of Bavaria-Munich (1438–1460)
- John IV, co-Duke of Bavaria-Munich (1460–1463)
- Sigismund, co-Duke of Bavaria-Munich (1460–1467), Duke of Bavaria-Dachau (1467–1501)
- Louis IX the Rich, Duke of Bavaria-Landshut (1450–1479)
- George I the Rich, Duke of Bavaria-Landshut (1479–1503)
- Albert IV the Wise, Duke of Bavaria-Munich (1465–1505), of Bavaria (1505–1508)
- William IV the Steadfast, Duke of Bavaria-Munich (1460–1508), of Bavaria-Landshut (1503–1508), of Bavaria (1508–1550)

- Berchtesgaden Prince-Provostry (complete list) –

- Gregorius Schenk von Osterwitz, Provost (1396–1403)
- Berthold von Wehingen, Provost (1404)
- Peter II Pienzenauer, Provost (1404–1432)
- Johann II Praun, Provost (1432–1446)
- Bernhard III Leuprechtinger, Provost (1446–1473)
- Erasmus Pretschlaiffer, Provost (1473–1486)
- Ulrich II Pernauer, Provost (1486–1496)
- Balthasar Hirschauer, Provost (1496–1508)

- Prince-Bishopric of Freising (complete list) –

- Berthold of Wehingen, Prince-bishop (1381–1410)
- Conrad V of Hebenstreit, Prince-bishop (1411–1412)
- Hermann of Cilli, Prince-bishop (1412–1421)
- Nicodemus of Scala, Prince-bishop (1421/1422–1443)
- Henry II of Schlick, Prince-bishop (1443–1448)
- John III Grünwald, Prince-bishop (1448–1452)
- John IV Tulbeck, Prince-bishop (1453–1473)
- Sixtus of Tannberg, Prince-bishop (1473–1495)
- Ruprecht of the Palatinate, Prince-bishop (1495–1498)
- Philip of the Palatinate, Prince-bishop (1498–1541)

- Landgraviate of Leuchtenberg (de:complete list) –

- John I, Landgrave (1334–1407)
- Albrecht I, Landgrave (1378–1404)
- John III, Landgrave (?–1458)
- Leopold, Landgrave (1404–1463)
- Friedrich V, Landgrave (1463–1487)
- Louis I, Landgrave (1463–1486)
- John IV, Landgrave (1487–1531)

- Prince-Abbey of Niedermünster (complete list) –

- Sophia von Daching, Abbess (1391–1410)
- Katharina I von Egloffstein, Abbess (1410–1413)
- Barbara I Höfferin, Abbess (1413–1417)
- Herzenleid von Wildenwarth, Abbess (1417–1422)
- Anna I von Streitberg, Abbess (1422–1427)
- Beatrix von Rotheneck, Abbess (1427)
- Osanna von Streitberg, Abbess (1427–1444)
- Ursula von Tauffkirchen-Hohenrain und Höchlenbach, Abbess (1444–1448)
- Ottilia von Abensberg, Abbess (1448–1475 mit)
- Margarethe III von Paulstorff, Abbess (1469–1475)
- Agnes von Rothafft, Abbess (1475–1520)

- Prince-Abbey of Obermünster (complete list) –

- Elisabeth II von Murach, Abbess (1400–1402)
- Margarethe I Sattelbogerin, Abbess (?–1435)
- Barbara von Absberg, Abbess (1435–1456)
- Kunigunde von Egloffstein, Abbess (1456–1479)
- Sibylla von Paulsdorff, Abbess (1479–1500)
- Agnes II von Paulsdorff, Abbess (1500–?)

- Imperial County of Ortenburg (complete list) –

- George I, Count (1395–1422), Imperial Count (1395–1422)
- Henry V, Count (1422–1449)
- Etzel I, Count (1395–1444), Imperial Count (1422–1444)
- Alram I, Count (1395–1411)
- Alram II, Count (1411–1460), Imperial Count (1444–1460)
- George II, Count (1449–1488), Imperial Count (1461–1488)
- Sebastian I, Imperial Count (1488–1490)
- Wolfgang, Count (1490–1519)

- Pappenheim (complete list) –

- Haupt I, Lord (1387–1409)
- Haupt II, co-Lord (1409–1439)
- Sigismund, co-Lord (1409–1436)
- Henry, Lord (1439–1482)
- William, Lord (1482–1508)

- Prince-Bishopric of Passau (complete list) –

- George of Hohenlohe, Prince-Bishop (1390–1423)
- Leonhard of Laiming, Prince-Bishop (1423/24–1451)
- Ulrich of Nußdorf, Prince-Bishop (1451–1479)
- George Hessler, Prince-Bishop (1480–1482)
- Friedrich Mauerkircher, Prince-Bishop (1482–1485)
- Frederick of Öttingen, Prince-Bishop (1485–1490)
- Christopher of Schachner, Prince-Bishop (1490–1500)
- Wiguleus Fröschl of Marzoll, Prince-Bishop (1500–1517)

- Prince-Bishopric of Regensburg (complete list) –

- Johann von Moosburg, Prince-bishop (1384–1409)
- Albert III von Stauf, Prince-bishop (1409–1421)
- Johann II von Streitberg, Prince-bishop (1421–1428)
- Konrad VII von Soest, Prince-bishop (1428–1437)
- Friedrich II von Parsberg, Prince-bishop (1437–1450)
- Friedrich III von Plankenfels, Prince-bishop (1450–1457)
- Rupert I, Prince-bishop (1457–1465)
- Heinrich IV von Absberg, Prince-bishop (1465–1492)
- Rupert II, Prince-bishop (1492–1507)

== Bohemian ==
- Kingdom of Bohemia, Margraviate of Moravia (complete list, complete list) –

- Wenceslaus IV, King (1378–1419)
- Jobst of Moravia, Margrave (1375–1411)
- Sigismund, King (1419–1437), Margrave (1419–1423)
- Albert, King (1437–1439), Margrave (1423–1439)
- Ladislaus the Posthumous, King (1453–1457), Margrave (1440–1457)
- George of Poděbrady, King (1458–1471), Margrave (1458–1468)
- Matthias Corvinus, disputed King (1469–1490), Margrave (1468–1490)
- Vladislaus II, King (1471–1516), Margrave (1490–1516)

- Duchy of Cieszyn (Teschen) (complete list) –

- Przemyslaus I Noszak, Duke (1358–1410)
- Boleslaus I, Duke (1410–1431)
- Wenceslaus I, Duke (1431–1442)
- Wladislaus, Duke (1431–1442)
- Boleslaus II, Duke (1431–1452)
- Przemyslaus II, Duke (1431–1477)
- Casimir II, Duke (1477–1528)

== Burgundian-Low Countries ==
- County of Burgundy (complete list) –

- Margaret II of Dampierre, Count (1384–1405)
- Philip IV the Bold, Count (1384–1404)
- John the Fearless, Count (1405–1419)
- Philip V the Good, Count (1419–1467)
- Charles I the Bold, Count (1467–1477)
- Mary the Rich, Countess, and Maximilian, Count (1477–1482)
- Philip VI the Handsome, Count (1482–1506)

- County of Artois (complete list) –

For the preceding rulers, see the County of Artois under the List of state leaders in the 15th century

- Philip I of Castile, Count (1482–1506)

- Duchy of Brabant (complete list) –

- Joanna, Duchess (1355–1406)
- Anthony, Duke of Brabant, Duke (1406–1415)
- John IV, Duke of Brabant, Duke (1415–1427)
- Philip I of Saint-Pol, Duke (1427–1430)
- Philip II the Good, Duke (1430–1467)
- Charles I the Bold, Duke (1467–1477)
- Mary, Duchess (1477–1482)
- Maximilian, Regent (1482–1494)
- Philip III, Duke (1494–1506)

- County of Flanders (complete list) –

- Margaret III, Countess (1384–1405)
- John the Fearless, Count (1405–1419)
- Philip III the Good, Count (1419–1467)
- Charles II the Bold, Count (1467–1477)
- Mary the Rich, Countess (1477–1482)
- Philip IV the Handsome, Count (1482–1506)

- County of Hainaut (complete list) –

- Albert I, Count (1388–1404)
- William IV, Count (1404–1417)
- Jacqueline, Countess (1417–1432)
- John III, Count (1418–1425)
- Philip the Good, Count (1432–1467)
- Charles the Bold, Count (1467–1477)
- Mary of Burgundy, Count (1477–1482)
- Philip the Handsome, Count (1482–1506)

- County of Hainaut (complete list) –

- Adolph of Cleves, Stadtholder (1477–1482)
- Philip I de Croÿ, Stadtholder (1482–1511)

- County of Holland and Zeeland

- Counts complete list) –

- Albert I, Count (1388–1404)
- William VI, Count (1404–1417)
- Jacqueline, Countess (1417–1432)
- John III the Pitiless, Count (1417–1425)
- John IV, Count (1418–1427)
- Humphrey, Count (1422–1425)
- Francis, Lord of Borselen, Count (1432)
- Philip I the Good, Count (1432–1467)
- Charles I the Bold, Count (1467–1477)
- Mary I the Rich, Count (1477–1482)
- Maximilian, Regent (1482–1494)
- Philip II the Handsome, Count (1494–1506)

- Stadtholders (complete list) –

- Hugo van Lannoy, Stadtholder (1433–1440)
- Willem van Lalaing, Stadtholder (1440–1445)
- Gozewijn de Wilde, Stadtholder (1445–1448)
- Jean de Lannoy, Stadtholder (1448–1462)
- Loys of Gruuthuse, Stadtholder (1462–1477)
- Wolfert VI van Borselen, Stadtholder (1477–1480)
- Joost de Lalaing, Stadtholder (1480–1483)
- Jan III van Egmond, Stadtholder (1483–1515)

- Grand pensionaries (complete list) –

- Barthout van Assendelft, Grand Pensionary (1480–1489)
- Jan Bouwensz, Grand Pensionary (1489–1494)
- Barthout van Assendelft, Grand Pensionary (1494–1497)
- Frans Coebel van der Loo, Grand Pensionary (1500–1513)

- Duchy of Limburg (complete list) –

- Joanna, Duchess (1355–1406)
- Anthony, Duke (1406–1415)
- John IV, Duke (1415–1427)
- Philip I, Duke (1427–1430)
- Philip II, Duke (1430–1467)
- Charles I, Duke (1467–1477)
- Mary, Duchess (1477–1482)
- Philip III, Duke (1494–1506)

- County of Namur (complete list) –

- William II, Margrave (1391–1418)
- John III, Margrave (1418–1421)
- Philip IV the Good, Margrave (1421–1467)
- Charles I the Bold, Margrave (1467–1477)
- Mary I the Rich, Margravine (1477–1482)
- Maximilian, Margrave (1493–1519)

== Franconian ==
- Brandenburg-Ansbach, Brandenburg-Kulmbach (Brandenburg-Bayreuth) (complete list, complete list) –

- John III, Margrave of Brandenburg-Ansbach (1398–1420)
- Frederick I, Elector (1415–1440), Margrave of Brandenburg-Ansbach (1398–1440), of Brandenburg-Kulmbach (1420–1440)
- John VI the Alchemist, Margrave of Brandenburg-Ansbach (1440–1457)
- Albrecht III Achilles, Margrave of Brandenburg-Ansbach (1440–1486), of Brandenburg-Kulmbach (1457–1486), Elector (1471–1486)
- Siegmund, Margrave of Brandenburg-Ansbach (1486–1495)
- Frederick the Elder, Margrave of Brandenburg-Ansbach (1486–1536), of Brandenburg-Kulmbach (1495–1515)

- Prince-Bishopric of Bamberg (complete list) –

- Albrecht von Wertheim, Prince-bishop (1399–1421)
- Friedrich III von Aufsess, Prince-bishop (1421–1431)
- Anton von Rotenhan, Prince-bishop (1431–1459)
- Georg I von Schaumberg, Prince-bishop (1459–1475)
- Philipp von Henneberg, Prince-bishop (1475–1487)
- Heinrich Groß von Trockau, Prince-bishop (1487–1501)

- County of Castell (complete list) –

- Leonard, Count (1399–1426)
- William II, Count (1426–1479)
- Frederick IX, Count (1479–1498)
- John III, Count (1498–1500)
- George I, Count (1498–1528)
- Wolfgang I, Count (1498–1546)

- Prince-Bishopric of Eichstätt (complete list, de) –

- Frederick IV of Oettingen, Prince-bishop (1383–1415)
- Johann II von Heideck, Prince-bishop (1415–1429)
- Albrecht II von Rechberg, Prince-bishop (1429–1445)
- Johann III von Eich, Prince-bishop (1445–1464)
- Wilhelm von Reichenau, Prince-bishop (1464–1496)
- Gabriel von Eyb, Prince-bishop (1496–1535)

- Hohenlohe-Weikersheim –

- Kraft V, Count (1429–1472)
- Kraft VI, Count (1472–1503)

- Prince-Bishopric of Würzburg (complete list) –

- Johann I von Egloffstein, Prince-bishop (1400–1411)
- Johann II von Brunn, Prince-bishop (1411–1440)
- Sigmund of Saxony, Prince-bishop (1440–1443)
- Gottfried I von Limpurg, Prince-bishop (1443–1455)
- Johann III von Grumbach, Prince-bishop (1455–1466)
- Rudolf II von Scherenberg, Prince-bishop (1466–1495)
- Lorenz von Bibra, Prince-bishop (1495–1519)

== Electoral Rhenish ==
- Elector-Archbishopric of Cologne (complete list) –

- Friedrich III von Saarwerden, Archbishop-elector (1372–1414)
- Dietrich II von Moers, Archbishop-elector (1414–1463)
- Ruprecht of the Palatinate, Archbishop-elector (1463–1480)
- Hermann IV of Hesse, Archbishop-elector (1480–1508)

- Elector-Bishopric of Mainz (complete list) –

- Johann II von Nassau, Archbishop-elector (1397–1419)
- Conrad III of Dhaun, Archbishop-elector (1419–1434)
- Dietrich Schenk von Erbach, Archbishop-elector (1434–1459)
- Diether von Isenburg, Archbishop-elector (1460–1461)
- Adolph II of Nassau, Archbishop-elector (1461–1475)
- Diether von Isenburg, Archbishop-elector ((restored) 1476–1482)
- Adalbert of Saxony, Archbishop-elector (1482–1484)
- Berthold von Henneberg, Archbishop-elector (1484–1504)

- Electoral Palatinate (complete list) –

Palatinate-Mosbach
Palatinate-Neumarkt
Palatinate-Simmern
Palatinate-Zweibrücken

- Robert III the Righteous, Elector (1398–1410)
- Louis III the Bearded, Elector (1410–1436)
- Stephen I, Count Palatine of Simmern (1410–1459)
- John I, Count Palatine of Neumarkt (1410–1443)
- Otto I, Count Palatine of Mosbach (1410–1461)
- Louis IV the Meek, Elector (1436–1449)
- Christopher I, Count Palatine of Neumarkt (1443–1448)
- Frederick I the Victorious, Elector (1449–1476)
- Frederick I the Pious, Count Palatine of Simmern (1459–1480)
- Louis I the Black, Count Palatine of Zweibrücken (1459–1489)
- Otto II the Mathematician, Count Palatine of Mosbach (1461–1490)
- Philip I the Upright, Elector (1476–1508)
- John I, Count Palatine of Simmern (1480–1509)
- Kaspar, co-Count Palatine of Zweibrücken (1489–1490)
- Alexander I the Lame, Count Palatine of Zweibrücken (1489–1514)

- Nieder-Isenburg (Lower Isenburg) (complete list) –

- Salentin IV, Count (1370–1420)
- Salentin V, Count (1420–1458)
- Gerlach I, Count (1458–1490)
- James, Count (1486–1503)
- Gerlach II, Count (1488–1502)

- Elector-Bishopric of Trier (complete list) –

- Werner von Falkenstein, Archbishop-elector (1388–1417)
- Lenihan von Weideburg, Archbishop-elector (1417–1419)
- Otto von Ziegenhain, Archbishop-elector (1419–1430)
- Rhaban von Helmstadt, Archbishop-elector (1430–1438)
- Jakob von Sierk, Archbishop-elector (1439–1456)
- Johann II of Baden, Archbishop-elector (1456–1503)

== Lower Rhenish–Westphalian ==
- Bentheim-Bentheim (complete list) –

- Bernard I, Count (1364–1421)
- Eberwin I, Count (1421–1454)
- Bernard II, Count (1454–1473)
- Eberwin II, Count (1473–1530)

- Bentheim-Lingen (complete list) –

- Otto, Count (1450–1508)
- Nicholas III, Count (1493–1508)

- Bentheim-Steinfurt (complete list) –

- Arnold I, Count (1454–1466)
- Eberwin II, Count (1466–1498)
- Arnold II, Count (1498–1544)

- Bentheim-Tecklenburg (complete list) –

- Nicholas II, Count (1388–1426)
- Otto VII, Count (1426–1450)
- Nicholas III of Bentheim-Lingen, Count (1450–1493)
- Otto VIII, Count (1493–1526)

- Duchy of Cleves, County of Mark (complete list, complete list) –

- Adolph I, Duke of Cleves (1394–1448), Count of Mark (1398–1448)
- Gerhard, Regent (1437–1461)
- John I, Duke of Cleves, Count of Mark (1448–1481)
- John II the Pious, Duke of Cleves, Count of Mark (1481–1521)

- Princely Abbey of Corvey (de:complete list) –

- Wilbrand von Hallermund, Prince-abbot (1398–1408)
- Dietrich III von Runst, Prince-abbot (1408–1417)
- Moritz von Spiegelberg, Prince-abbot (1417–1435)
- Arnold III von der Malsburg, Prince-abbot (1435–1463)
- Hermann II.von Stockhausen, Prince-abbot (1463–1479)
- Hermann III von Bömelberg, Prince-abbot (1479–1504)

- Essen Abbey (complete list) –

- Margarete I, Princess-Abbess (1413–1426)
- Elisabeth IV Stecke von Beeck, Princess-Abbess (1426–1445)
- Sophia I von Daun-Oberstein, Princess-Abbess (1445–1447)
- Elisabeth V von Saffenberg, Princess-Abbess (1447–1459)
- Sophia II von Gleichen, Princess-Abbess (1459–1489)
- Meina von Daun-Oberstein, Princess-Abbess (1489–1521)

- County of East Frisia (complete list) –

- Ulrich I, Count (1464–1466)
- Theda Ukena, Regent (1466–1480)
- Enno I, Count (1480–1491)
- Edzard I the Great, Count (1491–1528)

- Duchy of Guelders

- Dukes (complete list) –

- William I, Duke (1379–1402)
- William II, Duke (1371–1377)
- Reginald IV, Duke (1402–1423)
- John II, Regent (1423–1436)
- Arnold, Duke (1423–1465, 1471–1473)
- Adolf, Duke (1465–1471)
- Charles I, Duke (1473–1477)
- Mary, Duchess (1477–1482)
- Maximillian I, Duke (1477–1482)
- Philip I, Duke (1482–1492)
- Charles II, Duke (1492–1538)

- Stadtholders (complete list) –

- William IV of Egmont, Stadtholder (1473–1475)
- William V of Egmont, Stadtholder (1475–1476)
- Philip I of Croÿ-Chimay, Stadtholder (1474–1477)
- William V of Egmont, Stadtholder (1480–1481)
- Adolf III of Nassau-Wiesbaden-Idstein, Stadtholder (1481–1492)

- Herford Abbey (complete list) –

- Hillegund of Oetgenbach, Abbess (1374–1409)
- Mechthild III of Waldeck, Abbess (1409–1442)
- Margaret of Brunswick-Grubenhagen, rival abbess 1442–1443
- Margaret I of Gleichen, Abbess (1443–1475)
- Jakobe of Neuenahr, rival abbess 1476–1479
- Anna I of Hunolstein, Abbess (1476–1494)
- Bonizet of Limburg-Stirum, Abbess (1494–1524)

- Prince-Bishopric of Liège (complete list) –

- John of Bavaria, Prince-Bishop (1389–1418)
- John of Walenrode, Prince-Bishop (1418–1419)
- John of Heinsberg, Prince-Bishop (1419–1455)
- Louis of Bourbon, Prince-Bishop (1456–1482)
- John of Hornes, Prince-Bishop (1484–1505)

- Limburg-Broich (complete list) –

- Henry, Count (1439–1446)
- William, Count (1446–1473)
- John, Count (1473–1508)

- Duchy of Luxemburg

- Dukes (complete list) –

- Jobst, Duke (1388–1411)
- Elisabeth, Duchess (1411–1443)
- Anthony, Duke (1411–1415)
- John II, Duke (1418–1425)
- Philip I, Duke (1443–1467)
- Charles II, Duke (1467–1477)
- Mary I, Duchess (1477–1482)
- Maximilian I, Duke (1477–1482)
- Philip II, Duke (1482–1506)

- Stadtholders (complete list) –

- Antoine I de Croÿ, Stadtholder (1451–1475)

- Prince-Bishopric of Münster (complete list) –

- Otto IV of Hoya, Prince-bishop (1392–1424)
- Henry II of Moers, Prince-bishop (1424–1450)
- Walram of Moers, Prince-bishop (1450–1456)
- Eric I of Hoya, Prince-bishop (1450–1457)
- John of Pfalz-Simmern, Prince-bishop (1457–1466)
- Henry III, Prince-bishop (1466–1496)
- Conrad II of Rietberg, Prince-bishop (1497–1508)

- County of Oldenburg (complete list) –

- Christian VI, Count (1398–1423)
- Dietrich the Lucky, Count (1423–1440)
- Christian VII, in), Count (1440–1448)
- Gerhard VI the Quarrelsome, Count (1448–1483)
- Adolph, Count of Oldenburg-Delmenhorst, Count (1483–1500)
- John V, Count (1500–1526)

- Prince-Bishopric of Osnabrück (complete list) –

- Dietrich of Horne, Prince-bishop (1376–1402)
- Henry I of Schauenburg-Holstein, Prince-bishop (1402–1410)
- Otto von Hoya, Prince-bishop (1410–1424)
- Johann III von Diepholz, Prince-bishop (1424–1437)
- Erich von Hoya, Prince-bishop (1437–1442)
- Heinrich von Moers, Prince-bishop (1442–1450)
- Albrecht von Hoya, Prince-bishop (1450–1454)
- Rudolf von Diepholz, Prince-bishop (1454–1455)
- Konrad III von Diepholz, Prince-bishop (1455–1482)
- Konrad IV. von Rietberg, Prince-bishop (1482–1508)

- Prince-Bishopric of Paderborn (complete list) –

- Bertrando d'Arvazzano, Prince-bishop (1399–1401)
- William I of Berg, Prince-bishop (1400–1414)
- Dietrich II, Elector of Cologne, Prince-bishop (1414–1463)
- Simon III, Bishop of Paderborn, Prince-bishop (1463–1498)
- Hermann IV of Hesse, Prince-bishop (1498–1508)

- County of Runkel (complete list) –

- Frederick, co-Count (1403–1440)
- Theodoric IV, Count (1403–1460)
- John, Count (1460–1521)

- County of Schaumburg (complete list) –

- Otto I, Count (1370–1404)
- Adolf IX, Count (1404–1426)
- Otto II, Count (1426–1464)
- Adolf X, Count (1464–1474)
- Erich, Count (1474–1492)
- Otto III, Count (1492–1510)

- Prince-Bishopric of Utrecht (complete list) –

- Frederik III van Blankenheim, Prince-bishop (1393–1423)
- Rudolf van Diepholt, Prince-bishop (1423–1455)
- Zweder van Culemborg, Prince-bishop (1425–1433)
- Walraven van Meurs, Prince-bishop (1434–1448)
- Gijsbrecht van Brederode, Prince-bishop (1455–1456)
- David of Burgundy, Prince-bishop (1456–1496)
- Frederick IV of Baden, Prince-bishop (1496–1517)

- Prince-Bishopric of Verden (complete list) –

- Dietrich of Nieheim, Prince-Bishop (1395–1398/1401)
- Henry of Hoya, Prince-Bishop (1407–1426)
- Ulrich of Albeck, Prince-Bishop (1407–1409/1417)
- John of Asel, Prince-Bishop (1426–1470)
- Berthold of Landsberg, Prince-Bishop (1470–1502)

- Isenburg-Wied –

- William II, Count of Isenburg-Braunsberg (1383–1388), of Isenburg-Wied (1388–1409)
- Gerlach I, Count (1409–1413)
- John II, co-Count (1415–1454)
- William III, co-Count (1413–1462)

- County of Wied (complete list) –

- Frederick I, Count (1462–1487)
- William III, Count (1487–1526)
- John I, Count (1487–1533)

== Upper Rhenish ==
- Duchy of Bar (complete list) –

- Robert, Duke (1354–1411)
- Edward III, Duke (1411–1415)
- Louis I, Duke (1415–1431)
- René I, Duke (1420s–1480)
- Yolanda, Duke (1480–1483)
- René II, Duke (1483–1508)

- Prince-Bishopric of Basel (complete list) –

- Humbrecht von Neuenburg, Prince-bishop (1399–1418)
- Hartmann II von Munchenstein, Prince-bishop (1418–1423)
- Johann IV von Fleckenstein, Prince-bishop (1423–1436)
- Friedrich von der Pfalz, Prince-bishop (1437–1451)
- Arnold von Rothburg, Prince-bishop (1451–1458)
- Johann V von Venningen, Prince-bishop (1458–1478)
- Caspar von Mühlhausen, Prince-bishop (1479–1502)

- Free City of Frankfurt (de:complete list) –

- Rudolf III. von Praunheim-Sachsenhausen, Stadtschultheißen (1389–1408)
- Wenzel von Cleen, Stadtschultheißen (1445–1455)

- Princely Abbey of Fulda (complete list) –

- Johann I. von Merlau, Prince-abbot (1395–1440)
- Hermann II. von Buchenau, Prince-abbot (1440–1449)
- Reinhard von Weilnau, Prince-abbot (1449–1472)
- Johann II of Henneberg-Schleusingen, Prince-abbot (1472–1513)

- Landgraviate of Hesse (complete list) –

- Herman II the Learned, Landgrave (1376–1413)
- Louis II the Peaceful, Landgrave (1413–1458)

- Upper Hesse (complete list) –

- Henry III the Rich, Landgrave (1458–1483)
- Louis III the Younger, co-Landgrave (1474–1478)
- William III the Younger, Landgrave (1483–1500)

- Lower Hesse/ Hesse (complete list) –

- Louis III the Frank, Landgrave (1458–1471)
- William I the Elder, Landgrave (1471–1493)
- William II the Middle, Landgrave of Lower Hesse (1493–1500), of Hesse (1500–1509)

- Isenburg-Grenzau (complete list) –

- Philip II, Count (1399–1439)

- Isenburg-Kempenich (complete list) –

- Simon III, Count (1367–1420)
- John, Count (1367–1424)

- Isenburg-Limburg (complete list) –

- John II, Count (1365–1406)

- Isenburg-Wied (complete list) –

- William II, Count (1388–1409)
- Gerlach I, Count (1409–1413)
- William III, Count (1413–1462)
- John II, Count (1415–1454)

- Leiningen-Dagsburg –

- Friedrich IX, Count (?–1467)
- Margaret, Countess (1467–?)

- Leiningen-Hardenburg (de:complete list) –

- Emich VI, Count (15th century–1452)
- Emich VII, Count (1452–1495)
- Emich VIII, Count (1495–1535)

- Duchy of Lorraine (complete list) –

- Charles II, Duke (1390–1431)
- Isabella, Duchess suo jure (1431–1453), with René, Duke (1431–1453)
- John II, Duke (1453–1470)
- Nicholas I, Duke (1470–1473)
- Yolande, Duchess suo jure (1473)
- René II, Duke (1473–1508)

- County of Nassau-Beilstein –

- Henry II, co-Count (1388–1410)
- Reinhard, co-Count (1388–1412)
- John I, co-Count (1412–1473)
- Henry III, co-Count (1412–1477)
- Henry IV, Count (1473–1499)
- John II, Count (1499–1513)

- Nassau-Saarbrücken (complete list) –

- Philip I, Count (1381–1429)
- John II, Count (1429/42–1472)
- John Louis, Count (1472–1545)

- Nassau-Weilburg (complete list) –

- Philip I, Count (1371–1429)
- John II, Count (1429–1442)
- Philip II, Count (1429–1492)
- Louis I, Count (1492–1523)

- Lower Salm (complete list) –

- Henry VII, Count (1370–1416)
- Otto, Count (1416–1455)
- John I, Count (1455–1475)
- John II, Count (1475–1479)
- Peter, Count (1479–1505)
- John III, Count (1505–1537)
- John IV, Count (1537–1559)
- Werner, Count (1559–1629)
- Ernst Frederick, Altgrave (1629–1639)

- Upper Salm (complete list) –

- John IV, Count (1397–1431)
- Simon III, Count (1431–1475)
- John V, Rhinegrave (1475–1495)
- John VI, Rhinegrave (1495–1499)

- Salm-Badenweiler (complete list) –

- John V, Count (1431–1451)
- John VI, Count (1451–1505)

- Salm-Blankenburg (complete list) –

- Henry IV, Count (1396–1441)
- Frederick II, Count (1441–1442)
- Theobald III, Count (1442–1443)
- Louis, Count (1443–1503)

- Salm-Blankenburg (complete list) –

- Louis, Count (1443–1503)

- Salm-Dhaun (complete list) –

- Philip, Rhinegrave (1499–1521)

- County of Sayn (complete list) –

- John III, Count (1359–1403)
- Gerard I, Count (1403–1419)
- Theodore, Count (1419–1452)
- Gerard II, Count (1452–1493)
- Gerhard III, Count (1493–1506)

- Prince-Bishopric of Sion (complete list) –

loyal to Avignon

- Aymon Séchala, Prince-Bishop, loyal to Avignon (1398–1404)
- Jacques de Challant, Prince-Bishop, loyal to Avignon (1404–1417)

loyal to Rome

- Guillaume IV, Prince-Bishop, loyal to Rome(1394–1402)
- Guillaume V of Rarogne, Prince-Bishop, loyal to Rome (1402–1418)

after schism

- André dei Benzi of Gualdo, Prince-Bishop (1418–1437)
- Guillaume VI of Rarogne, Prince-Bishop (1437–1451)
- Henri Asperlin, Prince-Bishop (1451–1457)
- Walter Supersaxo, Prince-Bishop (1457–1482)
- Jost of Silenen, Prince-Bishop (1482–1496)
- Nicolas Schiner, Prince-Bishop (1496–1499)
- Mathieu Schiner, Prince-Bishop (1499–1522)

- Solms-Braunfels (complete list) –

- Otto I, Count (1349–1410)
- Bernhard II, Count (1409–1459)
- Otto II, Count (1459–1504)

- Prince-Bishopric of Speyer (complete list) –

- Nikolaus I aus Wiesbaden, Prince-bishop (1388–1396)
- Raban of Helmstatt, Prince-bishop (1396–1438)
- Reinhard of Helmstatt, Prince-bishop (1438–1456)
- Siegfried III Freiherr of Venningen, Prince-bishop (1456–1459)
- Johann II Nix of Hoheneck, Prince-bishop (1459–1464)
- Matthias Freiherr of Rammingen, Prince-bishop (1464–1478)
- Ludwig of Helmstädt, Prince-bishop (1478–1504)

- Prince-Bishopric of Strasbourg (complete list) –

- Wilhelm II von Diest, Prince-Bishop (1394–1439)
- Konrad IV von Busnang, Prince-Bishop (1439–1440)
- Ruprecht von Pfalz-Simmern, Prince-Bishop (1440–1478)
- Albrecht von Pfalz-Mosbach, Prince-Bishop (1478–1506)

- County of Waldeck-Landau, Older Line –

- Adolph III, Count (1397–1431)
- Otto III, Count (1431–1459)
- Otto IV, Count (1459–1495)

- County of Waldeck-Waldeck –

- Henry VII, Count (1397–c.1444)
- Wolrad I, Count (c.1442–1475)
- Philip I, Count (1475)
- Henry VIII, Count of Waldeck-Waldeck (1475–1486), of Waldeck-Widlungen (1486–1512)

- County of Waldeck-Eisenberg –

- Philip II, Regent (1475–1486), Count (1486–1524)

- County of Waldeck-Widlungen, Older Line –

- Henry VIII, Count of Waldeck-Waldeck (1475–1486), of Waldeck-Widlungen (1486–1512)

- Prince-Bishopric of Worms (complete list) –

- Echard von Dersch, Prince-bishop (1370–1405)
- Matthew of Kraków, Prince-bishop (1405–1410)
- Johann II von Fleckenstein, Prince-bishop (1410–1426)
- Eberhard III von Sternberg, Prince-bishop (1426–1427)
- Friedrich II von Domneck, Prince-bishop (1427–1445)
- Ludwig von Ast, Prince-bishop (1445)
- Reinhard I von Sickingen, Prince-bishop (1445–1482)
- Johann von Dalberg, Prince-bishop (1482–1503)

== Lower Saxon ==
- Saxe-Mölln (complete list) –

- Eric III, Duke (1370–1401)

inherited by Saxe-Ratzeburg to unite Saxe-Lauenburg

- Saxe-Ratzeburg (complete list) –

- Eric IV, Duke of Saxe-Ratzeburg (1368–1401), co-Duke of Saxe-Lauenburg (1401–1411/12)

- Saxe-Lauenburg (complete list) –

- Eric IV, Duke of Saxe-Ratzeburg (1368–1401), co-Duke of Saxe-Lauenburg (1401–1411/12)
- John IV, co-Duke (1401–1412)
- Eric V, co-Duke (1401–1435)
- Bernard II, co-Duke (1426–1463)
- John V, co-Duke (1439–1507)

- Duchy of Saxony, Albertine (complete list) –

- Albert III the Bold, Duke (1464–1500)
- George I the Bearded, Duke (1500–1539)

- Prince-Archbishopric of Bremen (complete list) –

- Otto II, Prince-archbishop (1395–1406)
- John II, Prince-archbishop (1406–1421)
- Nicholas of Oldenburg-Delmenhorst, Prince-archbishop (1422–1435)
- Baldwin II, Prince-archbishop (1435–1441)
- Gerard III, Prince-archbishop (1442–1463)
- Henry II, Administrator (1463–1496)
- John III, Prince-archbishop (1497–1511)

- Principality of Brunswick-Wolfenbüttel/ Principality of Wolfenbüttel (complete list) –

- Henry I the Mild, co-Prince of Lüneburg (1388–1416), co-Prince of Brunswick-Wolfenbüttel (1400–1409)
- Bernard I, co-Prince of Lunenburg (1388–1409, 1428–1434), Prince of Brunswick-Wolfenbüttel (1400–1428)
- Henry the Peaceful, co-Prince of Lunenburg (1416–1428), Prince of Wolfenbüttel (1428–1473)
- William the Victorious, co-Prince of Lüneburg (1416–1428), of Wolfenbüttel (1428–1432, 1473–1482), of Calenberg (1432–1473), of Göttingen (1450–1473)
- William IV the Younger, Prince of Calenberg (1473–1483, 1484–1491), of Göttingen (1473–1483, 1484–1495), of Brunswick-Wolfenbüttel (1482–1491)
- Henry the Elder, Prince of Brunswick-Wolfenbüttel (1491–1514), co-Prince of Calenberg (1491–1494)

- Gandersheim Abbey (complete list) –

- Lutgard III, Princess-Abbess (1359–1402)
- Sophia III, Princess-Abbess (1402–1412)
- Agnes II of Brunswick-Grubenhagen, Princess-Abbess (1412–1439)
- Elisabeth of Dorstadt, Princess-Abbess (1439)
- Elisabeth, Princess-Abbess (1439–1452)
- Sophia IV, Princess-Abbess (1452, 1467–1485)
- Walburg, rival abbess (1452–67)
- Agnes III, Princess-Abbess (1485–1504)

- Principality of Göttingen (complete list) –

- Otto II the One-eyed, Prince (1394–1463)
- William the Victorious, co-Prince of Lüneburg (1416–1428), of Wolfenbüttel (1428–1432, 1473–1482), of Calenberg (1432–1473), of Göttingen (1450–1473)
- William IV the Younger, Prince of Calenberg (1473–1483, 1484–1491), of Göttingen (1473–1483, 1484–1495), of Brunswick-Wolfenbüttel (1482–1491)
- Frederick III the Restless, Prince (1482–1484)

inherited by Calenberg.

- Principality of Calenberg (complete list) –

- William the Victorious, co-Prince of Lüneburg (1416–1428), of Wolfenbüttel (1428–1432, 1473–1482), of Calenberg (1432–1473), of Göttingen (1450–1473)
- William IV the Younger, Prince of Calenberg (1473–1483, 1484–1491), of Göttingen (1473–1483, 1484–1495), of Brunswick-Wolfenbüttel (1482–1491)
- Henry the Elder, Prince of Brunswick-Wolfenbüttel (1491–1514), co-Prince of Calenberg (1491–1494)
- Eric I, co-Prince of Brunswick-Wolfenbüttel (1491–1494), Prince of Calenberg (1491–1540)

- Principality of Grubenhagen (complete list) –

- Eric, co-Prince (1383–1427)
- Henry III, co-Prince (1427–1464)
- Albert II, co-Prince (1427–1485)
- Ernest II, co-Prince (1440–1464)
- Henry IV, Prince (1479–1526)
- Philip I, Prince (1486–1551)

- Prince-Bishopric of Hildesheim (complete list) –

- Johann I. von Paderborn, Prince-bishop (1399–1424)
- Magnus of Saxe-Lauenburg, Prince-bishop (1424–1452)
- Bernhard II of Brunswick-Lüneburg, Prince-bishop (1452–1458)
- Ernst I of Schauenburg, Prince-bishop (1458–1471)
- Henning vom Haus, Prince-bishop (1471–1481)
- Berthold II of Landsberg, Prince-bishop (1481–1502)

- Holstein-Pinneberg (Holstein-Schaumburg) (complete list) –

- Otto I, Count (1370–1404)
- Adolf IX, Count (1404–1426)
- Otto II, Count (1426–1464)
- Adolf X, Count (1464–1474)
- Erich, Count (1474–1492)
- Otto III, Count (1492–1510)

- Holstein-Rendsburg (complete list) –

- Gerhard VI, co-Count (1384–1404)
- Henry III, Count (1404–1421)
- Henry IV, Count (1421–1427)
- Adolph XI, Count (1427–1459)
- Gerhard VII, Count (1427–1433)
- Adolphus VIII, Count (1427–1459)
- Christian I, Count of Holstein-Rendsburg (1460–1474), Duke of Holstein (1474–1481)

- Duchy of Holstein (complete list) –

- Christian I, Count of Holstein-Rendsburg (1460–1474), Duke of Holstein (1474–1481)
- John, Duke (1481–1513)

- Holstein-Segeberg –

- Albert II, Count (1397–1403)

- Prince-bishopric of Lübeck (complete list) –

- John VI, Prince-bishop (1399–1420)
- John VII, Prince-bishop (1420–1439)
- Nicholas II, Prince-bishop (1439–1449)
- Arnold Westphal, Prince-bishop (1450–1466)
- Albert II, Prince-bishop (1466–1489)
- Thomas Grote, Prince-bishop (1489–1492)
- Theodoric II, Prince-bishop (1492–1506)

- Free City of Lübeck (complete list) –

- Jordan Pleskow, Mayor (1400–1425)
- Marquard von Dame, Mayor (1406–1408, 1416-?)
- Henning von Rentelen, Mayor (1402)
- Konrad Brekewoldt (Bürgermeister), Mayor (1407–1436)
- Hinrich Rapesulver, Mayor (?–1440)
- Hermann von Alen, Mayor (1408–1411)
- Johann Lange (Bürgermeister), Mayor (1408–1409)
- Simon Oldesloe, Mayor (1409)
- Elert Stange, Mayor (1408–1416)
- Johann Growe, Mayor (1411–1412)
- Tidemann Steen, Mayor (1427)
- Hinrich Schönenberg, Mayor (1412–1416)
- Hermann Poling, Mayor (1413)
- Johann Bere, Mayor (1436–1451)
- Johann Klingenberg († 1454), Mayor (1432–1454)
- Johann Lüneburg († 1461), Mayor (1442–1461)
- Johann Kollmann (Bürgermeister), Mayor (1443–1454)
- Bruno Warendorp († 1457), Mayor (1432–1434)
- Wilhelm von Calven, Mayor (1441–1465)
- Gerhard von Minden, Mayor (1454–1462)
- Bertold Witig, Mayor (1457–1474)
- Heinrich von Stiten († 1484), Mayor (1466–1484)
- Johann Westphal, Mayor (1461–1474)
- Andreas Geverdes, Mayor (1475–1477)
- Hinrich Castorp, Mayor (1462–1488)
- Johann Wickinghof, Mayor (1484–1493)
- Ludeke von Thünen, Mayor (1475–1501)
- Bruno Bruskow, Mayor (1479–1487)
- Diedrich Hupe, Mayor (1494–1498)
- Heinrich Brömse, Mayor (1487–1502)
- Hermann von Wickede II, Mayor (1489–1501)
- Johann Hertze († 1510), Mayor (1498–1510)

- Principality of Lüneburg (complete list) –

- Bernard I, co-Prince of Lunenburg (1388–1409, 1428–1434), Prince of Brunswick-Wolfenbüttel (1400–1428)
- Henry I the Mild, co-Prince of Lüneburg (1388–1416), co-Prince of Brunswick-Wolfenbüttel (1400–1409)
- Henry the Peaceful, co-Prince of Lunenburg (1416–1428), Prince of Wolfenbüttel (1428–1473)
- William the Victorious, co-Prince of Lüneburg (1416–1428), of Wolfenbüttel (1428–1432, 1473–1482), of Calenberg (1432–1473), of Göttingen (1450–1473)
- Otto IV the Lame, Prince (1434–1446)
- Frederick II the Pious, Prince (1434–1457, 1471–1478)
- Bernard II, co-Prince (1457–1464)
- Otto V the Magnanimous, co-Prince (1457–1471)
- Henry the Middle, Prince (1486–1520)

- Prince-Archbishopric of Magdeburg (complete list) –

- Albert III of Querfurt, Prince-archbishop (1382–1403)
- Günther II of Schwarzburg, Prince-archbishop (1403–1445)
- Frederick III of Beichlingen, Prince-archbishop (1445–1464)
- John II of Palatinate-Simmern, Prince-archbishop (1464–1475)
- Ernest II of Saxony, Prince-archbishop (1475–1513)

- Duchy of Mecklenburg-Schwerin (complete list) –

- Albert III, Duke (1384–1412)
- John IV, Duke (1384–1422)
- Albert V, Duke (1412–1423)
- John V, Duke (1423–1442/43)
- Henry IV the Fat, Duke of Mecklenburg-Schwerin (1422–1471), of Mecklenburg (1471–1477)
- John VI, Duke of Mecklenburg-Schwerin (1451–1471), of Mecklenburg (1471–1472)
- Magnus II, co-Duke of Mecklenburg (1477–1479), of Mecklenburg-Schwerin (1479–1483), of Mecklenburg (1483–1503)
- Balthasar, co-Duke of Mecklenburg-Schwerin (1479–1483), of Mecklenburg (1483–1507)

- Mecklenburg-Stargard (complete list) –

- John II, co-Duke (1392/93–1416)
- Ulrich I, co-Duke (1392/93–1417)
- John III, co-Duke (1416–1438)
- Albert II, co-Duke (1417–1421/23)
- Henry I Gaunt, Duke (1417–1466)
- Ulrich II, Duke (1466–1471)

inherited by Mecklenburg-Schwerin to unite Mecklenburg

- Mecklenburg (complete list) –

- John VI, Duke of Mecklenburg-Schwerin (1451–1471), of Mecklenburg (1471–1472)
- Henry IV the Fat, Duke of Mecklenburg-Schwerin (1422–1471), of Mecklenburg (1471–1477)
- Albert VI, co-Duke of Mecklenburg (1477–1479), of Mecklenburg-Güstrow (1479–1483)
- Magnus II, co-Duke of Mecklenburg (1477–1479), of Mecklenburg-Schwerin (1479–1483), of Mecklenburg (1483–1503)
- Balthasar, co-Duke of Mecklenburg-Schwerin (1479–1483), of Mecklenburg (1483–1507)

- Duchy of Mecklenburg-Güstrow (complete list) –

- Albert VI, co-Duke of Mecklenburg (1477–1479), of Mecklenburg-Güstrow (1479–1483)

- County of Oldenburg (complete list) –

- Christian VI. (Oldenburg), Count (1398–1423)
- Dietrich the Lucky, Count (1423–1440)
- Christian VII, Count (1440–1448)
- Gerhard VI the Quarrelsome, Count (1448–1483)
- Adolph, Count of Oldenburg-Delmenhorst, Count (1483–1500)
- John V, Count (1500–1526)

- Werle-Güstrow (complete list) –

- John VII, co-Lord (1393/94–1414)
- Balthasar, co-Lord (1393/94–1421)
- William, co-Lord of Werle-Güstrow (1401–1425), Lord of Werle (1425–1436)

- Werle-Waren (complete list) –

- Nicholas V, co-Lord (1395–1408)
- Christopher, co-Lord (1395–1425)

inherited by Hohenlohe-Güstrow to unite Werle

- Werle (complete list) –

- William, co-Lord of Werle-Güstrow (1401–1425), Lord of Werle (1425–1436)

inherited by Mecklenburg-Schwerin

== Upper Saxon ==
- Electorate of Saxony (complete list) –

House of Ascania
- Rudolf III, Duke and Elector (1388–1419)
- Albert III, Duke and Elector (1419–1422)
House of Wettin
- Frederick I the Warlike, Duke and Elector (1423–1428)
- Frederick II the Gentle, Duke and Elector (1428–1464)
House of Wettin, Ernestine branch
- Ernest I, Elector (1464–1486)
- Frederick III the Wise, Elector (1486–1525)

- Anhalt-Bernburg (complete list) –

- Otto III, Prince (1374–1404)
- Otto IV, co-Prince (1404–1415)
- Bernhard V, Prince (1404–1420)
- Bernhard VI, Prince (1420–1468)
- George I the Elder, co-Prince of Anhalt-Dessau (1405–1474), of Anhalt-Bernburg (1468–1474)

merged to Anhalt-Dessau

- Anhalt-Zerbst (complete list) –

- Sigismund I, co-Prince of Anhalt-Zerbst (1382–1396), Prince of Anhalt-Dessau (1396–1405)
- Albert IV, co-Prince of Anhalt-Zerbst (1382–1396), Prince of Anhalt-Köthen (1396–1423)

partitioned into Anhalt-Dessau and Anhalt-Köthen

- Anhalt-Dessau (complete list) –

- Sigismund I, co-Prince of Anhalt-Zerbst (1382–1396), Prince of Anhalt-Dessau (1396–1405)
- Valdemar IV, co-Prince (1405–1417)
- Sigismund II, co-Prince (1405–1452)
- Albert V, co-Prince (1405–1469)
- George I the Elder, co-Prince of Anhalt-Dessau (1405–1474), of Anhalt-Bernburg (1468–1474)
- Sigismund III, co-Prince (1474–1487)
- George II the Strong, co-Prince (1474–1509)
- Rudolph I the Valiant, co-Prince (1474–1510)
- Ernest I, co-Prince (1474–1516)

- Anhalt-Köthen (complete list) –

- Albert IV, co-Prince of Anhalt-Zerbst (1382–1396), Prince of Anhalt-Köthen (1396–1423)
- Waldemar V, co-Prince (1423–1436)
- Adolph I, co-Prince (1423–1473)
- Albert VI, co-Prince (1473–1475)
- Philip, co-Prince (1475–1500)
- Waldemar VI, co-Prince (1471–1508)
- Adolph II, co-Prince (1475–1508)
- Magnus, co-Prince (1475–1508), Prince (1475–1508)

- Electorate of Brandenburg (complete list) –

House of Luxemburg

- Jobst, Elector (1388–1411)
- Sigismund, Elector (1378–1388, 1411–1415)

House of Hohenzollern

- Frederick I, Elector (1415–1440), Margrave of Brandenburg-Ansbach (1398–1440), of Brandenburg-Kulmbach (1420–1440)
- Frederick II, Elector (1440–1470)
- Albrecht III Achilles, Margrave of Brandenburg-Ansbach (1440–1486), of Brandenburg-Kulmbach (1457–1486), Elector (1471–1486)
- John VII Cicero, Elector (1486–1499)
- Joachim I Nestor, Elector (1499–1535)

- Margravate of Meissen (complete list) –

- William I, Margrave (1349–1407)
- George, Margrave (1381–1402)
- William II, Margrave (1381–1425)
- Frederick IV, Margrave (1381–1428)
- Frederick V, Margrave (1407–1440)

- Pomerania-Stolp (complete list) –

- Barnim V, co-Duke of Pomerania-Stargard (1377–1394/5), of Pomerania-Stolp (1394/5–1403)
- Bogislaw VIII Magnus, co-Duke of Pomerania-Stargard (1377–1394/95), of Pomerania-Stolp (1394/95–1418)
- Bogislav IX, Duke (1418–1446)
- Maria of Masovia, Regent (1446–1449)
- Eric I, Duke (1446–1459)
- Eric II, Duke of Pomerania-Wolgast (1457–1474), of Pomerania-Stolp (1459–1474), of Pomerania-Stettin (1464–1474)

- Pomerania-Barth (complete list) –

- Swantibor II the Calm, co-Duke of Pomerania-Wolgast (1415–1425), of Pomerania-Barth (1425–1432)
- Barnim VIII the Younger, co-Duke of Pomerania-Wolgast (1415–1425), of Pomerania-Barth (1425–1451)
- Wartislaw X, Duke (1457–1478)

then inherited by Bogislaw X the Great to unite Pomerania

- Pomerania-Stettin, Duchy of Pomerania (complete list) –

- Bogislaw VII the Older, co-Duke of Pomerania-Stettin (1372–1404)
- Swantibor I, co-Duke of Pomerania-Stettin (1372–1413)
- Otto II, co-Duke of Pomerania-Stettin (1413–1428)
- Casimir V, co-Duke of Pomerania-Stettin (1413–1435)
- council of regency, Pomerania-Stettin (1435–1443)
- Joachim the Younger, Duke of Pomerania-Stettin (1443–1451)
- Otto III, Duke of Pomerania-Stettin (1460–1464)
- Eric II, Duke of Pomerania-Wolgast (1457–1474), of Pomerania-Stolp (1459–1474), of Pomerania-Stettin (1464–1474)
- Bogislaw X the Great, Duke of Pomerania-Wolgast and Pomerania-Stettin (1474–1478), of Pomerania (1478–1523)

- Pomerania-Wolgast, Duchy of Pomerania (complete list) –

- Barnim VI, co-Duke of Pomerania-Wolgast (1394–1405)
- Wartislaw VIII, co-Duke of Pomerania-Wolgast (1393–1415)
- Agnes of Saxe-Lauenburg, Regent of Pomerania-Wolgast (1415–1425)
- Swantibor II the Calm, co-Duke of Pomerania-Wolgast (1415–1425), of Pomerania-Barth (1425–1432)
- Barnim VIII the Younger, co-Duke of Pomerania-Wolgast (1415–1425), of Pomerania-Barth (1425–1451)
- Barnim VII the Older, co-Duke of Pomerania-Wolgast (1405–1450)
- Wartislaw IX, co-Duke of Pomerania-Wolgast (1405–1457)
- Eric II, Duke of Pomerania-Wolgast (1457–1474), of Pomerania-Stolp (1459–1474), of Pomerania-Stettin (1464–1474)
- Bogislaw X the Great, Duke of Pomerania-Wolgast and Pomerania-Stettin (1474–1478), of Pomerania (1478–1523)

- Reuss-Lobenstein (complete list) –

- Heinrich II, Lord (1425–1470)
- Heinrich I, Lord (1482–1487)
- Heinrich II, Lord (1482–1500)
- Heinrich III, Lord (1482–1498)
- Heinrich I, Lord (1500–1538)
- Heinrich II, Lord (1500–1547)

- County of Stolberg (de:complete list) –

- Heinrich zu Stolberg, Count (?–post-1402)
- Botho zu Stolberg, Count (c.1370–1455)
- Heinrich IX zu Stolberg, Count (1436–1511)

- Landgraviate of Thuringia (complete list) –

- Balthasar, Landgrave (1349–1406)
- Frederick IV, Landgrave (1406–1440)
- Frederick V, Landgrave (1440–1445)
- William II, Landgrave (1445–1482)
- Albert, Landgrave (1482–1485)
- Ernest, Landgrave (1482–1486)
- Frederick VI, Landgrave (1486–1525)

== Swabian ==
- Prince-Bishopric of Augsburg (complete list) –

- Burkhard of Ellerbach, Prince-bishop (1373–1404)
- Eberhard II of Kirchberg, Prince-bishop (1404–1413)
- Friedrich of Grafeneck, Prince-bishop (1413–1414)
- Anselm of Nenningen, Prince-bishop (1414–1423)
- Peter of Schaumberg, Prince-bishop (1424–1469)
- John II, Prince-bishop (1469–1486)
- Friedrich von Hohenzollern, Prince-bishop (1486–1505)

- Margraviate of Baden-Hachberg (complete list) –

- John I, co-Margrave (1386–1409)
- Hesso II, co-Margrave (1386–1410)
- Otto II, Margrave (1410–1415)
- Bernard I, Margrave of Baden-Pforzheim (1372–1431), of Baden-Baden (1391–1431), of Baden-Hachberg (1415–1431)

- Margraviate of Baden-Baden (complete list) –

- Bernard I, Margrave of Baden-Pforzheim (1372–1431), of Baden-Baden (1391–1431), of Baden-Hachberg (1415–1431)
- James I, Margrave (1431–1453)
- Bernard II, co-Margrave (1453–1458)
- Charles I, Margrave (1453–1475)
- Christopher I, Margrave of Baden-Baden (1475–1503), of Baden (1503–1515)

- Margraviate of Baden-Sausenberg (complete list) –

- Rudolph III, Margrave (1352–1428)
- William I, Margrave (1428–1441)
- Hugo I, Margrave (1441–1444)
- Rudolph IV, Margrave (1441–1487)
- Philip I, Margrave (1487–1503)

- Prince-Bishopric of Constance (complete list) –

- Marquard von Randegg, Prince-bishop (1398–1406)
- Otto III of Hachberg, Prince-bishop (1410–1434)
- Friedrich III von Zollern, Prince-bishop (1434–1436)
- Heinrich von Hewen, Prince-bishop (1436–1462)
- Burkhard von Randegg, Prince-bishop (1463–1466)
- Hermann von Breitenladenburg, Prince-bishop (1466–1474)
- Ludwig von Freiberg, Prince-bishop (1474–1479)
- Otto von Sonnenberg, Prince-bishop (1480–1491)
- Thomas Berlower, Prince-bishop (1491–1496)
- Hugo von Hohenlandenberg, Prince-bishop (1496–1529; 1531/2)

- Ellwangen Abbey/ Prince-Provostry of Ellwangen (complete list/ complete list) –

- Siegfried Gerlacher, Prince-abbot (1401–1427)
- Johann of Holzingen, Prince-abbot (1427–1452)
- Johann of Hürnheim, Prince-abbot (1452–1460), Prince-provost (1460–1461)
- Albrecht V of Rechberg, Prince-provost (1461–1502)

- Fürstenberg-Baar (complete list) –

- Conrad V, Count (1441–1484)
- Henry IX, Count (1484–1499)
- Wolfgang, Count (1499–1509)

- Gutenzell Abbey (de:complete list) –

- Agnes, Princess-abbess (fl.1437)
- Dorothea Neth, Princess-abbess (fl.1437–1444)
- Ottilia Durlacher, Princess-abbess (fl.1449–1450)
- Ursula Egloffer, Princess-abbess (fl.1478)
- Walburga Gräter, Princess-abbess (c.1478–1503)

- Princely Abbey of Kempten (complete list) –

- Frederick VI of Hirschdorf, Prince-abbot (1382–1405)
- de:Friedrich VII von Laubenberg, Prince-abbot (1405–1434)
- Pilgrim II of Wernau, Prince-abbot (1434–1451)
- Gerwig II of Sulmentingen, Prince-abbot (1451–1460)
- Johann I of Wernau, Prince-abbot (1460–1481)
- de:Johann von Riedheim 1481–1507)

- Königsegg (complete list) –

- Marquard, Baron (1470–1500)
- John IV, Baron (1500–1544)

- Lindau Abbey (de:complete list) –

- Ursula I von Sigberg, Princess-abbess (1466–1467)
- Ursula II von Prassberg, Princess-abbess (1467–1491)
- Amalia von Reischach, Princess-abbess (1491–1531)

- Principality of Mindelheim (complete list) –

- Georg von Frundsberg, Lord (1478–1528)
- Ulrich X, Lord (1467–1478)
- Georg II, Lord (1478–1528)

- Oettingen-Wallerstein (complete list) –

- John I the Solemn, Count (1423–1449)
- Ludwig XIII, Count (1449–1486)

- Weingarten Abbey (complete list) –

- Johann I von Essendorf, Prince-abbot (1393–1418)
- Johann II Blaarer von Guttingen und Wartensee, Prince-abbot (1418–1437)
- Erhard von Freybank, Prince-abbot (1437–1455)
- Jobst Penthelin von Ravensburg, Prince-abbot (1455–1477)
- Kaspar Schieck, Prince-abbot (1477–1491)
- Hartmann von Knorringen-Burgau, Prince-abbot (1491–1520)

- Barony of Westerburg (complete list) –

- Reinhard II of Westerburg (1354–1421)
- Reinhard III of Westerburg, Baron (?–1449)
- Cuno I of Westerburg, Baron (1425–1459)
- Reinhard IV, Baron (1453–1522)

- County/ Duchy of Württemberg (complete list) –

- Eberhard III, Count (1392–1417)
- Eberhard IV, Count (1417–1419)
- Ludwig I, Count (1419–1450)
- Ulrich V, Count (1419–1480)
- Ludwig II, Count (1450–1457)
- Eberhard I, Duke of Württemberg, Count (1459–1495), Duke (1495–1496)
- Eberhard II, Duke of Württemberg, Count of Württemberg-Stuttgart (1480–1482), Duke (1496–1498)
- Ulrich, Duke of Württemberg, Duke (1498–1519, 1534–1550)

== Italy ==
sun of Italy in 1494.

- Republic of Genoa (complete list) –

- Giorgio Adorno, Doge (1413–1415)
- Barnaba Guano, Doge (1415–1415)
- Tomaso di Campofregoso, Doge (1415–1421, first reign)
- Isnardo Guarco, Doge (1436)
- Tomaso di Campofregoso, Doge (1436–1437, second reign)
- Battista Fregoso, Doge (1437)
- Tomaso di Campofregoso, Doge (1437–1442, third reign)
- Raffaele Adorno, Doge (1443–1447)
- Barnaba Adorno, Doge (1447)
- Giano I di Campofregoso, Doge (1447–1448)
- Lodovico di Campofregoso, Doge (1448–1450, first reign)
- Pietro di Campofregoso, Doge (1450–1458)
- Prospero Adorno, Doge (1461)
- Spinetta Fregoso, Doge (1461)
- Lodovico di Campofregoso, Doge (1461–1462, second reign)
- Paolo Fregoso, Doge (1462)
- Lodovico di Campofregoso, Doge (1462, third reign)
- Paolo Fregoso, Doge (1462–1463, second reign)
- Francesco Sforza, ruler (1463–1477)
- Prospero Adorno, Doge (1477, second reign)
- Battista Fregoso, Doge (1478–1483)
- Paolo Fregoso, Doge (1483–1488, third reign)

- Republic of Lucca –

- Paolo Guinigi, Lord (1400–1430)

- Duchy of Milan/ Golden Ambrosian Republic (complete list) –

- Gian Galeazzo Visconti, Duke (1395–1402)
- Caterina Visconti, Regent (1402–1404)
- Gian Maria Visconti, Duke (1402–1412)
- Filippo Maria Visconti, Duke (1412–1447)
- Captains and Defenders of the Golden Ambrosian Republic (1447–1450)
- Francesco I Sforza, Duke (1450–1466)
- Galeazzo Maria Sforza, Duke (1466–1476)
- Gian Galeazzo Sforza, Duke (1476–1494)

- Bona of Savoy, Regent (1476–1481)

- Ludovico Sforza, Regent (1481–1494), Duke (1494–1499)
- Louis XII of France, Duke (1499–1512)

- Principality of Orange (complete list) –

- Mary, Princess, and John I, Prince (1393–1417)
- Louis II, Prince (1417–1463)
- William VII, Prince (1463–1475)
- John IV, Prince (1475–1502)

- Papal States (complete list) –

- Boniface IX, Pope (1389–1404)
- Innocent VII, Pope (1404–1406)
- Gregory XII, Pope (1406–1415)
- Martin V, Pope (1417–1431)
- Eugene IV, Pope (1431–1447)
- Nicholas V, Pope (1447–1455)
- Callixtus III, Pope (1455–1458)
- Pius II, Pope (1458–1464)
- Paul II, Pope (1464–1471)
- Sixtus IV, Pope (1471–1484)
- Innocent VIII, Pope (1484–1492)
- Alexander VI, Pope (1492–1503)

- Duchy of Savoy (complete list) –

- Amadeus VIII, Count (1391–1416), Duke (1416–1440)
- Louis, Duke (1440–1465)
- Amadeus IX, Duke (1465–1472)
- Philibert I, Duke (1472–1482)
- Charles I, Duke (1482–1490)
- Charles (II) John Amadeus, Duke (1490–1496)
- Philip II, Duke (1496–1497)
- Philibert II, Duke (1497–1504)
