= Diederick IV, Count of Limburg Hohenlimburg Broich =

Dietrich IV of Limburg Hohenlimburg, born around 1375, was the second son Diederik III count of Limburg Hohenlimburg and Broich and Lukardis of Broich. He had an older sister Elisabeth and brother Willem I. Elisabeth married Dietrich IV of Volmestein. Willem married Metza of Reifferscheidt Erbin of Bedburg. Dietrich IV married Henrica of Wisch on 3 February 1415. Her father bannerlord Hendrik of Wisch and mother Elisabeth of Bronkhorst belonged to the most important nobility in Gelre. The bannerlords of Wisch had their castle Wisch on the old IJssel near Terborg.. Henrica had one younger sister Elisabeth married to Johan of Volmarstein. This created a double family ties between the Lower Rhine families Of Limburg, Of Volmarstein and the Gueldrian Of Wisch.

Coat of Arms the counts of Limburg Hohenlimburg and Broich

== Contents ==
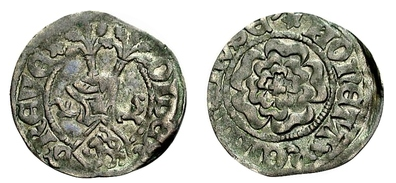
Pfennig of Count Dietrich IV Van Limburg Broich

== Hohenlimburg and Broich inheritance ==
Dietrich IV was count of Limburg, lord of Broich and Vittinghove, guardian of Rellinghausen, Ambtman of Mülheim and settled at Broich castle. Brother Willem I chose domicile at castle Hohenlimburg. Dietrich performed his functions from Broich. At the division of inheritance on December 4, 1412, he retained free access to the Hohenlimburg ancestral castle, the county of Limburg and the right to challenge any opposing party to the free seat of Hohenlimburg. Broich castle with accompanying manor and tithes in Wülfrath were held jointly by both brothers. As well as preserving mutual rights to the Hohenlimburg. Dietrich IV died on January 16, 1444, outside Broich, during a feud with the Archbishop of Köln and Count of Gullick-Berg, who had conquered Broich after a siege.

Coat of Arms of Lordship Wisch

== Ambtman of Mülheim ==
On 21 February 1430 Dietrich IV became for Duke Adolf of Cleves of der Mark, Ambtman of Mülheim, successor of Henrick Stecke. This strengthened his dominant position around Broich. Besides the daily management of the seigniory with guarding the borders and game track, he was the recipient of the ducal income and annuities. Cared the administration of justice, the imposition of estimates, services and collection of fines. During wartime conditions, he formed an armed force with local knights to assist the duke. Alsom he concluded an agreement with the city of Duisburg to man the city walls during sieges.

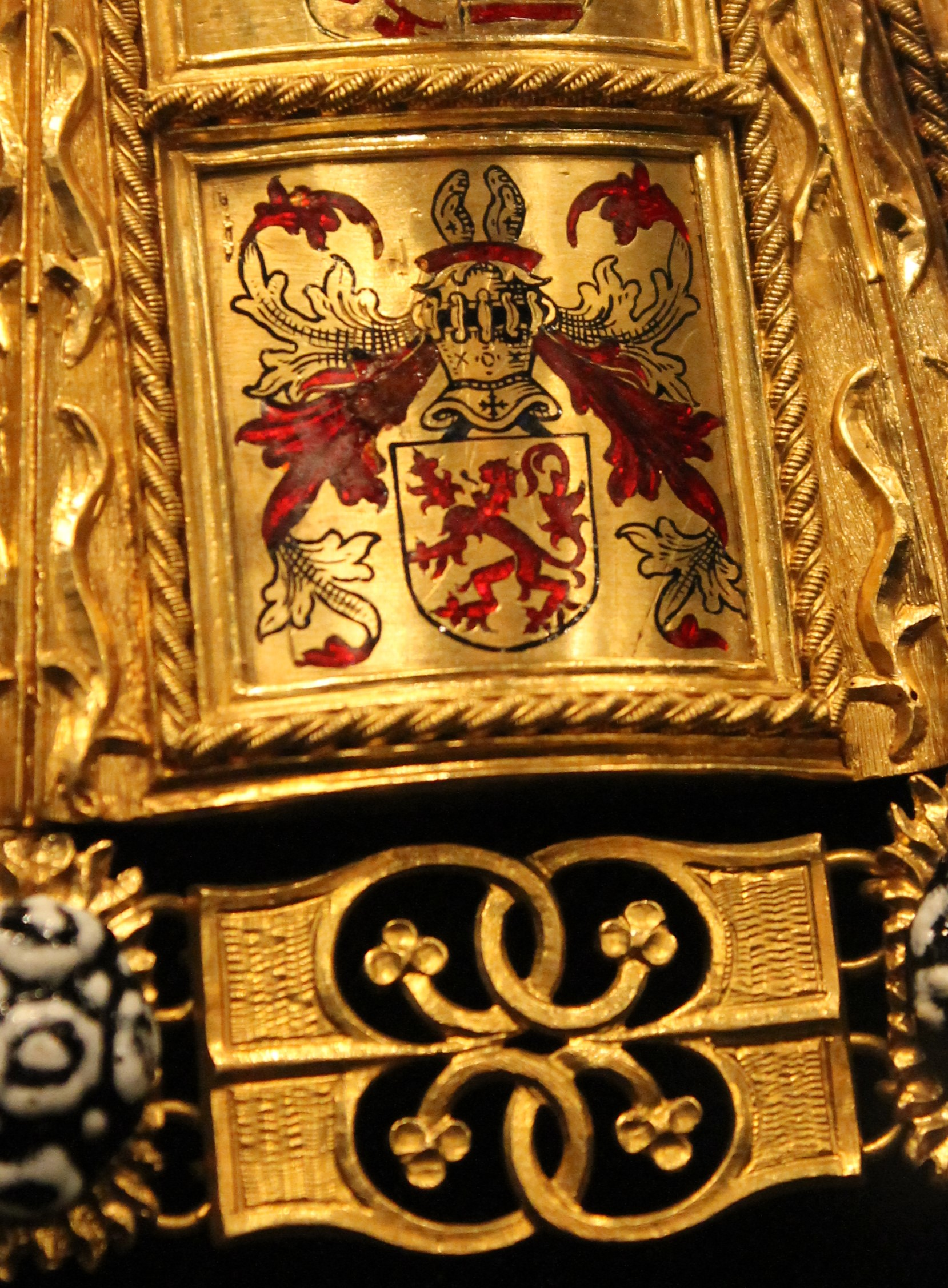
Coat of Arms Counts of Limburg Hohenlimburg-Broich

== Conflict over the succession of the Duchy of Guelders ==
In 1423 Reinald IV, Duke of Guelders and Jülich died without descendants. In Gelre, Arnold, Duke of Guelders son of Jan of Egmond was chosen as successor. Adolph I, Duke of Cleves became heir to most of the land of Jullich. An armed conflict arose about the succession in Gelre. Duke Adolf of Cleves sided with Arnold of Egmond. Opponents were the Duke of Berg with allies Gerhard of Cleves, brother of Adolf, Dietrich of Mors and the Archbishop of Cologne. Around 1430 there was an armed conflict in the border area between Cleves and Cologne, in which Count Dietrich IV of Limburg was involved. His castle Broich was located on the strategic border between the Duchy of Cleves, Duchy of Berg and the Archbishop of Cologne.

== Loan bond with Duke of Cleves ==
Count Dietrich entered into a bond with the Duke of Cleves on 1 September 1432. While Broich, south of the River Ruhr, had previously been oriented to Cologne. Brother Dietrich dedicated the allodial lordship with Broich castle, the high and low jurisdiction, lands and fishing rights on the Ruhr to Cleves to receive it back as a fief from Duke Adolf. Broich became an open fortress for the Duke of Cleves. Men in the service of Dietrich had to pay tribute and swear the oath of allegiance to the duke. His brother William I also made his share of Broich, the upper house, available to the duke.

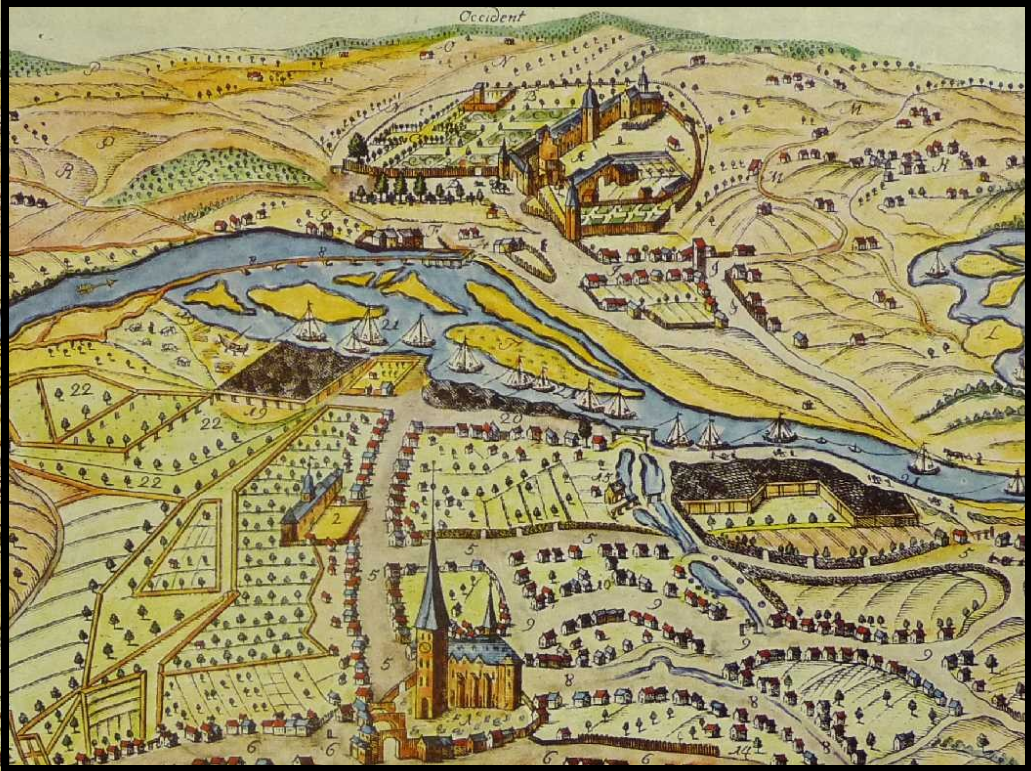
Castle of Broich, facing Mülheim and Lordship Styrum, at the border of the territory of Cleves, Berg and Koln

== Capture of Broich Castle by the Duke of Cleves ==
Dietrich IV did not strictly adhere to the agreement with Cleves. Participated in the campaign of lord of Gemen against subjects of Duke Adolf. He got into a fight with Frederik of Rechteren and imprisoned his helpers in his castle Broich. This forced the Duke of Cleves to take armed action against the Of Limburgs on Broich. In a letter dated June 4, 1439, Duke Adolf first complained to the knighthood of the Duchy of Berg, the towns of Rattingen and Düsseldorf, requesting Gerhard of Berg, the new ruler, not to intervene. Then Broich is besieged by Cleves and eventually taken. Gerhard of Cleves, brother of Adolf, Frederik of Mörs and Saarwenden, Goswin Stecke and Wesel of der Loe act as mediators. It is determined that son Dietrich V of Limburg junior instead of his father must take care of Broich and release prisoners. Renewing the loan agreement between his father and the duke and promise not to admit father Dietrich IV to Broich castle anymore. Four mediators would then transfer Broich to Dietrich junior with his brothers Willem II and Hendrik.

== Count Hendrik of Limburg enfeoffed with Broich ==
Broich was entrusted to Hendrik instead of his father and also on behalf of his brothers. Hendrik van Limburg was not in Broich during the siege. He also continued his position of Ambtman for the time being. Broich Castle on the border between Cologne and Cleves, was a location where the power struggle ensued and the Cologne Archbishop Dietrich of Mors tried to regain his ascendancy along the Rhine and Ruhr of the Clevesse house. Duke Adolf of Gullick-Berg, the other interested party in that area, was unable to oppose the Cologne ambitions due to lack of money and authority. He died without descendants and nephew Gerard of Gullick-Berg, barely 20 years old, succeeded him and sided with Cologne. His mother Adelheid of Teckelenburg was a close relative of the Archbishop. Hendrik of Limburg was again involved in the clashes between Cologne and Cleves. From Ruhrort he invaded the country of Heinzberg with his sergeants, took prisoners in Brakel and returned with them by ship via Düsseldorf through the area of Angermund to Broich Castle. The Ambtman of Angermund, Adolf Quadt, reported on this in a letter dated December 4, 1441, to Duke Gerard Of Gullick-Berg.

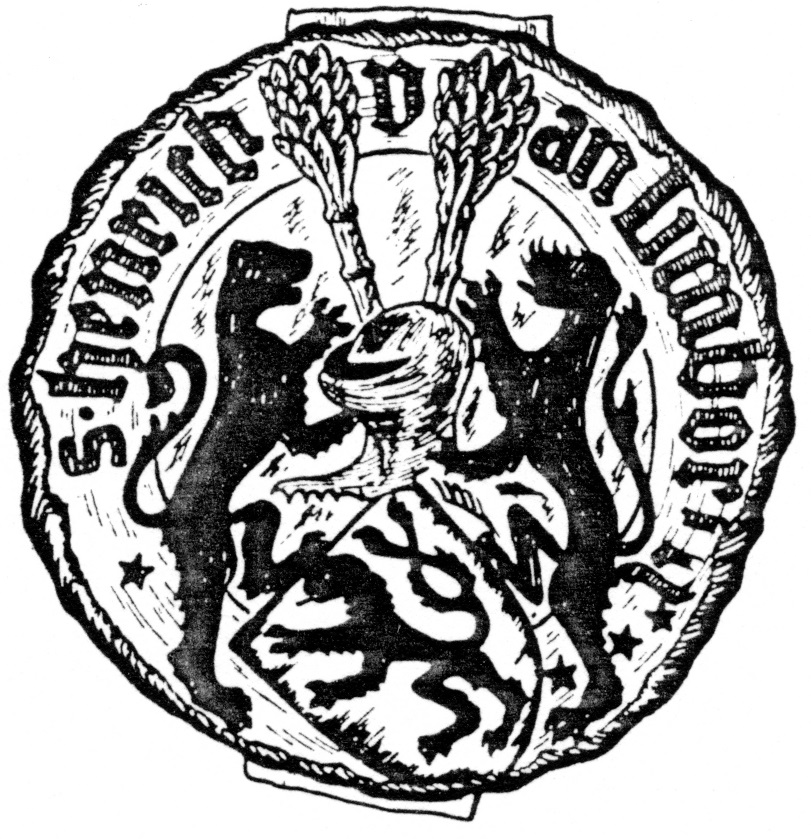
Seal of count Henry I of Limburg Hohenlimburg Broich

== Conquest of Broich castle by Cologne alliance ==
Broich, as an open fortress for Cleves, posed a strong threat to the Cologne-Gullick-Berg alliance. In a letter dated June 16, 1443, Ambtman Adolf Quad reported to Duke Gullick-Berg that he had heard that friends of Cleves had warned Hendrik of Limburg about the joint army of the Archbishop and Duke of Gullick-Berg, who were on their way to Broich. Hendrik of Limburg was still busy preparing Broich's fortifications when the army arrived at Broich. The counts of Sayn, of Blankenheim and many other lords also took part in that fighting force. The siege started on September 2, 1443, and only after 18 days on September 20, the besiegers managed to capture Broich Castle. Hendrik's brother Willem II of Limburg and Reinier of Ulenbroich, the defenders, had to capitulate. But they no longer find Count Hendrik. He had escaped captivity and that meant he hadn't had to surrender personally. Now that Broich was in the hands of the Cologne-Berg alliance, they started repairing the destroyed walls and restoring defences.

== Temporarily at Hackhausen ==
The von Limburgs had to leave Broich castle and were assigned the Schloss Hackhausen in a wooded area in the district of Ohligs on the edge of the Ohligser Heide as their domicile. An annual interest of 500 guilders as compensation. By letter, the brothers and sisters Of Limburg, Willem II, Dietrich V, Everhardt, Lukardis, Agnes and Katharina of Limburg made a statement that they were forced to part with Broich. Their brothers Everhard, canon in Cologne and Johan, provost of Werden, are not mentioned in that letter, although they were involved in the conflict in the background. Dietrich IV their father died a year later on January 16, 1444.

== Johan of Limburg, Probst Abbey of Werden ==
Everhard of Limburg, had come straight from Cologne to brother Johan in the St. Ludger Abbey of Werden during the conflict in 1443. He died there seven years later in 1450. Two years after the death of their father count Diederick IV. The archbishop of Cologne, Dietrich of Mörs, also transferred his share of Broich with the Kerspel Mühlheim to eldest son Willem II of Limburg on 11 April 1446. Johan of Limburg was since May 22, 1436, Probst first in Zelle, then the monastery of Werden on the river Ruhr. After the Abbot the most important and influential position. Was manager of the large land holdings with estates as far as the Veluwe. From mother's side a born Of Wisch from Gelre. At the age of fifty years around 1468 Johan left the monastery and concluded a secret marriage with Anna Borckhartz of de Schenkenbusch for mayors, aldermen of Essen and judge Ruthger of Galen, known as Halswick. From that union a premarital son Dietrich and after the marriage son Adolf of Limburg was born. Adolf is at the basis of the last legitimate family branch that is still thriving in the Netherlands.

== William II Count of Limburg Hohenlimburg-Broich ==
Eldest son Count Willem II of Limburg became lord of Broich castle with the seigniory and also became an Amtman. In 1446 Duke Gerhard of Gullick-Berg gave him his share back from Broich in exchange for the return of the House of Hackhausen. In condominium with Von Neuenahr he was already co-owner of the Hohenlimburg castle. Provisions agreed upon by his father Dietrich IV in 1430 came into force again. On April 11, 1446, the Archbishop concluded a security and civil peace alliance with Cleves. Count Willem II married Jutta of Runkel in 1463. They had a son Johan. He would go down in history as the last count of Limburg Hohenlimburg-Broich. Johan married Elisabeth of Neuenahr. His aunt, Maria married Sebastian Count of Sayn and Irmgrad with the lord of Loe at Wisen.

== Marriage and offspring ==
Dietrich IV count of Limburg Ambtman Mülheim c. 1375-16 January 1444, married on 3 February 1415 Henrica of Wisch, who died in 1459. Eight children were born:

- Wilhelm II count of Limburg Broich 1416-14 September 1473 married in 1463 Jutta of Runkel
- Heinrich count of Limburg Broich 1417-1486 married in 1450 Irmgard of Boimelburg died 6 June 1483 (Köln)
- Agnes of Limburg 1418-1493 married 4 March 1448 Wilhelm lord of Limburg-Styrum died 1498
- Dietrich V count of Limburg Broich 1419-22 March 1478 unmarried, became Amtmann Iserlohn on 13.04.1461
- Eberhard of Limburg 1420-1453 Canon of St. Gereon Köln 1450 Cellar of Abbey Werden
- Johann of Limburg, 1421-1472 Probst zu Werden. Resign from the Abbey. Married approx. 1468 Anna Borckhartz zu Schenkenbush
- Lukard of Limburg 1422-1444 Power Stecke, count of Dortmund died 1465
- Katharina of Limburg, 1424-1472 Tresauerer Stift zu Vreden

== Literature ==
- Binding, G. (1970) Schloss Broich in Mülheim/Ruhr. (Kunst und Altertum am Rhein. No. 23, ISSN 0075-725X) Rheinland-Verlag, Düsseldorf 1970.
- Ortmanns, K. (1985) Schloss Broich in Mülheim an der Ruhr. Rheinische Kunststatten, Heft 77. Cologne 1985.
- Mostert, R.A. (2008) Broich: Burg, Schloss, Residenz. In: Zeugen der Stadtgeschichte / Baudenkmäler und historic Orte in Mülheim an der Ruhr. Report Klartext, Essen 2008.
- Korteweg, K.N. (1964) [Dutch] De Nederlandse Leeuw Volume LXXXI no.8 August 1964.
- Limburg of, H. (2016) [Dutch]. Counts of Limburg Hohenlimburg & Broich. ISBN 978-94-92185-59-4 [HVL R01 RG:date] Regests 01 & 02. ISBN 978-94-92185-60-0
- Berg, A. lineage counts of Limburg Hohenlimburg and Lords of Limburg-Styrum. Archive for Sippenforschung Heft 14. Jahrgang 30. Mai 1964
- Bleicher, W. / Limburg of, H. 1998-2004 [German/Dutch] Neue Aspekte der Geschichte der Grafen von Hohen-Limburg und ihrer Nachkommen. In: Hohenlimburger Heimatblätter, Teil 1: 59, 3/1998, S. 81–93; Part 2: 59, 6/1998, S. 201–213; Part 3: 59, 8/1998, S. 281–294, 307–311; Part 4: 63, 10/2002, S. 364–375, 386–390; Part 5: 64, 2003, S. 210–214, 226-230 & Hefte (2004) Page 70–79.
- Veen, J.S. Works Gelre no. 14 The Last Government Years of Duke Arnold of Gelre 1456-1465. Press S. Goeda Quint Arnhem 1920
- Nijhof, I.A. Memorials from the history of Gelderland 6 parts I to VI Arnhem 1830 1875.
- Kastner, D.: Die Territorialpolitik der Grafen von Kleve, Düsseldorf 1972, Veröffentlichungen des Historischen Vereins fur den Niederrhein
- Jansen, W. Kleve/Mark/Jüllich/Berg/Ravensberg. Land im Mittelpunkt der Mächte. Herzogtumer 3. 1985.
- Städtisches Museum Haus Koekkoek; Stadtmuseum Düsseldorf (1985). Land im Mittelpunkt der Mächte: Die Herzogtümer Jülich, Kleve, Berg. Boss-Verlag. ISBN 3-922384-46-3.
- Limburg of, H. Hohenlimburger Heimatblatter Heft 10/2024 Leserbriefe: Auf Limburger Spuren im Schloss Broich Blatt 356-360.

== Sources ==
- [ARCH.KLN. PUTTEN] SLICHER OF BATH, B.H. The archive of the Kelnarij of Putten. State Archives in Gelderland. 1952. R. Wartena. Supplement 1968. Press Ministry of OK and W. The Hague
- [BLEICHER] Bleicher, W. [German] Monatsschrift des Vereins für Orts- und Heimatkunde Hohenlimburg e.V. History of the Grafschaft Limburg. Hohenlimburger Heimatblätter.
- [LDS.RHEINLAND Nr.] Landschaftsverband Rheinland. Inv.nie st. archive. No.21. Cologne 1977 Rheinland verlag /Beiderdruck Bergisch Gladbach ISBN 3-7927-0309-2
- [HVL R01:RG:] van Limburg, H. 2016. Counts of Limburg Hohenlimburg & Broich. Regesten Part 01. Printing house: Pro-Book Utrecht. 2016-2022. ISBN 978-94-92185-60-0 2010 charters, transcriptions and documents period 1180-1800. Addenda
- [SCHUBERT Nr.] Schubert H. Urkunden und Erlauterungen zur Geschichte der Stadt Mülheim an der Ruhr.
- [STA MULHEIM] Original in Stadtarchiv Mülheim File Herrschaft Broich. Urkunden File No. 1010
- [KREMER Bd II] Kremer, J.C. (1770) Akademische Beitragen zur Gülich und Bergischen Geschichte. Band II
