= Willem II and Hendrik I counts of Limburg Hohenlimburg Broich =

Dutch nobleman brothers

The brothers counts Willem II and Hendrik I, sons of Diederick IV count of Limburg Hohenlimburg Broich and Lukardis of Broich succeed each other as Count of Limburg Hohenlimburg Broich. In 1446, two years after the death of their father Diederick. The Archbishop of Cologne, after the conquest of Broich castle handed over his share of Broich to Willem II of Limburg. The Duke of Gullick-Berg also returned his share of Broich. Willem had to reconfirm provisions that his father Diederik IV had agreed upon in 1430. Brother Hendrik of Limburg continued to fight for the Cleves party. It was not until April 7, 1454, that he agreed to waiver of his Lordship rights to Broich.

Coat of Arms the counts of Limburg Hohenlimburg and Broich

== Battle of Varlar during the Münsterse Stiftsfehde ==
On July 18, 1454, a battle took place near Varlar. Diederik of Mörs, Archbishop of Cologne, assisted by, Konrad Diepenholt, Bishop of Osnabrück, Duke Arnold of Gelre, Count Bernard of Bentheim, Lord Arnold of Steinfurt, Count Willem II of Limburg Lord of Broich, Hendrik of Gemen, Gijsbert of Batenburg, Marshal Gerhard Morrien, Gerhard Keppel, Diederik of der Horst and several others won the victory over Duke Frederik of Brunswijk-Luneburg party member of Johan of Hoya. This conflict is known as the Münsterse Stiftsfehde. The Archbishop of Cologne became financially obliged to Willem through his military efforts. On February 22, 1459, he had to lease him the village of Mülheim for 4078 guilders. Mülheim became part of the lordship Broich Gradually, Broich's feudal relations with Cologne and Berg diminished. The rule of the counts of Limburg and their independence steadily increased again. Meanwhile, in the county of Limburg aan de Lenne, uncle Count Willem I of Limburg, lord of Bedburg, was on 28 February 1459 died without male successors.

== Unfortunately failed marriage contract ==
The tribal castle, Hohenlimburg came to her husband Gumprecht of Neuenahr due to unfortunate provisions in the marriage contract of William II's niece, Margaretha. In 1442 a provision was included in the declaration of succession that the county and lordship of Limburg, with helmet, shield, coat of arms and title, with castles, land and people, fiefs, free counties and free seats, wildban, coin and other rights and powers to Margaret and with that, her husband Gumprecht of Neuenahr would fall. To be extra assured of this, Gumprecht had secretly received a certificate from Frederick III, Holy Roman Emperor on 14 May 1442 in Nuremberg that the County of Limburg, von den Kaisern und Koningen und vom Reich zu Lehnen due to lack of heirs would fall to Gumprecht of Neuenahr in due course.

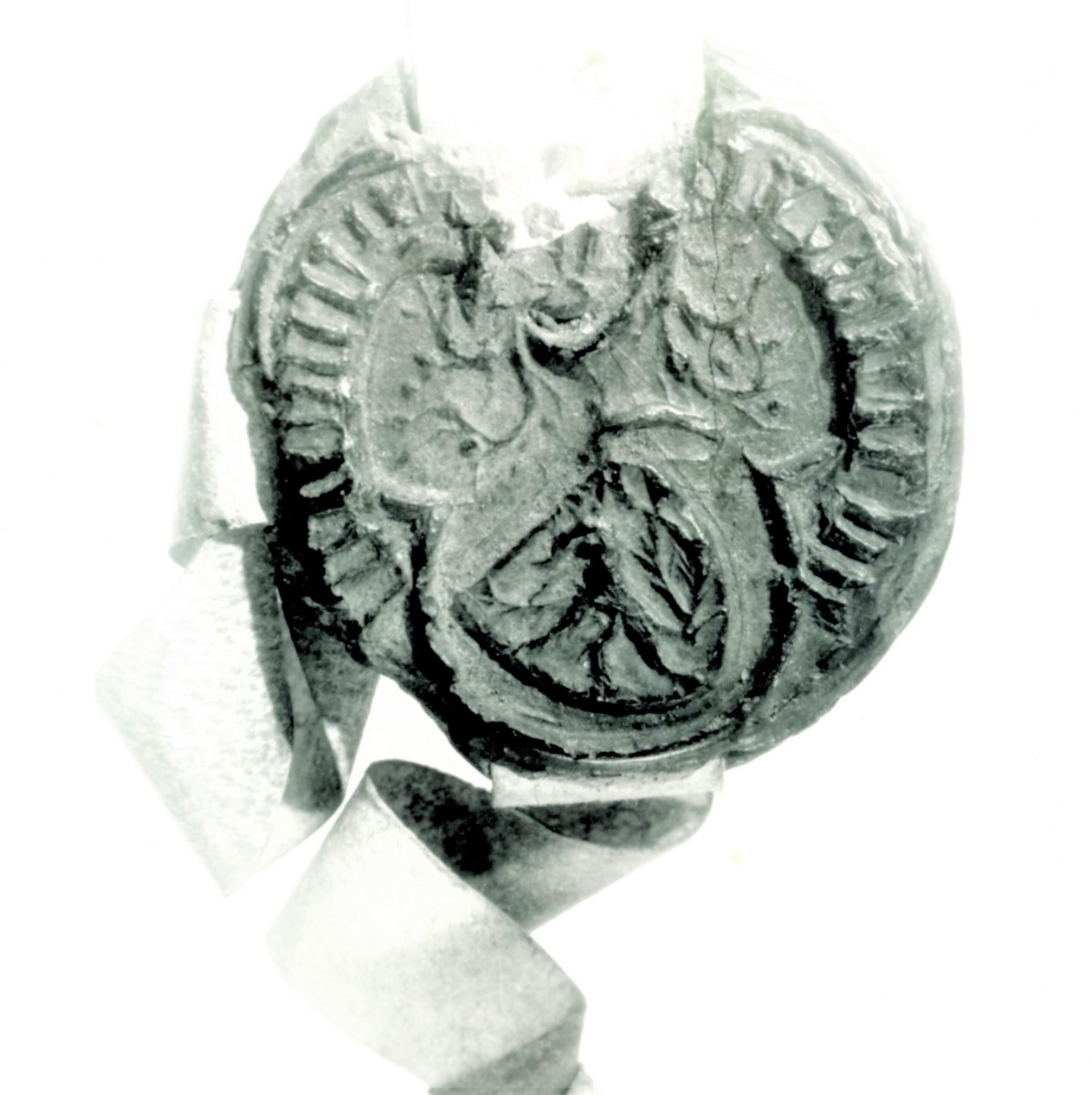
Seal 1453 Count Hendrick I

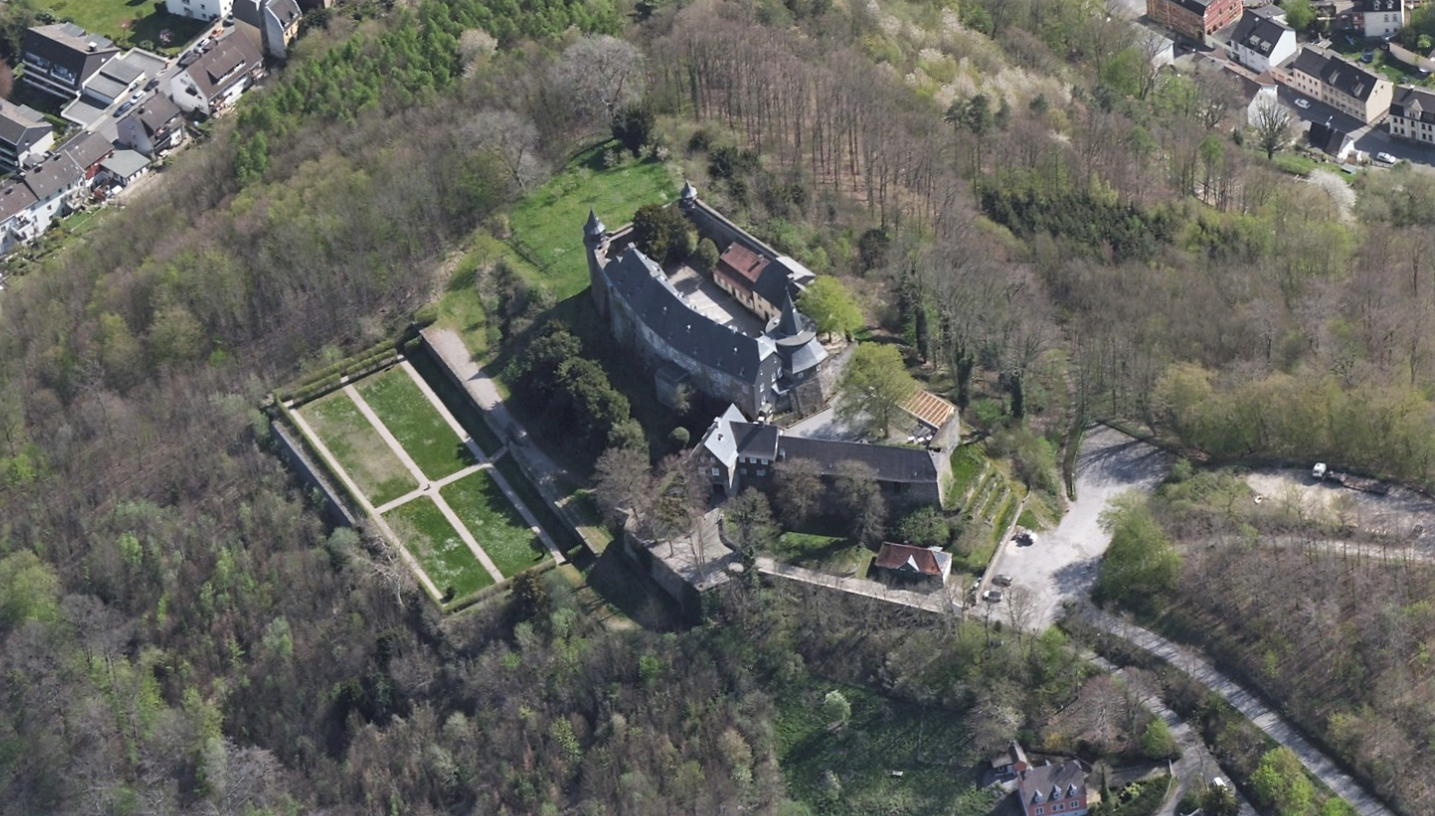
Schloss Hohenlimburg on the river Lenne

== Hendrik Count of Limburg Broich ==
Hendrik of Limburg, had continued to fight for the Cleves party in the 1450s. It was not until April 7, 1454, that he agreed to a waiver of rights to Broich. However, should Broich later become his heir, he would first have to swear allegiance and obedience to the Cologne archbishop. Hendrik of Limburg Broich was married in 1450 to Irmgrad of Boimelburg. That marriage was childless. For years Hendrik was at the head, after brothers Johan before March 14, 1472, Willem II on August 14, 1473, and Diederik V on March 22, 1478, had died. Brother Everhard Cellar in Werden died already in 1453 and brother Johan Probst in Werden had left the monastery and came to live after his marriage around 1465, with Hendrik at castle Broich.Until the year of both their father’s dead 1472/73 the tree young cousins Diederik and Johan about. 8 years old and Adolf 6 years of age frequently were playing together at Broich and had their first education and training riding on horseback.

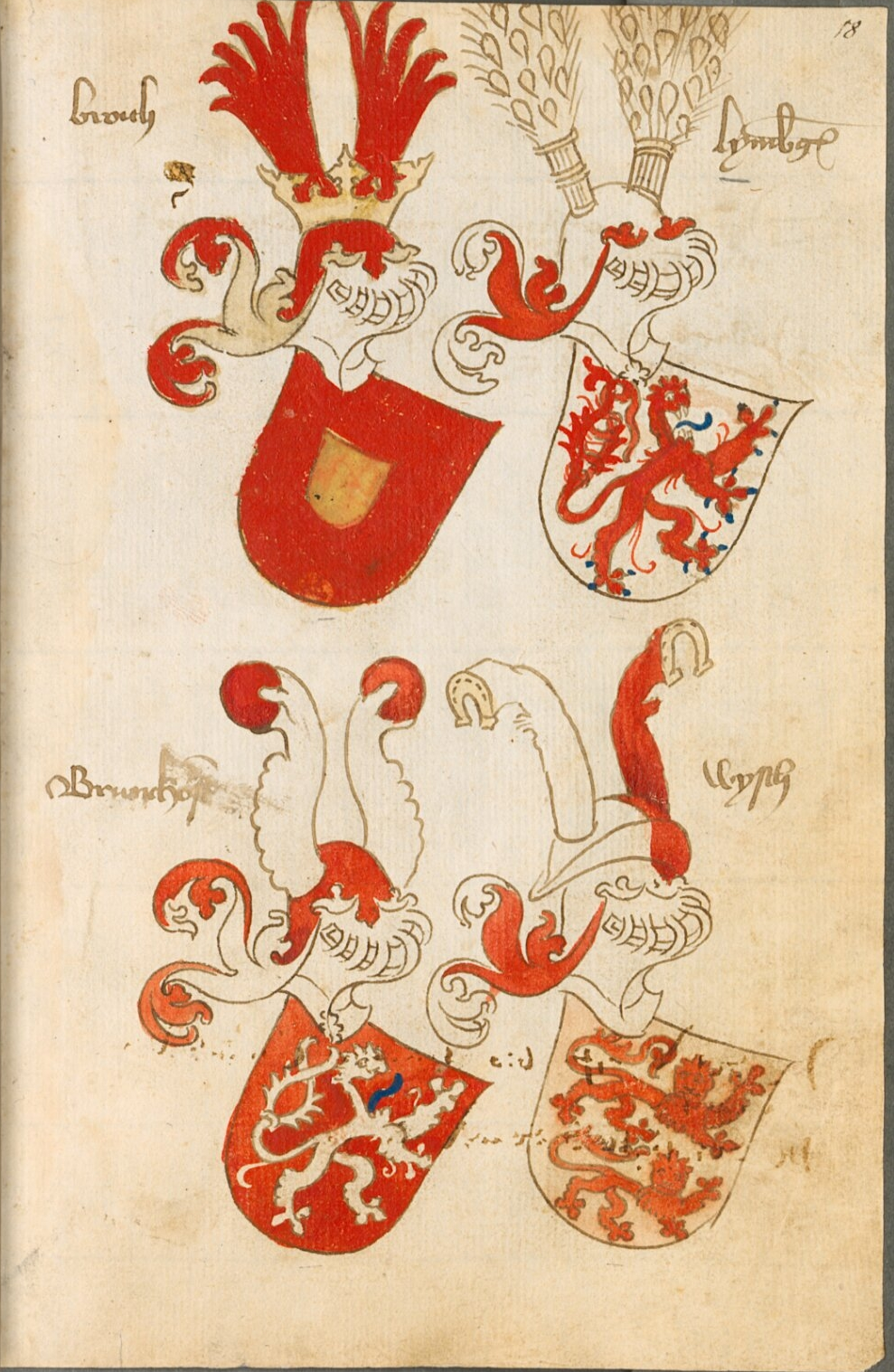
Quarterly Arms Count Hendrik van Limburg Hohenlimburg Broich Anno 1477

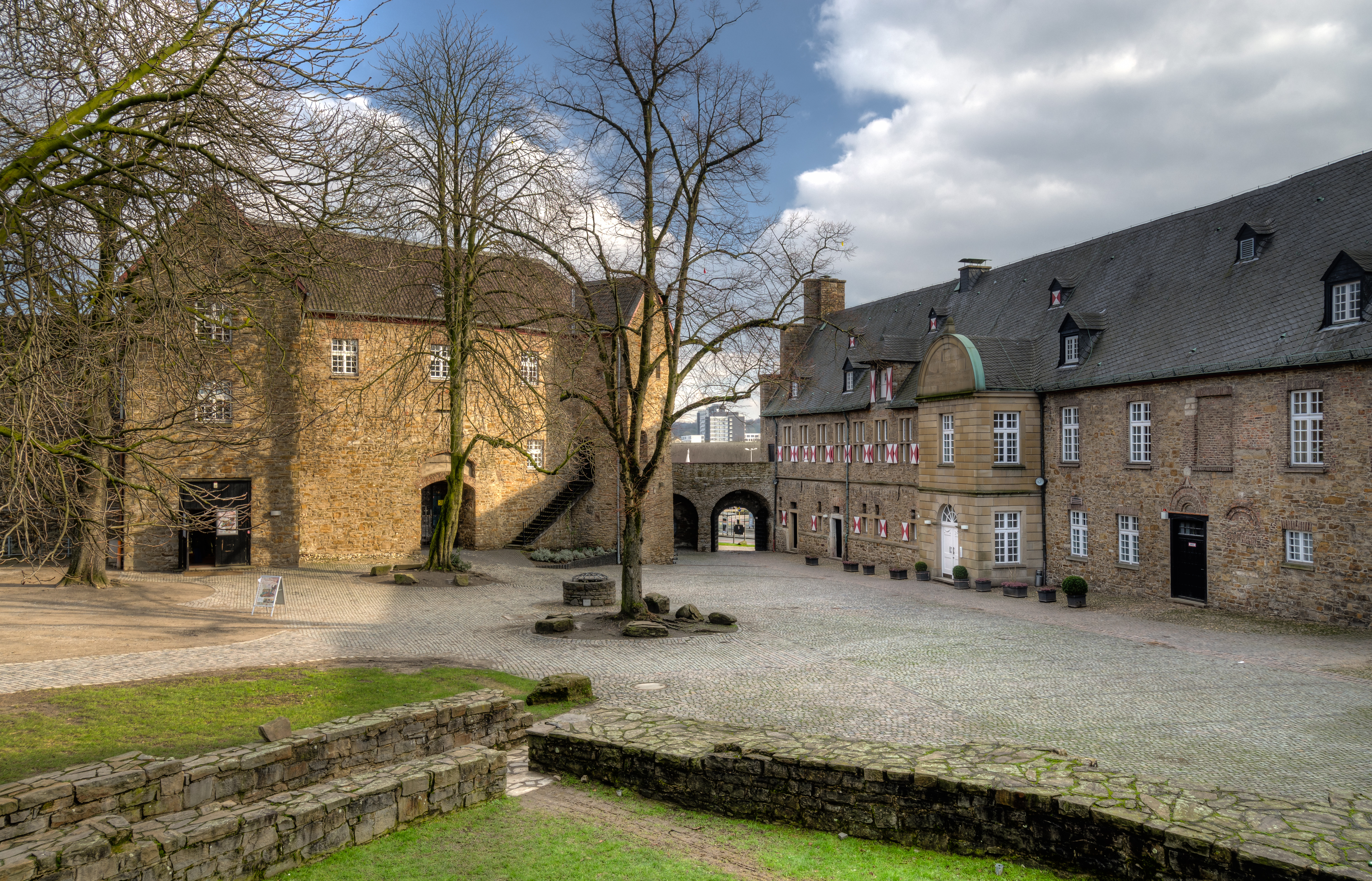
Castle Broich on the river Ruhr

== Conquest of Hohenlimburg from Of Neuenahr ==
After uncle Count Willem I died in Hohenlimburg in February 1459, husband Gumprecht of Neuenahr took possession of the county and the castle of Limburg from his only daughter Margaretha. Cousins Willem II, Diederik V and Hendrik of Limburg-Broich, sons of the late brother Diederik IV of Limburg-Broich, supported by the other two brothers and sisters, were not satisfied with this. Duke Gerhard of Gullick-Berg in Nideggen confirmed on 25 June 1459. the loan of Hohenlimburg, castle, fortresses and liberties. In doing so, they outsmarted Gumprecht of Neuenahr. His father-in-law Count Willem I had not informed him that his liege was the Count Of Berg and not the king. The legal impasse was presented to the German Roman King Frederick. It soon became apparent that the king was not authorized to pawn the county to the of Neuenahrs. The county of Limburg was not a state, "vom Reich zu Lehnen" but a fief of the former dukes of Limburg, with the duke of Berg as legal successor.

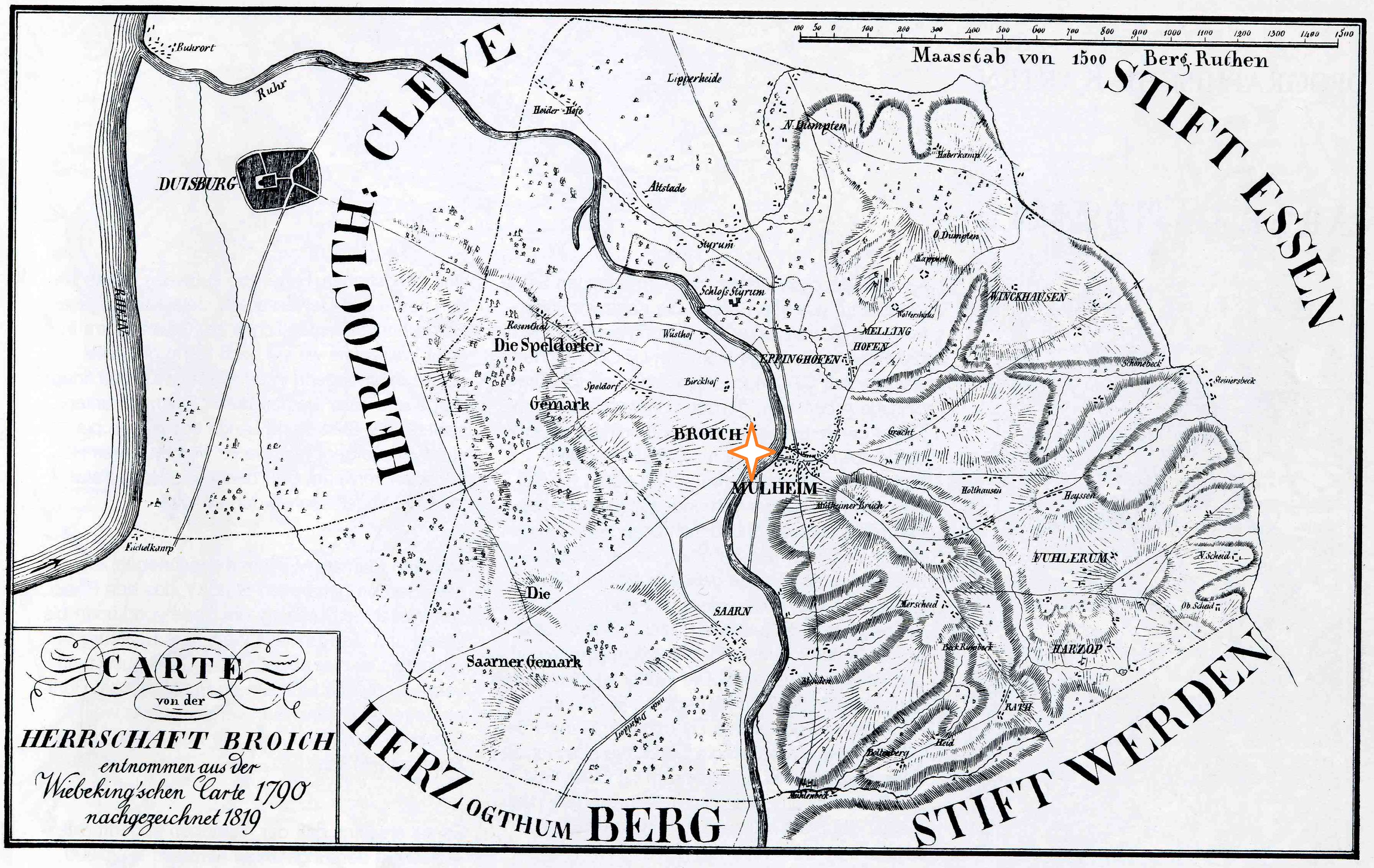
Castle Broich at the Border of Dutches Cleve and Berg

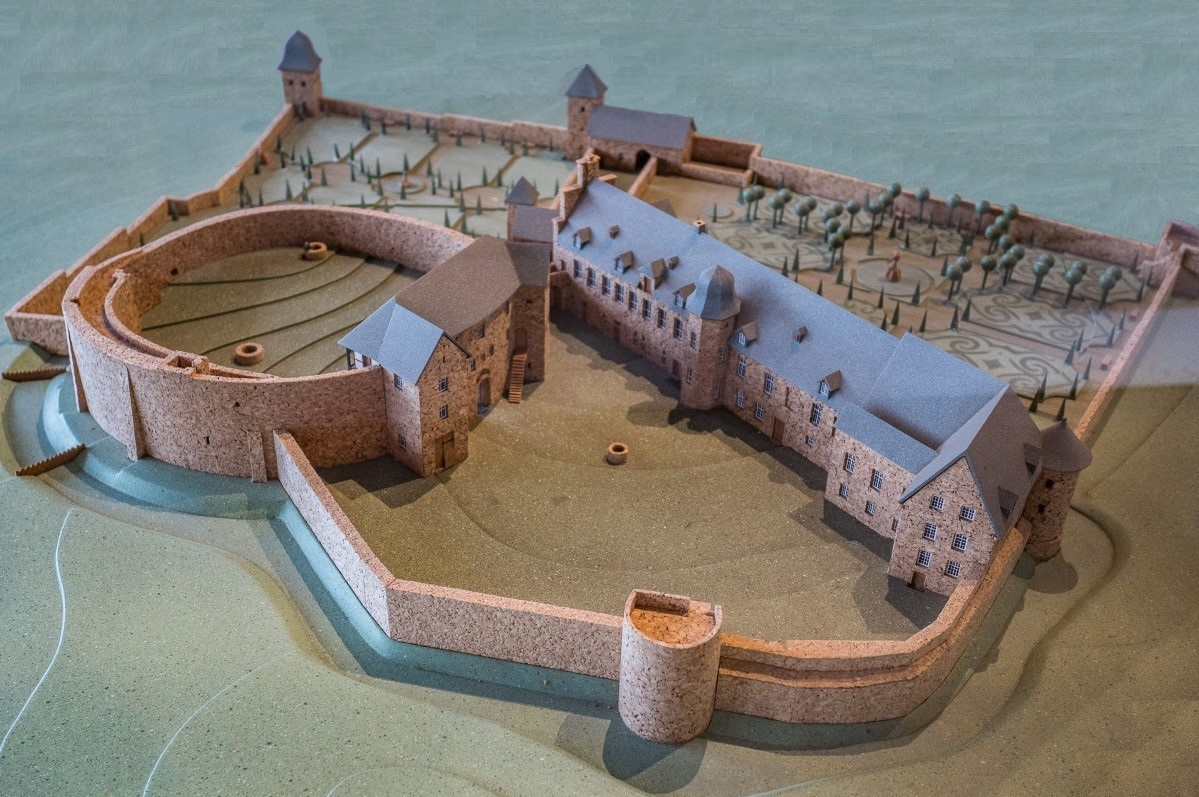
Model of Castle Broich

== The Hohenlimburg condominium ==
With the help of friends Everhard of de Mark zu Arburg and Johan and Bertram of Nesselrode, the Of Limburg brothers went from Broich on October 2, 1459, to the Hohenlimburg in no time. Took possession of their ancestral castle. On March 22, 1460, Diederik Archbishop of Cologne mediates together with Count Vincentius of Mors-Saarwenden. It was determined that the Of Limburg's and Of Neuenahr each own half of the Slot Limburg with associated rights and goods. No fewer than seven guarantors guarantee compliance with the agreement for each party. For the Of Limburg's these are the count Gerhard of Sayn, lord Hendrik of Gemen, lord Hendrik of Wisch, Gijsbert of Bronkhorst lord of Batenburg, Willem I of Limburg lord of Styrum, Willem of Nesselrode lord of Steyn as well as the knights Lambert of Bevessen, Johan Bertram of Nessselrode, Werner of Bevessen and Rheinhard Hugenpoeth. Of Neuenahr has as sureties the count Jacob of Hoorne, Viscount Diederik of Ryneck, Lutter Quadt lord of Thomberg, Adolf Quadt, Arnt of Hoemen viscount of Oedenkichen, Hendrik lord of Drachenfeltz, knights Hendrik of Kendenich, Emond Beysell, Ulrich of Holtorp, Hendrik of Ruyschenberg and Johan of Lulstorp.

== Succession by Count Hendrik of Limburg ==
Count Willem II of Limburg-Broich, fell in 1473 in the siege of Tönisberg west of the Rhine near Hüls and Kempen and was buried in the Minorite monastery in Duisburg. His brother Hendrick is enfeoffed in 1478 by the duke Willem III of Gullick - Berg with the Hohenlimburg and with Broich. Against payment of 1500 guilders he also transfers his courts at Biege, drostambt Angermund and the court at Beeckhuisen near Schwerte to this Bergse fief. Is guardian for the children of brother Willem and two cousins Diederik and Adolf of his now deceased brother Johan II. In 1484 Hendrik draws up a will stipulating that his nephew Johan III will succeed him as Count of Limburg Hohenlimburg and Broich. His two cousins "unser magen" Diederik and Adolf, sons of brother Johan II, (former probst of Werden, who resigned and married to Anna Borchartz of the Schenkenbush) were appointed as "Holzgraf" and "Wiltforster" of the Spellendorferwald. A vast forest area between Broich Castle, Duisburg and Düsseldorf.

== Marriage and offspring ==
Willem II count of Limburg Hohenlimburg-Broich 1446-1472 was married to Married Metza of Reifferscheid, erbin of Bedburg and had a son Johan and two daughters.

- Johan III count of Limburg Broich d. 26 June 1511 married Elisabeth of Neuenahr
- Maria of Limburg married Sebastian count of Sayn
- Irmgard of Limburg married lord of Loe zu Wissen

Hendrik I count of Limburg Hohenlimburg-Boich 1472-1486 married Irmgard of Bommelberg, who died on June 6, 1482, Hendrik died four years later, on July 23, 1486, without descendants.

- His cousin Johan III of Limburg Hohenlimburg-Broich succeeded as count. He died on 26 July 1511 and was buried in the Petrikerk in Mülheim. Before his death he took his niece Irmgard Countess of Sayn as an adoptive daughter upon her marriage to Wirich of Daun and bestowed upon her all inheritance rights. Wyrick V of Daun, lord of Falkenstein and Oberstein, receives Limburg Hohenlimburg-Broich in 1508 by Duke Willem of Gullick-Berg on loan.

Diederick V count of Limburg ± 1419-1478. Amtman of Iserlohn, not married.

Everhard (born count of Limburg) ± 1420-1453 Cellar of the Abbey of Werden, not married.

Johan II (born count of Limburg) ± 1421-1472 former Probst of Werden, resign and married ±1465 to Anna Borchartz of Schenkenbush

- Dietrich of Limburg born ± 1464 - 1516 Wildgraf Saarn, married Elseken
- Adolf I of Limburg born ± 1467 - 1537 Wiltforster Saarn, Judge zu Essen, married Margaretha. Offspring Mayors and Aldermen of Essen, Dorsten, Duisburg, Land agents of county Lingen

== Literature ==
- Ortmanns, K.(1985) Schloss Broich in Mülheim an der Ruhr. Rheinische Kunststatten, Heft 77. Cologne 1985.
- Mostert, R.A.(2008) Broich: Burg, Schloss, Residenz. In: Zeugen der Stadtgeschichte / Baudenkmäler und historic Orte in Mülheim an der Ruhr. Report Klartext, Essen 2008.
- Korteweg, K.N.(1964)[Dutch] De Nederlandse Leeuw Volume LXXXI no.8 August 1964.
- Limburg Van, H.(2016) [Dutch]. Counts of Limburg Hohenlimburg & Broich. (ISBN 978-94-92185-59-4)
- Bleicher, W. / Limburg Van H., 1998-2004 [German / Dutch] Neue Aspekte der Geschichte der Grafen von Hohen-Limburg und ihrer Nachkommen. In: Hohenlimburger Heimatblätter Teil 1: 59, 3/1998, S. 81–93; Part 2: 59, 6/1998, S. 201–213; Part 3: 59, 8/1998, S. 281–294, 307–311; Part 4: 63, 10/2002, S. 364–375, 386–390; Part 5: 64, 2003, S. 210–214, 226-230 & Hefte (2004) Page 70–79.
- Veen, J.S. Works Gelre no. 14 The Last Government Years of Duke Arnold of Gelre 1456–1465. Press S. Goeda Quint Arnhem 1920
- Kastner, D.: Die Territorialpolitik der Grafen von Kleve, Düsseldorf 1972, Veröffentlichungen des Historischen Vereins fur den Niederrhein.
- Janssen, W. Kleve/Mark/Jüllich/Berg/Ravensberg. Land im Mittelpunkt der Mächte. Herzogtumer 3. 1985.
- Städtisches Museum Haus Koekkoek; Stadtmuseum Düsseldorf (1985). Land im Mittelpunkt der Mächte: Die Herzogtümer Jülich, Kleve, Berg. Kleve: Boss-Verlag. ISBN 3-922384-46-3.
- Limburg of, H. Hohenlimburger Heimatblatter Heft 10/2024 Leserbriefe: Auf Limburger Spuren im Schloss Broich Blatt 356-360.

== Sources ==
- [GERMANIA SACRA] MAX PLANCK INSTITUT Die Bistümmer Der Kirchprovinz Köln. Report: Walter De Gruyter-Berlin-New York.Neu Folge 17.1 Wilhelm Kohl 1987. Das Bistum Münster 4.1 ISBN 3-11-011030-X Das Domstrift St. Paulus zu Münster.
- [HANSEN, J 1890]: Die Munstersche Stiftfehde. Westfahlen-uns Rheinland im 15 Jahrhundert 2. Publ. Preusz StA 42. 1890.
- [BLEICHER Verein.Hohenlimburg] Bleicher, [German] Monatsschrift des Vereins für Orts- und Heimatkunde Hohenlimburg e.V. History of the Grafschaft Limburg. Hohenlimburger Heimatblätter.
- [ARCH RHEDA] Furstl. Bentheim-Tecklenburgsches Archiv zu Rheda.
- [HVL R01:RG:] Limburg van, H. 2016. Counts of Limburg Hohenlimburg & Broich. Regesten DL01. 2010 charter and deed transcriptions, period 1180–1800. Two volumes. (ISBN 978-94-92185-60-0).
- [SCHUBERT Nr.] Schubert H. Urkunden und Erlauterungen zur Geschichte der Stadt Mülheim an der Ruhr.
- [STA MULHEIM] Original in Stadtarchiv Mülheim File Herrschaft Broich. Urkunden File No. 1010
- [VON STEINEN] Von Steinen, J.D. Westfälische Geschichte 1760. Bdn 1–4. Lemgo 1755-60
- [STA MUNSTER] Westfälischer Urkundenbuch. Staats Archiv Münster 1919. Urkunden Repertory Findbücher
- [KREMER Bd II] Kremer, J.C. (1770) Akademische Beitragen zur Gülich und Bergischen Geschichte. Band II
