= William of Limburg-Broich =

William of Limburg-Broich (c. 1416 – 1473) was the Count of Limburg-Broich from 1446 until 1473.

William was a brother of Count Henry of Limburg-Broich. When Henry died in 1446 William succeeded him. William became embroiled in a dispute with the Counts of Neuenahr-Alpen over the County of Limburg in 1449, following the death of Count William of Limburg-Styrum. After open warfare broke out, both William and the Count of Neuenahr-Alpen were subjected to the arbitration of the Archbishop of Cologne. He ruled to partition the County in half, and in 1479 it was ruled in condominium. William died on 14 September 1473 and was succeeded by his son John.

Preceded by:	John	Succeeded by:
Henry	Count of Limburg-Broich; 1446 - 1473	John
