= John of Limburg-Broich =

John of Limburg-Broich (c. 1464 - 1511) was the Count of Limburg-Broich from 1473 until 1508.

John was a son of Count William of Limburg-Broich. In 1473 he succeeded his father and was confirmed by the Duke of Berg in August 1484. In 1505 he married his adopted daughter Amoena of Sayn to Count Wirich V of Daun-Falkenstein. John abdicated in 1508 and was succeeded by the couple. He died on 26 July 1511.

Preceded by:	John	Succeeded by:
William	Count of Limburg-Broich; 1473 - 1508	Amoena & Wirich V of Daun-Falkenstein
