= Henry of Limburg-Broich =

Count of Limburg-Broich

Henry of Limburg-Broich (? - 1446) was the Count of Limburg-Broich from 1439 - 1446.

Henry was a son of Count Theodoric IV of Limburg-Styrum. When Count William I of Limburg-Styrum died in 1439, the County was partitioned with Henry receiving the Lordship of Broich. Henry died in 1449 and was succeeded by William.

Preceded by:	Henry	Succeeded by:
William I of Limburg-Styrum	Count of Limburg-Broich; 1439 - 1446	William
