= Obermünster, Regensburg =

Religious community

Imperial Abbey of Obermünster Reichsstift Obermünster (German)
- 1315–1803
- Coat of arms of the Imperial Abbey (modern drawing)

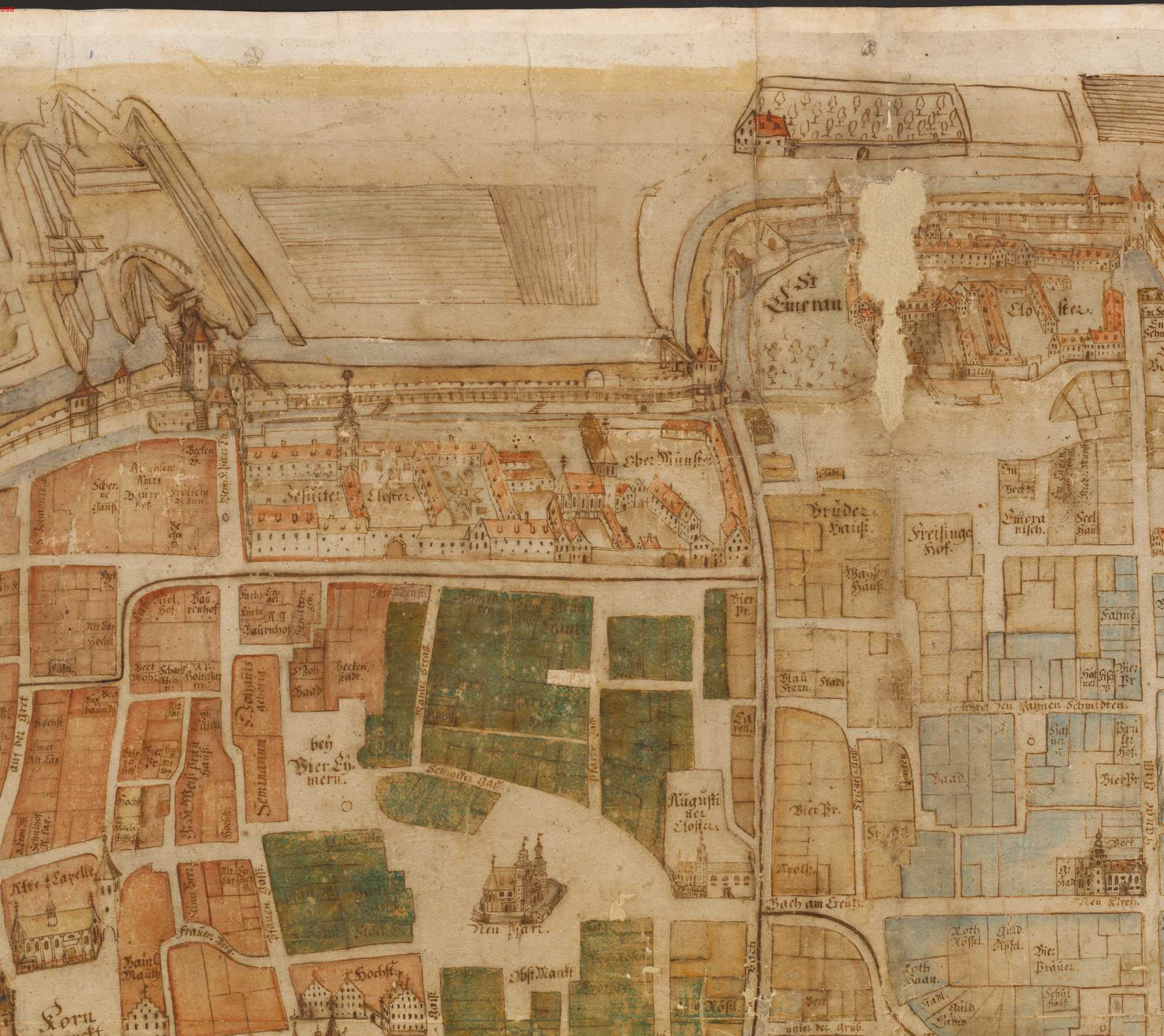
- Location of the monastery in the city of Regensburg on a city map section from 1700 (Obermünster in the upper center of the picture, right monastery area)

- (Map of the Bavarian Imperial Circle after 1696; Regensburg on the Danube in the upper center of the map in the largest pink field)
- Status: Imperial Abbey of the Holy Roman Empire
- Capital: Obermünster
- Government: Principality
- Historical era: Middle Ages
  - Founded: Early 9th century
  - Destroyed by fire: 1002 1315
  - Refounded, with Reichsfreiheit: Before 1024
  - Gained Papal protection: 1219
  - Raised to Imperial principality: 1315
  - Secularised to Regensburg: 1803
Preceded by	Succeeded by
Prince-Bishopric of Regensburg	Kingdom of Bavaria

The Obermünster, or Obermünster Abbey, Regensburg, was a collegiate house of canonesses (Frauenstift) in Regensburg, Bavaria, second only to Niedermünster in wealth and power.

== History ==
The Obermünster ("higher monastery", named in relation to the older Niedermünster, or "lower monastery"), dedicated to the Assumption of the Virgin Mary, was founded in the early 9th century by the ruling house of the Carolingians as a Benedictine nunnery to complement the adjacent St. Emmeram's Abbey. It passed almost immediately into the possession of the bishops of Regensburg, at that date also abbots of St. Emmeram's, but King Louis the German recovered it by exchanging Mondsee Abbey for it in 833. His widow, Hemma, became abbess of Obermünster, although she was buried in St. Emmeram's. In the early 10th century it was a private monastery of the family of the Dukes of Bavaria. The nunnery and its church were destroyed by fire in 1002, and was rebuilt and revitalised by Emperor Henry II, who is traditionally considered its founder, and who made it an Imperial abbey — judicially independent, but in this case without territorial sovereignty.

In 1219 it was put under Papal protection and in 1315 Emperor Louis the Bavarian elevated the abbesses to the Reichsfürstentum, or Imperial principality, after which they were known as Princess-abbesses ("Fürstäbtissinnen").

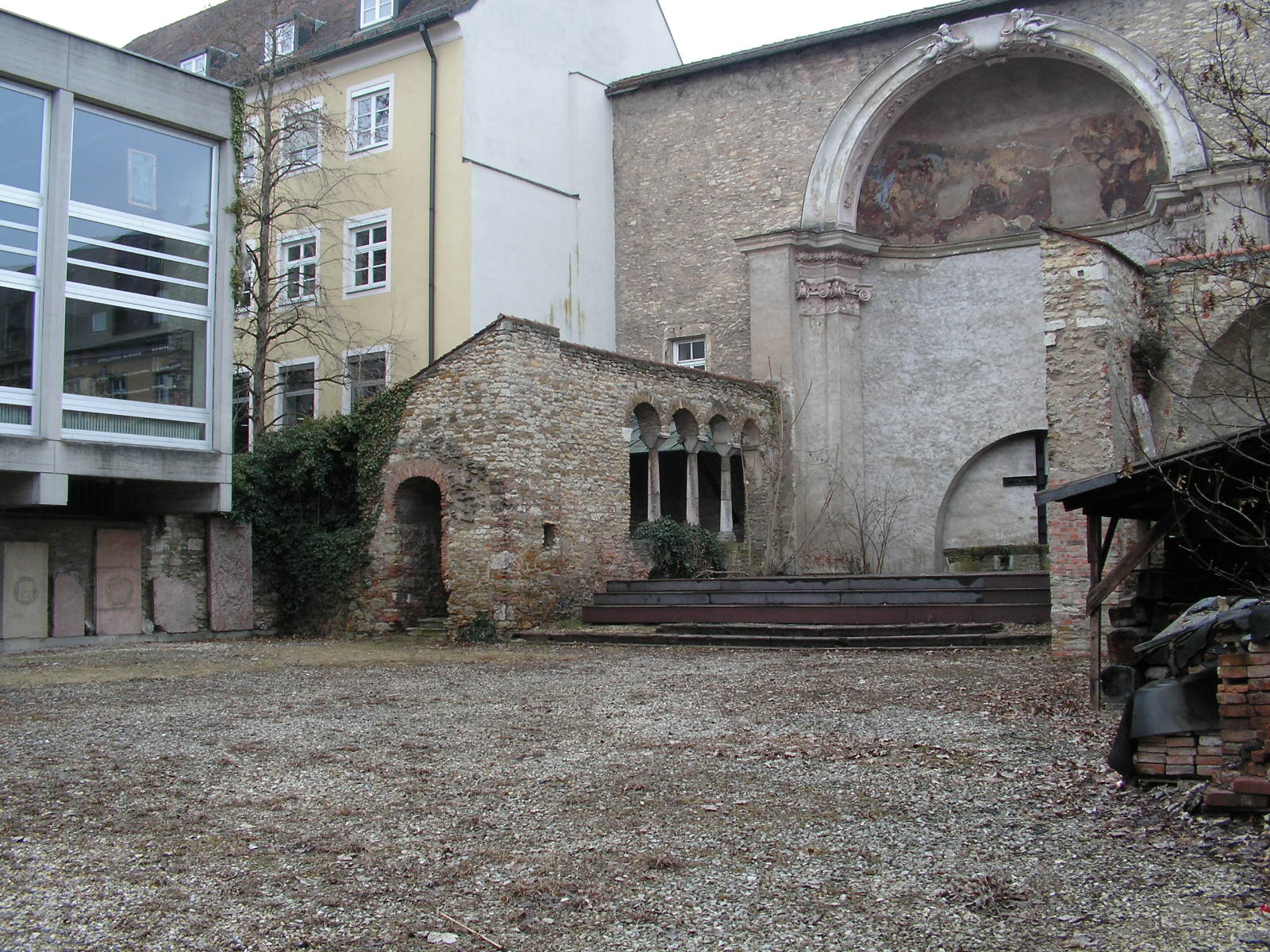
Ruin of the Collegiate Church of Obermünster in Regensburg, destroyed during an air raid

Repeated attempts to reform the rule of life and to return the house to its original Benedictine practice failed and in 1484 Obermünster formally became a collegiate house for noblewomen (adlige Frauenstift), which is what it had in any case been in practice for many years.

During the 17th and 18th centuries the buildings and church were refurbished in the Baroque style.

It was dissolved in 1810 during the secularisation of Bavaria. The last canonesses remained there in retirement until 1822, after which it became a seminary. In 1862 the episcopal boys' seminary was also established there.

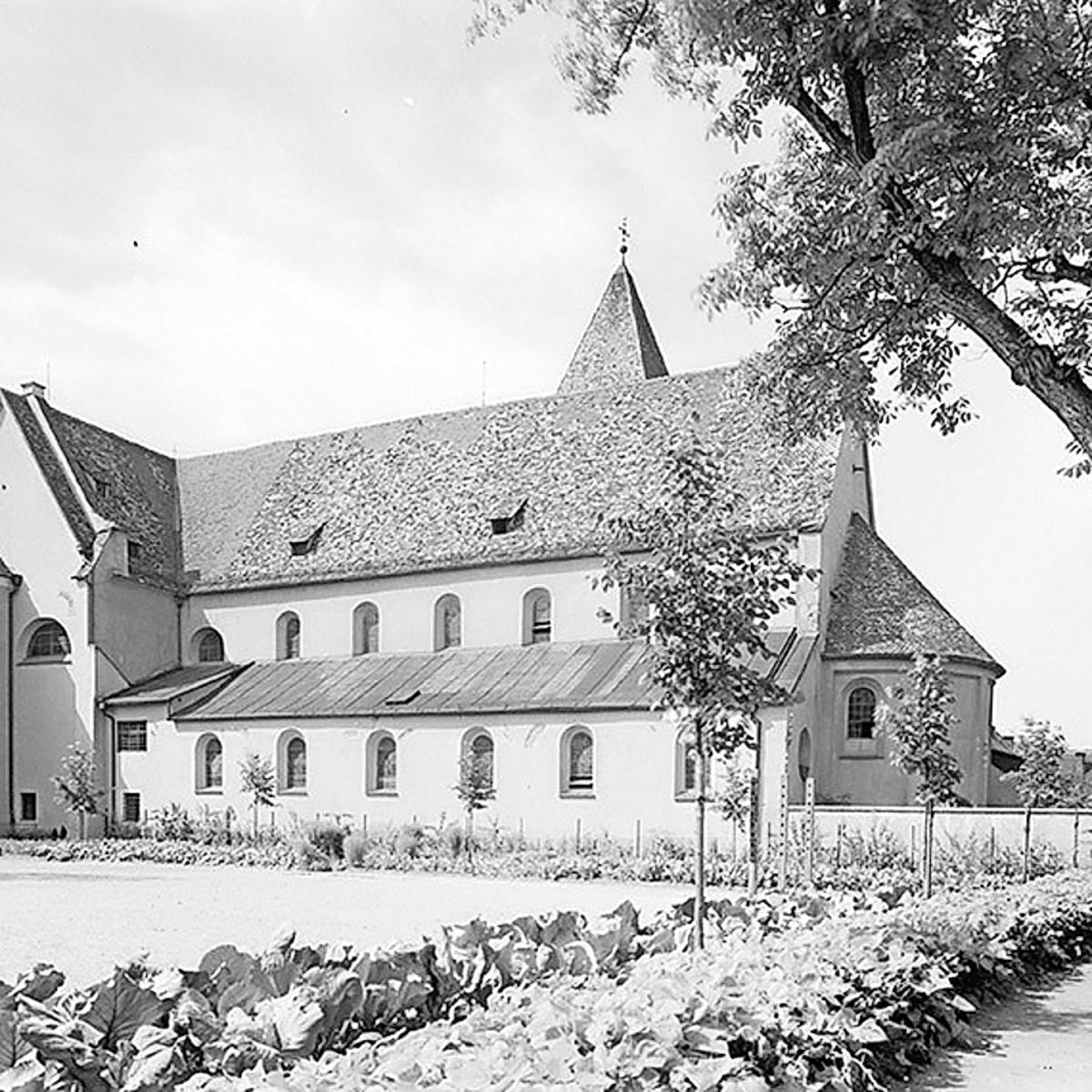
The Collegiate Church of Obermünster in 1925

In 1944 bombs destroyed the church and part of the claustral buildings. After the war the central episcopal archive, the library, part of the diocesan museum and other diocesan service functions were accommodated in the buildings that remained.

== Abbesses of Obermünster ==
- Hemma ?–876
- Mathilde c. 900/945
- Irmgard
- Salome
- Wikpurg 1020–29
- Willa 1052–89
- Hazecha 1089–?
- Hadamuda 1117
- Hadwiga 1142–77
- Euphemia von Helffenstein 1193
- Gertrud I 1216
- Jutta 1259
- Gertrud II 1265
- Wilburg von Leuchtenberg 1272
- Ryssa I von Leuchtenberg 1286–92
- Ryssa II von Dornberg 1299
- Bertha Walterin ?–1325
- Adelheid von Arenbach
- Katharina von Murach
- Agnes I von Wunebach ?–1374
- Elisabeth I von Parsberg 1374–1400
- Elisabeth II von Murach 1400–02
- Margarethe I Sattelbogerin ?–1435
- Barbara von Absberg 1435–56
- Kunigunde von Egloffstein 1456–79
- Sibylla von Paulsdorff 1479–1500
- Agnes II von Paulsdorff 1500–?
- Katharina II von Redwitz 1533–36, died 1560
- Wandula von Schaumberg 1536–42
- Barbara II von Sandizell ?–1564
- Barbara III Ratzin 1564–79
- Magdalena von Gleissenthal 1579–94
- Margarethe II Mufflin 1594–1608
- Katharina Praxedis von Perckhausen 1608–49
- Maria Elisabeth von Salis 1649–83
- Maria Theresia von Sandizell 1683–1719
- Anna Magdalena Franziska von Dondorff 1719–65
- Maria Franziska von Freudenberg 1765–75
- Maria Josepha von Neuenstein-Hubacker 1775–1803

== See also ==
- Niedermünster, Regensburg

== Sources ==
- (in German) Klöster in Bayern: Obermunster
