= Barbara von Absberg =

- Title: Abbess

Religious life
- Religion: Christianity
- Denomination: Catholic
- Sect: Obermünster, Regensburg

Senior posting
- Period in office: 1435 - 1456

Barbara von Absberg was abbess of Obermünster (higher monastery) in Regensburg from 1435 to 1456.

== Family ==
Barbara von Absberg was a member of the noble family House of Absberg. According to Johann Gottfried Biedermann, she is a daughter of Heinrich von und zu Absberg and Cunegunda, from the House of Liechtenstein. Her siblings were Georg, Walburga and Hans. Her sister Walburga lived in Niedermünster (lower monastery). According to Biedermann, Barbara was also abbess of Niedermünster. She probably died in 1456, because an abbess usually served for life. A close relative, Henry IV of Absberg, was from 1465 bishop of Regensburg.

== Literature ==
- Johann Gottfried Biedermann: Geschlechtsregister Der Reichsfrey unmittelbaren Ritterschaft Landes zu Franken Löblichen Orts an der Altmühl.... Bayreuth 1748. chart CLXX.
- Helmut Rischert: Die Burgen im Anlautertal II: Burgruine Rumburg, in: Sammelblatt des Historischen Vereins Eichstätt 76 (1983), p. 6–34.

== See also ==
- Catholic Church in Germany
