= Sebastian Stempfl =

Bishop in the Holy Roman Empire (died 1418)

- Born: Taisten, Puster Valley
- Occupation: Bishop of the Holy Roman Empire
- Known for: Succeeded Bishop Ulrich Prustl without influence

Sebastian Stempfl (died April 12, 1418) was the bishop of Brixen, a part of the Holy Roman Empire. On June 23, 1417, he was elected as a bishop to succeed Bishop Ulrich Prustl, without any aristocratic influence which was rather rare at the time.

== Life ==
Sebastian Stempfl was born to a father who was a judge in Taisten in Puister Valley. After finishing elementary education in Taisten, Sebastian went to study in Vienna and Bologna.

In 1399 he received a canonry in Brixen and became the dean of the San Candido collegiate church in 1404. His next promotion was as the dean of the Brixen cathedral.

=== Bishop election ===
Stempfl was elected as a Bishop of the Holy Roman Empire on the 23rd of June 1417 in the Brixen cathedral. The cathedral’s chapter elected him to succeed Bishop Ulrich Prustl without the influence of aristocracy or any regional prince.

The Archbishop of Salzburg confirmed the election, although a consecration by the Pope was impossible at the time due to religious schism.

=== Death ===
Bishop Stempfl had an untimely death in 1418 and he was buried in the Brixen Cathedral.
