= Limburg-Broich =

Limburg-Broich
1439–1508
Capital; Circle; Bench	Broich none none
Partitioned from Limburg-Hohenlimburg	1439
Extinct; to Daun-Frankenstein	1508

Broich was a Lordship of the Holy Roman Empire based around the castle of Broich in North Rhine-Westphalia, Germany. The Counts of Limburg Hohenlimburg and Broich ruled the Lordship of Broich. As from 1479, they ruled the Lordship of Broich and half of the County of Limburg (in condominium with Neuenahr-Alpen).

The Lordship of Broich was a strategic location of whose overlordship the powers of Westphalia and the Lower Rhine had fought over constantly, and the dispute continued after the creation of the line. In 1432 the Dukes of Cleves had succeeded in gaining overlordship from Berg, which led to the combined forces of Berg and the Archbishopric of Cologne capturing the territory in 1443, effectively destroying the castle of Broich.

Until 1449 the County of Limburg-Hohenlimburg-Broich was divided between the brothers count William and count Dietrich. In 1449 the counts of Limburg Hohenlimburg and Broich became embroiled in a succession dispute with Neuenahr-Alpen. The dispute quickly led to armed warfare, and in 1460 both parties were made subject to an arbitration of the Archbishop of Cologne. Since 1479 the county of Limburg Lenne was ruled in condominium between Dietrich and Von Neuenahr married with count William's onliest doughter. The County came to an end with Count John. In 1505 he married his adopted heiress Amoena of Sayn to Count Wirich V of Daun-Frankenstein, and with his death in 1508 the Castle and Lordship of Broich and his partitial rule in Limburg were inherited by them.

== Counts of Limburg-Broich (1439–1508) ==
Name	Reign
Henry	1439–1446
William	1446–1473
John	1473–1508
