= Agostino Fregoso =

Agostino Fregoso (1442–1486) was an Italian condottiero belonging to the Fregoso family of Genoa. He was also lord of Sant'Agata Feltria.

The son of three-time doge of Genoa Lodovico di Campofregoso, he moved from Genoa to the Marche to escape the feuds between his family and the Adorno. Here he resided at the court of Federico III da Montefeltro, whose daughter Gentile he married in 1476. As a dowry, he received twelve fiefs, the most important of which was Sant'Agata Feltria. His sons included Federigo, future cardinal and general, and Ottaviano, who would be the last doge from the Fregoso family.

In 1478-1484 Agostino fought against the Florentines for Sarzana, a Genoese lordship which his father had ceded to Florence. The struggle ended with the cession of the city to the Bank of St. George. In 1483, at Genoa as Captain of the Palace Guard, he helped archbishop Paolo Fregoso to become doge, against their relative Battista Fregoso. He subsequently resumed his career of soldier of venture, at Venice, Ravenna and finally for pope Innocent VIII, for whom he fought Ferdinand I of Naples. In 1486 he was ambushed and wounded at Altavilla Silentina while defending the castle of San Severino. He died at Mercato San Severino a few days later.

== Sources ==
- Serra, G. (1835). La storia della antica Liguria e di Genova. Tipografia Elvetica.
