= Fregoso =

Republic of Genoa family

- Country: Republic of Genoa
- Current region: Italy
- Founded: 13th century
- Titles: Doge of Genoa; Lord of Sarzana; Lord of Sant'Agata Feltria
- Dissolution: 1660

The Fregoso or Campofregoso were a noble family of the Republic of Genoa and Liguria in general, divided into numerous branches, whose members distinguished themselves on numerous historical occasions; many of them held the position of Doge of Genoa, some were also lords of Sarzana; others finally held various fiefdoms, lands and titles along the arc of the Ligurian Apennines, such as the county of Sant'Agata Feltria which was owned by Agostino Fregoso. The Fregoso family monopolized the Dogate's lifetime office, becoming the dynasty who produced the highest number of doges in the history of the Republic.

== History ==
Originating from the locality of Val Polcevera, on the hill above Rivarolo, they were enterprising merchants, active in the political affairs of the city from the 13th century, with Rolando, a castellan from Voltaggio, Gavi and Porto Venere.

The family had a strong influence on Genoese political life and thirteen members of the Fregoso family became doges; the first of them was Domenico di Campofregoso, but the most famous was certainly Paolo Fregoso, emblematic personage of a political history dominated by ambition and by the calculation of circumstances which was generally a characteristic of the family.

In addition to the Doges, other personalities distinguished themselves in various fields, military like Abraham, Augustine and Cesare Fregoso, writers like Antoniotto or ecclesiastics like Federigo Fregoso.

The Fregoso family lost its political importance in the first half of the 16th century with the end of the Dogate of Ottaviano Fregoso, imprisoned by the Spaniards and died in prison in Ischia. In 1528, the family was incorporated in the Alberghi of the families De Fornari and De Ferrari; resumed its name in 1576, but since then it no longer had any historical importance.

== Notable members ==
=== Doges of Genoa ===
- Battista I Fregoso
- Battista II Fregoso
- Domenico di Campofregoso
- Giacomo Fregoso
- Giano I di Campofregoso
- Giano II di Campofregoso
- Lodovico di Campofregoso
- Ottaviano Fregoso
- Pietro Fregoso
- Pietro di Campofregoso
- Paolo di Campofregoso
- Spinetta Fregoso
- Tomaso di Campofregoso

=== Others ===
- Agostino Fregoso: condottiero
- Cesare Fregoso: condottiero
- Paolo Battista Fregoso: condottiero
- Giano Fregoso, bishop of Agen
- Federigo Fregoso: Nobleman, prelate and general.
- Pomellina Fregoso: Lady Consort of Monaco by marriage to Jean I, Lord of Monaco, and the mother of Lord Catalan
- Galeotto di Campofregoso: Condottiero

== See also ==
- Doria (family)
- House of Grimaldi
- Adorno family
- House of Spinola
- Pallavicini family
- Fieschi family
