= 1461 =

1461 in various calendars
- Gregorian calendar: 1461; MCDLXI
- Ab urbe condita: 2214
- Armenian calendar: 910; ԹՎ ՋԺ
- Assyrian calendar: 6211
- Balinese saka calendar: 1382–1383
- Bengali calendar: 867–868
- Berber calendar: 2411
- English Regnal year: 39 Hen. 6 – 1 Edw. 4
- Buddhist calendar: 2005
- Burmese calendar: 823
- Byzantine calendar: 6969–6970
- Chinese calendar: 庚辰年 (Metal Dragon); 4158 or 3951 — to — 辛巳年 (Metal Snake); 4159 or 3952
- Coptic calendar: 1177–1178
- Discordian calendar: 2627
- Ethiopian calendar: 1453–1454
- Hebrew calendar: 5221–5222
- Hindu calendars
- Vikram Samvat: 1517–1518
- Shaka Samvat: 1382–1383
- Kali Yuga: 4561–4562
- Holocene calendar: 11461
- Igbo calendar: 461–462
- Iranian calendar: 839–840
- Islamic calendar: 865–866
- Japanese calendar: Kanshō 2 (寛正２年)
- Javanese calendar: 1377–1378
- Julian calendar: 1461; MCDLXI
- Korean calendar: 3794
- Minguo calendar: 451 before ROC 民前451年
- Nanakshahi calendar: −7
- Thai solar calendar: 2003–2004
- Tibetan calendar: ལྕགས་ཕོ་འབྲུག་ལོ་ (male Iron-Dragon); 1587 or 1206 or 434 — to — ལྕགས་མོ་སྦྲུལ་ལོ་ (female Iron-Snake); 1588 or 1207 or 435

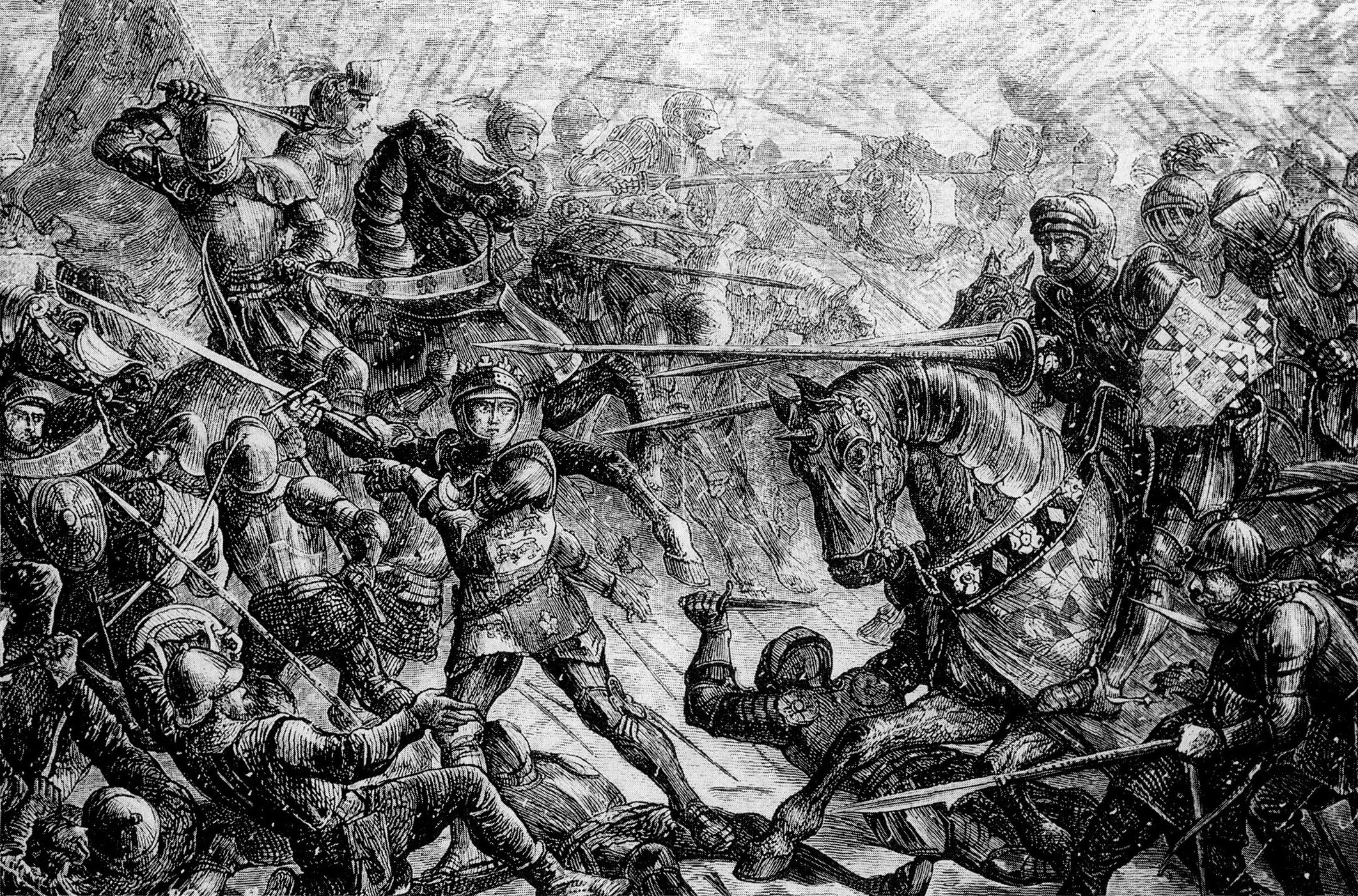
March 29: The Battle of Towton, the bloodiest to be fought on English soil, kills over 9,000 soldiers and completes Edward IV's triumph over Henry VI.(engraving by John Quartley, 1878)

Year 1461 (MCDLXI) was a common year starting on Thursday of the Julian calendar.

== Events ==
=== January–March ===
- January 12 – John Neville, a Yorkist who betrayed Richard of York at the Battle of Wakefield and joined the Lancastrians during the Wars of the Roses, leads troops on raids in northern England, pillaging Beverley
- January 22 – In Japan, where the Kansho famine has led to thousands of people starving to death, the shogun Ashikaga Yoshimasa orders relief efforts to be coordinated by Ganami, a Buddhist monk who leads the Kōfuku-ji temple.
- February 2 – After the "sun dog" (parhelion) weather phenomenon in England gives the illusion of three suns rising at dawn, Edward, Earl of March, leads the Yorkists to victory over the Lancastrians in battle at the Battle of Mortimer's Cross. Edward convinces his frightened troops that the three sunrises represents the Holy Trinity and divine support for the Yorkist cause. The Lancastrians, led by Owen Tudor and his son Jasper Tudor, Earl of Pembroke, are defeated, and Owen Tudor is taken prisoner and executed.
- February 17 – Second Battle of St Albans, England: The Earl of Warwick's army is defeated by a Lancastrian force under Queen Margaret, who recovers control for her husband.
- March 4 – Edward, Duke of York, son of the late Richard of York and heir to the English throne, seizes London, and proclaims himself King Edward IV.
- March 5 – Wars of the Roses: King Henry VI of England is deposed by Edward, Duke of York.
- March 29 – At the Battle of Towton in Yorkshire, the newly proclaimed Yorkist King Edward IV defeats the Lancastrians, led by the Duke of Somerset, to make good his claim to the English throne. The battle, which claims the lives of at least 6,000 supporters of King Henry VI and at least 3,000 of King Edward's men, remains one of the bloodiest battles ever fought on English soil.

=== April–June ===
- April 17 – Skanderbeg, ruler of Albania, reaches a three-year peace agreement with the Ottoman Empire.
- May 3 – Theodosius Byvaltsev is installed as the new leader of the Russian Orthodox Church as Metropolitan of Moscow and all the Russias by order of Vasily II Vasilyevich, Grand Prince of Moscow.
- May 15 – In Ireland, Fedlim Geancach Ó Conchobair becomes the last King of Connacht, now the Republic of Ireland's Province of Connaught and comprising what are now the Counties Galway, Leitrim, Mayo, Roscommon, and Sligo. Upon Fedlim's death in 1475,
- May 23 – King Edward IV summons the English Parliament for the first time, directing the members of the House of Lords and House of Commons to assemble at Westminster on November 4.
- May 28 – In Italy, King Ferdinand of Naples is forced to abandon the city of Venosa, the Albanian general Skanderbeg leads his cavalry in an attack on Venosa after an attack by the former king, Rene of Anjou and by General Jacopo Piccinino. Fleeing to Apulia, Ferdinand learns that the Albanian General Skanderbeg will soon arrive to fight the House of Anjou.
- June 28 – Edward, Richard of York's son, is crowned as Edward IV, King of England. He reigns until 1483.

=== July–September ===
- July 10 – Stephen Tomašević becomes the last King of Bosnia, on the death of his father Stephen Thomas.
- July 18 – In the Republic of Genoa in Italy, Spinetta Fregoso is elected by the republic's council as the new chief executive, the Doge. He remains in office for only six days before being forced to surrender to Lodovico di Campofregoso.
- July 22 – Louis XI succeeds Charles VII of France as king (reigns until 1483).
- July – The last remnant of the Byzantine Empire is lost to the Ottomans as General Graitzas Palaiologos honourably surrenders Salmeniko Castle, the last garrison of the Despotate of the Morea, to invading forces after a year-long siege.
- August 7 – The Ming Dynasty Chinese military general Cao Qin stages a coup against the Tianshun Emperor; after setting fire to the eastern and western gates of the Imperial City, Beijing (which are doused by pouring rains during the day-long uprising), Cao Qin finds himself hemmed in on all sides by imperial forces, loses three of his own brothers in the fight, and instead of facing execution, he flees to his home in the city, and commits suicide by jumping down a well located within his walled compound.
- August 15 –
  - The Empire of Trebizond, the last major Romano-Greek outpost, falls to the Ottoman Empire under Mehmed II, after a 21-day siege.
  - The coronation of Louis XI as King of France takes place at Reims.
- August 24 – The Angevins, led by Giovanni Antonio Orsini del Balzo, lift their siege of Barletta in the Kingdom of Naples when Ivan Strez Balšić arrives with cavalry and infantry to rescue King Ferrante. Orsini's erroneous belief that Skanderbeg has accompanied the Neapolitan Army is enough to cause him to order a withdrawal.
- September 4 – At Bidar, in what is now the Karnataka state of India, Nizam-Ud-Din Ahmad III becomes the new Sultan of Bahmani three days after the death of his father, Humayun Shah.
- September 30 – Pembroke Castle in Wales is surrendered to William Herbert, who has been sent by England's King Edward IV to remove Jasper Tudor, half-brother of the recently deposed King Henry VI. At the same time, Lord Herbert becomes the guardian of the four-year old Prince Henry Tudor, who will later become King Henry VII of England.

=== October–December ===
- October 19 – With the Yorkist victory in the War of the Roses, the proposal by the new English King, Edward IV for an alliance with Scottish nobles against the former King Henry VI is approved by Scottish Highland lords at Ardtornish Castle. The agreement will become the basis for the Treaty of Westminster four months later on February 13, 1462.
- November 4 – The English Parliament is opened at Westminster by King Edward IV, and the House of Commons elects James Strangeways as its Speaker.
- November 17 – The coronation of Stephen Tomašević as the King of Bosnia takes place at Saint Mary's Church at Jajce.
- November 27 – An earthquake estimated later at 6.4 magnitude occurs at L'Aquila in the Abruzzo region of the Kingdom of Naples and kills more than 80 people.
- December 21 – The first English Parliament under King Edward IV adjourns and the King gives royal assent to the Act titled "In eschewing of Ambiguities, Doubts, and Diversities of Opinions which may rise, ensue, or be taken of and upon judicial Acts and Eximplifications of same, made or had in the Time or Times of Henry the Fourth, Henry the Fifth His Son, and Henry the Sixth His Son or any of them, late Kings of England successively, in Deed and not of Right", designating which acts of this three immediate predecessors are repealed and which are renewed.
- December 28 – General Skanderbeg of Albania recaptures the fortress of Trani for the Kingdom of Naples after finding the rebel leader Fuscia de Foxa and 16 other rebels outside the walls of the city.

=== Date unknown ===
- Cirencester Grammar School is founded in southwest England by the Bishop of Durham.
- Leonardo da Vinci and Sandro Botticelli become students of Verrocchio.
- Sarajevo, capital of Bosnia and Herzegovina, is founded by the Ottomans.
- François Villon writes Le Grand Testament.

== Births ==
- February 6 – Džore Držić, Croatian poet and playwright (d. 1501)
- February 19 – Domenico Grimani, Italian nobleman (d. 1523)
- March 11 – Diego Hurtado de Mendoza, 3rd Duke of the Infantado, Spanish noble (d. 1531)
- April 3 – Anne of France, French princess regent, eldest daughter of Louis XI of France and Charlotte of Savoy (d. 1522)
- May 3 – Raffaele Riario, Italian cardinal (d. 1521)
- May 25 – Zanobi Acciaioli, librarian of the Vatican (d. 1519)
- August 5 – Alexander Jagiellon, King of Poland (d. 1506)
- September 15 – Jacopo Salviati, Italian politician and son-in-law of Lorenzo de' Medici (d. 1533)
- October 1 – Amalie of Brandenburg, Countess Palatine and Duchess of Zweibruecken and Veldenz (d. 1481)
- December 28 – Louise of Savoy, Nun (d. 1503)
- date unknown
  - Alessandro Alessandri, Italian jurist (d. 1523)
  - Bohuslav Hasištejnský z Lobkovic, Bohemian nobleman (d. 1510)
  - Nicholas West, English bishop and diplomat (d. 1533)

== Deaths ==
- February 2 – Owen Tudor, Welsh founder of the Tudor dynasty (executed)
- March 28 – John Clifford, 9th Baron de Clifford (in battle)
- March 29
  - Henry Percy, 3rd Earl of Northumberland (in battle) (b. 1421)
  - Lionel de Welles, 6th Baron Welles
- April 8 – Georg von Peuerbach, Austrian astronomer (b. 1423)
- May 15 – Domenico Veneziano, Italian painter (b. c. 1410)
- July 22 – King Charles VII of France (b. 1403)
- September 21 – Sophia of Halshany, queen consort of Poland (b. 1405)
- September 23 – Charles, Prince of Viana, King of Navarre (b. 1421)
- October 7 – Jean Poton de Xaintrailles, follower of Joan of Arc (b. c. 1390)
- November 6 – John de Mowbray, 3rd Duke of Norfolk (b. 1415)
- probable – Jonah, Metropolitan of Moscow
