= Giano di Campofregoso =

Giano di Campofregoso or Giano Fregoso may refer to the following members of the Campofregoso family of Genoa:

- Giano I di Campofregoso
- Giano II di Campofregoso
