= Barnaba Adorno =

Doge of the Republic of Genoa

30th Doge of the Republic of Genoa
- In office 4 January 1447 – 30 January 1447
- Preceded by: Raffaele Adorno
- Succeeded by: Giano I di Campofregoso

Personal details
- Born: 1385 Genoa, Republic of Genoa
- Died: 1459 (aged 73–74) Genoa, Republic of Genoa

Barnaba Adorno (Genoa, 1385 - Genoa, 1459) was the 30th Doge of the Republic of Genoa.

== Biography ==
Born in Genoa around 1385, he was the nephew of the former Doges Giorgio Adorno and Antoniotto Adorno, the latter elected to the dogal office four times. Engaged in commercial traffic in the eastern Genoese colonies, especially in Chios, he participated together with other members of his family in military operations against the dominion of the Visconti family in the territories of the Republic of Genoa.

Upon the resignation of his cousin Raffaele Adorno, Barnaba Adorno took over as the new Doge of Genoa, the thirtieth in republican history. This mandate, however, even for the opposition maneuvers of the Fregosos, did not last even a month and on 30 January forced him to flee the Genoese capital.

Adorno presumably died in Genoa in 1459.

== See also ==
- Doge of Genoa
- Republic of Genoa
- Adorno family
