= 1436 =

1436 in various calendars
- Gregorian calendar: 1436; MCDXXXVI
- Ab urbe condita: 2189
- Armenian calendar: 885; ԹՎ ՊՁԵ
- Assyrian calendar: 6186
- Balinese saka calendar: 1357–1358
- Bengali calendar: 842–843
- Berber calendar: 2386
- English Regnal year: 14 Hen. 6 – 15 Hen. 6
- Buddhist calendar: 1980
- Burmese calendar: 798
- Byzantine calendar: 6944–6945
- Chinese calendar: 乙卯年 (Wood Rabbit); 4133 or 3926 — to — 丙辰年 (Fire Dragon); 4134 or 3927
- Coptic calendar: 1152–1153
- Discordian calendar: 2602
- Ethiopian calendar: 1428–1429
- Hebrew calendar: 5196–5197
- Hindu calendars
- Vikram Samvat: 1492–1493
- Shaka Samvat: 1357–1358
- Kali Yuga: 4536–4537
- Holocene calendar: 11436
- Igbo calendar: 436–437
- Iranian calendar: 814–815
- Islamic calendar: 839–840
- Japanese calendar: Eikyō 8 (永享８年)
- Javanese calendar: 1351–1352
- Julian calendar: 1436; MCDXXXVI
- Korean calendar: 3769
- Minguo calendar: 476 before ROC 民前476年
- Nanakshahi calendar: −32
- Thai solar calendar: 1978–1979
- Tibetan calendar: ཤིང་མོ་ཡོས་ལོ་ (female Wood-Hare); 1562 or 1181 or 409 — to — མེ་ཕོ་འབྲུག་ལོ་ (male Fire-Dragon); 1563 or 1182 or 410

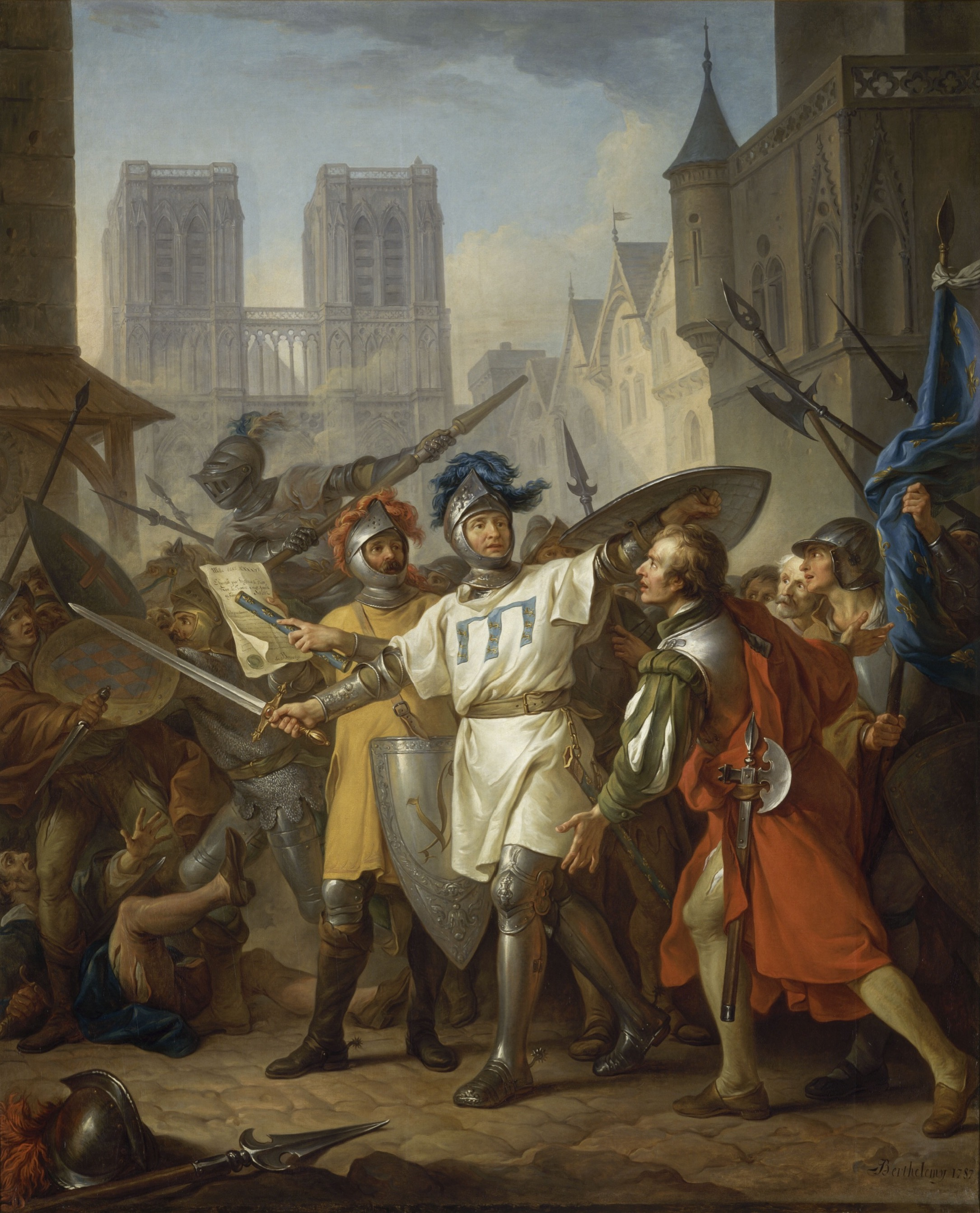
April 17: The French Army recaptures control of Paris and drives out the English occupying forces. (1787 painting by Jean-Simon Berthélémy)

August 30: The Cathedral of Santa Maria del Fiore is dedicated in Florence.

Year 1436 (MCDXXXVI) was a leap year starting on Sunday of the Julian calendar.

== Events ==
=== January–March ===
- January 11 – Erik of Pomerania is deposed from the Swedish throne for the second time, only three months after having been reinstated. Engelbrekt Engelbrektsson remains the leader of the land, in his capacity of rikshövitsman, the military commander of the realm.
- February 14 – In Yemen, the Imam Al-Mansur Ali bin Salah ad-Din of the Zaidi state becomes of one of the victims of a plague sweeping the kingdom. His son, an-Nasir Muhammad, becomes the new Imam but dies four weeks later.
- February – Karl Knutsson Bonde becomes the Rikshövitsman of the Swedish military jointly with Engelbrekt. The two will share the title until Engelbrekt's death two months later.
- March 21 – Italian archaeologist Cyriacus of Ancona, exploring at the Greek village of Kastri) rediscovers the site of Delphi, eight centuries after it had been abandoned. More than four more centuries will pass before the ruins of the Temple of Apollo, the workplace of the Oracle of Delphi, will be found.
- March 25 (New Year's Day in local calendars) – Pope Eugene IV consecrates Florence Cathedral. Construction had started 140 years earlier in 1296 and is nearly complete with the finishing of a dome that has been engineered by Filippo Brunelleschi. The dome itself would be dedicated five months later.
- March 28 – In Italy, the Republic of Genoa is revived after having been under the control of the Duchy of Milan for almost 15 years, and the 56-year-old mercenary leader Isnardo Guarco is elected as the Doge of Genoa, with a lifetime appointment, but is deposed only one week later.

=== April–July ===
- April 4 – After entering the city of Genoa with several thousand men, former Doge Tomaso di Campofregoso reclaims leadership of the Republic of Genoa.
- April 17 – Hundred Years War: Paris is recaptured from the English by French forces.
- May 4 – Swedish leader Engelbrekt Engelbrektsson is assassinated by aristocrat Måns Bengtsson while he is on his way to Stockholm for negotiations. Karl Knutsson Bonde temporarily holds the position of leader of Sweden alone. The first meeting of the Riksdag of the Estates of Sweden takes place afterwards, in Uppsala.
- June 25
  - Scottish princess Margaret Stewart marries the future French king Louis XI in Tours.
  - The Incorporated Guild of Smiths in Newcastle upon Tyne (England) is founded.

=== July–September ===
- July 5 – The Hussite Wars effectively end in Bohemia. Sigismund is accepted as King.
- July 29 – French forces abandon their Siege of Calais.
- August 30 – Brunelleschi's Dome at Florence Cathedral is dedicated.
- August 31 – An attempt by Spain to recapture Gibraltar from the Moors fails as the expedition leader Enrique Pérez de Guzmán drowns along with 40 of his men after reaching the shore.
- September 1 – Eric of Pomerania is once again reinstated as king of Sweden. Karl Knutsson, at the same time, resigns the post of rikshövitsman.
- September 10 – At the Battle of Piperdean, fought near the border between Scotland and England, a force of 4,000 English troops led by the George de Dunbar and the Earl of Northumberland to take back Dunbar Castle is repelled by the Earl of Angus, who as Warden of the Scottish Marches. The Scots surprise the marching English troops and kill an estimated 1,500 men, including 40 knights, while losing 200 men of their own.
- September 15 – Pope Eugene IV issues a supplement to his papal bull of 1435, Sicut dudum (which banned enslavement by Portugal of the people of the Canary Islands), by another bull, Romanus Pontifex, allowing Portugal to conquer any of the Islands that had not yet been converted to Christianity.

=== October–December ===
- October 1 – King James I of Scotland gives royal assent to numerous acts recently passed by the Scottish parliament, including the Place of Trial Act ("That the kingis Justice hald the law quhair the trespes wes done."), the Englishmen Act ("of assoverance and proteccion be Inglismen"), the Selling Salmon to English Men Act and the Import of Bullion Act.
- October 6 – The University of Turin, originally created in 1404 is re-established in Turin in Italy after having been absent since 1427. Prince Ludovico of Savoy grants ducal licenses to set up colleges of Law, of Arts and Medicine, and of Theology.
- October 29 – The regents for King Henry VI summon members of the English Parliament to assemble on January 21 at Westminster.
- November 10 – The treaty between the Republic of Venice and the Byzantine Empire is renewed for five years in a signing at Constantinople.
- December 20 – King Charles VII of France arrives at Lyon to personally begin an inquiry into the rebellion that had lasted in the city for two months, ending on June 6, 1436. Ultimately, three rebels are executed and 120 others are permanently banished from Lyon.
- December 30 – In the Holy Roman Empire, at Heidelberg, 13-year-old Ludwig IV of Wittelsbach becomes the new Elector of Palatine, one of the seven imperial electors and ruler of the Rhineland, upon the death of his father, Ludwig III. During his minority, Ludwig IV is guided by his uncle and guardian, Otto of Mosbach.

=== Date unknown ===
- Vlad II Dracul seizes the recently vacated throne of Wallachia, with Hungarian support.
- The Bosnian language is first mentioned in a document.
- Date of the Visokom papers, the last direct sources on the old town of Visoki.
- In Ming dynasty China, the inauguration of the Zhengtong-era Emperor Yingzong of Ming takes place.
- In Ming dynasty China, a significant portion of the southern grain tax is commuted to payments in silver, known as the Gold Floral Silver (jinhuayin). This comes about due to officials' and military generals' increasing demands to be paid in silver instead of grain, as commercial transactions draw more silver into nationwide circulation. Some counties have trouble transporting all the required grain to meet their tax quotas, so it makes sense to pay the government in silver, a medium of exchange that is already abundant amongst landowners, through their own private commercial affairs.
- The Florentine polymath Leon Battista Alberti begins writing the treatise On Painting, in which he argues for the importance of mathematical perspective, in the creation of three-dimensional vision on a two-dimensional plane. This follows the ideas of Masaccio, and his concepts of linear perspective and vanishing point in artwork.
- Afonso Gonçalves Baldaia becomes the first European to explore the western coast of Africa, past the Tropic of Cancer.
- Johannes Gutenberg begins work on the printing press.

== Births ==
- January 20 – Ashikaga Yoshimasa, Japanese shōgun (d. 1490)
- January 26 – Henry Beaufort, 3rd Duke of Somerset, Lancastrian military commander during the English Wars of the Roses (d. 1464)
- February 26 – Imagawa Yoshitada, 9th head of the Imagawa clan in Japan (d. 1476)
- April 4 – Amalia of Saxony, Duchess of Bavaria-Landshut (d. 1501)
- June 6 – Regiomontanus, German astronomer (d. 1476)
- November 5 – Richard Grey, 3rd Earl of Tankerville, English nobleman, attainted as a Yorkist supporter during the Wars of the Roses (d. 1466)
- November 16 – Leonardo Loredan, Doge of Venice (d. 1521)
- November 26 – Princess Catherine of Portugal, nun and writer (d. 1463)
- date unknown
  - Sheikh Hamdullah, Anatolian Islamic calligrapher (d. 1520)
  - Francisco Jiménez de Cisneros, Spanish cardinal and statesman (d. 1517)
  - Hernando del Pulgar, Spanish writer (d. c. 1492)
  - Abi Ahmet Celebi, chief physician of the Ottoman Empire (writer of a study on kidney and bladder stones; supporter of the research of Jewish doctor Musa Colinus ul-Israil on the application of drugs; founder of the first Ottoman medical school)

== Deaths ==
- Winter – Alexander I Aldea, Prince of Wallachia (probably of illness) (b.1397)
- May 4 – Engelbrekt Engelbrektsson, Swedish statesman and rebel leader (murdered) (b. c. 1390)
- October 8 – Jacqueline, Countess of Hainaut, Dutch sovereign (b. 1401)
- December 30 – Louis III, Elector Palatine (b. 1378)
- date unknown – Qāḍī Zāda al-Rūmī, Persian mathematician (b. 1364)
