= 1415 =

1415 in various calendars
- Gregorian calendar: 1415; MCDXV
- Ab urbe condita: 2168
- Armenian calendar: 864; ԹՎ ՊԿԴ
- Assyrian calendar: 6165
- Balinese saka calendar: 1336–1337
- Bengali calendar: 821–822
- Berber calendar: 2365
- English Regnal year: 2 Hen. 5 – 3 Hen. 5
- Buddhist calendar: 1959
- Burmese calendar: 777
- Byzantine calendar: 6923–6924
- Chinese calendar: 甲午年 (Wood Horse); 4112 or 3905 — to — 乙未年 (Wood Goat); 4113 or 3906
- Coptic calendar: 1131–1132
- Discordian calendar: 2581
- Ethiopian calendar: 1407–1408
- Hebrew calendar: 5175–5176
- Hindu calendars
- Vikram Samvat: 1471–1472
- Shaka Samvat: 1336–1337
- Kali Yuga: 4515–4516
- Holocene calendar: 11415
- Igbo calendar: 415–416
- Iranian calendar: 793–794
- Islamic calendar: 817–818
- Japanese calendar: Ōei 22 (応永２２年)
- Javanese calendar: 1329–1330
- Julian calendar: 1415; MCDXV
- Korean calendar: 3748
- Minguo calendar: 497 before ROC 民前497年
- Nanakshahi calendar: −53
- Thai solar calendar: 1957–1958
- Tibetan calendar: ཤིང་ཕོ་རྟ་ལོ་ (male Wood-Horse); 1541 or 1160 or 388 — to — ཤིང་མོ་ལུག་ལོ་ (female Wood-Sheep); 1542 or 1161 or 389

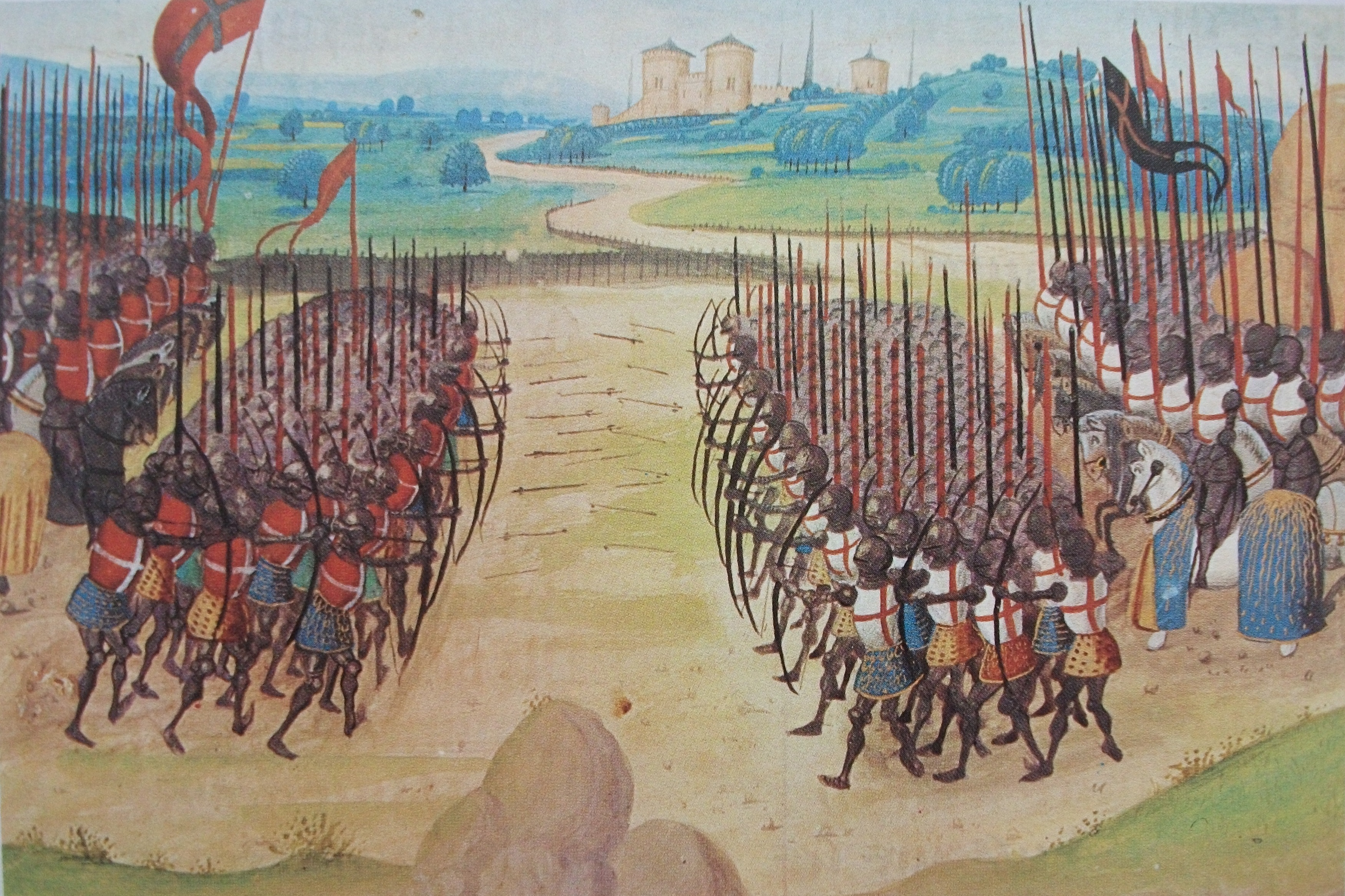
October 25: English archers defeat larger force of French knights at Battle of Agincourt.

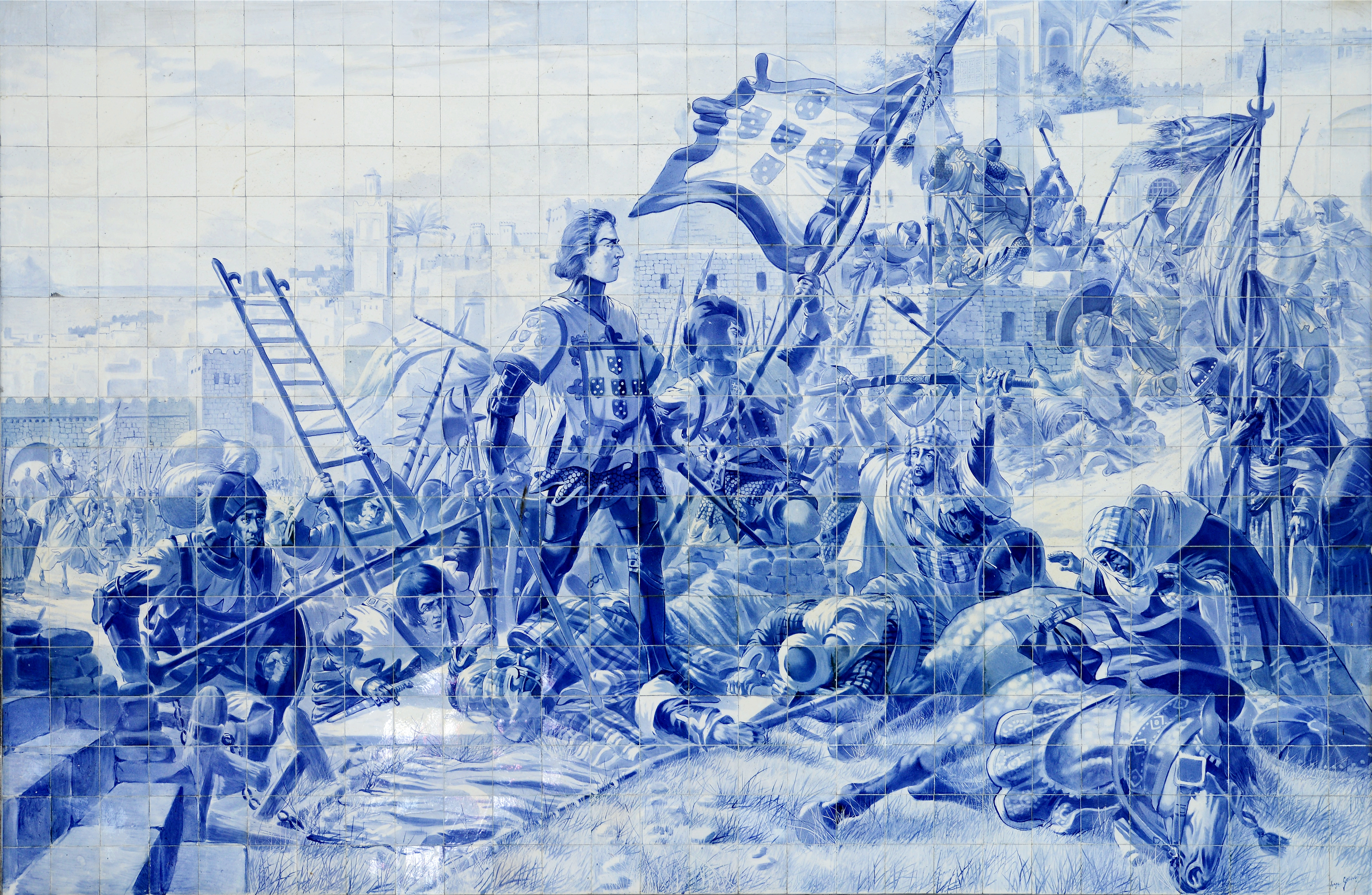
The Age of Discovery begins with the Portuguese conquest of Ceuta.

Year 1415 (MCDXV) was a common year starting on Tuesday of the Julian calendar.

== Events ==
=== January–March ===
- January 24 – France and England agree to extend their truce in the ongoing Burgundian War after the English Bishop of Durham and of Norwich meet with representatives of King Charles VI, prolonging a ceasefire until May 1.
- January 30 – (19th day of 12th month Ōei 21) Shoko is formally enthroned as the new Emperor of Japan, more than two years after the abdication of his father, the Emperor Go-Komatsu.
- February 22 –
  - Forty Years' War: (Full moon of Tabaung 776 ME) In what is now Myanmar, Razadarit, ruler of the Hanthawaddy kingdom, authorizes a plan to fight the forces of Minkhaung I ruler of the Ava Kingdom. King Razadarit leads the invasion on March 2 (8th waning of Tabaung 776 ME).
  - King Charles VI of France and John the Fearless, Duke of Burgundy, sign the Treaty of Arras.
- March 2 – At the Council of Constance, the Antipope John XXIII, chosen at the Council of Pisa, promises that he will resign all claims to leadership of the Roman Catholic Church.
- March 13 – (4th waxing of Tagu 776 ME) At the decisive Battle of Dala in Myanmar, Crown Prince Minye Kyawswa of Ava leads his troops in the battle against the army of King Razdarit of Hanthawaddy. Prince Kyawswa is killed, but King Minkhaung's troops defeat the Hanthawaddy invaders and force their retreat.Yazawin Thit The loss for King Razdarit comes despite the advice of his astrologers for the date of the attack.
- March 20 – Despite his promise to resign, the Antipope John XXIII escapes the city of Constance and takes refuge in the Duchy of Austria at Schaffhausen.
- March 23 – Giorgio Adorno resigns as the Doge of Genoa despite having been appointed for life.
- March 29 – Barnaba Guano is elected as the new Doge of the Republic of Genoa.

=== April–June ===
- April 6 – The decree Haec sancta synodus is approved by the Council of Constance and sets the precedent that an ecumenical council of cardinals and bishops has superiority over the Pope. The decree provides that a council "legitimately assembled in the Holy Spirit... has power immediately from Christ; and that everyone of whatever state or dignity, even papal (in the Latin text,etiam si papalis), is bound to obey it in those matters which pertain to the faith."
- April 30 – Frederick I becomes Elector of Brandenburg.
- May 4 – The Council of Constance declares that the late English theologian John Wycliffe (1328-1384) was a heretic and bans his writings, as well as directing that his work be burned, and that Wycliffe's remains be removed from their burial site on consecrated church ground. The order will be carried out 13 years later in 1428.
- May 11 – From Valencia in Spain, the Antipope Benedict XIII issues a papal bull with eleven prohibitions against Jews, including a ban on teaching, reading or possessing the Talmud; prohibition of Jewish possession of Christian artifacts or Christian books; limiting each town to only one synagogue; barring Jews from serving specific jobs or making contracts; segregating Jews from Christians in all public places; and requiring all Jews to wear "a red and yellow sign" on their clothes. Jews who convert to the Roman Catholic faith become exempt from the restrictions
- May 29 – The Council of Constance approves an order dismissing, in absentia the Antipope John XXIII, who had been chosen by the Council of Pisa, from any authority over the Roman Catholic Church.
- June 5 – The Council of Constance condemns the writings of John Wycliffe and asks Jan Hus to recant in public his heresy; after his denial, he is tried for heresy, excommunicated, then sentenced to be burned at the stake.

=== July–September ===
- July 4 – Pope Gregory XII officially opens the Council of Constance, and then abdicates. He is the last pope to resign, until Pope Benedict XVI in 2013.
- July 6 – Jan Hus is burned at the stake in Konstanz.
- July 18 – Sigismund, King of the Romans, departs from the meeting of the Council of Constance on a special trip to Perpignan, in order to secure the resignation of the antipope Benedict XIII in order to end the Western Schism, and then to try to end the wars between France and England, and Poland and the Teutonic Knights.
- July 31 – King Henry V of England is informed of the Southampton Plot against him; he has the leaders arrested and executed, before invading France.
- August 21 – Conquest of Ceuta: Portugal conquers the city of Ceuta from the Moors, initiating the Portuguese Empire, and European expansion and colonialism.
- September 20 – Sigismund, King of the Germans, who convened the Council of Constance, meets in Spain with the antipope Benedict XIII, and makes an unsuccessful attempt to persuade Benedict to resign.

=== October–December ===
- October 25 – Battle of Agincourt: Archers, led by Henry V of England are instrumental in defeating a larger army of French knights. Edward, 2nd Duke of York is killed in the battle, along with the French commander, Charles I d'Albret, Constable of Paris, and the second-in-command, John I, Duke of Alençon.
- November 4 – The English Parliament is opened by King Henry V for an 8-day session.
- November 5 – In an attempt to resolve the Brandenburg–Pomeranian conflict in Germany, Frederick I of Brandenburg pledges his 3-year-old daughter, Magadalene for a future marriage to Wartislaw IX, the 15-year-old Duke of Pomerania-Wolgast. Magdalene and Wartislaw marry other people after they grow up.
- November 12 – The English Parliament is closed after accomplishing the passage of the Money Act 1415, upgrading the penalty for importing or offering in payment "any sort of money forbidden by former statutes" to a felony.
- December 16 – The Treaty of Eberswalde is signed between Pomerania-Stettin (ruled by Otto II and Casimir V) and Brandenburg (ruled by the Elector Frederick I), temporarily ending the Uckermark War between the two duchies. In return for payment by Brandenburg, Pomerania-Stettin gives up Uckermark, Boitzenburg and Zehdenick.
- December 18 – Jean de Touraine becomes the new Dauphin of France, heir to the throne, upon the death of his older brother Louis, Duke of Guyenne. Jean dies on April 5, 1417, five years before the death of his father, King Charles VI of France.

=== Date unknown ===
- Antipope Benedict XIII orders all Talmuds to be delivered to the diocese, and held until further notice.
- The Swiss Confederation takes the territory of Aargau from the house of Habsburg.
- The Grand Canal of China is reinstated by this year after it had fallen out of use; restoration began in 1411, and was a response by the Emperor Cheng Zu of the Ming Dynasty to improve the grain shipment system of tribute traveling from south to north, towards his new capital at Beijing. With this action, the food supply crisis is solved by the end of the year.

== Births ==
- March 10 – Vasily II of Moscow, Grand Prince (d. 1462)
- March 14 – Wilhelm II, Princely count of Henneberg-Schleusingen (d. 1444)
- May 3 – Cecily Neville, English duchess, mother of Edward IV and Richard III of England (d. 1495)
- September 12 – John Mowbray, 3rd Duke of Norfolk, English magnate (d. 1461)
- September 16 – Elizabeth de Beauchamp, Baroness Bergavenny, English baroness (d. 1448)
- September 21 – Frederick III, Holy Roman Emperor (d. 1493)
- October 18 – Heinrich von Dissen, German theologian (d. 1484)
- November 26 – Han Myŏnghoe, Korean politician (d. 1487)
- December 1 – Jan Długosz, Polish historian (d. 1480)
- date unknown
  - Benedetto Accolti, Italian jurist and historian (d. 1464)
  - Rennyo, Japanese Buddhist leader (d. 1499)
  - Chakkaphat Phaen Phaeo, Lan Xang king (d. 1481)

== Deaths ==
- April 15 – Manuel Chrysoloras, Greek humanist
- July 6 – Jan Hus, Bohemian reformer (burned at the stake) (b. 1369)
- July 19 – Philippa of Lancaster, queen of John I of Portugal (plague) (b. 1359)
- August 2 – Thomas Grey, conspirator against King Henry V (executed) (b. 1384)
- August 5
  - Richard of Conisburgh, 3rd Earl of Cambridge (executed) (b. 1375)
  - Henry Scrope, 3rd Baron Scrope of Masham (executed) (b. 1370)
- September 17 – Michael de la Pole, 2nd Earl of Suffolk (killed in battle) (b. 1367)
- October 13 – Thomas FitzAlan, 12th Earl of Arundel, English military leader (b. 1381)
- October 25 (killed in Battle of Agincourt)
  - John I, Duke of Alençon (b. 1385)
  - Charles I d'Albret, Count of Dreux and Constable of France
  - Anthony of Brabant (b. 1384)
  - Michael de la Pole, 3rd Earl of Suffolk (b. 1394)
  - Frederick of Lorraine, Count of Vaudémont (b. 1371)
  - Philip II of Nevers (b. 1389)
  - Edward, 2nd Duke of York (b. 1373)
  - Dafydd Gam, Welsh nobleman (b. c. 1380)
