= Battista Fregoso =

Battista Fregoso may refer to:

- Battista Fregoso (1380–1442), doge of Genoa
- Battista Fregoso (1452–1504), doge of Genoa
- Paolo Battista Fregoso (died 1557), condottiero
