= Giano I di Campofregoso =

31st Doge of Genoa (1405–1448)

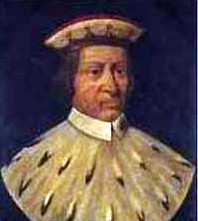

31st Lifetime Doge of the Republic of Genoa
- In office 30 January 1447 – 16 December 1448
- Preceded by: Barnaba Adorno
- Succeeded by: Lodovico di Campofregoso

Personal details
- Born: 1405 Genoa, Republic of Genoa
- Died: 16 December 1448 (aged 42–43) Genoa, Republic of Genoa
- Spouse(s): Violante di Brando; Drusiana Sforza

Giano I di Campofregoso (died 16 December 1448) was the 31st Doge of the Republic of Genoa.

== Biography ==
Son of Bartolomeo Fregoso and Caterina Ordelaffi, daughter of the lord of Forlì Antonio I Ordelaffi, he was born in Genoa around 1405. Grandson of the three-time doge Tomaso di Campofregoso. Giano Fregoso was educated in literary subjects, politics, use of weapons and in the management of the flourishing commercial traffic that his family had in the Genoese colonies in the east.

Precisely on behalf of his uncle-doge he fought between 1436 and 1437 in the Alessandrian domains of the Republic of Genoa conquering the local castle of Voltaggio, destroying the troops of the Duchy of Milan of Filippo Maria Visconti and other victorious clashes in Gavi.

In 1438, still during the dogate of Tomaso di Campofregoso, he quelled a revolt led by Giovanni Antonio Fieschi and in the same year he was appointed governor of Corsica, a position he held for six years. The Corsican chronicles will testify to a decidedly negative and power government by Fregoso, but these reports, also in the opinion of the historians themselves, should however be sought in the well-known bad coexistence and hostility between the locals and the Genoese dominion on the island that have always generated clashes or different interpretations of the facts. Still in 1438 he participated in the struggle of René of Anjou, supported by Genoa, against Alfonso V of Aragon in the war of succession for the throne of the Kingdom of Naples; Giano Fregoso, in exchange for the aid provided, was invested by the Anjou the title of count of Traetto (present day Minturno).

Called back to Genoa in December 1442 to the rescue of his uncle Doge Tomaso di Campofregoso, he could not do anything against the subsequent deposition of the latter and which led, after a monthly government of eight Captains of Liberty, to the election of the new doge Raffaele Adorno.

Refugee in Corsica to avoid a probable imprisonment by Adorno, he found on his arrival on the island a situation unfavorable to him consequently to the fresh appointment of the two new Genoese governors, Antonio and Nicolò Montaldo, who, in fact, took his place . Now confined to his island possessions, and surrounded by the troops of the ruling governors on behalf of the Republic of Genoa, he tried after a few months on the defensive to negotiate with the new governor Giovanni Montaldo a division of power with the division of Corsica into two mega areas, the first under Genoese influence and second under his control and other local squires. The agreement between the two, however, was short-lived as his brother, Lodovico di Campofregoso was captured and imprisoned, accepting the surrender of hostility on the island with the Genoese dominion in 1444.

In that year, on the advice of his uncle Tomaso di Campofregoso, he prepared his personal "revenge" against the Adornos aiming, if possible, also to his triumphant return to power over Genoa. A peace treaty was signed with Duke Visconti (1444), he moved from the Sarzana family fiefdom to Nice where he made an agreement (1446) with the ambassadors of Charles VII of France, bartering the submission of the Genoese republic in exchange for economic or financial aid. The most propitious situation to implement his plan took in January 1447 with the dissatisfaction of the Genoese people towards the stave of Barnaba Adorno. On the night of January 29, Campofregoso made his armed entrance in Genoa, conquered the Doge's Palace and after a fierce fight he drove the doge Adorno away. On the morning of January 30, by popular acclamation, the thirty-first doge of the republic was elected.

== Life as Doge ==
The dogate of Giano di Campofregoso immediately had to face the internal problems related to the historical enmities of his family with the Adorno and the Fieschi, but also in the Italian and European scenario the figure of the new doge had to respond to the problems that arose with the French crown of Charles VII for failure to comply with the agreements of 1446, with the Crown of Aragon, that previously allied to the two doges Raffaele Adorno and Barnaba Adorno, and with the Duchy of Milan. The unfavorable situation for the new Doge changed, however, little by little with the death of Filippo Maria Visconti, who, due to a dispute over the succession, "messed up" the international chessboard and looked away at Genoa. France itself of Charles VII was more concerned with reorganizing the defenses, and above all the economic resources, after the Hundred Years' War against the Kingdom of England.

For his part, Campofragoso sought an anti-Aragonese alliance with the Milanese Duke, Francesco I Sforza, financing the latter in his cause of succession with about 10,000 ducats, regulating with the Milanese state the new borders with the Genoese republic, also granting a large autonomy to the important fiefdom of Novi, and marrying Drusiana Sforza, the daughter of Ludovico. The relationship with Galeotto Del Carretto, lord of the Marquisate of Finale was more difficult and contrasted, which during the Campofregoso's Dogate repeatedly plundered and attacked several centers and territories controlled by the Genoese republic. The doge also sought a peaceful agreement, even combining marital ties, which eventually became a clash in the end of 1447 and the beginning of 1448 when two armed ships and an army of 8000 soldiers were sent to the Finale Ligure under the command of his cousin Pietro di Campofregoso. The Genoese assault led to the destruction of Castel Gavone and the burning of the city of Finalborgo which, shortly afterwards, surrendered to Genoa. The proceeds confiscated from the Marquisate of Finale, were transferred to the Bank of Saint George, also allowing the subsequent conquest of Castelfranco and the fief of Giustenice.

During his dogate, thanks to Pope Nicholas V, he also established excellent relations with the Papal States and in particular with the apostolic secretary Flavio Biondo. For Genoa he reinforced the city walls and rebuilt the fortress of Castelletto, that was previously demolished by the population in the clashes of 1436. He increased trade and traffic in threatened eastern colonies with new tax relief, after the beginning of the waning phase of the Byzantine Empire, by the Turks. Also in 1448 he foiled the conspiracies of Giovanni Antonio Fieschi, supported by the French king as an act of retaliation for the failed commitments of 1446, who was executed with the beheading. The other suspects Niccolò Giustiniani and Battista Giustiniani, perhaps financed by Alfonso V of Aragon, were sentenced to exile from Genoa. In July he purchased the lordship of Sarzana from his uncle Tomaso di Campofregoso for 10,000 ducats.

=== Death ===
Giano di Campofregoso fell ill in September 1448. With a serious illness, died on 16 December of the same year in Genoa despite the efforts and medical treatment provided to him. The funeral, celebrated with "great majesty", took place in the Cathedral of San Lorenzo by Pietro Pierleoni of Rimini. The body was buried in the church of San Francesco di Castelletto (later demolished) and with the inauguration of a marble monument in his honor.

== Personal life ==
From his first marriage with Violante di Brando, daughter of the noble Corso Francesco di Brando, he had four children: Tommasino, who was lord of Sarzana and governor of Corsica, Leonarda, Battistina and Tommasina. From the second marriage with Drusiana Sforza he had no issue.

== See also ==
- Republic of Genoa
- Doge of Genoa
- Genoese colonies
- Genoese Navy
- Fregoso
