= Siege of Genoa (1522) =

- Part of the Italian War of 1521–1526
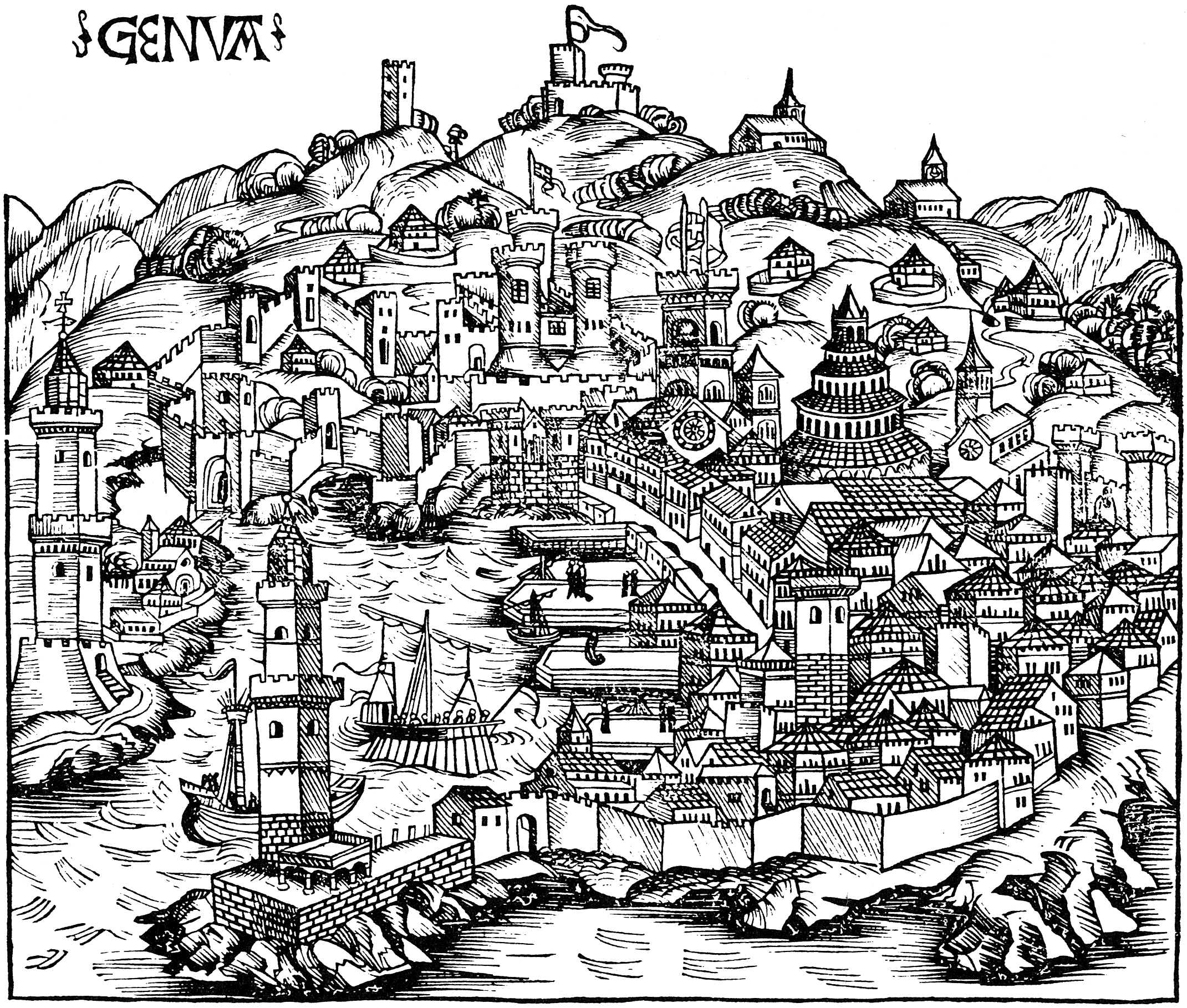
- View of Genoa around 1490.
Date	20–30 May 1522
Location	Genoa, Republic of Genoa 44°24′40″N 8°55′58″E
Result	Imperial victory: Antoniotto II Adorno installed as new Doge

Belligerents
Holy Roman Empire; Spain	Kingdom of France

Commanders and leaders
(Spain) Prospero Colonna (Spain) Fernando d'Ávalos; Antoniotto II Adorno	Pedro Navarro; Ottaviano Fregoso; Andrea Doria

Strength
20,000 men	6,200 men

Casualties and losses
Unknown	300-1,000 killed many prisoners

The Siege of Genoa (1522) took place in May 1522 as part of a larger conflict known as the Italian War of 1521–1526.
Between 20 and 30 May 1522, the city of Genoa, defended by a French garrison, was besieged by imperial troops commanded by condottieri Prospero Colonna and Fernando Francesco d'Avalos. The siege ended with an Imperial victory, and since the city had not surrendered but rather been taken by assault, the Imperial troops were allowed to sack the city after its conquest..

== Background ==
After the French defeat in the Battle of Bicocca on 27 April, the remainder of the French forces under command of Odet de Foix began to retreat across the Alps to France..
On 14 May, Prospero Colonna reached an agreement with the French captains of Cremona for the surrender of the city. He then moved with the army towards Novara, still occupied by the French, having received news that a new French army composed of 8,000 infantry, 200 heavy cavalry and 20 pieces of artillery had crossed the Alps and was near Saluzzo. During the march he sent d'Avalos with the Spanish infantry towards Genoa, in order to make the city rise up against Ottaviano Fregoso, the Doge allied with the French.

== Siege ==
On 20 May, d'Avalos reached Genoa, established two camps, and began bombarding the city with artillery, concentrating his fire especially near the Lighthouse of Genoa. Fregoso, suspecting a plot by the Adorno's to surrender the city to the Spanish, had them expelled. The Spanish soon opened negotiations for surrender, demanding 150,000 ducats from Fregoso to save the city from sacking, but the proposal was rejected.

On 30 May, around sunset, Spanish infantry and Landsknechts simultaneously attacked the city from the west and the east. After two failed attempts, on the third, the infantrymen placed ladders on the walls near Porta San Tommaso and Porta dell'Arco, and within half an hour, over a thousand men managed to enter the city, after which the sacking began.
An hour after the entry of the imperial troops, Doge Ottaviano Fregoso and Pietro Navarro surrendered to d'Avalos and Gerolamo Adorno. Francesco II Sforza and Prospero Colonna then entered the city, and by the former's will, many monasteries and several noble palaces were saved from sacking, including those of the Adorno's and Fieschi's.

The French fleet escaped from the port of Genoa, taking refuge in Savona. Conversely, Genoese admiral Andrea Doria tried to enter the port with four galleys to fight off the sacking, but was forced to retreat when the invaders turned the port's artillery against his fleet and bombarded it. He escaped to Monaco.

== Consequences ==
Antoniotto II Adorno was elected the city's new Doge, replacing Ottaviano Fregoso. The imperial army broke camp and headed toward Tortona, aiming to counter the new French army that had meanwhile reached Turin. Sforza gave the Genoese the opportunity to buy back part of the booty gained from the sack of the city, which was estimated to amount to approximately 200,000 ducats.
