= Ottaviano Fregoso =

Doge of Genoa (1470–1524)

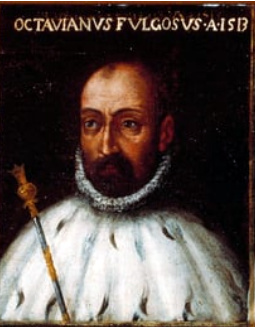

44th Lifetime Doge of the Republic of Genoa
- In office 20 June 1513 – 7 September 1515
- Preceded by: Giano II di Campofregoso
- Succeeded by: Antoniotto II Adorno

Personal details
- Born: 1470 Genoa, Republic of Genoa
- Died: 1524 (aged 53–54) Ischia, Kingdom of Naples

Ottaviano Fregoso (born in Genoa, 1470 - died in Ischia, 1524) was the Doge of the Republic of Genoa.

== Biography ==
Ottaviano Fregoso, was the son of Agostino Fregoso and Gentile di Montefeltro, daughter of the renowned condottiero, patron of humanists, and book collector, Federico da Montefeltro, Duke of Urbino. Ottaviano was born in Genoa, but, like his brother, the future cardinal, Federigo, spent much of his youth at the court of Urbino, presided over by their uncle, Guidobaldo da Montefeltro. There the brothers received a classical humanistic education and were the companions and close friends of such humanists as Pietro Bembo and Baldassare Castiglione and the painter Raphael. Ottaviano and Federigo Fregoso are participants in the fictional discussion presided over by Elisabetta Gonzaga, Duchess of Urbino, in Baldassare Castiglione's The Book of the Courtier, which was supposed to have taken place at the court of Urbino in 1507. In the dialog, both brothers, who themselves (like the other interlocutors in the discussion), are supposed to embody the Italian Renaissance ideal of courtly behavior in an ideal court, are depicted as defending a republican form of government.

Beginning in 1497, Ottaviano participated in an alliance with King Charles VII of France, in order to expel the Sforza family from Genoa. In the early 1500s, he also defended his uncle's duchy of Urbino against Cesare Borgia, known as Valentino, the son of Pope Alexander VI. In the course of this war, Guidobaldo da Montefeltro, was forced to destroy several fortresses rather than cede them to the enemy.

In 1506 Guidobaldo conferred on Ottaviano the lordship of Sant'Agata Feltria, which was confirmed in 1513 by Pope Leo X.

Also in 1506, Ottaviano was sent to Bologna to recover for the Papal States the cities that had fallen into the hands of Giovanni Bentivoglio.

Subsequently, Ottaviano returned to Genoa, where he and his cousin, Giano II Campofregoso, attempted to expel their former allies, the French. At that time the Fregoso (Guelph) and the Adorno (Ghibelline) families were engaged in a violent struggle for the supremacy of the city. These clashes culminated in 1510 with the victory of Adornos: the Fregoso faction was forced again into exile and again took refuge in Urbino.

Three years later, the Fregosos turned the tables and defeated the Adornos, returning to Genoa, where in June 1513 Ottaviano became Doge. During his government he initiated important public works such as the modernization of the port of Genoa and the construction of the tower of the Cathedral of San Lorenzo.

For its times, Ottaviano's government displayed notable magnanimity towards its opponents, both those within his family, as with his cousin (and former ally against the French), Giano II Campofregoso, who plotted to take Ottaviano's place as Doge, and toward members of such traditionally hostile families as the Adorno and the Fieschi.

After the Battle of Marignano in 1515, Ottaviano Fregoso was forced to acknowledge King Francis I of France, as his overlord; Francis, however, allowed Ottaviano to remain on as ruler of Genoa.

In 1520 Pope Leo X conferred on him the title of Count.

When Spanish troops under Emperor Charles V sacked and occupied Genoa in 1522, Ottaviano was captured and imprisoned, first at Naples, then at Aversa, and then in the fortress of Ischia, where he died in 1524, according to some authors, by poisoning. After his death, the fief of S. Agatha was ruled, first by his brother, Cardinal Federigo Fregoso and then by his son Aurelio.

To this day, descendants of Ottaviano Fregoso are noted to reside in the United States, with the majority of them residing in the states of; CA, VA, NY, NV, and FL, with the majority of them residing in CA, VA and NY. Descendants noted; Immediate; Antonasio Fregoso, Robert Fregoso, Deborah Fregoso, Cynthia Fregoso, Bobby Fregoso, Charlotte Fregoso, Sean Fregoso, Elizabeth Fregoso, Skylar Fregoso, Jordan Fregoso, and Garrett Fregoso.

As of this writing, Bobby Fregoso remains active within the Genovese crime family and currently resides in Florida

== Assessments ==
Contemporary historians and intellectuals remembered Ottaviano as a liberal and magnanimous prince, holding him up as a quintessential Renaissance gentleman and a pattern for rulers, as did Baldassare Castiglione who made him one of the interlocutors in The Book of the Courtier (1528). Francesco Guicciardini, in his History of Italy (1561) records him as "certainly a prince of most excellent virtue, notable for his justice and other noble qualities, and as beloved in Genoa as any ruler could be in that city of factions, where the memory of their ancient liberties was not entirely extinguished in the minds of the citizenry."
