= Federigo Fregoso =

Italian nobleman, prelate and general

- Cardinal-Priest of Santi Giovanni e Paolo
- Church: Catholic Church
- In office: 4 February 1541 – 22 July 1541
- Predecessor: Pedro Fernández Manrique
- Successor: Pierre de La Baume
- Other post: (Arch)Bishop of Gubbio (1508-1541)
- Previous posts: Archbishop of Salerno (1507-1529) (Arch)Bishop of Coutances (1521-1525)

Orders
- Created cardinal: 19 December 1539 by Pope Paul III

Personal details
- Born: c. 1480 Genoa, Republic of Genoa
- Died: 22 July 1541 (aged 60–61) Gubbio, Duchy of Urbino

Federigo Fregoso (c. 1480, Genoa – 22 July 1541), was an Italian nobleman, prelate and general.

== Early life and family ==
Fregoso was born to the Fregoso family, a family who in the late fourteenth century gave two Doges of Genoa to the Republic of Genoa. Federigo was the son of Agostino Fregoso, governor of Genoa in 1488 for Ludovico il Moro, and of Gentilla de Montefeltro, niece of Guidobaldo, Duke of Urbino. His brother, Ottaviano Fregoso, was Doge of Genoa.

Fregoso spent his youth at the court of his uncle, the Duke of Urbino, and after taking Catholic orders, received in 1507 from Pope Julius II the Archbishopric of Salerno. Ferdinand II of Aragon having refused to recognize him because of his sympathies with France, the Pope promised him the See of Gubbio. At the court of Urbino, Federigo had received a good classical education, and had allied himself with such humanists as Pietro Bembo and Baldassarre Castiglione.

== Military career ==
In 1510, after the troubles in Genoa and the victory of the Adorno family, he was exiled and compelled to seek refuge in Rome. Three years later, the Fregosi family returned to Genoa, Ottaviano became Doge, and after having become his chief counsellor, Fregoso was placed at the head of the army, and defended the Genoan republic against such internal dangers as the revolts of the Adorni and the Fieschi) as well as suppressing the Barbary piracy.

The corsair Kurtoğlu Muslihiddin Reis blockaded the coast with a squadron, and within a few days had captured eighteen merchantmen. Being given the command of the Genoese fleet, in which Andrea Doria was serving, Fregoso surprised Kurtoğlu before Bizerta, landed on the island of Djerba and returned to Genoa with treasure.

The Fregosi family had recognized Francis I of France, as Lord of Genoa. In 1522, Charles V besieged the city. Federigo Fregoso directed the defence and was wounded. The Spanish took Genoa by assault, and Fregoso was compelled to seek safety on a French vessel. Francis I accorded him a warm reception and gave him the Abbey of St. Benignus at Dijon. Here he studied Greek and Hebrew, but after quarrels with the monks, who could not endure his severity, he returned to Italy.

== Elevation in Catholic hierarchy ==
In 1529 he resigned the See of Salerno and was named titular Bishop of Gubbio. In 1539 Pope Paul III made him a cardinal-priest. He died at Gubbio, in 1541. He wrote several edifying works, and some of his letters are in the collections of Pietro Bembo and Baldassare Castiglione.
