= Antoniotto Adorno =

Antoniotto Adorno may refer to the following:

- Antoniotto I Adorno (1340–1398), Doge of the Republic of Genoa (1378, 1384–1390, 1391–1392, 1394–1396)
- Antoniotto II Adorno (c. 1479–1528), Doge of the Republic of Genoa (1522–1527)
- Antoniotto Botta Adorno (1688–1774), high officer of the Habsburg Monarchy and a plenipotentiary of the Austrian Netherlands
