= Kastro tis Orias (ballad) =

The Kastro tis Orias (Greek: Κάστρο της Ωριάς, "Castle of the Fair Maiden") or Kastro tis Marous (Κάστρο της Μαρούς, "Castle of Maria") is a Greek ballad about a fair maiden who fell from the battlements of her castle to her death when it was taken by an enemy, typically Saracens or Ottomans. In many versions, it has been known throughout the Greek world since the Middle Ages. The name has been applied to many fortifications across the Greek world (cf. Kastro tis Orias).

The ballad may originally have been based on the Sack of Amorium (838); the characteristics of the citadel of Amorium (near modern Emirdağ, Turkey) seem to be mentioned, especially in the version called "To Kastro tis Marous".

== Plot ==
A castle is besieged for many years. One of the besiegers, whose mother is Greek, disguises himself as a pregnant Greek woman who wants to give birth or as a monk who wants to take refuge. The lady of the castle (the "fair maiden") takes pity and orders the gate to be opened. The besiegers pour in and the trickster chases after her as his prize, but she throws herself off the ramparts and dies.
