= Antoniotto II Adorno =

Doge of Genoa

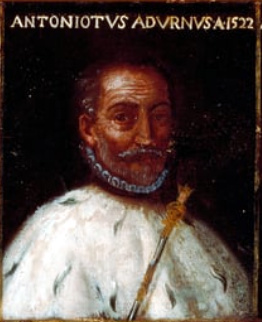

45th Lifetime Doge of the Republic of Genoa
- In office 31 May 1522 – August 1527
- Preceded by: Dogeship vacant
- Succeeded by: Dogeship vacant

Personal details
- Born: 1479 Genoa, Republic of Genoa
- Died: 12 September 1528 Milan, Duchy of Milan

Antoniotto II Adorno (c. 1479 – 12 September 1528) was Doge of the Republic of Genoa from 1522 to 1527. Adorno was the last of the Genoese doges elected for life.

== Biography ==
A member of the patrician Adorno family, considered one of the most influential in the history of the republic, Antoniotto is particularly remembered for having sent the members of the Fregoso family out of Genoa.

An enemy of Doge Giano II di Campofregoso, in 1512 he allied with King Louis XII of France in the course of the Italian Wars between France and Spain, and attacked Genoa. The defeat suffered by the French at Novara forced him to take refuge in Milan. Antoniotto tried two further attacks against Genoa in 1513 and 1514, both without success.

When the new doge, Ottaviano di Campofregoso, allied with Francis I of France during the French occupation of Lombardy in September 1515, Antoniotto switched to the Spanish party. The Spanish victory at the Battle of Bicocca (1522) and the subsequent Conquest of Genoa, granted him the position of doge. In the same year he had the port of Savona destroyed in retaliation for their rebellion against the Republic of Genoa. He held the title, with little popular support, for five years until, attacked by the French general Odet de Foix and by Andrea Doria, he left Genoa.

He retired to Milan, where he died in 1528.

== Popular culture ==
He is a character in the opera Die Gezeichneten (first performed in 1918) by Austrian composer Franz Schreker.

== Sources ==
- "Adorno, Antoniotto II". Enciclopedia Biografica Universale. Enciclopedia Treccani.
