= Giorgio Adorno =

Doge of Genoa from 1413 to 1415

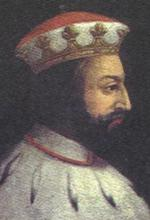

17th Lifetime Doge of the Republic of Genoa
- In office 27 March 1413 – 23 March 1415
- Preceded by: Position vacant
- Succeeded by: Barnaba Guano

Personal details
- Born: 1350 Genoa, Republic of Genoa
- Died: 1430 (aged 79–80)

Giorgio Adorno (Genoa, c. 1350 – 1430) was a statesman who became doge of the Republic of Genoa for two years. He was the brother of Antoniotto I Adorno, who was elected four times as doge of the Republic. Little is known about his youth except that he married Pietrina Montaldo, daughter of the doge Leonardo Montaldo. With her, he had nine children, including the future doge Raffaele Adorno.

== Mandate ==
In 1396, the Republic of Genoa had joined the French kingdom but regained its independence on 21 March 1413. The short-lived government of the eight rectors rapidly gave way, and Giorgio was elected doge less than a week later. On the diplomatic scene, Giorgio managed to regain some of the territories that had been given away by the French governor during the occupation. In particular, the Republic bought back numerous castles and villages from the Marquesse of Monferat and the Republic of Florence and regained control of the lower Piedmont and the Riviera.

An important step in the effort to stabilize the Republic was the promulgation of the new constitution. The main points of the new regime were the greater influence granted to the doge in the system, and the official allegiance to the Ghibelline faction. In case of vacancy of the dogeship, the sovereignty of the Republic was to pass to the council of the Twelve Ancients.

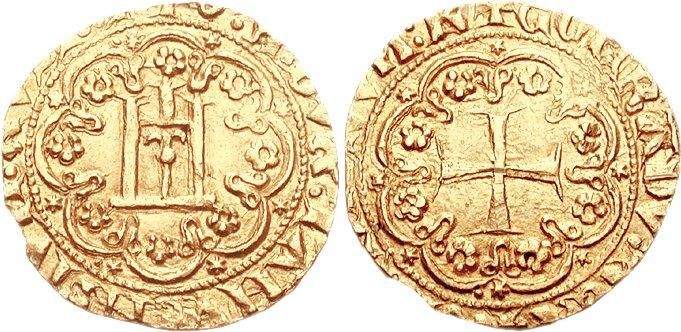
Genovino minted during the mandate of Giorgio Adorno.

== Civil war ==
Noble families had been locked in a series of conflicts for several decades. The crisis came to a head when Isnardo Guarco organized a revolt in the newly reconquered territories near Tuscany, but the rebellion was quickly suppressed. In December 1414, Battista Montaldo led a strong Guelph faction constituted of the Spinola, Vivaldi, Grilli, Negroni, Da Mare and Imperiali families against the Ghibelline families (Fregoso, Giustiniani, Promontorio, Soprani) who supported the Adorno dogeship. Street battles and homicides unfolded despite the calls for peace by the Archbishop. Noble families that owned large tracts of land along the Rivieras as well as the Apennines and the Oltregiogo (e.g. Fieschi and Doria), took part in the street riots according to their own interests. Even the communities in these regions participated in the conflict, siding with factions such as the Doria-Campofregoso and Spinola-Adorno in Savona. Finally, in the early months of 1415 a truce was reached but to avoid being ousted, the doge demanded help from the Duke of Milan who sent 300 soldiers. In retaliation, the Guelph faction asked for help from the Marquesse of Monferrat.

Faced with the collapse of the city, Barnaba di Guano, Giacomo Giustiniani and Antonio Doria gathered in the cathedral of Saint Lawrence and called for the end of the conflict. Finally, they managed to convince Giorgio to renounce the dogeship. He resigned on March 1415. The rule of the Republic was left to the Government of the Two Priors, Tommaso di Campofregoso and Jacopo Giustiniani. Once ousted, Giorgio Adorno obtained the governorship of Caffa and a yearly stipend of 300 ducats.
