= Spinetta Fregoso =

Doge of the Republic of Genoa

35th Lifetime Doge of the Republic of Genoa
- In office 18 July 1461 – 24 July 1461
- Preceded by: Prospero Adorno
- Succeeded by: Lodovico di Campofregoso

Personal details
- Born: 1400 Genoa, Republic of Genoa
- Died: 1467 (aged 66–67) Gavi, Duchy of Milan

Spinetta Fregoso (1400 in Genoa – 1467 in Gavi) was the 35th Doge of the Republic of Genoa.

== Biography ==
Son of Spinetta I Fregoso and Benedetta Doria, and grandson of the former Doge Pietro Fregoso, he was born in the Genoese capital in a period around 1400. Despite the fact that his father exercised the role of podestà of Pera and then later as consul in Caffa, on behalf of the Republic of Genoa, Spinetta Fregoso spent his childhood and part of his adolescence in Genoa.

The escape of the doge Prospero Adorno on 17 July 1461 led to the rise of the Fregoso as new successor of the dogal power, he appoints that of 18 July, the thirty-fifth in the history of republican Genoa, favored by the consent of the Genoese archbishop Paolo di Campofregoso. But the events that followed, among them the armed reaction of the cousin Lodovico Fregoso, soon forced the doge Spinetta to surrender and to renounce the dogate a few days later, in favor of Lodovico himself. In exchange he received the dogal investiture on the vicariate of La Spezia and Levanto.

== See also ==
- Republic of Genoa
- Doge of Genoa
- Fregoso
