= Kastro tis Orias =

Kastro tis Orias (Greek: Κάστρο της Ωριάς/Οριάς, "Castle of the Fair Maiden") may refer to:

- Kastro tis Orias (ballad), a Byzantine ballad and folk story, probably based on the Sack of Amorium.

Various medieval fortresses named for the legend:

== Greece ==
- Gardiki Castle, Arcadia
- Kastro tis Orias, Cephalonia
- Kastro tis Orias, Chios
- Kastro tis Orias, Kilkis
- Kastro tis Orias, Kythnos
- Kastro tis Orias, Lemnos
- Kastro tis Orias, Mani, Laconia
- Kastro tis Orias, Servia
- Kastro tis Orias, Tempe
- Kastro tis Orias, Thasos
- Kalavryta Castle, Messenia
- Ochia Castle, Elis
- Platamon Castle, Pieria
- Salmeniko Castle, Achaea
- Salona Castle, Phocis
- Siderokastron, Phthiotis

== Turkey ==
- Demre Castle, (Lycia) Antalya Province
- Görele Castle, (Pontus) Giresun Province

== Albania ==
- Terihati castle (Northern Epirus), Gjirokastër county
- Palaiokastron castle (near Labova e Kryqit) (Northern Epirus), Gjirokastër county
