= Prospero Adorno =

Doge of the Republic of Genoa

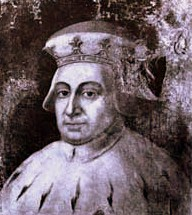

34th Lifetime Doge of the Republic of Genoa
- In office 12 March 1461 – 17 July 1461
- Preceded by: Dogeship vacant
- Succeeded by: Spinetta Fregoso

Personal details
- Born: 1428 Genoa, Republic of Genoa
- Died: 1485 (aged 56–57) Asti

Prospero Adorno (1428 in Genoa – 1485 in Asti) was the 34th Doge of the Republic of Genoa. Between 1477 and 1478 he was appointed Genoese governor for Gian Galeazzo Maria Sforza, after the submission of the Republic to the House of Sforza, Dukes of Milan.

== Biography ==
Son of Barnaba Adorno and Brigida Giustiniani, he was born in Genoa around 1428. An exponent of the Genoese Adorno family, considered the most influential in the history of the republic, he came to an agreement with Francesco I Sforza and the archbishop of Genoa Paolo Fregoso, future doge, to bring down the dedication of the Republic of Genoa towards the lordship of Charles VII of France who had been dominating the republican scene since 1458. From 9 March to 12 March 1461, Prospero Adorno himself was elected doge of Genoa.

During his dogate, the thirty-fourth in Genoese history, he soon came to the clash with the archbishop Fregoso, the latter eager for the promised cardinal title, due to the Adorno's friendship with Pope Pius II, to which was added a new increase in tense relations between Genoa and Savona. In May 1461 Carlo Adorno, Prospero's brother, attempted a siege on the Savonese city, that was ally of France and seat of the Genoese exiles opposed to the politics of the dogato, which had a bankruptcy outcome.

The sudden arrival of René of Anjou in Genoa forced a strange and rapid alliance between Adorno and the archbishop Fregoso who, also thanks to a hesitation of the opponent, was decisive in the battle of 17 July 1461 at Sampierdarena. Despite the joint victory, the triumphal entry into the republican capital was denied to the prelate who, indignant and strong of naval support by Bartolomeo Doria, did not delay in waging war on the fleet of Carlo Adorno who was defeated. The heavy loss necessarily forced his brother Prospero to leave the dogal power and therefore to flee from Genoa in July 1461.

He found refuge in the Sforza court in Milan, where he placed himself at the service of the lordship. He tried to insert himself in the diplomatic game that saw the Sforza family buying Savona in December 1463, and Genoa itself in 1464 which thus saw a first dedication to the Milanese lordship. In this historical phase Prospero Adorno withdrew from the political scene to manage the various fiefdoms received, some also in Calabria, from Duke Francesco Sforza. Under the lordship of Gian Galeazzo Maria Sforza, from April 1477, Prospero Adorno was governor of Genoa on behalf of the Milanese lordship.

== See also ==
- Republic of Genoa
- Doge of Genoa
- Adorno family
