= Paolo di Campofregoso =

Italian cardinal

His Eminence Paolo di Campofregoso
- Cardinal, Archbishop of Genoa
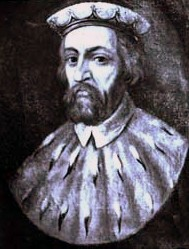
- Paolo di Campofregoso, Cardinal and Doge of Genoa
- Church: Catholic
- Archdiocese: Genoa
- See: Genoa
- Appointed: 1453
- Installed: 1453
- Term ended: 1498
- Predecessor: Giacomo Imperiale, O.S.B
- Successor: Giovanni Maria Sforza
- Other posts: Cardinal-Priest of Sant'Anastasia (1480-1489); Cardinal-Priest of San Sisto (1490-1498); Bishop of Ajaccio, Republic of Genoa (1493-1498)

Orders
- Ordination: unknown
- Consecration: 7 February 1453 by Pope Nicholas V
- Created cardinal: 1480 by Pope Sixtus IV
- Rank: Cardinal-Priest

Personal details
- Born: Paolo di Campofregoso; 1427 Genoa, Republic of Genoa
- Died: 22 March 1498 (aged 70–71) Rome, Papal States
- Parents: Lodovico di Campofregoso, Doge of Genoa
- Coat of arms: Paolo di Campofregoso's coat of arms

Paolo di Campofregoso
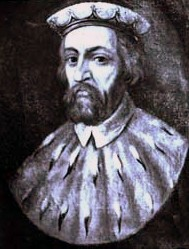

37th Lifetime Doge of the Republic of Genoa
- In office 14 May 1462 – 31 May 1462
- Preceded by: Lodovico di Campofregoso
- Succeeded by: Lodovico di Campofregoso
- In office 8 January 1463 – 16 April 1464
- Preceded by: Lodovico di Campofregoso
- Succeeded by: Dogeship vacant
- In office 25 November 1483 – 6 January 1488
- Preceded by: Battista Fregoso
- Succeeded by: Dogeship vacant

Personal details
- Born: 1427 Genoa, Republic of Genoa
- Died: 22 March 1498 (aged 70–71) Rome, Papal States

Paolo di Campofregoso (Genoa, 1427 – Rome, 22 March 1498) was a Genoese aristocrat and Italian Cardinal who was three times Doge of the Republic of Genoa, Roman Catholic Archbishop of Genoa from 1453 to 1498 and Bishop of Ajaccio from 1493 to 1498.

== Biography ==
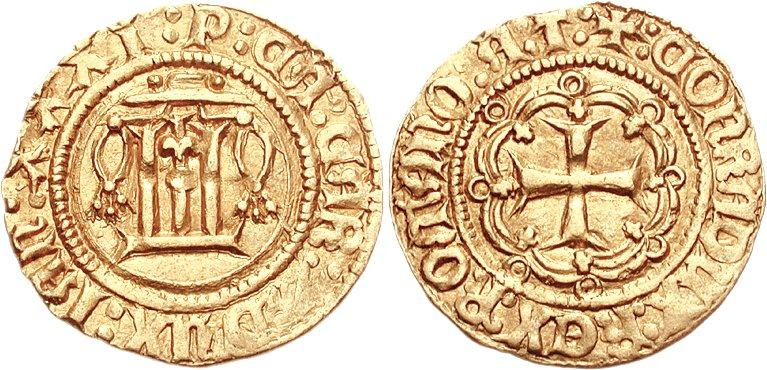
Ducat of Paolo di Campofregoso, coined between 1483 and 1488.

The son of doge Battista Fregoso, Paolo was convinced by Pope Nicholas V to study ecclesiastical matters at Pavia. In 1448, once finished with his studies, he was appointed canon of the cathedral of Savona, and in 1453 he became abbot of the Cistercian convent of Sant'Andrea at Savona. The same year, aged only 26, he was appointed archbishop of Genoa by request of his brother Pietro, the current doge. Pietro had become doge for the first time in 1450, succeeding his cousin Lodovico, who had resigned for unknown reasons. His rule ended in 1458 when the city surrendered itself to King Charles VII of France.

Further strife with his cousin caused Lodovico di Campofregoso to cede the title of doge to Paolo on 14 May 1462. His rule ended after just fifteen days, as he was replaced by five captains. The latter, in turn, lasted for only a week, after which Lodovico was restored as doge: now the hate between Paolo, the city's archbishop, and Lodovico, the city's political chief, reached its apex. Paolo succeeded him as doge in January 1463 and had Lodovico detained in the castle of Castelletto. The following year, after a series of questionable deeds (such as menacing the expulsion of the Adorno family from Genoa, and the endless strife within the Fregoso family), the Council of the Elders deposed him, accepting the protection of the House of Sforza, which lasted until 1477.

== Life as cardinal ==
In 1480 Paolo was created cardinal by Pope Sixtus IV in Rome. In that year he participated as papal admiral for an expedition alongside the Neapolitan fleet of Ferdinand I against the Turks at Otranto. In 1483 Paolo di Campofregoso was elected as doge of Genoa for the third time; however, this time a popular rebellion forced him to flee his city in 1488, being succeeded by another submission to the Sforzas. He subsequently lived in exile in Piedmont, Veneto and Rome. In 1490 he received the cardinal title of San Sisto, and took part in the conclave of 1492.

== Later years ==
In 1495 Paolo resigned from archbishopric of Genoa, but the following year he was appointed to that post again. In his late life he participated in the struggle to expel Charles VIII of France from Genoa.

== See also ==
- Republic of Genoa
- Doge of Genoa
- Genoa

== Sources ==
- Beneš, Carrie E. (2018). "Civic Identity". In Beneš, Carrie E. (ed.). A Companion to Medieval Genoa. Brill. pp. 193–218. ISBN 9789004360617.
- Epstein, Steven A. (1996). Genoa and the Genoese, 958-1528. University of North Carolina Press. ISBN 9780807849927.
- Salonen, Kirsi (2016). Papal Justice in the Late Middle Ages: The Sacra Romana Rota. Taylor & Francis. ISBN 9781317084280.

Political offices
Preceded by Lodovico di Campofregoso	Doge of Genoa; 14 May 1462 – 31 May 1462	Succeeded by Government of Four Captains
Preceded by Lodovico di Campofregoso	Doge of Genoa; 8 January 1463– April 1464	Succeeded by Subjection to Duchy of Milan
Preceded by Battista Fregoso	Doge of Genoa; 25 November 1483 – 6 January 1488	Succeeded by Subjection to Duchy of Milan
