= Graitzas Palaiologos =

Ottoman military commander

Konstantinos Graitzas Palaiologos (Greek: Κωνσταντίνος Γραίτζας Παλαιολόγος) was the commander of the Byzantine garrison at Castle Salmeniko near Patras during the invasion of the Despotate of Morea by the forces of Mehmed II of the Ottoman Empire in 1460–61.

Graitzas descended from an obscure part of the Palaiologos family, but showed more valor than his distant relatives, namely the siblings and co-ruling despotes Thomas Palaiologos and Demetrios Palaiologos. Whereas Thomas fled to Modon, Corfu, and finally to Rome as a refugee, his brother Demetrios surrendered outright to the Sultan. Meanwhile, Graitzas maintained his position, holding his redoubt until July 1461, nearly 8 years after the Conquest of Constantinople.

Mehmed the Conqueror commanded the attack personally. The elite Janissaries managed to subdue the town by severing its water supply. Its remaining residents (approximately 6000) were sold into slavery, with 900 children chosen to be drafted to the Devşirme. Graitzas and his garrison continued to hold out in the castle citadel. At this time, Gratizas agreed to surrender the castle to Mehmed in return for safe passage and immunity for his troops. After Mehmed's departure however, two successive subordinates disregarded the promise, arresting the first soldiers to leave the citadel and then renewing the siege. By mid July 1461, the Salmeniko citadel was isolated and surrounded and, as the last garrison of the Roman Empire, without hope of relief. Graitzas commanded a sortie of his remaining troops and escaped the besiegers. They sought refuge in the Venetian fortress of Lepanto (modern Naupactus).

With the Roman Empire he served having ceased to exist, Graitzas accepted a commission as a general in the armed forces of the Republic of Venice.

== Sources ==
- The Immortal Emperor (1992), by Donald Nicol, p. 113.
- The Fall of Constantinople 1453, by Steven Runciman.
- Prosopographisches Lexikon der Palaiologenzeit, IX no. 21497, ed. E. Trapp et als.
