= Pietro di Campofregoso =

Doge of the Republic of Genoa (1412–1459)

33rd Lifetime Doge of the Republic of Genoa
- In office September 8, 1450 – January 1458
- Preceded by: Lodovico di Campofregoso
- Succeeded by: Dogeship vacant

Personal details
- Born: 1412 Genoa, Republic of Genoa
- Died: September 14, 1459 (aged 46–47) Genoa, Republic of Genoa

Pietro Campofregoso (1417 – 14 September 1459) was Doge of Genoa from 1450 to 1458.

== Biography ==
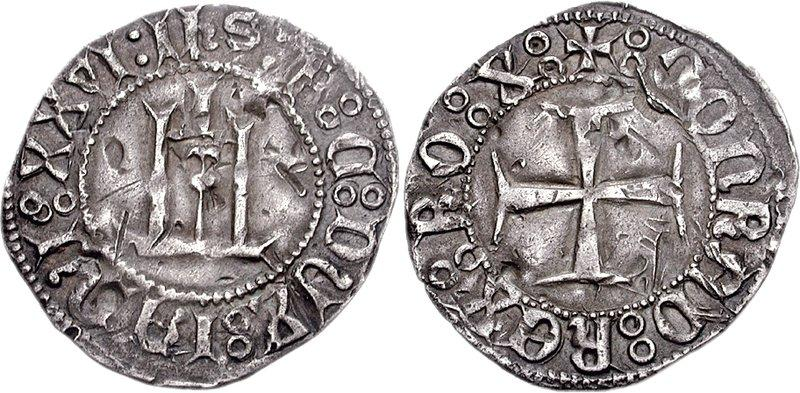
A grosso of Pietro di Campofregoso.

=== Family ===
He was a grandson of Tommaso di Campofregoso, he was a vassal of the Visconti as lord of Gavi. Married to Bartolomea Grimaldi, he had six sons, one of which, Battista Fregoso, was later also doge of Genoa.

=== Life as Doge ===
He was elected as doge on 8 September 1450, succeeding his cousin Lodovico di Campofregoso. His rule was one of the most disastrous for the eastern colonies of the Republic of Genoa. In this period Genoa lost Pera in Turkey, Caffa in Crimea and Chios in Greece, while the flourishing trade with those regions declined. In 1458, after turmoil with Turk and Aragonese soldiers, and with the Ghibelline faction in Genoa, Pietro asked King Charles VII of France for help. This however turned into an effective submission of Genoa to France, which lasted until 1461.

After a vain attempt at insurrection against the French, Pietro was stoned by the populace near the Porta Soprana on 14 September 1459. He was the first Grand Master of the Military Order of St. George.

== In popular media ==
Pietro di Campofregoso is played by Ali Ersin Yenar in 2012 film Fetih 1453. In the film, Pietro, not mentioned by name, orders Giovanni Giustiniani (Cengiz Coşkun) to command Genoese army to help Byzantine Empire preparing for war against the Ottoman Empire after an assault towards a Genoese freight by the Turks in the Bosphorus.

Preceded by Lodovico di Campofregoso	Doge of Genoa; 8 September 1450 – January 1458	Succeeded by Submission to Charles VII of France
