= Barnaba Guano =

Doge of the Republic of Genoa

18th Lifetime Doge of the Republic of Genoa
- In office 29 March 1415 – 3 July 1415
- Preceded by: Giorgio Adorno
- Succeeded by: Tomaso di Campofregoso

Personal details
- Born: 1370 Levanto, Republic of Genoa
- Died: 1454 (aged 83–84) Genoa, Republic of Genoa

Barnaba Guano (Levanto, 1370 — Genoa, 1454) was the 23rd Doge of the Republic of Genoa.

== Biography ==
Guano came to the power of the republic on 29 March 1415 after the brief jurisdiction of the government of the two priors, headed by Tomaso di Campofregoso, future doge, and Jacopo Giustiniani. For his election, the rules of the new Genoese republican constitution, launched during the Dogate of Giorgio Adorno, which after a special council of eight hundred men sanctioned the regular acclamation of Barnaba Guano as twenty-third doge of the Republic of Genoa, were applied.

According to some paper sources, his dogal appointment was certainly not surprising. In fact, he was one of the architects of the reconciliation between the noble families of Genoa during the civil war that shocked the republic between 1414 and 1415. In particular he was the one who, in a meeting with the population at the Cathedral of San Lorenzo, thanks to a wide speech, he loudly acclaimed peace and serenity among the inhabitants.

Already endowed according to some historians of a benevolent, calm and wise nature, he led the initial phases of his dogate with firm decisions and above all with the good advice of his predecessor Giorgio Adorno and Tomaso di Campofregoso.

== See also ==
- Doge of Genoa
- Republic of Genoa
