= Battista Fregoso (1380–1442) =

Doge of the Republic of Genoa

27th Lifetime Doge of the Republic of Genoa
- In office 24 March 1437 – 24 March 1437
- Preceded by: Tomaso di Campofregoso
- Succeeded by: Tomaso di Campofregoso

Personal details
- Born: 1380 Genoa, Republic of Genoa
- Died: 20 June 1442 (aged 61–62) Genoa, Republic of Genoa

Battista Fregoso (Genoa, 1380 – Genoa, 20 June 1442) was the 27th Doge of the Republic of Genoa. His leadership lasted only one day.

== Biography ==
Son of the former doge Pietro Fregoso and his second wife Benedetta Doria, brother of Tomaso di Campofregoso, who was elected to the dogal office three times, Battista was born in Genoa around 1380. After his father's death in 1404, Fregoso probably followed his own family in various exiles in different Italian states and in the management of commercial traffic, especially in the eastern Genoese colony of Cyprus.

Almost inexplicably, he began to approach the Milanese Duke Filippo Maria Visconti, enemy of his brother Tomaso, then the doge of the Republic. By now, secretly an ally of Duke Visconti, he put in place his "climb to power" on the morning of 24 March 1437, taking advantage of the momentary absence of the doge engaged in attending the religious celebrations of Palm Sunday at the Cathedral of San Lorenzo. Battista Fregoso took over the Doge's palace easily and in the same way he made himself a new doge of Genoa, all behind the "deposed" brother-doge. The dogate of Battista Fregoso, the twenty-seventh in Republican history, was very short, essentially a day, since on the same day it was in turn deposed by his brother Tomaso, who returned to the palace.

== See also ==
- Republic of Genoa
- Doge of Genoa
- Fregoso
