= Salmeniko Castle =

Castle in the Peloponnese

Coordinates: 38.2675°N 21.9389°E

The Salmeniko Castle (Greek: Κάστρο του Σαλμενίκου, Kastro tou Salmenikou) or Orgia or Oria Castle (Κάστρο Οργιάς/Ωριάς, cf. Kastro tis Orias) was a castle at the foot of Panachaiko mountain, in the modern municipality of Aigialeia, Achaea, Greece. In 1461 it was the last garrison of the Byzantine Empire, holding out until eight years after the fall of Constantinople in 1453.

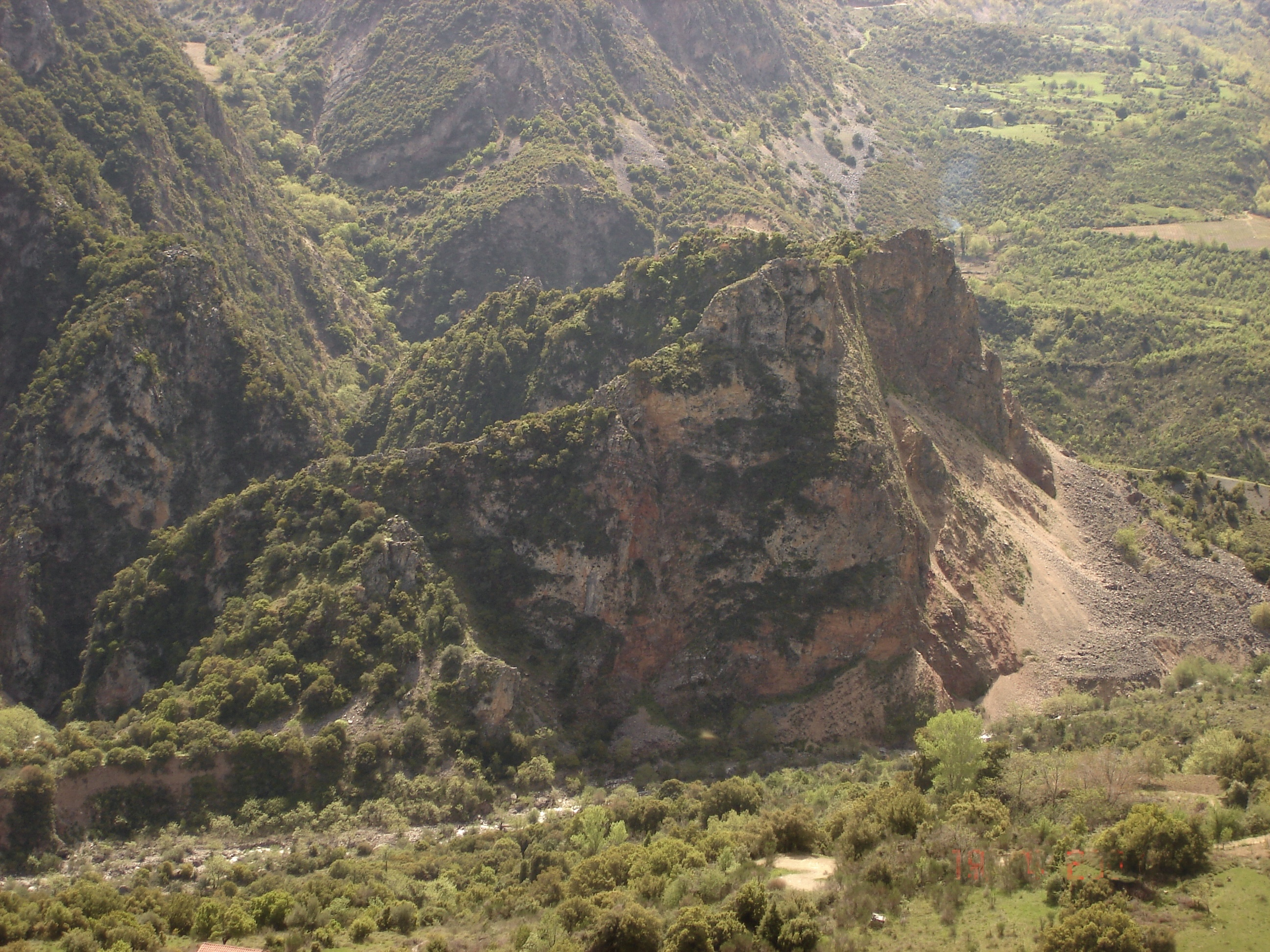
The mountain where the castle was built

== History ==
The castle was first built by local French barons of the Latin Principality of Achaea between 1280 and 1310. With the years, a large town developed around it. The site was naturally strong, at the top of a hill behind which the river Foinikas ran. Because of the steep cliffs there, no fortifications were required on that side.

In 1460, Ottoman Sultan Mehmed II invaded the Peloponnese, and the castles of the Byzantine Despotate of Morea submitted, one after another, often without resistance. Salmeniko was the last stronghold to offer resistance, under the command of Graitzas Palaiologos. The fortress resisted for a year, as the Ottoman siege guns were unable to destroy the walls. Only after the Janissaries managed to find and cut the fort's water supply line, did the town surrender. According to folk tradition, the residents threw sponges suspended from ropes from the castle, and thus collected water from the river below, until the Janissaries discovered it and started cutting the ropes. The town's inhabitants, 6,000 according to the historian Stefanos Thomopoulos, were enslaved, while 900 children were selected for the Devşirme.

Graitzas however and a number of defenders still held out in the citadel. As a condition for surrendering it, he demanded free passage of his men. Mehmed accepted and departed unmolested for Aigio, leaving a certain Hamouzas as governor of the Peloponnese and Thessaly, and to oversee Graitza's departure. Hamouzas disregarded the agreement, however, and arrested the first men who tried to leave the citadel. Informed of this, Mehmed replaced him with Zaganos Pasha and left the Peloponnese. However, Zaganos too renewed the siege of the citadel. Graitzas then attempted a sortie, and managed to break through and find refuge in the Venetian-held fortress of Lepanto. The fall of Salmeniko signalled the complete submission of the Peloponnese (with the exception of Venetian holdings like Nafplion, Methoni and Koroni) to the Ottomans.

Today, the castle and town lie in ruins, which are still visible on the site. A medieval bridge survives intact, while the "Oria rock" (Βράχος της Ωριάς), where, according to local tradition, a princess was killed by a traitor during the Ottoman siege, is nearby.

== Sources ==
- Kostas Triandafyllou, Historic Dictionary of Patras, 3rd edition, Patras 1995
- Alexios Panagopoulos, Historic Dictionary of the Municipality of Rio, Achaia Prefecture, Peri Technon, Patras 2003 ISBN 960-8260-32-9
- Stefanos Thomopoulos, History of the city of Patras, Patras 1999, Achaikes Publishers, Volume II
- (in Greek) Erineos Municipality
