= Giano II di Campofregoso =

Doge of Genoa (1455–1529)

43rd Lifetime Doge of the Republic of Genoa
- In office 29 June 1512 – 25 May 1513
- Preceded by: Dogeship vacant
- Succeeded by: Ottaviano Fregoso

Personal details
- Born: 1455 Genoa, Republic of Genoa
- Died: 10 August 1529 Brescia, Republic of Venice

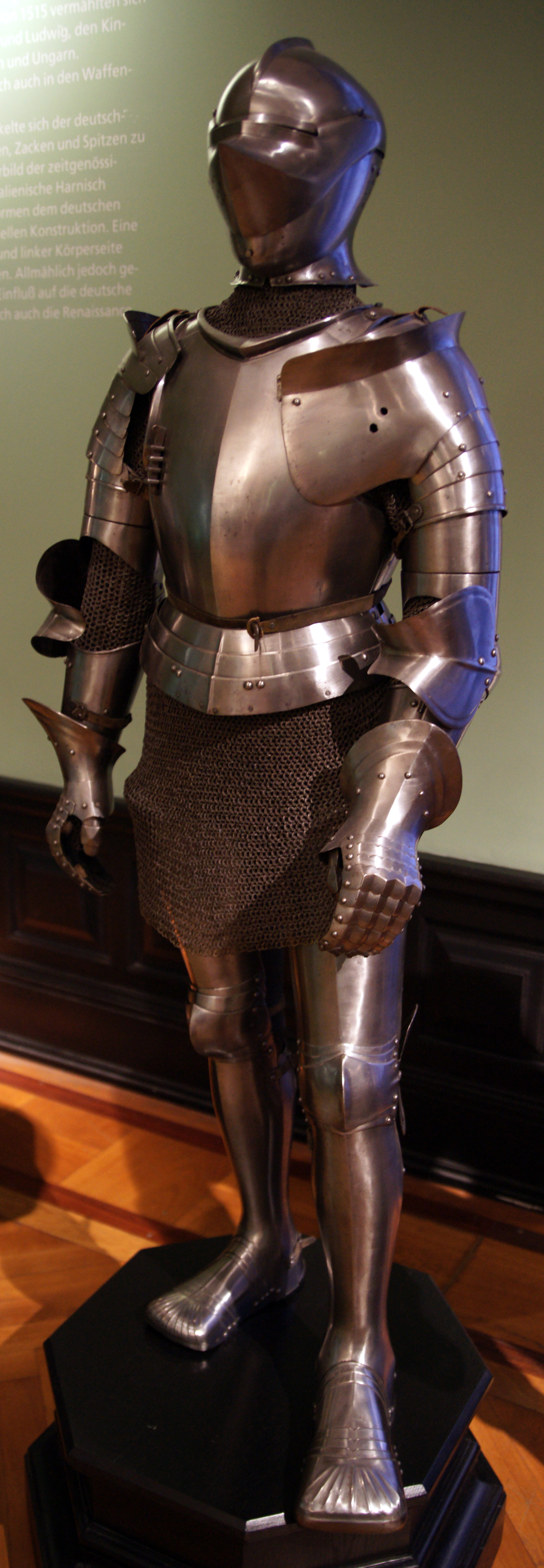
The armour of Giano II di Campofregoso, made c. 1510

Giano II di Campofregoso (1455–1529) was an Italian Condottiero and the 43rd Doge of Genoa, ruling from 29 June 1512 to 25 May 1513.

== Biography ==
The son of Tommasino Fregoso and Caterina Malaspina, he first trained in Corsica, then moved to Rome where he received a cavalry command by Pope Julius II. In 1506, together with his kinsman Ottaviano di Campofregoso, he led an army against Genoa but halted his march after he was reconciled with the nobles who had allied with France. Julius subsequently assigned him the command of Lunigiana. In 1512 he led another military expedition against Genoa, which he freed from the last French garrisons. This victory gained him the title of doge on 29 June that year.

His rule lasted for a year, after plots of the Fieschi and Adorno families led again the Republic towards the French King Louis XII. Giano left the city on a ship on 25 May 1513, serving the rival Republic of Venice as a land commander in the Italian Wars.

In the following years, he took part in the continuous Venetian military campaigns. In 1516 he defeated the army of emperor Maximilian I in the battle of Rocca d'Anfo near Brescia. In 1527, during the War of the League of Cognac against Charles V, he was appointed governor of the Venetian army. Despite the League's defeat, he achieved a victory over Imperial captain Count Guido Rangoni. After the dismissal of Francesco Maria I della Rovere, he was elected as supreme commander of the Holy League in his place. However, he held this highest office only for a short time: struck down by illness in the citadel of Brescia during military operations, he made his will on 10 August 1529, and died soon after.

He is buried in the church of Santa Anastasia in Verona.
