= Sant'Agata Feltria =

- Comune
- Comune di Sant'Agata Feltria
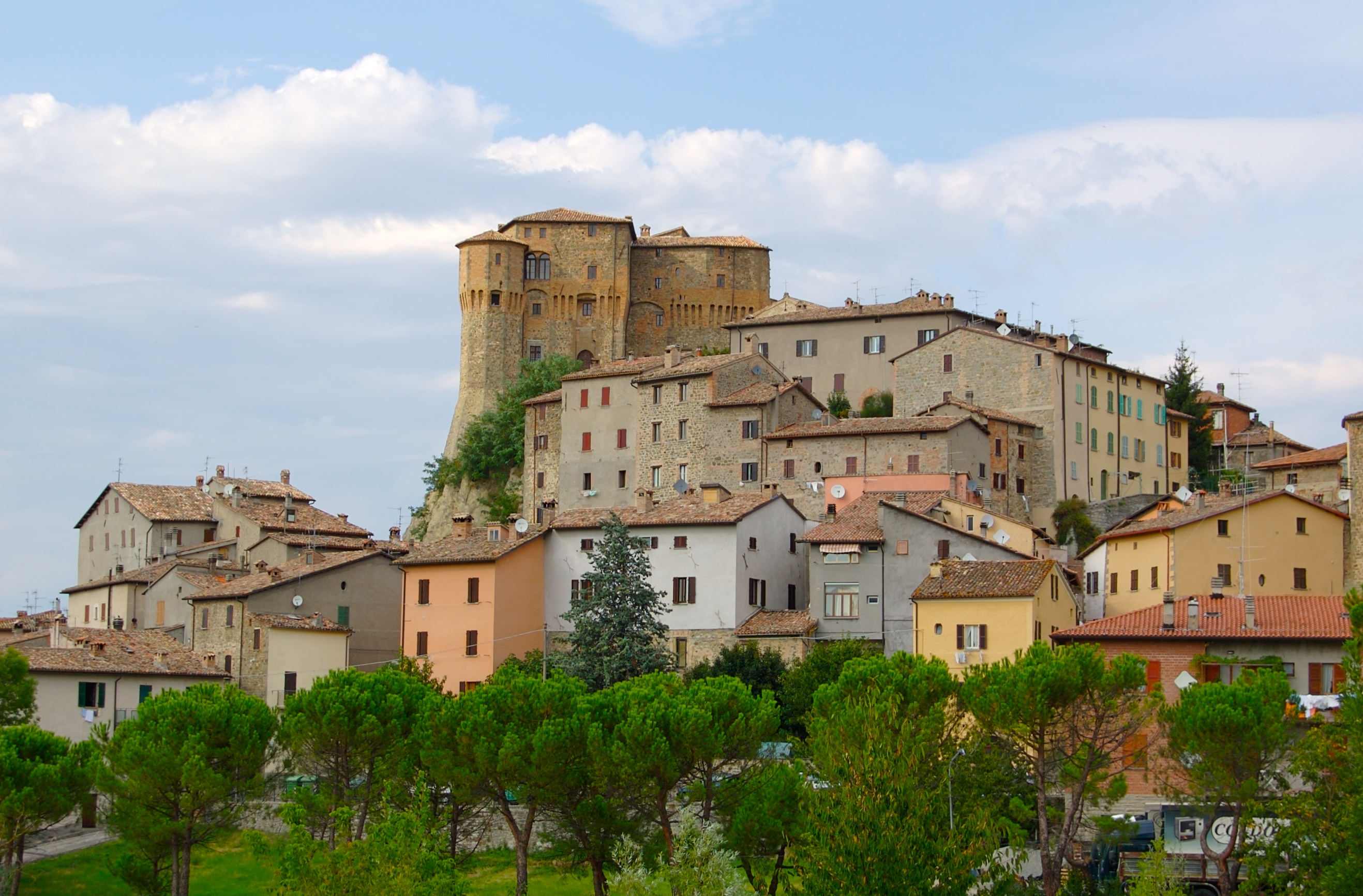

- Coat of arms

- Location within Italy Location within Emilia-Romagna
- Coordinates: 43°52′N 12°13′E
- Country: Italy
- Region: Emilia-Romagna
- Province: Rimini (RN)
- Frazioni: Botticella, Palazzo, Pereto, Petrella Guidi, Poggio Scavolo, Rivolpaio, Rocca Pratiffi, Romagnano, Rosciano, San Donato, Sapigno, Tramonto, Ugrigno

Government
  - Mayor: Goffredo Polidori

Area
  - Total: 79.2 km^{2} (30.6 sq mi)
- Elevation: 606 m (1,988 ft)

Population (31 December 2005)
  - Total: 2,349
  - Density: 29.7/km^{2} (76.8/sq mi)
- Demonym: Santagatesi
- Time zone: UTC+1 (CET)
  - Summer (DST): UTC+2 (CEST)
- Postal code: 47866
- Dialing code: 0541
- Patron saint: St. Agatha
- Saint day: February 5
- Website: Official website

Sant'Agata Feltria (Romagnol: Sant'Êgta) is a comune (municipality) in the Province of Rimini in the Italian region Emilia-Romagna, located about 125 kilometres (78 mi) southeast of Bologna and about 45 kilometres (28 mi) south of Rimini.

== Overview ==
It is home to a large fortress (Fortilizio), designed, among the others, by Francesco di Giorgio Martini

== History ==
Originally, the town belonged to the Church. Over time, it became a fiefdom controlled by prominent families like the Montefeltro, Malatesta, and Tarlati. Eventually, Cardinal Egidio Albornoz brought the territory back under the control of the Papal States.

The following period saw Sant'Agata Feltria under the authority of the rector of Massa Trabaria and then the Malatesta family, who held it from 1420 to 1463.

In 1420, Pope Pius II granted dominion of Sant'Agata Feltria to the Montefeltro family. This period also marked a significant historical and cultural connection with Genoa. Federico da Montefeltro, Duke of Urbino, solidified this link by marrying his daughter Gentile to Agostino Fregoso, son of the Genoese Doge Lodovico di Campofregoso, in 1470. As part of Gentile's dowry, Federico bestowed upon her the county of Sant'Agata Feltria. The son born from this union would later become Doge of Genoa. The Rocca Fregoso, a prominent fortress that is the symbol of the town, was commissioned in this period by Federico da Montefeltro. This fortress was designed by Francesco di Giorgio Martini.

The Fregoso family governed Sant'Agata Feltria until their lineage died out in 1660.

After the referendum of 17 and 18 December 2006, Sant'Agata Feltria was detached from the Province of Pesaro and Urbino (Marche) to join Emilia-Romagna and the Province of Rimini on 15 August 2009.
