= Isnardo Guarco =

Italian politician (1380–1458)

25th Lifetime Doge of the Republic of Genoa
- In office 28 March 1436 – 3 April 1436
- Preceded by: Dogeship vacant
- Succeeded by: Tomaso di Campofregoso

Personal details
- Born: 1380 Genoa, Republic of Genoa
- Died: 1458 (aged 77–78) Genoa, Republic of Genoa

Isnardo Guarco (Genoa, 1380 – Genoa, 1458) was an Italian politician, mercenary leader, plutocrat, and served as Doge of Genoa for one week.

== Bibliography ==
(IT) Sergio Buonadonna e Mario Mercenaro, Rosso doge. I dogi della Repubblica di Genova dal 1339 al 1797, 2ª ed., Zena, De Ferrari, 2018, ISBN 88-64-05998-9.

== See also ==
- Republic of Genoa
- Doge of Genoa
