= Battista Fregoso (1452–1504) =

Doge of the Republic of Genoa

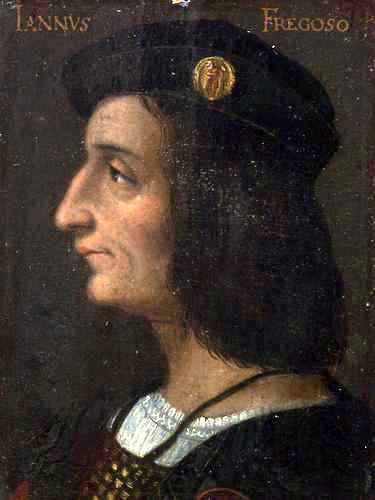

40th Lifetime Doge of the Republic of Genoa
- In office 26 November 1478 – 25 November 1483
- Preceded by: Dogeship vacant
- Succeeded by: Paolo di Campofregoso

Personal details
- Born: 1450 Genoa, Republic of Genoa
- Died: 1504 (aged 53–54) Rome, Papal States

Battista Fregoso (2 February 1452 – August 1504) was the 40th Doge of the Republic of Genoa.

== Biography ==
Son of the Doge Pietro Fregoso, and Bartolomea Grimaldi, daughter of Giovanni, lord of Monaco, Menton and Roccabruna, he was called Battistino, to distinguish him from his paternal grandfather. He spent part of his youth with his uncles, princes of Piombino. Educated by Raimondo Soncino, Fregoso approached humanistic studies with the exercise of arms. In adulthood, he also dedicated himself to writing books, of which the best known bears the Greek title of Anterote, published in Milan in 1496; Baptista Fulgosi Anteros also wrote in Vulgar Latin, with Latin notes.

From the court of Piombino, he moved to Novi Ligure, a fief granted by the Duke of Milan to his father in return for his military aid. In 1478, taking advantage of the turbulent situation of Genoa, torn by continuous threats of a civil war between the oligarchic factions, he left Novi with a good number of armed men and, having arrived in Genoa, he acquired with corruption the favor of Obietto Fieschi, with the help of the army of these, was able to forcefully dismiss the doge in charge Prospero Adorno. On 25 November 1478 he was awarded the Dogate which he kept for five years, until he was deposed by his own uncle, Cardinal Paolo Fregoso, who ruled the Dogate for the third time.

His uncle, the cardinal, also managed for some time to steal the fiefdom of Novi, in favor of his natural son Fregosino. Battista was forced to take refuge in France, officially to devote himself to the study of history and letters. Recalled at home by Paolo Fregoso's opponents, he did not manage to regain the title of doge, despite the fall of his uncle in 1488. Banned like all members of his family, he was forced to return to exile where he wrote the work Fatti and memorable sayings. Reinstated in his possessions by Ludovico Sforza, with whom he had ambiguous relations, negotiating between the Duke of Milan and the King of France, he never returned to his fiefdoms.

He spent the last days of his life in Rome where he had gone in the hope of receiving assistance from Pope Julius II. He died in 1504 and was buried in Genoa in the church of Sant'Agostino.

== Works ==
- Anteros. Milan: Leonard Pachel. 1496.

== See also ==
- Fregoso
