= Lodovico di Campofregoso =

Italian nobleman, Doge of Genoa

32nd Lifetime Doge of the Republic of Genoa
- In office 16 December 1447 – 4 September 1450
- Preceded by: Giano I di Campofregoso
- Succeeded by: Pietro di Campofregoso
- In office 25 July 1461 – 14 May 1462
- Preceded by: Spinetta Fregoso
- Succeeded by: Paolo di Campofregoso
- In office 8 June 1462 – January 1463
- Preceded by: Paolo di Campofregoso
- Succeeded by: Paolo di Campofregoso

Personal details
- Born: 1415 Genoa, Republic of Genoa
- Died: 1489 (aged 73–74) Nice, Duchy of Savoy

Lodovico di Campofregoso (1415–1489) was an Italian nobleman who was three times doge of Genoa.

== Biography ==
The son of Bartolomeo di Campofregoso and Caterina Ordelaffi, he was the brother of Giano I di Campofregoso. He studied under humanist Bartolomeo Ivani, who later was also educator of his sons. His first military command took place in 1437 when his uncle, doge Tommaso di Campofregoso, sent him to fight the Del Carretto marquesses in the Riviera di Ponente and the lower Piedmont. Later appointed as captain of the Republic of Genoa, he was charged with the suppression of the Hussites and Waldensians.

In 1447, when Giano was elected doge, he held diplomatic positions in the court of Alfonso V of Aragon at Naples and in Rome. Here, Pope Nicholas V (also of Ligurian origins) appointed him as Lord of Corsica after the island had been completely subjugated to Genoa with the papal approval. Nicholas also gave him the lordship of Cyprus, where Lodovico sojourned for a period. In 1448 he returned to Genoa to assist his ill brother. At the latter's death, on 16 December, Lodovico was elected as doge.

During his first rule, he ended the conflict with the Marquisate of Finale. In September 1450, he abdicated in favor of his cousin Pietro di Campofregoso, and moved to the fortress of Sarzanello near Sarzana. In July 1461, he succeeded his cousin Spinetta di Campofregoso as doge, and received the fortress of Castelletto. However, contrasts with his cousin Paolo (now archbishop of Genoa) caused him to renounce to the crown of doge on 14 May 1462, being succeeded by Paolo the same day. On 8 June of that year he was again doge in place of Paolo, but the endless strife led to his second abdication, after which Paolo had him arrested at Castelletto, which he was also forced to surrender to his cousin.

In 1468 he ceded Sarzana to the Republic of Florence, causing, in the following years, numerous struggles between the Florentine and the Genoese for its possession. Having become an admiral of Ferdinand II of Aragon, in 1478 he returned to Genoa at the head of a fleet of seven galleys to help free the city from Gian Galeazzo Sforza's domination. He spent the last years of his life as a refugee in Nice, where he died in 1489.

Preceded by Giano I di Campofregoso	Doge of Genoa; 16 December 1447 – 4 September 1450	Succeeded by Pietro di Campofregoso
Preceded by Spinetta di Campofregoso	Doge of Genoa; 25 July 1461 – 14 May 1462	Succeeded by Paolo di Campofregoso
Preceded by Governor of Four Captains	Doge of Genoa; 8 June 1462 – January 1463	Succeeded by Paolo di Campofregoso
