= Raffaele Adorno =

Twenty-ninth Doge of Genoa

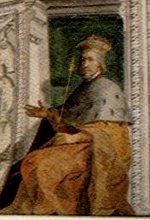
- Occupation: Doge of Genoa
- Years active: 28 January 1443 – 4 January 1447
- Predecessor: Tomaso di Campofregoso
- Successor: Barnaba Adorno

Raffaele Adorno (Genoa, 1375 – Genova, July 1458) was the twenty-ninth Doge of Genoa.

== Bibliography ==
- Buonadonna, Sergio; Mario Mercenaro (2007). De Ferrari Editori (ed.). Rosso doge. I dogi della Repubblica di Genova dal 1339 al 1797. Genova.

Preceded by Tomaso di Campofregoso	Doge di Genova; 28 January 1443 - 4 January 1447	Succeeded by Barnaba Adorno
