= Adorno family =

Genoese noble family

Adorno
- Coat of arms of the Adorno family
- Current region: Italy
- Origin: Republic of Genoa
- Founded: 12th century
- Founder: Adorno
- Titles: Doge of Genoa
- Motto: Iuncti et Fortes; Omnia Praetereunt; Adurnus Utroque Paratus
- Cadet branches: Botta Adorno

The Adorno family was a noble family of the Republic of Genoa, with the branches of Botta in Milan, several of whom were Doges of the republic.
The family is considered one of the most influential in the history of the republic.

The elder branch was extinct in 1634, and the titles, fiefdoms and surname were inherited by the Botta family of Milan, which has since been called Botta Adorno. The Botta family has been attested since 1298, with the progenitor Simone Botta, a citizen of Cremona. The Botta Adorno became extinct in 1882.

They were generally rivals of the Fregoso family. Both families rose to power in the late 14th century.

== Family tree ==
Adorno Family

Adorno (Unknown-1186)	Anna Felicia
Barisone; Adorno	Unknown	Pietro; Adorno
Unknown	Adorno; Adorno	Simona di San Siro	Lanfranco; Adorno	Benvenuta da Serino	Unknown	Unknown
Daniele; Adorno	Marietta; Giustiniani
Galeotto; Adorno	Gabriele Adorno (1320–1383)

== Notable members ==
=== Doges of the Republic of Genoa ===
- Gabriele Adorno (1320–1398), the 4th Doge of the Republic of Genoa
- Antoniotto I Adorno (1340–1398), the 6th Doge of the Republic of Genoa
- Giorgio Adorno (1350–1430), the 17th Doge of the Republic of Genoa
- Raffaele Adorno (1375–1458), the 29th Doge of the Republic of Genoa
- Barnaba Adorno (1385–1459), the 30th Doge of the Republic of Genoa
- Prospero Adorno (1428–1486), the 34th Doge of the Republic of Genoa
- Agostino Adorno (1488–1499)
- Antoniotto II Adorno (c. 1479–1528), the 45th Doge of the Republic of Genoa

=== Other members ===
- Lanfranco Adorno, grandfather of Gabriele Adorno
- Daniele Adorno, father of Gabriele Adorno
- Anselm Adornes (1424–1483), mayor of Bruges
- Francis Adorno (1531–1586), preacher
- Antoniotto Botta Adorno (1688–1774), high officer of the Habsburg Monarchy and a plenipotentiary of the Austrian Netherlands

== Castles and palaces ==
- Castello di Borgo Adorno
- Castello della Pietra
- Castello di Gabiano
- Castello di Bolzaneto
- Castello Adorno in Silvano d'Orba
- Castelletto di Branduzzo
- Castello di Savignone
- Palazzo Adorno of Lecce
- Palazzo Botta Adorno of Pavia
- Palazzo Cattaneo Adorno of Genoa
- Palazzo baronale di Caprarica of Lecce

== Cultural references ==
The first of the Adorno doges, Gabriele Adorno, is also the tenor role in Giuseppe Verdi's opera Simon Boccanegra.

== See also ==
- Doge of Genoa
- Republic of Genoa
- Fregoso
