= Tomaso di Campofregoso =

Doge of the Republic of Genoa (1370–1453)

19th Lifetime Doge of the Republic of Genoa
- In office 4 July 1415 – 23 November 1421
- Preceded by: Barnaba Guano
- Succeeded by: Dogeship vacant
- In office 3 April 1436 – 24 March 1437
- Preceded by: Isnardo Guarco
- Succeeded by: Battista Fregoso
- In office 24 March 1437 – 18 December 1442
- Preceded by: Battista Fregoso
- Succeeded by: Raffaele Adorno

Personal details
- Born: 1375 Genoa, Republic of Genoa
- Died: February 1453 (aged 77–78) Savona

Tomaso di Campofregoso (1375–1453) was doge of the Republic of Genoa three times.

== Biography ==
The son of Pietro Campofregoso, who had been doge for a single day on 13 July 1393, in the early 15th century he was named captain of the Republic of Genoa at Famagusta (Cyprus) and entered the political life of the city. In the same period, together with his brother Rolando (or Orlando), he tried a coup against the allegiance of Genoa towards France and its king Charles VI. He besieged the government palace with 200 soldiers, but he failed and was jailed for a while.

In 1403 he was appointed as governor of Corsica by the French governor Boucicault; after his return from the island, he became a member of the Council of the Elders of the Republic of Genoa.

On 4 July 1415 he was elected as 24th doge of the city, succeeding Barnaba Guano. He held that position until 23 November 1421 when, after obtaining the lordship of Sarzana, he had to renounce it. After a period in which Genoa was under the Visconti of Milan, Tomaso returned as doge from 3 April 1436 to 24 March 1437, when he resigned (or was deposed) in favour of his brother Battista di Campofregoso. However, the latter resigned after just a day, and Tomas became doge for the third time, remaining in charge until 18 December 1442.

As Doge, he infamously spent 500 lira for a reliquary. In his third term, he was hostile towards the Knights Hospitaller.

He was also lord of Savona from 1438 to 1440, and again from 1447, when he was released from imprisonment thanks to the intercession of his nephew and doge Giano I di Campofregoso, until February 1453, when he died.

| Preceded by Barnaba Guano | Doge of Genoa; 4 July 1415 – 23 November 1421 | Succeeded by Under Filippo Maria Visconti |
| Preceded by Isnardo Guarco | Doge of Genoa; 3 April 1436 – 24 March 1437 | Succeeded by Battista I di Campofregoso |
| Preceded by Battista I di Campofregoso | Doge of Genoa; 24 March 1437 – 18 December 1442 | Succeeded by Government of Eight Captains of Freedom |
