= 1447 =

1447 in various calendars
- Gregorian calendar: 1447; MCDXLVII
- Ab urbe condita: 2200
- Armenian calendar: 896; ԹՎ ՊՂԶ
- Assyrian calendar: 6197
- Balinese saka calendar: 1368–1369
- Bengali calendar: 853–854
- Berber calendar: 2397
- English Regnal year: 25 Hen. 6 – 26 Hen. 6
- Buddhist calendar: 1991
- Burmese calendar: 809
- Byzantine calendar: 6955–6956
- Chinese calendar: 丙寅年 (Fire Tiger); 4144 or 3937 — to — 丁卯年 (Fire Rabbit); 4145 or 3938
- Coptic calendar: 1163–1164
- Discordian calendar: 2613
- Ethiopian calendar: 1439–1440
- Hebrew calendar: 5207–5208
- Hindu calendars
- Vikram Samvat: 1503–1504
- Shaka Samvat: 1368–1369
- Kali Yuga: 4547–4548
- Holocene calendar: 11447
- Igbo calendar: 447–448
- Iranian calendar: 825–826
- Islamic calendar: 850–851
- Japanese calendar: Bun'an 4 (文安４年)
- Javanese calendar: 1362–1363
- Julian calendar: 1447; MCDXLVII
- Korean calendar: 3780
- Minguo calendar: 465 before ROC 民前465年
- Nanakshahi calendar: −21
- Thai solar calendar: 1989–1990
- Tibetan calendar: མེ་ཕོ་སྟག་ལོ་ (male Fire-Tiger); 1573 or 1192 or 420 — to — མེ་མོ་ཡོས་ལོ་ (female Fire-Hare); 1574 or 1193 or 421

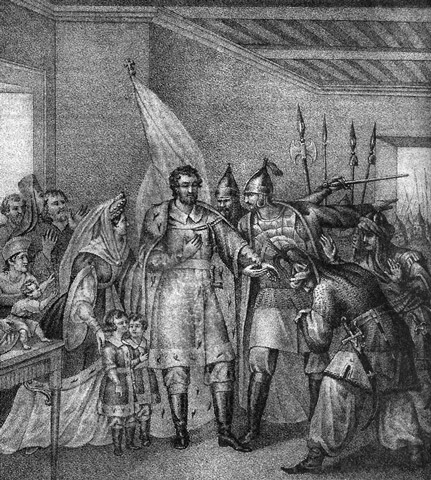
Vasily II is restored the throne of Moscow

Year 1447 (MCDXLVII) was a common year starting on Sunday of the Julian calendar.

== Events ==
=== January–March ===
- January 4 – Barnaba Adorno becomes the new Doge of the Republic of Genoa when his cousin Raffaele Adorno steps down after slightly less than four years in office. Baranaba holds the office for only a few weeks before being forced by the Adorno family's rivals, the Campofregoso family to flee the Doge's Palace on January 29.
- January 30 – Giano di Campofregoso is elected as the new Doge of Genoa the day after his family forces Barnaba Adorno out of the city.
- February 11 – The English Parliament is opened by King Henry VI for a three week session that closes on March 3.
- February 20 – Humphrey, Duke of Gloucester, uncle and heir apparent of King Henry VI of England, is arrested on a charge of treason. He dies from a stroke three days later while imprisoned at Bury St Edmunds in Suffolk Richard of York becomes next in line for the throne.
- February 23 – Pope Eugene IV, leader of the Roman Catholic Church since 1431, dies shortly after issuing his last papal bulls.
- February 27 – Vasily II returns as Grand Prince of Moscow after being recalled from exile by Dmitry Shemyaka, who had blinded him the year before. Shemyaka still attempts to control the Principality of Moscow.
- March 4 – The papal conclave opens at the Santa Maria sopra Minerva in Rome with 18 of the 24 living members of the College of Cardinals arriving to select a new Pope With 12 votes necessary for the require two-thirds needed for an election, Cardinal Prospero Colonna receives 10 and Cardinal Domenico Capranica gets 8.
- March 6 – On the fourth vote of the papal conclave, Prospero Colonna is still unable to gain more than 10 votes, and Cardinal Capranica addresses the group, warning that Rome would be under attack from the King of Aragon. At the intervention of Cardinal Giovanni Berardi, the cardinals begin voting for a compromise candidate, Tommaso Parentucelli, who wins 12 votes. Parentucelli then takes the regnal name of Pope Nicholas V, the 208th Bishop of Rome and Pope.
- March 13 – At Herat, Ulugh Beg (born Mirza Muhammad Taraghay) becomes the new ruler of the Timurid Empire upon the death of his father Sharukh Mirza, who had reigned for 42 years. The Empire is in decline but still controls most of what is now Afghanistan as well as parts of Iraq and Pakistan.
- March 16 – A major fire destroys the centre of Valencia.
- March 19 – The coronation of Tommaso Parentucelli as Pope Nicholas V takes place in Rome. The crown is placed upon his head by Cardinal Prospero Colonna, who had come within two votes of being selected as the Pope on March 5.
- March 26 – Dmitry Shemyaka flees Moscow from the supporters of Vasily II.
- Franzes I, Duke of Brittany, reverses the policy of his father, the late Duke Yann the Wise and allows the Caquin minority to have certain rights of trade within specified areas in the bishopric of Vannes.

=== April – June ===
- April 20 – Abdal-Latif Mirza, son of the recently-crowned Timurid Emperor Ulugh Beg, is defeated in battle at Nishapur by his cousin Ala al-Dawla Mirza, another claimant to the Timurid throne, shortly after Abdal-Latif had captured the city of Damghan and al-Dawla had conquered Mashad.
- April 22 – (5 Safar 851 AH) Khwaja Ubaidullah Ahrar becomes the new leader of the tariqa (order) of Süleymancılar among adherents of Sufism in what is now Turkey.
- May 6 – In a royal wedding at Lisbon, King Afonso V of Portugal is married to his first cousin, Princess Isabel of Coimbra, when both of them are 15 years old. Isabel is the daughter of Afonso's uncle, Dom Pedro, Duke of Coimbra, who continues to serve as the regent for King Afonso.
- June 25 – Kazimieras Jogailaitis, Grand Duke of Lithuania since 1440, is crowned King of Poland as Casimir IV Jagiellon, bringing an end to an interregnum that had existed since 1444 when Casimir's brother King Wladyslaw III had left Poland to fight in a Crusade against the Ottoman Turks.

=== July – September ===
- July 13 – At Suceava (now in Romania) Stefan II, Voivode of Moldavia since 1434, is killed in a coup d'état by his nephew, Roman II.
- July 22 – In a royal wedding at the cathedral in Madrigal de las Altas Torres in the Kingdom of Castile (now in Spain) Princess Isabella of Portugal, cousin of King Afonso VI, marries King Juan II of Castile.
- August 13 – The Milanese War of Succession begins in Italy when Filippo Maria Visconti, Duke of Milan since 1412, dies from natural causes. In that Visconti had no male heir, he had bequeathed the Duchy to King Afonso V, ruler of the Kingdom of Naples (in Italy) and the Crown of Aragon (in Spain), as well as his son-in-law Francesco I Sforza and Sigismund, Archduke of Austria.
- August 14 – As competition begins over who will inherit the right to rule the Duchy of Milan, members of the University of Pavia proclaim the Golden Ambrosian Republic (Aurea Repubblica Ambrosiana), ruled by a 12-member council, the Capitani della Libertà (Captains of Liberty), led by professor Giorgio Lampugnano.
- September 15 – Roman II seizes the throne of Moldavia after killing his uncle, Stephen II, and makes plans to enlist his other uncle, Petru as co-ruler.

=== October – December ===
- October 11 – In the Battle of Bosco Marengo in Italy, the army the Ambrosian Republic of Milan defeats the 3,000-member force of the Duchy of Orléans, killing half of their troops while losing only 500 of its 3,700 men.
- November 16 – In the War of the Milanese Succession, Francesco Sforza, leader of the forces of the Ambrosian Republic of Milan, overwhelms the city of Piacenza after a siege that began on October 1. According to a contemporary account, Piacenza "endured every evil" from the Milanese over the next 50 days. Cristoforo da Soldo comments that "as for the ravaging of the land that was plundered, it would take a great pile of paper to write down the many cruelties. All the churches were robbed.. virgins, married women, widows, and nuns, all of them were shamed, abused and wrongly molested."
- December 7 –Vlad II Dracul, ruler of Wallachia, and his eldest son Mircea are assassinated outside of Bucharest. Vladislav II succeeds him, with the assistance of John Hunyadi, beginning the Albanian–Venetian War.
- December 16 – Lodovico di Campofregoso becomes the Doge of the Republic of Genoa, succeeding his older brother, Giano I, who had taken office "for life

=== Date unknown ===
- The Siege of Soest, Germany, occurs, in the course of the Soest Feud.
- Tashi Lhunpo Monastery is founded by the 1st Dalai Lama at its original location in Shigatse, Tibet.
- Iizasa Ienao founds Tenshin Shōden Katori Shintō-ryū, the earliest historically verifiable Japanese koryū martial art, that will still be extant in modern times.

== Births ==
- February 1 – Eberhard II, Duke of Württemberg (d. 1504)
- February 4 – Lodovico Lazzarelli, Italian poet (d. 1500)
- April 5 – Catherine of Genoa, Italian author and nurse (d. 1510)
- April 17 – Baptista Mantuanus, poet and Carmelite (d. 1516)
- June 27 – Jean IV de Rieux, Breton noble and Marshal (d. 1518)
- July 5 – Costanzo I Sforza, Italian noble (d. 1483)
- September 10 – Paolo da San Leocadio, Italian painter in Spain (d. 1520)
- October 30 – Lucas Watzenrode, Prince-Bishop of Warmia (d. 1512)
- December 3 – Bayezid II, Ottoman Sultan (d. 1512)
- December 9 – Chenghua Emperor of China (d. 1487)
- December 15 – Albert IV of Bavaria (d. 1508)
- date unknown
  - Piero Capponi, Italian soldier and statesman (d. 1496)
  - Philippe de Commines, Flemish historian (d. 1511)
  - Catherine of Genoa, Catholic mystic (d. 1510)
- probable
  - Giovanni Antonio Amadeo, Italian sculptor (d. 1522)

== Deaths ==
- February 23
  - Pope Eugene IV (b. 1383)
  - Humphrey, Duke of Gloucester (b. 1390)
- March 6 – Colette of Corbie, French abbess and saint in the Catholic Church (b. 1381)
- March 13 – Shah Rukh Mirza, ruler of Persia and Transoxonia (b. 1377)
- March 31 – Robert Long, English politician (b. 1390)
- April 11 – Henry Beaufort, Cardinal, Lord Chancellor of England (b. 1377)
- April 22 – Yaqub al-Charkhi, Sufism (b. 1359)
- May 1 – Louis VII, Duke of Bavaria-Ingolstadt (b. 1368)
- May 12 – Hein Hoyer, German politician (b. 1380)
- July 6 – António Martins de Chaves, Catholic cardinal (b. 1390)
- July 9 – Gruffudd Vychan, Welsh knight (b. 1390)
- July 13 – Stephen II of Moldavia, Prince of Moldavia (b. 1410)
- August 5 – John Holland, 2nd Duke of Exeter, English nobleman and military commander (b. 1395)
- August 9 – Konrad IV the Elder, Polish priest (b. 1380)
- August 13 – Filippo Maria Visconti, Duke of Milan (b. 1392)
- October 31 – Tommaso Bellacci, Italian Roman Catholic professed member of the Third Order of Saint Francis (b. 1370)
- November 17 – Euphemia of Münsterberg, German sovereign (b. 1385)
- November 21 – Biagio Molino, Roman Catholic patriarch (b. 1380)
- December – Vlad II Dracul, Prince of Wallachia, and his son Mircea II
