= Peschiera Borromeo =

Peschiera Borromeo Peschera Borromee (Lombard)
- Comune
- Città di Peschiera Borromeo
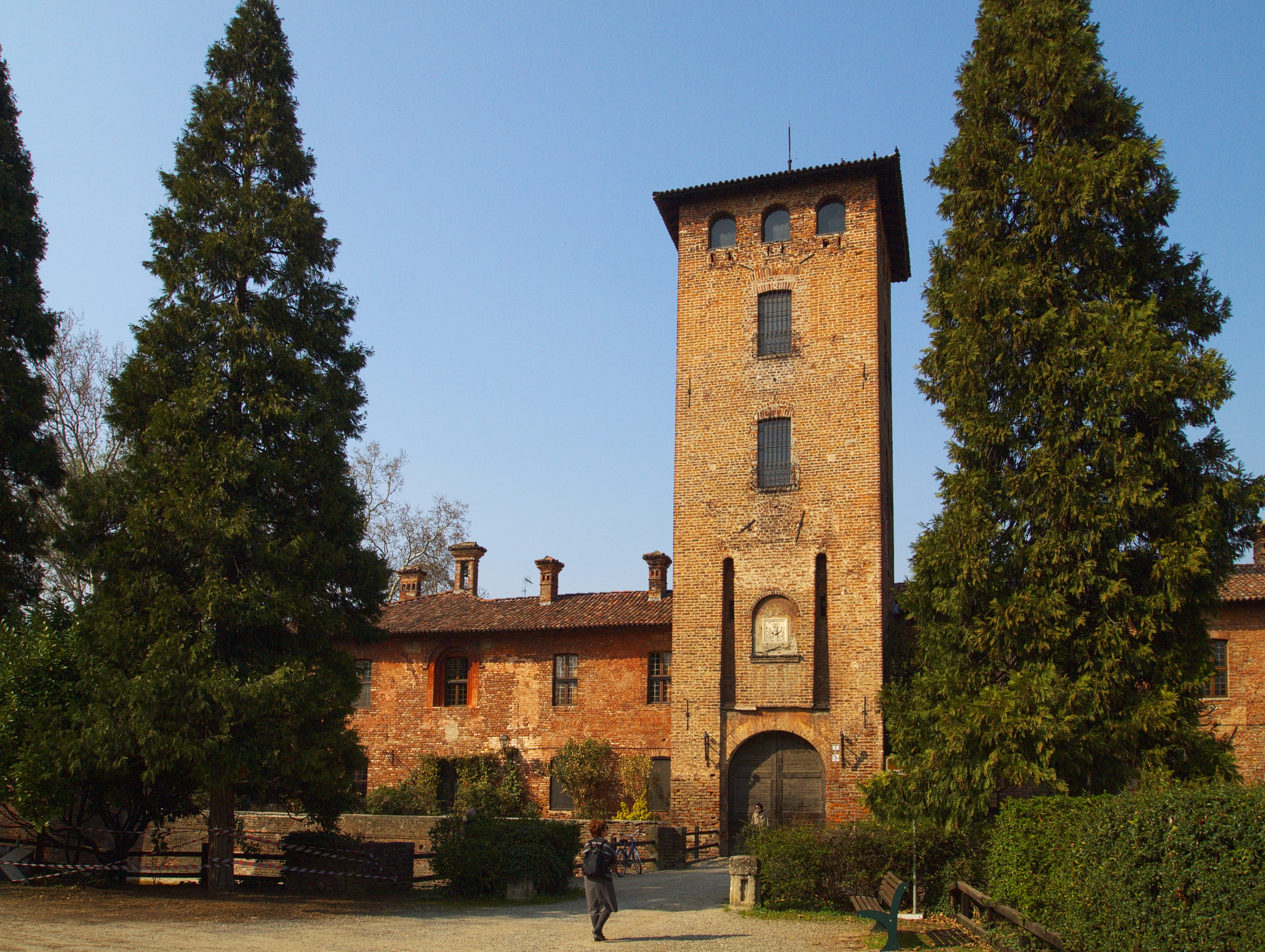
- The castle.

- Coat of arms

- Location within Italy Location within Lombardy
- Coordinates: 45°26′N 9°19′E
- Country: Italy
- Region: Lombardy
- Metropolitan city: Milan (MI)
- Frazioni: Bellaria, Bellingera, Bettola, Canzo, Foramagno, Linate, Mezzate, Mirazzano, San Bovio, Zeloforamagno

Government
  - Mayor: Caterina Molinari

Area
  - Total: 23.5 km^{2} (9.1 sq mi)
- Elevation: 107 m (351 ft)

Population (31 March 2018)
  - Total: 23,485
  - Density: 999/km^{2} (2,590/sq mi)
- Demonym: Peschieresi
- Time zone: UTC+1 (CET)
  - Summer (DST): UTC+2 (CEST)
- Postal code: 20068
- Dialing code: 02
- Website: Official website

Peschiera Borromeo (Italian pronunciation: [peˈskjɛːra borroˈmɛːo]; Milanese: Peschera Borromee [peˈskeːra buruˈmeː]) is a comune (municipality) in the Metropolitan City of Milan in the Italian region Lombardy, located about 12 kilometres (7 mi) southeast of Milan. It received the honorary title of city with a presidential decree on 6 August 1988.

Peschiera Borromeo borders the following municipalities: Milan, Pioltello, Segrate, Rodano, Pantigliate, San Donato Milanese, Mediglia.

== History ==
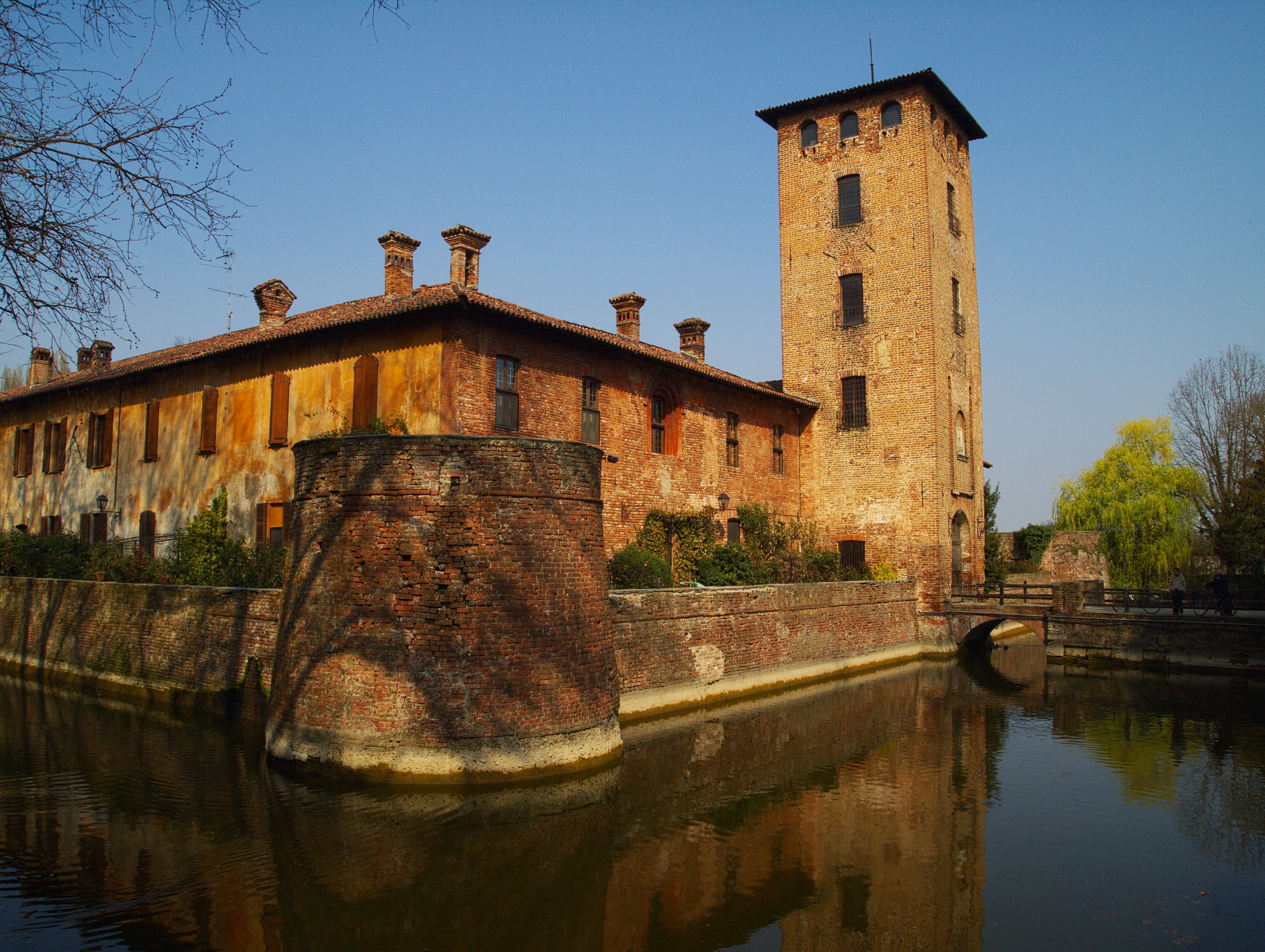
Castello Borromeo di Peschiera

The land was owned by the House of Borromeo of San Miniato in the 14th century and possibly earlier. Peschiera Borromeo's main attraction is the Borromeo Castle, built in 1437 by Vitaliano Borromeo. The Borromei were, during the later years of the Ambrosian Republic, pro-Francesco Sforza, and housed him in the castle while he besieged Milan in 1450. In 1461 Sforza, now the Duke of Milan, made Filippo Borromeo the Conte di Peschiera.

Peschiera was made a comune in 1863, and, partly to distinguish it from Peschiera del Garda and partly to honour the Borromeo Family, was given the full name Peschiera Borromeo.
