= Filippo Borromeo =

Filippo Borromeo (1419–1464) was the son of Vitaliano I Borromeo and Ambrosina Fagnini. He was second Count of Arona, and greatly expanded his father's banking trade throughout Europe. He married Francesca Visconti, the daughter of Count Lancillotto Visconti of Cicognola, through whom he had three sons and two daughters.

As the only son of his father Vitaliano, he inherited all his father's titles and wealth. He supported his father in his political involvement in the Ambrosian Republic. His father died in 1449 and shortly after Francesco Sforza captured Milan to dissolve the Republic and become Duke. Sforza recognized Vitaliano and Filippo's bravery and staunchness in the defence of Milan and reaffirmed to Filippo his inheritance. He also made him a Cavaliere Aurato, a Golden Knight.

Francesco Sforza trusted him and made him his counsellor, even as his father had been to the Visconti. Filippo, meanwhile, greatly expanded the family banking trade until he was one of the most prominent Italian bankers in the world, with branches in Barcelona and London. He was made Count of Peschiera by Sforza in 1461. He died in 1464, just two years before his friend and master Francesco Sforza. His eldest, Vitaliano II Borromeo, succeeded him as Count of Arona.
