= Visconti Castle (Vogogna) =

Castle in northern Italy

- Castello Visconteo di Vogogna
- Vogogna, Piedmont, Northern Italy
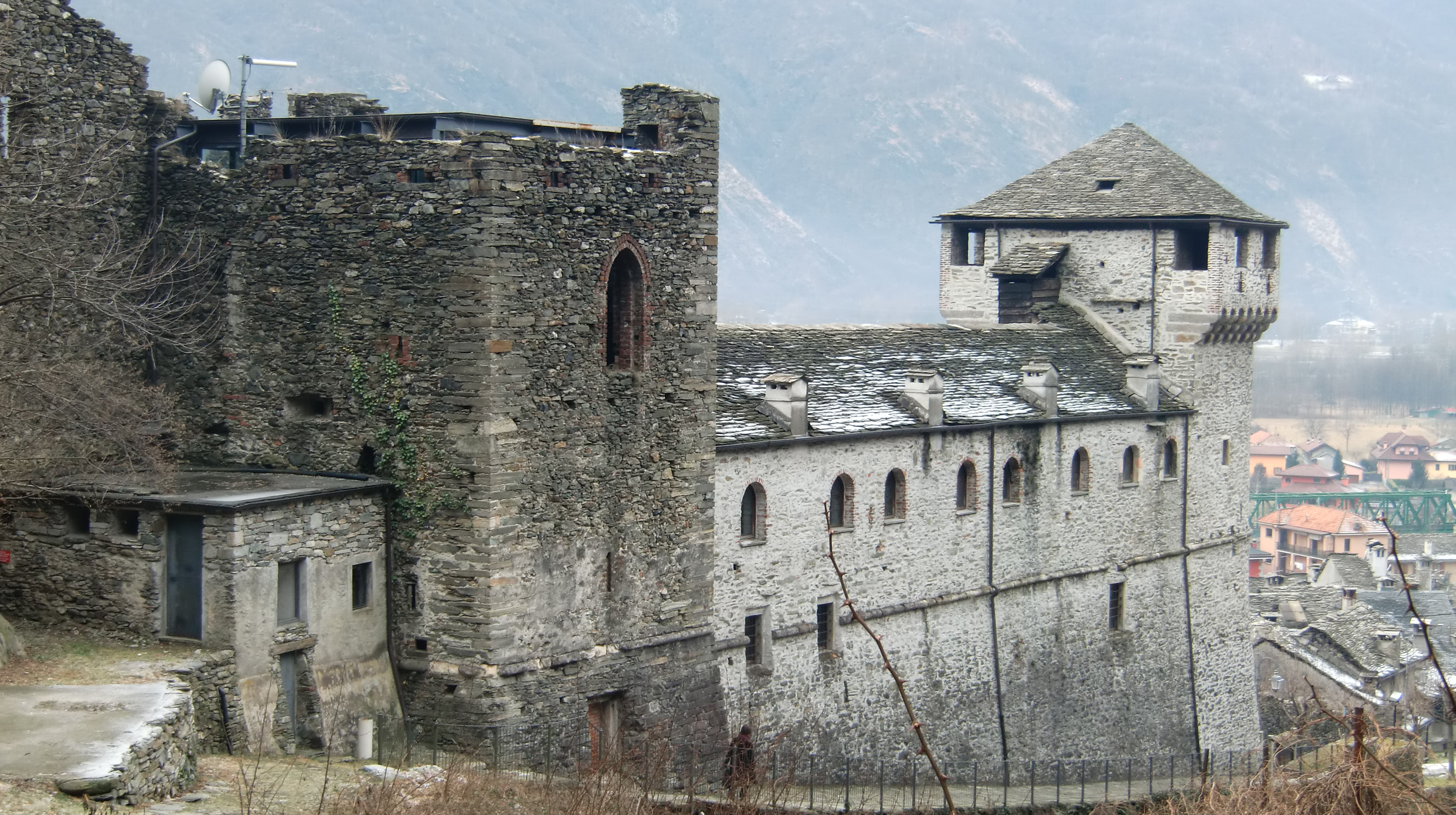
- Northern side

Site information
- Type: Medieval castle
- Owner: Municipality of Vogogna
- Open to the public: Yes
- Condition: Good

Location
- Coordinates: 46°00′28″N 8°17′45″E

Site history
- Built: 15th century
- Built by: Filippo Maria Visconti
- Materials: Stone

The Visconti Castle of Vogogna is a medieval stone-made castle in Vogogna, Piedmont, Northern Italy. It was built in the 14th century by the Visconti, lords and dukes of Milan.

== Location ==
The town of Vogogna is in the middle of Val d'Ossola. Since the Early Middle Ages, a fortification (Vogogna Rocca) existed on the valley's slopes, some hundred meters up from Vogogna. The castle stands on the higher border of the town, in a position where the path leading to the Vogogna Rocca starts.

== History ==
Since the erection of the Vogogna Rocca, probably a rampart defended the path that led to it from the site of the current castle. Here, a rectangular tower controlled the way's access. In the 14th century, the Visconti of Milan built the present castle. A long body, parallel to the way to the Rocca, was added to the west of the rectangular tower. At the end of the new body, toward the town, an imposing semicircular tower was erected. Along the southern side, a fortified wedge-shaped parade ground was added.

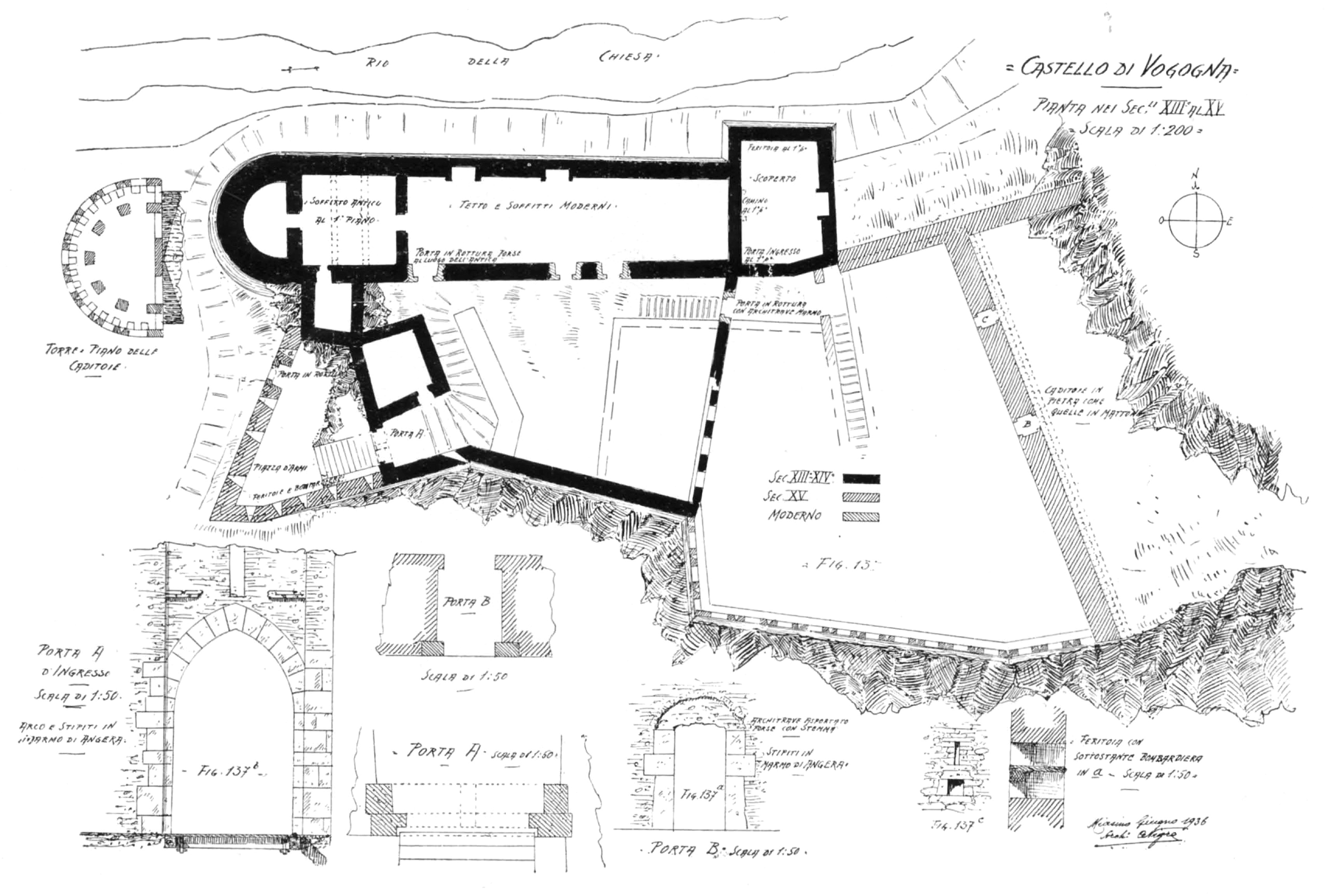
Castle ground plan, entrance door, and other architectural details

In 1446, Filippo Maria Visconti granted the castle and its territory to his treasurer Vitaliano Borromeo, a banker of Tuscan descent. In 1487, the Sforza confirmed it to the Borromeo family. For about three centuries, it remained almost continuously among their possessions. In 1515, Swiss troops, supported by men from the upper Val d'Ossola, occupied and damaged the castle.

In 1797, the castle passed into French hands during the Napoleonic era and then became municipal property. The tower was used as a prison, while the rest of the building as a dwelling and warehouse. In the 20th century, the Vogogna municipality gave increasing attention to the historical importance of the castle. The first restorations date back to 1927. They were completed in 2001.

== Today ==
The castle is open to visitors. It can be reached from the center of Vogogna through its characteristic small streets. The path to the Vogogna Rocca starts along the northern side of the castle.

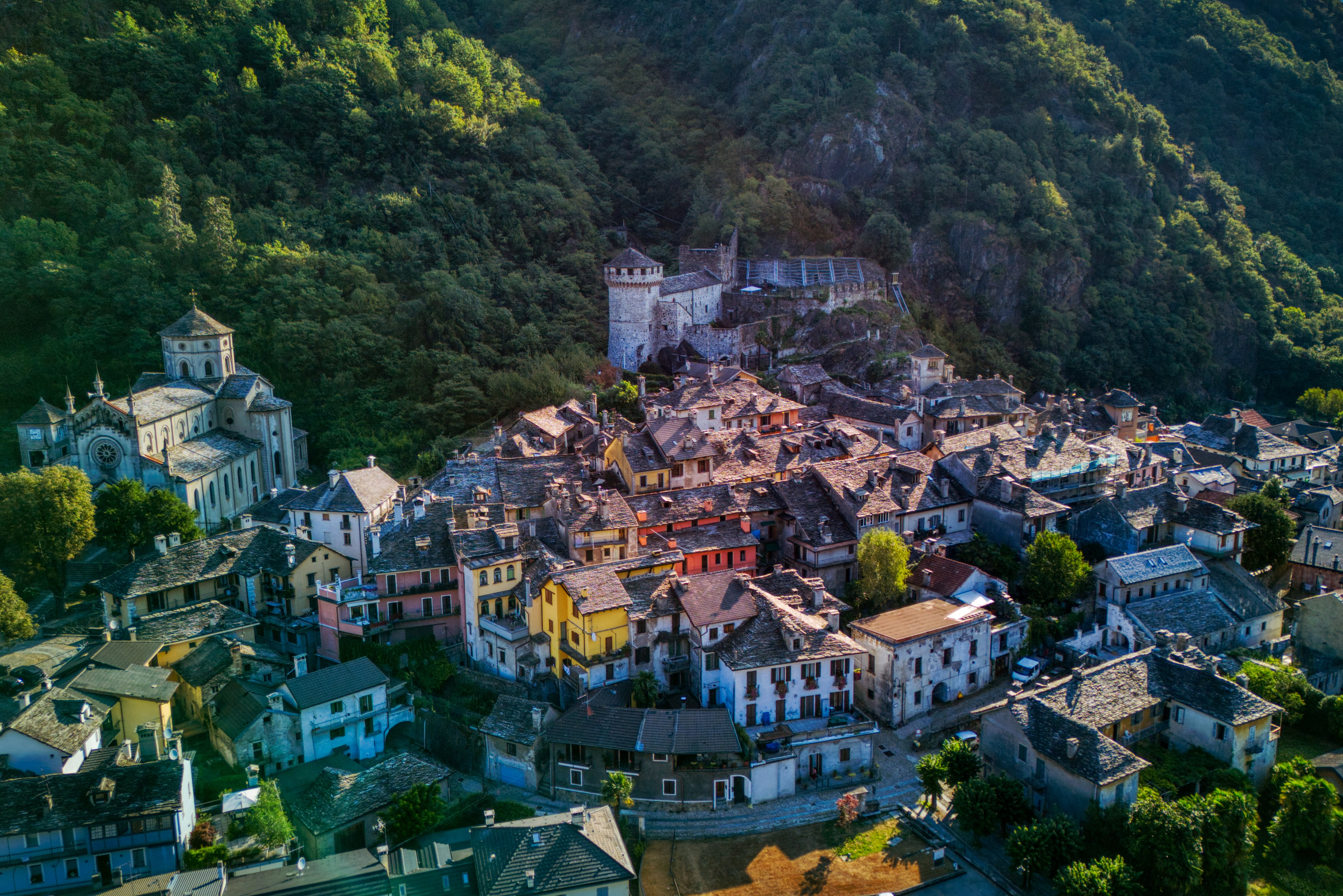
The castle above Vogogna

== Sources ==
- Conti, Flavio (1975). I castelli del Piemonte. Tomo I (in Italian). Milano: Görlich Editore.
- Del Tredici, Federico; Rossetti, Edoardo (2012). Percorsi castellani: da Milano a Bellinzona: guida ai castelli del ducato (in Italian). Castelli del ducato. ISBN 9788896451021.
- Nigra, Carlo (1937). Torri, castelli e case forti del Piemonte : dal 1000 al secolo 16 (in Italian). Novara: Editore E. Cattaneo.
