= Battle of Caravaggio =

1448 battle in Italy

- Part of Wars in Lombardy and the Milanese War of Succession
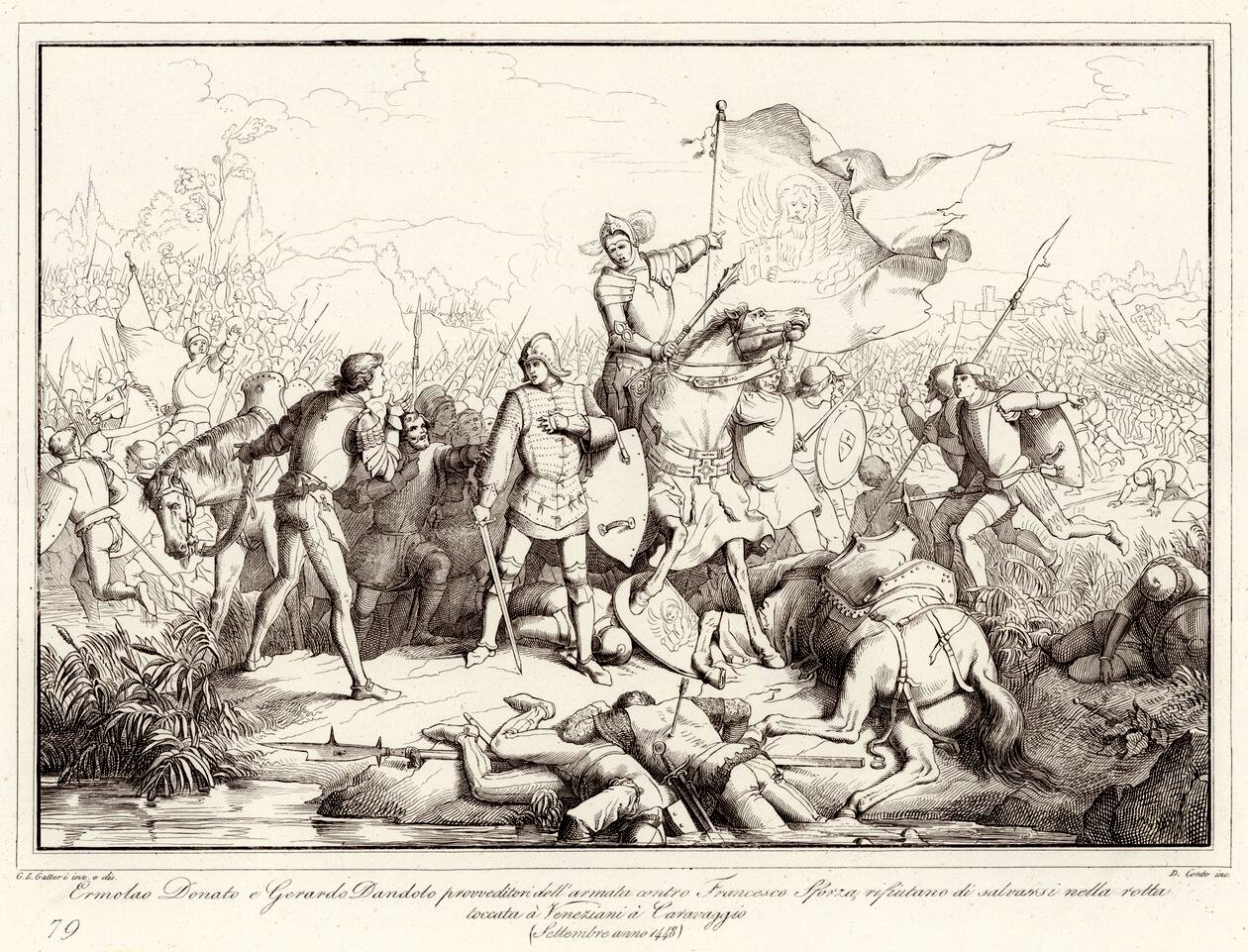
- The Venetian commanders Ermolao Donato and Gerardo Dandolo refuse to save themselves at the battle
| Date | 15 September 1448 |
| Location | Caravaggio, Italy |
| Result | Milanese victory |

Belligerents
| Ambrosian Republic | Republic of Venice |

Commanders and leaders
| Francesco Sforza | Micheletto Attendolo |

Strength
| 12,000 cavalry, 7,000 infantry | 12,500 cavalry, 3,000–4,000 infantry |

The Battle of Caravaggio was fought near Caravaggio, in Lombardy (northern Italy), between the armies of the Ambrosian Republic (Milan's short lived republic) and the Republic of Venice, on 15 September 1448.

The commander of the Milanese army was the condottiero Francesco Sforza, who later, with the help of the same Venetian armies, would conquer Milan and establish himself as its duke.
