= Milanese War of Succession =

War of succession

- Part of the Wars in Lombardy
Date	13 August 1447 – 9 April 1454
Location	Lombardy
Result	House Sforza Victory Treaty of Lodi

Belligerents
Ambrosian Republic (1447–50); Duchy of Savoy	Republic of Venice; Margravate of Mantua Duchy of Orléans (1447)	House of Sforza; Duchy of Milan (1450–4); Republic of Florence (1452–4); Kingdom of France (1452–4)

Commanders and leaders
Francesco Sforza (1447–8); Bartolomeo Colleoni (1447–8); Jacopo Piccinino (1447–50); Francesco Piccinino †	Francesco Sforza (1448–9); Bartolomeo Colleoni (1448–51, 53–54); Jacopo Piccinino (1450–4) Charles of Orléans	Francesco Sforza (1449–54); Bartolomeo Colleoni (1452–3); Cosimo de' Medici (1452–4); René of Anjou (1452–4)

The Milanese War of Succession was a war of succession over the Duchy of Milan from the death of duke Filippo Maria Visconti on 13 August 1447 to the Treaty of Lodi on 9 April 1454.

== Summary ==
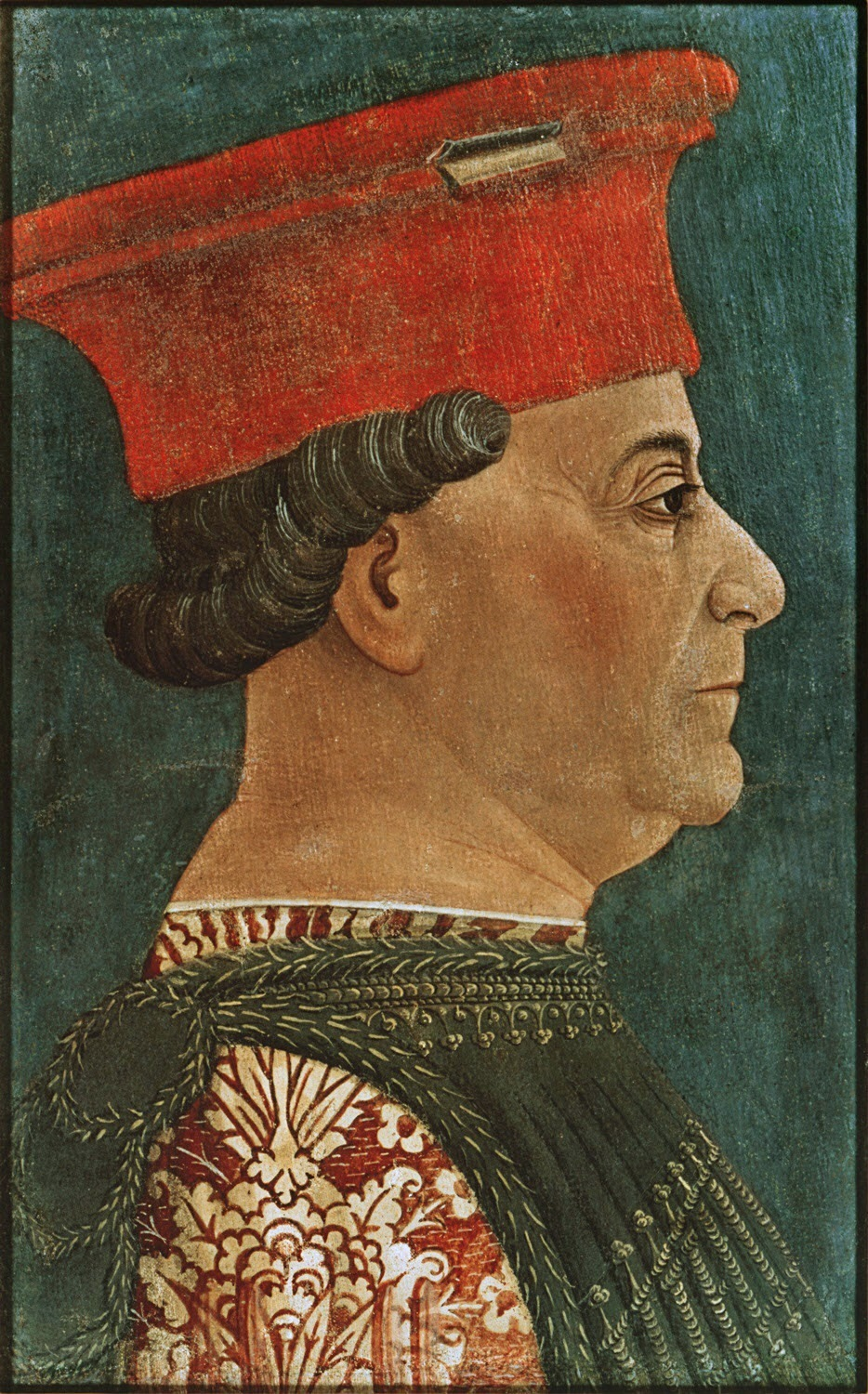
Portrait of Francesco Sforza (c. 1460) by Bonifacio Bembo.

Many pretenders claimed to be the rightful successor to Filippo Maria Visconti, who died without a male heir. These included the capable condottiero Francesco Sforza (husband of Visconti's illegitimate daughter), King Alfonso V of Aragon and Naples (to whom Visconti had bequeathed the Duchy in his will) supported by the influential Bracceschi family, Duke Charles of Orléans (son of Visconti's half-sister), Duke Louis of Savoy (brother of Visconti's widow), archdukes Albert IV and Sigismund of Austria (great-grandchildren of Bernabò Visconti), and Emperor Frederick III (who declared the Duchy should revert to the Holy Roman Empire on the extinction of its male line of succession). However, the citizens of Milan and several Lombard towns loyal to Milan proclaimed the Golden Ambrosian Republic (1447–1450) on 14 August 1447, which rejected any hereditary succession. With Sforza as its military leader, the Republic managed to seize and control most of the Duchy of Milan's territory by mid-1448 in battles against rebelling cities such as Pavia, Lodi, and Piacenza, and the invading Republic of Venice (which had already been at war with Milan before Visconti's death). The initial phase of the war may thus be characterised more as a struggle between republics rather than between rival claimants to a throne.

Nevertheless, in October 1448 Sforza defected to Venice in exchange for Venetian support for his claim as duke of Milan. Sforza quickly became a successful conquering warlord, whom the Venetians started to fear. Seeking to claim Milan for himself, the Duke of Savoy interfered in support of the Ambrosian Republic in 1449, but they were defeated by the Sforzan–Venetian forces under Bartolomeo Colleoni at the Battle of Borgomanero (22 April 1449). To prevent Sforza from becoming too powerful, the Venetians abandoned Sforza and allied themselves with the Ambrosians in subsequent battles. But it was too late: Sforza conquered the city of Milan after a siege in early 1450, ended the Ambrosian Republic, and was recognised as duke by the senate with support of the population.

Then Venice instead allied itself with Naples (an Aragonese possession), which also claimed Milan. Sforza rallied Cosimo de' Medici of Florence and Charles VII of France to his side. The latter sent René of Anjou (claimant to the Neapolitan throne, which he lost in 1442) with an expeditionary force to Italy around 1452 on the condition that Sforza would later aid him to regain Naples. The Milanese War of Succession ended with the Treaty of Lodi (9 April 1454), which recognised Sforza as the new duke of Milan (and established a balance of power in Italy, especially through the Italic League formed in August 1454). The Holy Roman Emperor would not do so until 1494, when Emperor Maximilian I formally invested Francesco's son, Ludovico Sforza, as duke of Milan.

== Battles ==
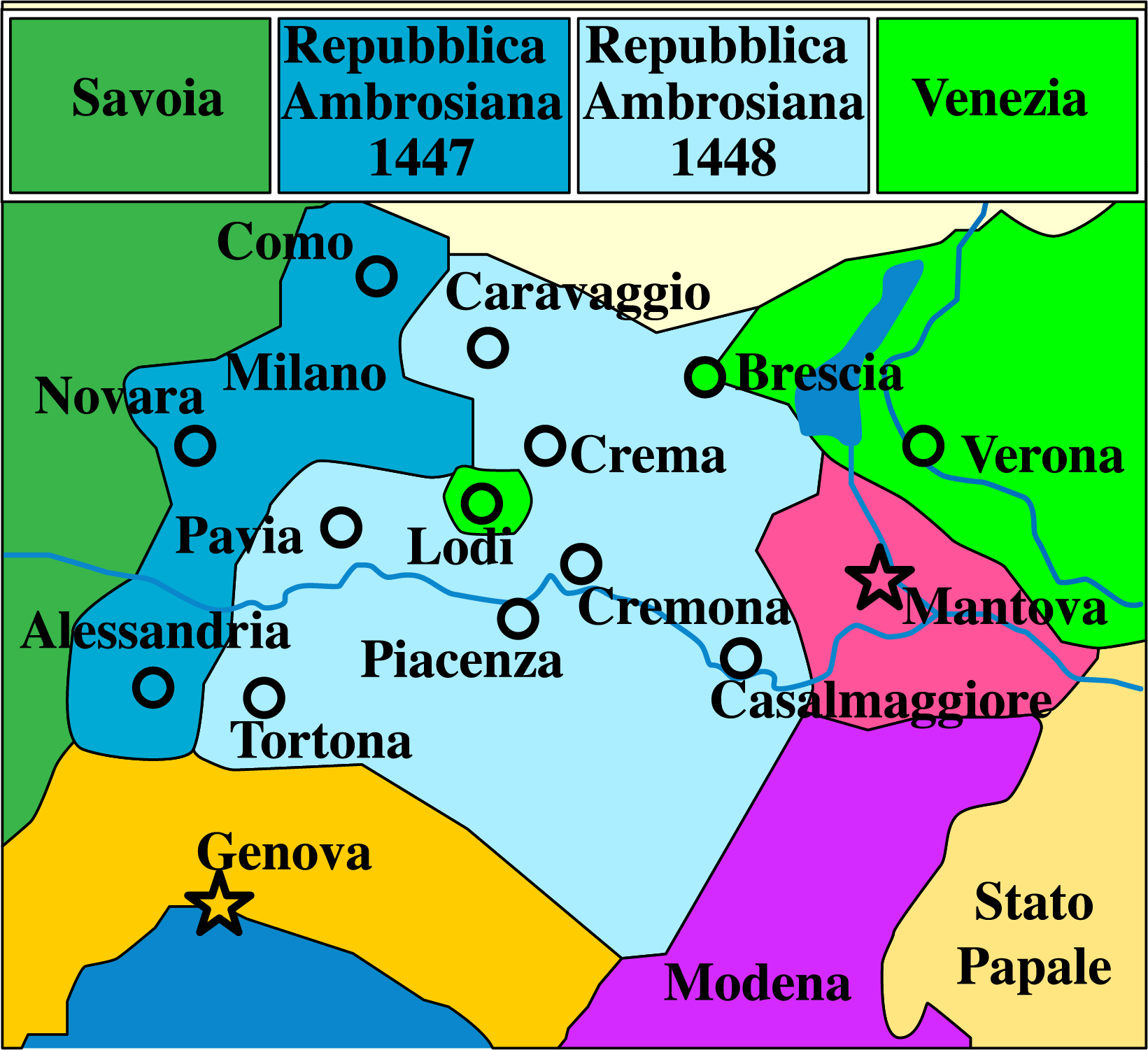
Initial Ambrosian Republic territory in 1447 Ambrosian conquests by 1448 Republic of Venice territory in 1448 Duchy of Savoy

- 11 October 1447: Battle of Bosco Marengo. Bartolomeo Colleoni (Ambrosian Republic) defeats Charles, Duke of Orléans (France)
- 1447: Capture of Pavia. Sforza (Ambrosian Republic) captures Pavia (which had proclaimed independence)
- 1447: Siege and sack of Piacenza. Sforza (Ambrosian Republic) captures Piacenza (Venice)
- October 1447 – September 1449: Siege of Lodi. Lodi (Venice) holds out against the Piccinino brothers (Ambrosian Republic) and joins Sforza
- End July – 15 September 1448: Siege of Caravaggio. Sforza (Ambrosian Republic) captures Caravaggio (Venice)
- 15 – 16 July 1448: River Battle of Casalmaggiore. Sforza (Ambrosian Republic) defeats Venice
- 15 September 1448: Battle of Caravaggio. Sforza (Ambrosian Republic) defeats Venice and Mantua
- 22 April 1449: Battle of Borgomanero. Colleoni (Venice and Sforza) defeats Savoy and the Ambrosian Republic
- 25 April – 1 May 1449: Siege of Melegnano. Sforza (for himself) captures Melegnano (Ambrosian Republic, supported by Venice)
- 6 July 1449: Battle of Castione. Ambrosian Republic defeats Swiss canton of Uri
- December 1449: Battle of Monte di Brianza. Sforza (for himself) defeats the Ambrosian Republic and Venice
- January 1450: Battles of Cantù and Asso. The Ambrosian Republic and Venice defeat Sforza
- 1449 – 24 February 1450: Siege of Milan. Sforza (for himself) conquers Milan and destroys the Ambrosian Republic
- 1450: Battle of Castiglione Olona.
- 1453: Battle of Ghedi. Sforza (Duchy of Milan) defeats Venice

== Sources ==
- Ady, Cecilia M.; Armstrong, Edward (1907). A History of Milan under the Sforza. Methuen & Co. Archived from the original on 13 October 2012 – via Questia.
