= Battle of Bosco Marengo =

1447 battle in Bosco Marengo, Piedmont, Italy

- Part of the Wars in Lombardy and the Milanese War of Succession
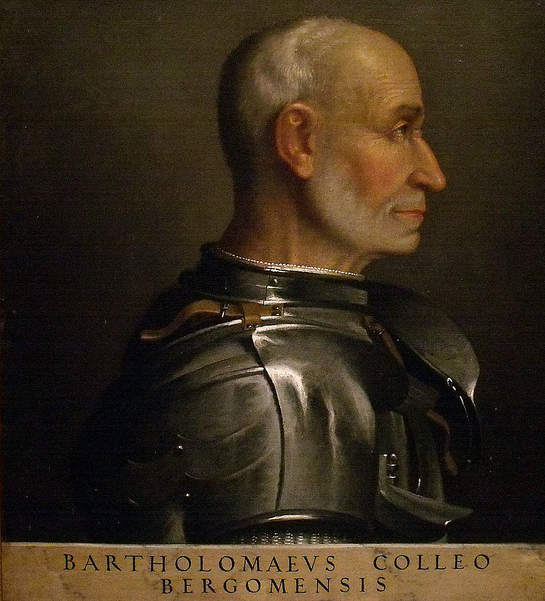
- Bartolomeo Colleoni in armor
Date	October 11, 1447
Location	Bosco Marengo, Piedmont
Result	Ambrosian victory

Belligerents
Golden Ambrosian Republic	Duchy of Orléans

Commanders and leaders
Bartolomeo Colleoni; Astorre II Manfredi	Renaud du Dresnay (P)

Strength
3,700 troops	3,000 troops

Casualties and losses
500 killed	1,500 killed only half could retreat back to France; 300 captured

The Battle of Bosco Marengo (aka Battle of Frascata) was fought in the autumn of 1447.

The Duke of Orleans, Charles I, son of Valentina Visconti, laid claim to the Duchy of Milan and dispatched an army from the Dauphiné and Lyonais under Renaud du Dresnay into Lombardy. The Golden Ambrosian Republic responded and dispatched a total of 3,700 troops under Colleoni to Alessandria. At Bosco Marengo, battle was joined and the French suffered a complete defeat with their general Renaud du Dresnay being captured and later ransomed for 14,000 'couronnes'.
