= Vitaliano I Borromeo =

Italian noble and politician

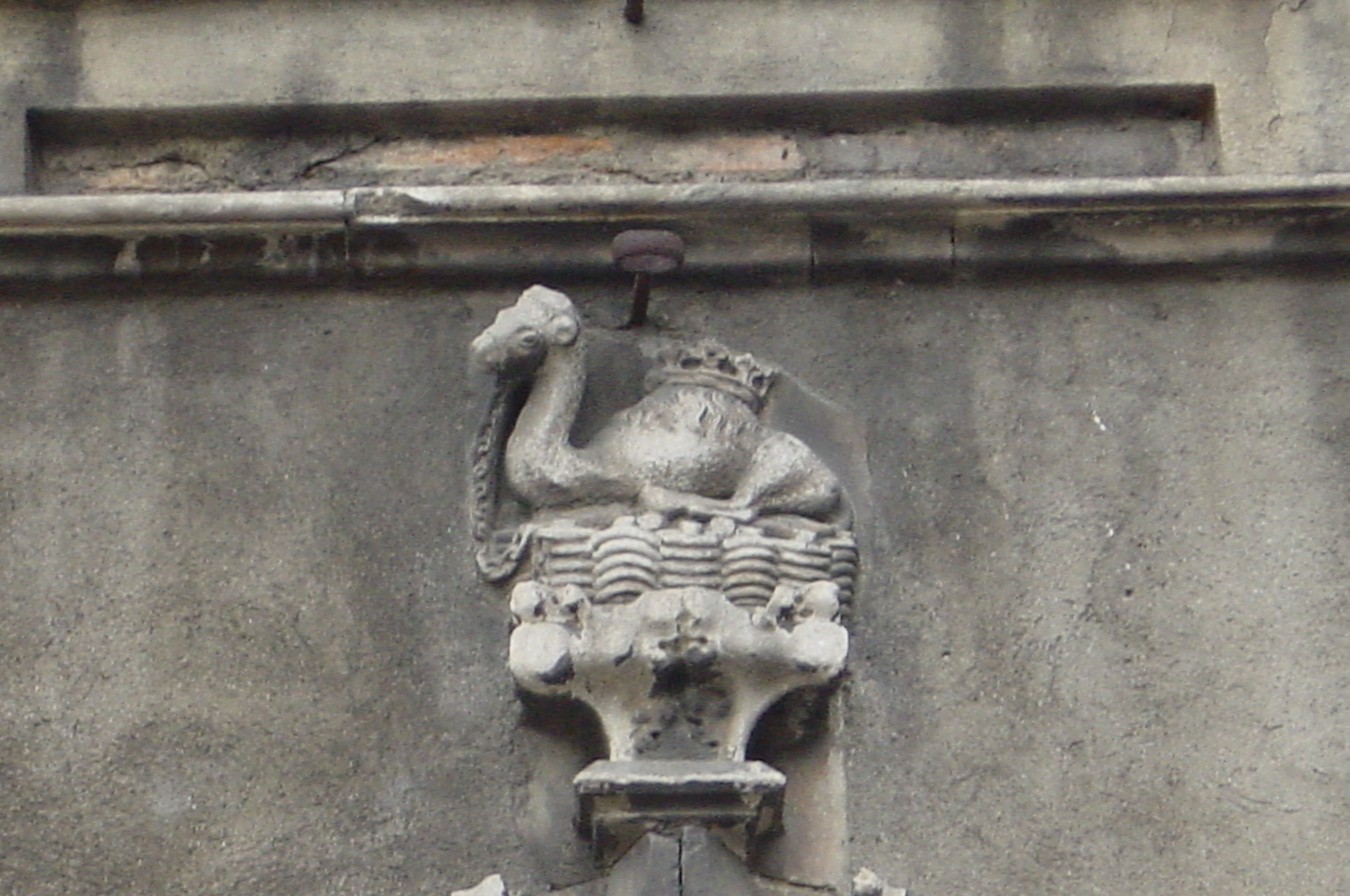
- The heraldic camel legendarily added to the family coat of arms by Vitaliano I Borromeo.

Treasurer of the Duchy of Milan
- In office 1418–1449

Ducal Counselor
- In office 1441–1447

Captain and Defender of Liberty
- In office August 1447 – January 1448

Personal details
- Born: c. 1390
- Died: 4 October 1449 Arona
- Resting place: S. Francesco Grande, Milan
- Party: Ghibelline
- Spouse: Ambrosina Fagnani
- Children: Filippo Borromeo
- Occupation: Banker, politician, nobleman

Vitaliano I Borromeo (died 1449) was an Italian Ghibelline nobleman from Milan, first Count of Arona. His father was Giacomo Vitaliani, ambassador of Padua to Venice, and his mother Margherita was of the prosperous family of Borromeo. He married Ambrosina Fagnani, and his only son was Filippo Borromeo. Many of his descendants took his name.

The events of Vitaliano Borromeo's youth and earlier life are unknown. According to one story, as a young man he was running out of money, and sold all his possessions to buy donkeys with covers embroidered with a camel sitting atop a basket, symbolizing his poverty. His rich but stingy uncle, Giovanni Borromeo, had previously denied his requests for money, but was so amused by this act designed to impress him that he allowed Vitaliano to enter his house.

Vitaliano was given citizenship of Milan in 1416 and rose in wealth and prestige. He bought much property and served as treasurer in 1418. At some point, he began a banking service that, under his son Filippo, would rise into prominence in all the major markets of Europe. He came into his inheritance in November 1431 when his uncle Giovanni Borromeo died, and he adopted his last name. In 1439 Filippo Maria Visconti awarded him the city of Arona on the western shore of Lake Maggiore, and six years later the Duke made him Count of Arona. In 1441 he was made a Milanese counsellor. In 1447 he was elected a Captain and Defender of the Liberty of Milan at the first elections of the Ambrosian Republic.

As a staunch Ghibelline, he hosted a conspiracy in February 1449 against the dictator Carlo Gonzaga, led by his friends Giorgio Lampugnano and Teodoro Bossi. The conspiracy was discovered, and while Lampugnano and Cotti were killed, Borromeo fled to Arona. While in Arona over the summer, he managed to purchase Angera from the Visconti for 12,800 Imperial lire, giving him mastery of all Lake Maggiore. He died that October of an unknown cause and was buried in Milan. His son Filippo was given his inheritance by Francesco Sforza, who also, according to legend, added three rings to the Borromeo family coat of arms.

== Sources ==
- Borromei family
- Cromwell, Peter (2007). "Borromean rings: Family Crest". Archived from the original on 2008-04-21.
- Marek, Miroslav. "Borromeo family genealogy". Genealogy.EU.
- "The Origins of the Borromeo Family". Borromeo Turismo.
- Ady, Cecilia Mary (1907). Armstrong, Edward (ed.). A History of Milan under the Sforza. London: Methuen & Co.
