= Golden Ambrosian Republic =

Milanese republic

Coordinates: 45°28′N 09°10′E

Golden Ambrosian Republic Aurea Republega Ambrosiana (Lombard) Aurea Repubblica Ambrosiana (Italian)
- 1447–1450
- Flag seal

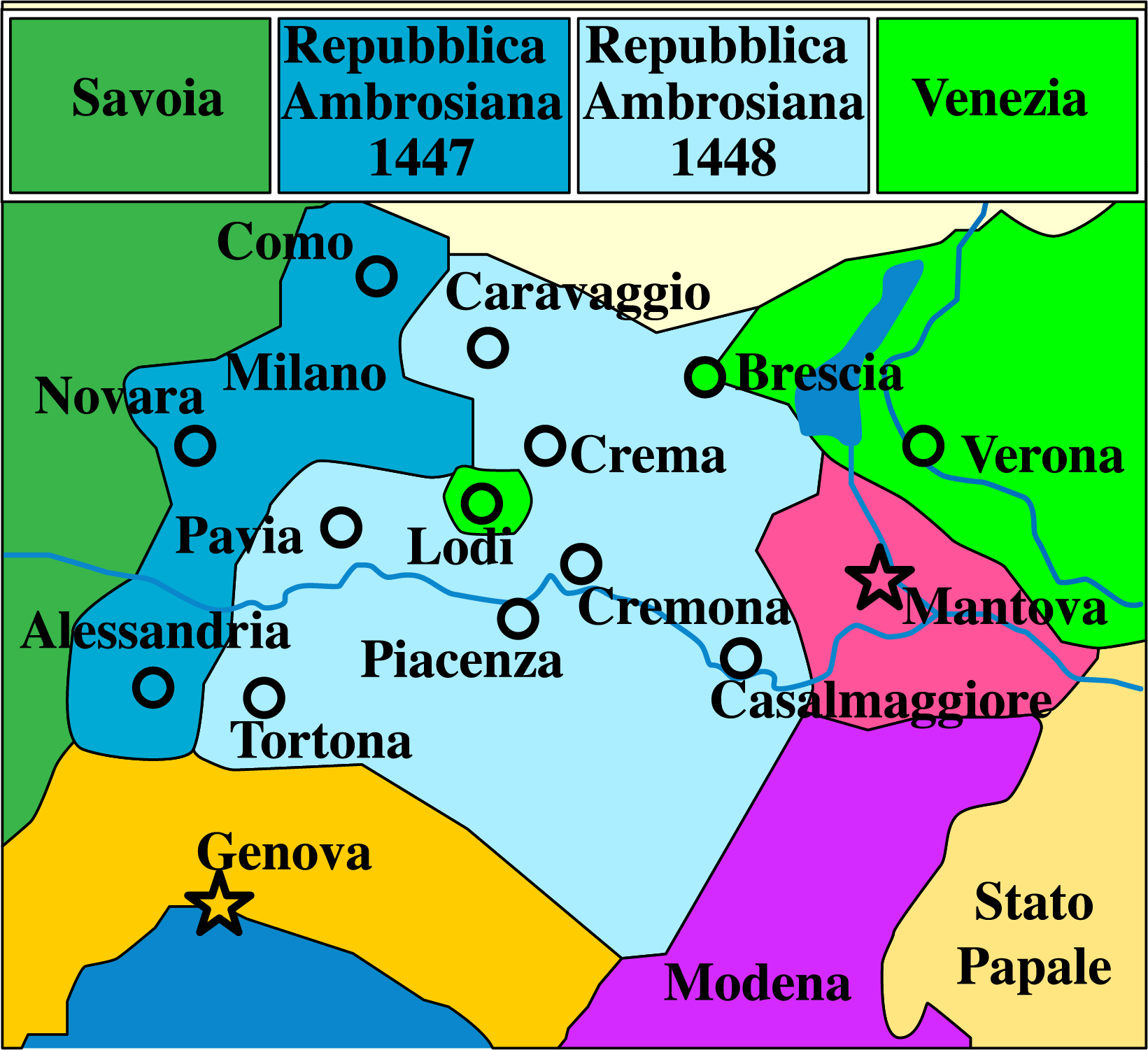
- Borders of the Golden Ambrosian Republic in 1447 and 1448
- Capital: Milan
- Common languages: Lombard
- Religion: Roman Catholicism
- Government: Directorial republic
- Captains and Defenders of the Freedom
  - 1447–1450: Mains of the 12 members: Carlo Gonzaga of Milan; Vitaliano I Borromeo
- Legislature: Parish Assembly
- Historical era: Late Middle Ages
  - Established: 1447
  - Disestablished: 1450
- Currency: Soldo
Preceded by	Succeeded by
Duchy of Milan	Duchy of Milan

The Golden Ambrosian Republic (Lombard: Aurea Republega Ambrosiana; Italian: Aurea Repubblica Ambrosiana; 1447–1450) was a short-lived republic founded in Milan by members of the University of Pavia with popular support, during the first phase of the Milanese War of Succession. They held out against France (battle of Bosco Marengo), the Republic of Venice (battle of Caravaggio), and the Swiss (battle of Castione); the Republic was abolished by the condottiero Francesco Sforza, who made himself Duke of Milan.

== History ==
=== Foundation ===
When Filippo Maria Visconti, Duke of Milan, died on 13 August 1447, the city was thrown into confusion by his unexpected demise and the speed with which claimants to his title acted. Filippo Maria had no heir through male bloodlines and therefore a succession crisis occurred.

The claimants to the throne of the Duchy of Milan were:

- King Alfonso V of Aragon, to whom Filippo Maria had left the throne according to his will written a day before his death;
- Duke Charles of Orléans, nephew of Filippo Maria through his half-sister Valentina Visconti;
- Dukes Albert and Sigismund of the House of Habsburg, cousins of Filippo Maria and great-grandsons of Bernabò Visconti;
- Emperor Frederick III, of the Holy Roman Empire, who (with support of the Pope) declared that the Duchy should revert to the Empire on the extinction of its male heirs;
- Francesco Sforza, a famous condottiero and Filippo Maria's son-in-law through his illegitimate daughter Bianca Maria Visconti.

The two most prominent candidates supported by the Milanese population were however Alfonso of Aragon and Francesco Sforza.

The Bracceschi family, supporters of the King of Aragon, seized the city on the 13th, the night of Duke Filippo Maria's death, forcing the captains to swear allegiance to Alfonso. However, other influential citizens believed that a republic could be proclaimed. Learned bodies, such as the College of Jurisprudence in Pavia, painted the days of the old republic as a golden age. The merchants, seeing the prosperity of Republican Venice, supported this idea. On the morning of the 14th, Republicans stirred the populace to rise against the Bracceschi, under the leadership of Antonio Trivulzio, Giorgio Lampugnano, Innocenzo Cotta, and Teodoro Bossi (members of the College of Jurisprudence). A republic was declared behind the Palace of the Commune, and the captains abandoned their oaths to Alfonso in favor of it. The Bracceschi were driven from Milan, and the new republic was called the Golden Ambrosian Republic, after St. Ambrose, the 4th century bishop of Milan, who was adopted as the Republic's patron. They took the old constitution and revised it that same day to suit their needs, electing 24 Capitani e difensori della libertà ("Captains and Defenders of Liberty") to frame laws. This group was elected regularly and later reduced to twelve.

=== Early existence ===
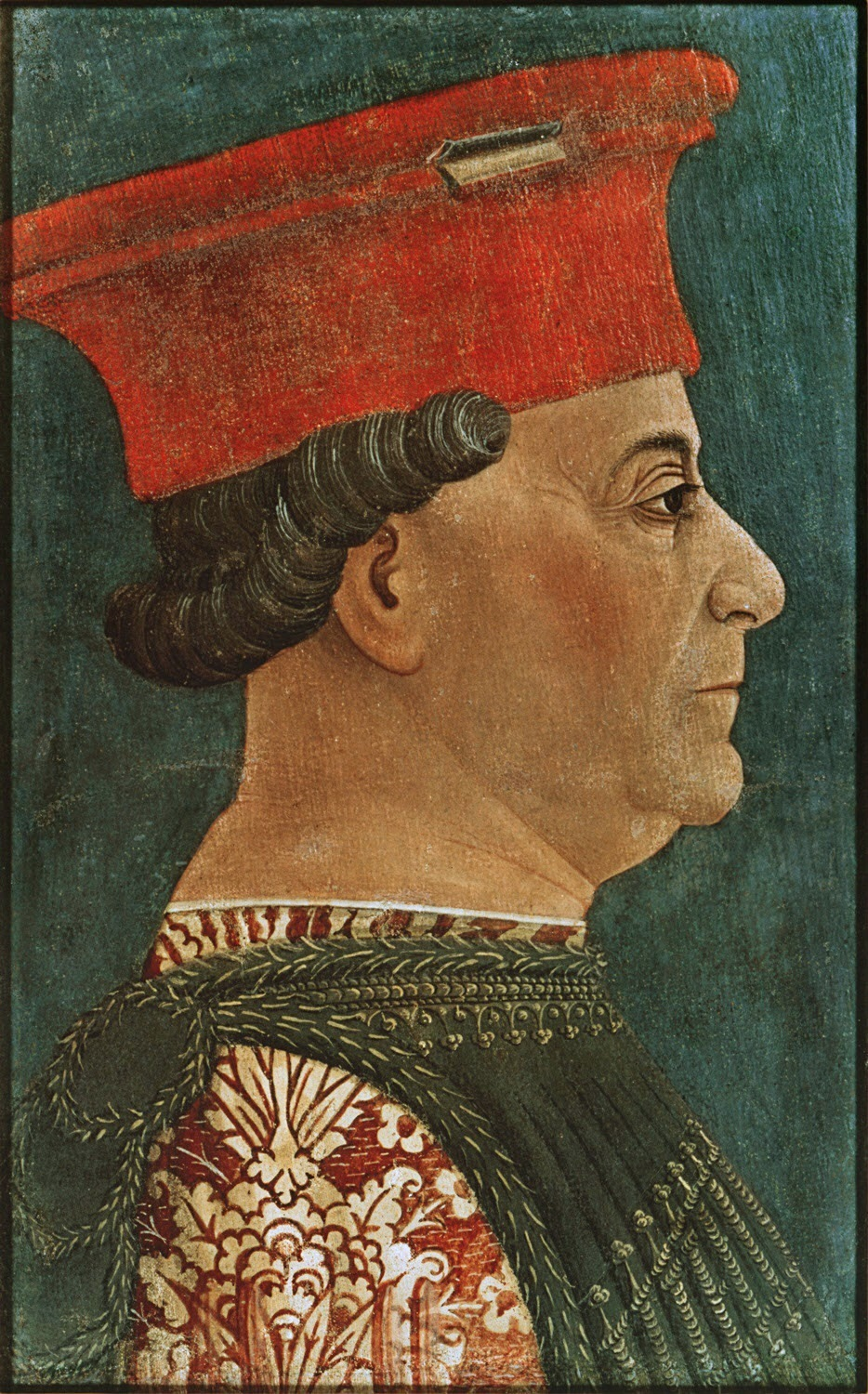
Francesco Sforza

The idea of a radical renewal of liberties in the cities did not suit the powers of North Italy, who had been in league against Visconti territorial gains in a decades-long series of wars interrupted by truces, most recently the Peace of Cremona of 20 November 1441. Venice was already at war with Milan, and the Republic was struck a sore blow as previously Milanese cities including Pavia, Lodi, and Piacenza defected or declared their independence. Besides the loss of support and defensive locations, the drop in revenue also caused a brief financial crisis resolved by the imposition of new taxes. Venice, now occupying Lodi and Piacenza, refused to listen to Milan's pleas for peace. Milan turned to Francesco Sforza, the greatest military leader of his day, offering him the position of Captain-General and the city of Brescia. Although he wished – and indeed, planned – to succeed his father-in-law as Duke, he decided to accept the position and promised rewards. A draft was declared in Milan on 13 September.

Sforza quickly captured independent Pavia when his mother-in-law persuaded the city's ruling condotierro to relinquish it to him, and the Republic grudgingly allowed him to keep it with the title of Count, fearing that the Pavians and their large arsenal might instead offer themselves to Venice if they refused. Sforza promised the Pavians no new taxes, respect for the old laws, payment for the officials he retained, and the repair of the city bridges and walls. He kept these promises faithfully and so won over the people of Pavia, establishing his rule. Pavia was previously almost a second capital to Milan, and gave Sforza his own seat of power. The city was also in a strategic location on the Po River, situated where it could block the Venetians from coming to the relief of the beleaguered Piacenza by water. Returning to the siege of Piacenza and finding the city not likely to crumble by starvation, he resolved to storm it. Employing cannon in an almost unheard-of manner, he opened up a breach in Piacenza's walls and sacked the city. The news of Piacenza's sack was greeted by three days' rejoicing in Milan. Meanwhile, Milanese Captain Bartolomeo Colleoni captured Tortona which had previously proclaimed Sforza as its lord, stealing it from the now dangerously powerful Sforza. This caused even greater rejoicing, for the Milanese feared Sforza.

In January 1448, the terms of the previous Captains and Defenders ended, and in the following election the Guelphs rose to political prominence. Being especially adverse to Sforza, they entered peace negotiations with Venice, which, also threatened by Sforza's growing power, was willing to come to terms, albeit dictated by herself. Two of the Ghibellines who helped to found the Republic, namely Lampugnano and Bossi, stirred the populace against the Guelphs in a massive demonstration before the Court of Arengo. The Council of Nine Hundred was forced to abandon its plans for peace, and Sforza was given the go-ahead for his next campaign to seize the Adda River. However Sforza's plans were voted down by the Republic in favor of more traditional tactics, namely besieging Lodi directly. While this happened, the Venetian fleet under Andrea Quirini assaulted the bridge of Cremona. However, Sforza's wife Bianca was there, and led the defense until her husband relieved the city. The Venetian fleet withdrew and entrenched while it waited for the arrival of the Venetian army. Sforza trapped the fleet behind its defenses and, with his unorthodox use of artillery, utterly destroyed or captured every one of the seventy ships. This victory was celebrated in Milan, but the leaders of the Republic still feared Sforza, and sent him off to occupy himself with the Ghiarad'adda region while Lodi and Caravaggio were besieged, hoping that their fall would end the war.

Ultimately both Sforza's Milanese forces and the Venetian army under Micheletto Attendolo met at Caravaggio. The siege remained unbroken throughout July and until 15 September, when Attendolo launched a surprise-attack on Sforza, so rapidly that he did not even have time to buckle on his armor. What might have been a rout Sforza turned into a great victory as he set the example for his troops on the front line and utterly defeated the Venetian army, capturing three generals. Caravaggio fell, and despite rejoicing in Milan, little gratitude was given by the government to the architect of the victory, and the Republic sent him on to Lodi, determined to end the war. It was here, when a satisfactory end to the war seemed imminent, that the Milanese took a fatal misstep.

=== Sforza's defection and the Guelph–Ghibelline feud ===
In Milan, Sforza's enemies worked continually against him. The Piccinino brothers, sons of famous condottiere Niccolò Piccinino and former Captains-General before being replaced as supreme military commanders by Sforza, convinced the suspicious Republic to work secretly against Sforza. Rumors were spread among the troops about not receiving payment at the end of the war if they remained with Sforza, and Sforza himself was ordered back from the siege of Brescia, the city promised to him, while the citizens were secretly told to hold out until peace, already in the works, was signed. Sforza learned of this treachery and defected to the Venetians for 13,000 ducats and the Duchy of Milan in return for the Ghiaradadda, Crema, and his service. The treaty was signed on 18 October 1448, and Sforza now undid everything he had labored for over the past year. With such a powerful man on the Venetian side, it was the beginning of the end of the Golden Ambrosian Republic. Public opinion, despite the government's position, was generally pro-Sforza, and only an impassioned, patriotic speech from Giorgio Lampugnano subdued it at last. The Piccinino brothers became Captains-General once more, but were not as capable as the brilliant Sforza.

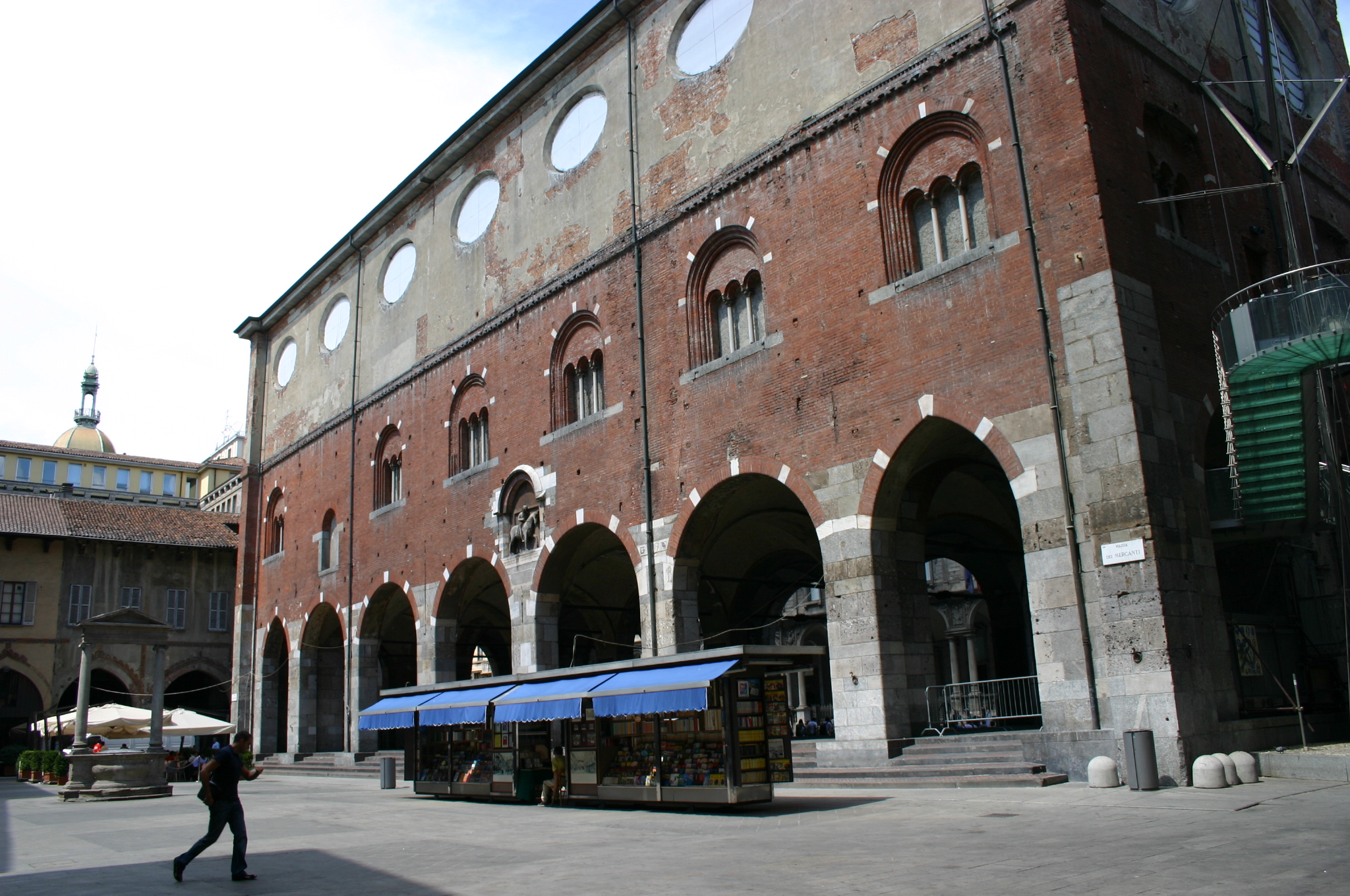
The piazza of the Broletto, where the heads of slain Ghibellines were raised.

This was reinforced by the internal dissension that was prominent in Milan. Crime and mob violence were rampant, and the harsh but empty measures against it only served to further divide the populace. Members of the government were filled with suspicion against one another. In an attempt to resolve the situation, the podestà was given absolute power. Financial problems were also grave; fines, confiscations, and a state lottery were instituted to try to alleviate the deficit. Moreover, Guelph aristocrats continued to be regularly elected over the Ghibellines, and began to make the Republic far less democratic. Carlo Gonzaga, Captain of the People, lived luxuriously as an autocrat with his will as law. He was supported by Giovanni Appiani and Giovanni Ossona, tradesmen-turned-politicians, who were prominent in government affairs. Gonzaga began replacing his officials with his unambitious supporters, and the Ghibellines saw the ideals of their Republic crumbling before their eyes. Lampugnano and his Ghibelline friends conspired against Gonzaga and the Guelph regime, but were exposed by a letter intercepted by Gonzaga from Lampugnano to his friend Bossi. Gonzaga kept this knowledge secret, knowing that Lampugnano and Bossi were two of the most influential citizens since the formation of the Republic, but with the support of the vengeful Guelph Captains and Defenders conspired to have them slain. Lampugnano and Bossi were sent as envoys to Frederick III in February 1449, but on the road were caught and imprisoned. Lampugnano was beheaded without a trial, and Bossi was tortured until he gave the names of his fellow conspirators. Following the execution of the leaders there was a massacre of leading Ghibellines within the city, from which only a few, such as Vitaliano Borromeo, escaped to safety in Arona, Piedmont and elsewhere. The heads of the slain were placed upon pikes in the Piazza of the Broletto.

Meanwhile, the other claimants to the Duchy began to see that Sforza would be a greater threat than the Ambrosian Republic. Louis of Savoy invaded in spring of 1449, and Sforza sent Colleoni (who had earlier defected) to defeat him at Borgomanero, leading to an uneasy peace. Sforza also faced treachery within his own ranks, added with the fact that he rashly accepted the defection of his great enemies the Piccinino brothers, who, upon gaining access to Monza, promptly returned it to Milan.

Lampugnano, unfortunately for the Guelphs, was considered a martyr for the Republic. This was made worse by the fact that the Guelphs in leadership refused to run elections in April, until in June they were forced by the populace. Ghibelline families took the reins of Milan in this election, and the Guelphs were defeated. However, the reprisals against the Guelphs, including the imprisonment of Appiani and Ossona who had been blamed (probably unjustly) for the massacre, led the populace to violently depose the Ghibellines and reinstall the extremist Guelphs. Gonzaga, however, whose friend Galeotto Toscano was killed in the uprising, departed Milan for Crema, hoping to make peace with Sforza.

=== End of the Republic ===
Sforza was coming close to Milan itself in his conquests, and decided that since it was too powerful to be taken by force, he would surround it and starve the populace into surrender. With the loss of the outer cities by conquest or defection, Milan experienced famine. Gonzaga offered Crema to Sforza, hoping he would be tempted to take it himself and betray the Venetians. But Sforza remained staunch, and instead offered Gonzaga the city of Tortona if he would abandon Crema. This was accepted, and Crema, without support, quickly capitulated.

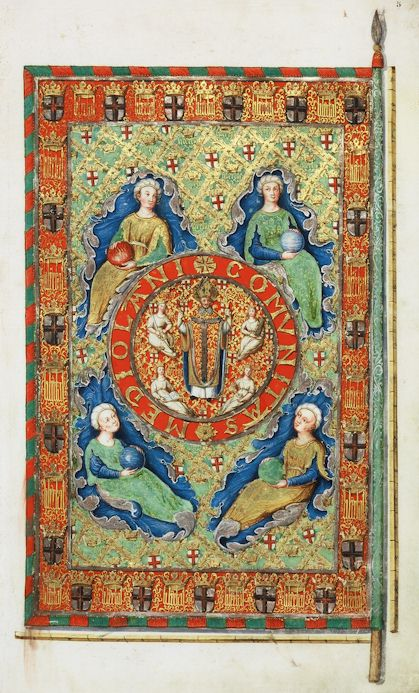
A flag made for the Golden Ambrosian Republic, showing St. Ambrose surrounded by the virtues.

To the Milanese, Sforza's victory now seemed certain, but he found his Venetian allies beginning to have doubts about their Captain-General. They decided that Milan run by Sforza would be far more dangerous and detrimental to their interests than if it were run by a weak Republic. The last of the territory claimed by Venice, namely Crema, was now captured. Venice went behind Sforza's back and signed a peace treaty with the Republic. They conceded conquered land to the Republic in return for peace, and let Sforza keep only Pavia, Cremona, Piacenza, and a narrow strip of land. They ordered him to accept the treaty or find Venice his enemy. The Republic rejoiced, and the citizens were confident the war was over and their future was secured. But Sforza could not accept the conditions of the treaty, and decided to persevere in the struggle. He was already very powerful, and moreover was close to Milan. The Milanese in their assurance of peace had nearly exhausted their resources to plant crops and return to the old way of life. He was confident that Milan would quickly fall to him. After reinforcing his peace with Savoy with the concession of a few unimportant castles, he defeated the Venetians under his rival Sigismondo Malatesta and continued the siege.

Sforza chose for his headquarters the Borromeo castle of Peschiera, south-east of the city. Starvation and suffering were rampant in Milan, and the Venetians had sent an ambassador, Leonardo Venieri, to negotiate the city's surrender and help them defeat Sforza. At last, Gaspare da Vimercate and several members of the Stampa family engineered a coup on 24 February 1450, which resulted in the murder of Venieri on the stairs of Palazzo Reale. The next day the citizens met and Gaspare Da Vimercate convinced the people to surrender to Sforza. Sforza had made himself very popular for his generosity while fighting for Milan. He had abstained from ravaging the countryside as was so common among commanders of his day, and after some debate the public was convinced. The following day terms were offered to Sforza, who accepted them. Sforza earned the city's devotion by distributing food to the starving people. On 22 March 1450, he had himself declared capitano del popolo, and by right of his wife, the Duke of Milan. He secured his popular support by letting many office-holders keep their positions and being very lenient in his reprisals. The leaders were briefly imprisoned or relegated to their estates, but were generally pardoned soon after, even knighting some of his old enemies at his coronation. Ghibellines were allowed to return in safety and were restored to favor.

=== Aftermath ===
Sforza remained at war with Venice for years after the downfall of the Ambrosian Republic. Venice allied herself with the Kingdom of Naples, whose king (Alfonso V) was previously a contender for the succession of Milan. Sforza, however, allied himself with his friend, Cosimo de' Medici of Florence against Venice and Aragonese Naples. The continued war was finally concluded by the peace of Lodi in 1454 with the House of Sforza established as the rulers of the Duchy of Milan

During its three-year existence, the Ambrosian Republic won two major battles. The Lombards defeated the French at the Battle of Bosco Marengo in 1447 and the Venetians at the Battle of Caravaggio in 1448. It was those victories that assured the Republic all the territory of the former Duchy.

Of the Republic, Niccolò Machiavelli remarked

In order to create a Republic in Milan it would be necessary to exterminate all the nobility. . . . For there are, among the nobles, so many exalted personages that the laws do not suffice to repress them, and they must needs be kept under by a living voice and a royal power.

— Machiavelli, Discorso sulla riforma dello stato di Firenze

== First capitani e defensori ==
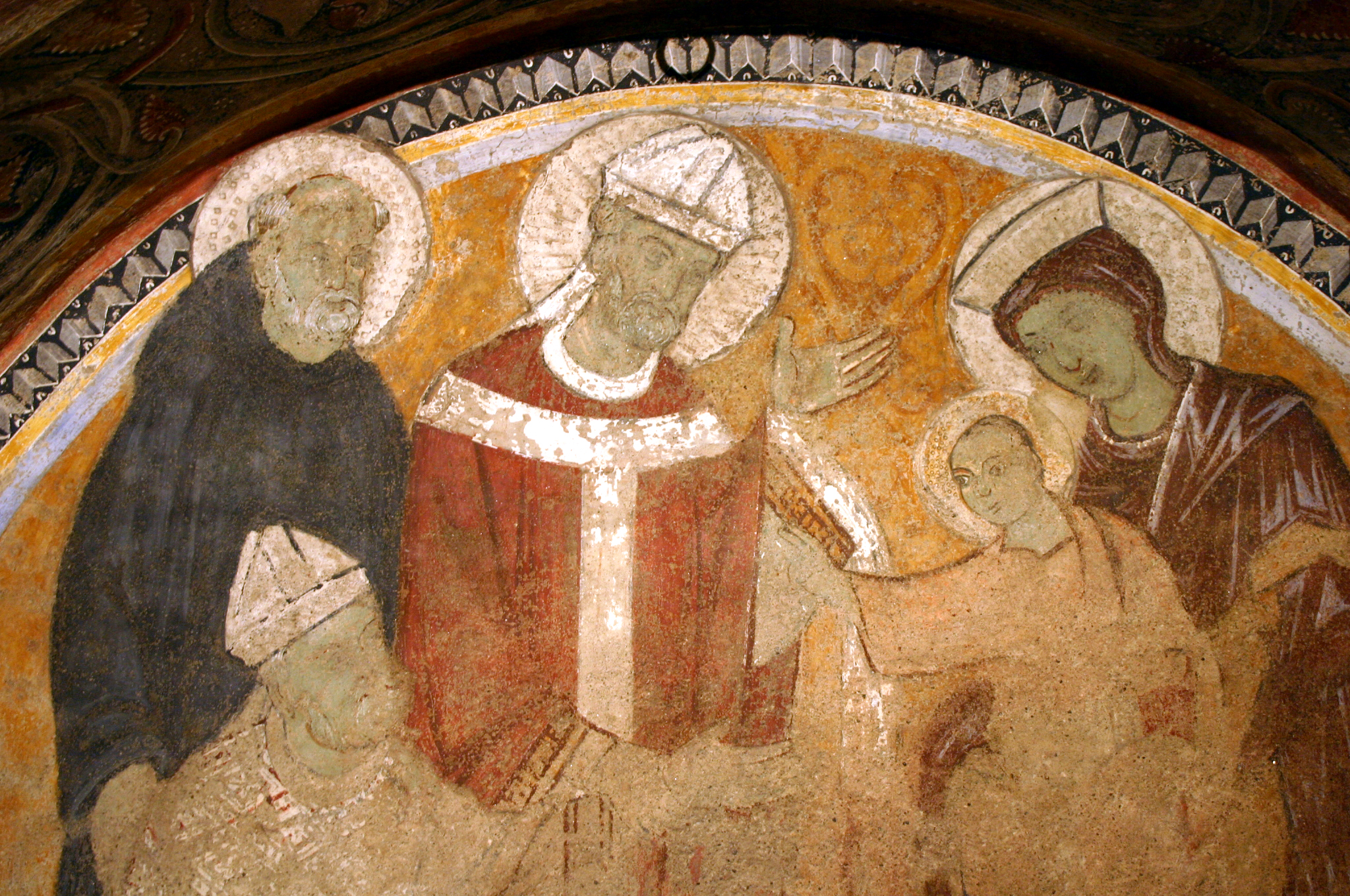
St. Ambrose as depicted on a tomb.

The leading magistrates of the city, the capitani e defensori ("Captains and Defenders"), were in charge of the government, elected every six months beginning in August 1447. They originally numbered twenty-four but were eventually reduced to twelve.

=== Porta Orientale ===
- Giovanni Marliani
- Giovanni Moresini
- Rolando or Oldrado Lampugnani
- Giovanni Olgiati

=== Porta Romana ===
- Bartolomeo Visconti
- Giovanni Omodei
- Giacomello Trivulzio
- Antonio Visconti, perhaps Antonio Trivulzi

=== Porta Ticinese ===
- Giorgio Piatti
- Giovanni Crotti
- Ambrogio Lomazzo
- Giovanni Caimi

=== Porta Vercellina ===
- Vitaliano Borromeo
- Guarnerio Castiglione
- Giacomo Coiro
- Simone Meraviglia

=== Porta Comasina ===
- Giacomo Dugnani
- Giorgio Lampugnani
- Luisino or Luigi Bossi
- Francesco Casati

=== Porta Nuova ===
- Bartolomeo Morone
- Pietro Cotta
- Dionigi Biglia
- Galeotto Toscani
