= Giorgio Lampugnano =

Giorgio Lampugnano was a university professor of Pavia, husband of one Giovannina Omodei and father of the Ambrosian Republic.

Lampugnano was the figurehead of the original four founders of the Ambrosian Republic, an inspiring public speaker. Lampugnano and his father-in-law Giovanni Omodei were among the first Captains and Defenders. He was an active Ghibelline and stirred the populace to protest against peace talks with Venice in 1448 after the Guelphic triumph in the election.

When Carlo Gonzaga gained too much power for his firm republican tastes, he organized the Ghibellines into a pro-Francesco Sforza conspiracy against him, but they were betrayed. On the way to the Holy Roman Empire as an embassy, Lampugnano and his friend and fellow conspirator Teodoro Bossi were captured and imprisoned. Lampugnano was beheaded without a trial, and Bossi was tortured until he gave the names of his accomplices, all of whom either escaped or were murdered. His relative, Oldrado Lampugnano, was elected to the Captains and Defenders in the Ghibelline triumph and later became a member of Francesco Sforza's Secret Council.
