= Duchy of Milan =

Former duchy in Italy (1395–1447; 1450–1796)

Duchy of Milan Ducatus Mediolani (Latin) Ducato di Milano (Italian) Ducaa de Milan (Lombard)
- 1395–1447; 1450–1796
- Flag Coat of arms (1395–1535)

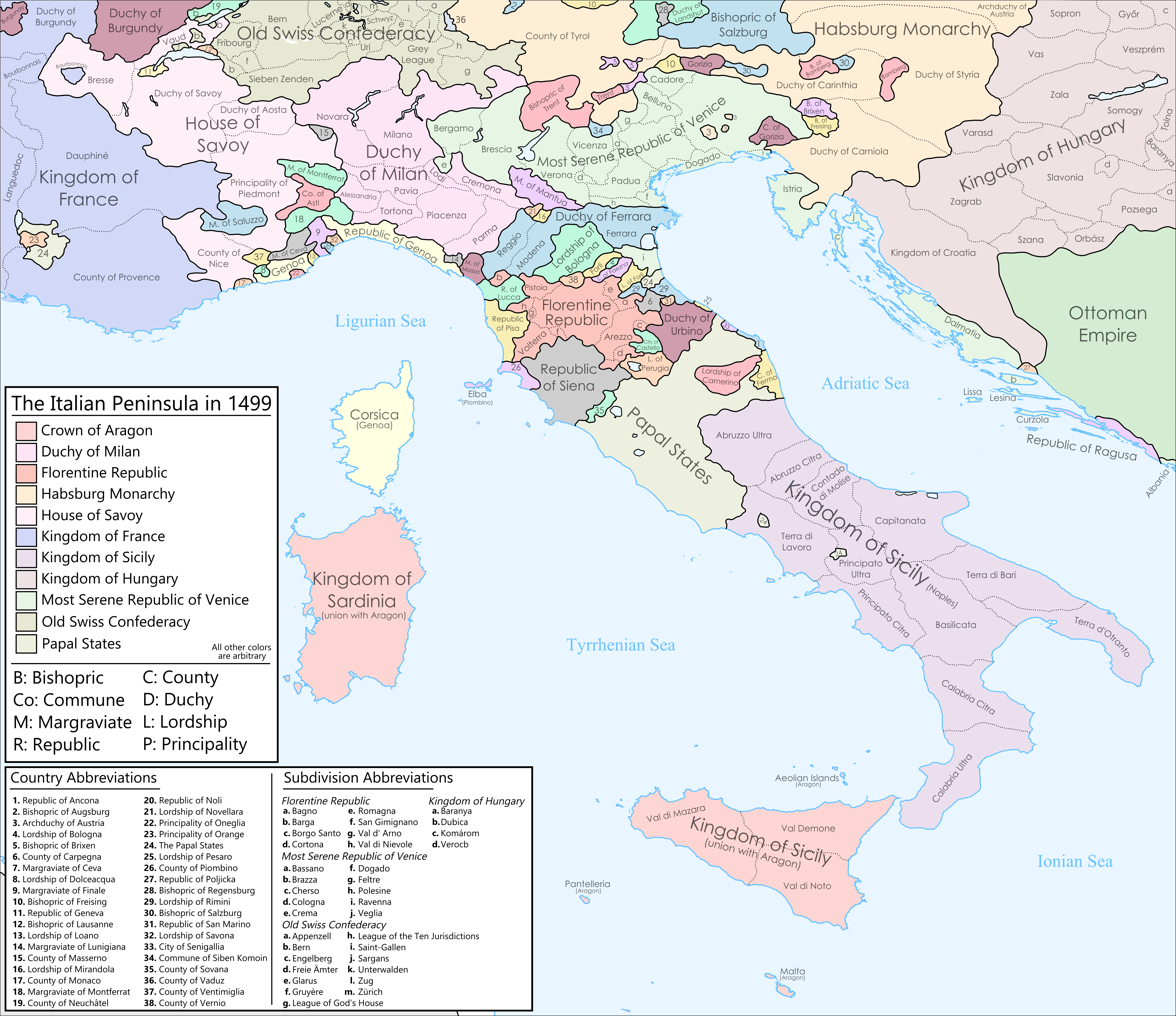
- Duchy of Milan in 1499

- The Duchy of Milan in its period of greatest expansion, between the end of the 14th century and the beginning of the 15th century.
- Capital: Milan
- Common languages: Lombard; Italian
- Religion: Roman Catholicism
- Demonym: Milanese
- Government: Hereditary monarchy
- Duke
  - 1395–1402: Gian Galeazzo Visconti (first)
  - 1792–1796: Francis II (last)
- Historical era: Early modern
  - Imperial diploma of Wenceslaus of Bohemia: 1 May 1395
  - Ambrosian Republic: 1447–1450
  - French occupation: 1499–1512, 1515–1521 and 1524–1525
  - Protectorate of the Swiss Confederacy: 1512–1515
  - Habsburg rule: 1535–1796
  - Spanish rule: 1556–1707
  - Austrian rule: 1707–1796
  - Annexation to the Transpadane Republic: 15 November 1796

Population
  - Estimate: 1,328,000 (1600)
- Currency: Milanese scudo, lira and soldo
Preceded by
1395: Lordship of Milan
1450: Golden Ambrosian Republic
Succeeded by
1447: Golden Ambrosian Republic
1500: Old Swiss Confederacy
1796: Transpadane Republic
- Today part of: Italy; Switzerland

The Duchy of Milan (Italian: Ducato di Milano; Lombard: Ducaa de Milan) was a state in Northern Italy, created in 1395 by Gian Galeazzo Visconti, then the lord of Milan, and a member of the important Visconti family, which had ruled the city since 1277. At that time, it included twenty-six towns and the wide rural area of the middle Padan Plain east of the hills of Montferrat. During much of its existence, it was wedged between Savoy to the west, Republic of Venice to the east, the Swiss Confederacy to the north, and separated from the Mediterranean by the Republic of Genoa to the south. The duchy was at its largest at the beginning of the 15th century, at which time it included almost all of what is now Lombardy and parts of what are now Piedmont, Veneto, Tuscany, and Emilia-Romagna.

Under the House of Sforza, Milan experienced a period of great prosperity with the introduction of the silk industry, becoming one of the wealthiest states during the Renaissance. From the late 15th century, the Duchy of Milan was contested between the forces of the Habsburg Monarchy and the Kingdom of France. It was ruled by Habsburg Spain from 1556 and it passed to Habsburg Austria in 1707 during the War of the Spanish Succession. The duchy remained an Austrian possession until 1796 when a French army under Napoleon Bonaparte captured it in the War of the First Coalition, and it ceased to exist a year later as a result of the Treaty of Campo Formio, when Austria ceded it to the new Cisalpine Republic.

After the defeat of Napoleonic France, the Congress of Vienna of 1815 restored many other Italian States which he had dissolved, but not the Duchy of Milan. Instead, its former territory became part of the Kingdom of Lombardy–Venetia, with the Emperor of Austria as its king. In 1859, Lombardy was ceded to the Kingdom of Piedmont-Sardinia, which became the new Kingdom of Italy in 1861.

== History ==
=== Background ===
The Viscontis' dominions in the 14th century, before the foundation of the Duchy of Milan

The fate of the city of Milan was intertwined since the 13th century with that of the Visconti family, who resumed the policy of territorial expansionism inherited from the city's municipality. One of the first Visconti exponents to lead the Lombard city was Ottone Visconti, elected archbishop in 1262 and who defeated the Della Torre family in the Battle of Desio in 1277.

In the first half of the following century, his nephews and great-grandsons who came to govern Milan: Matteo I, Galeazzo I, Azzone and the Archbishop Giovanni, expanding the area of Visconti influence over the surrounding regions. An equal policy of enlargement and consolidation was pursued in the second half of the century by their successors: Matteo II, Bernabò and Gian Galeazzo. After a period marked by tensions between the various members of the powerful family, Gian Galeazzo Visconti, nephew of Bernabò, came to power with a coup in 1385 and gradually unified the vast family domains scattered across Northern Italy. It is said that the territories subject to his dominion earned Gian Galeazzo in one year, in addition to the ordinary income of 1,200,000 gold florins, another 800,000 in extraordinary subsidies.

=== Visconti rule (1395–1447) ===
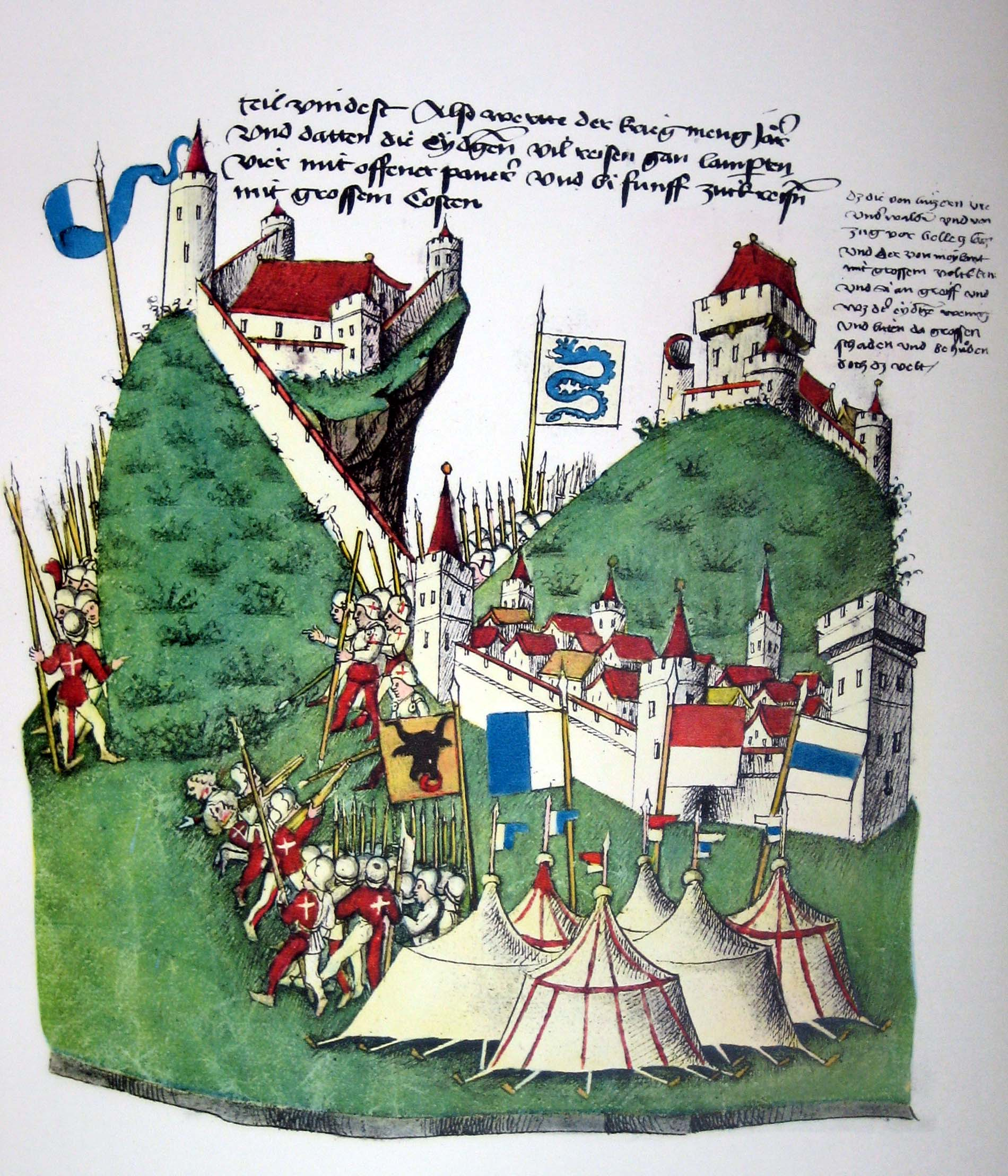
The 1422 Battle of Arbedo for control over Bellinzona

The duchy was officially established on 11 May 1395, when Gian Galeazzo Visconti, the Dominus Generalis of Milan, obtained the title of Duke of Milan by means of a diploma signed in Prague by Wenceslaus of Bohemia. The nomination was ratified and celebrated in Milan on 5 September 1395. Gian Galeazzo Visconti also obtained the license to quarter the Visconti's biscione with the imperial eagle in the new ducal flag.

The duchy, as defined in the diploma of 1395, included the territory surrounding Milan, between the Adda and Ticino rivers, but the dominions of Gian Galeazzo Visconti extended beyond, including 26 towns and spanned from Piedmont to Veneto and from present-day Canton of Ticino to Umbria. Milan thus became one of the five major states of the Italian peninsula in the 15th century. The House of Visconti had been expanding their dominions for nearly a century, under the reigns of Azzone Visconti, Luchino Visconti, Giovanni Visconti, Bernabò Visconti and Gian Galeazzo Visconti: during the rule of Azzone Visconti, the Ossola in Piedmont had been conquered in 1331, followed by Bergamo and Pavia (Lombardy) and Novara (Piedmont) in 1332, Pontremoli (Tuscany) in 1333, Vercelli (Piedmont) and Cremona (Lombardy) in 1334, the Lombard cities of Como, Crema, Lodi and the Valtellina in 1335, Bormio (Lombardy) and Piacenza (Emilia) in 1336, and Brescia and the Val Camonica in 1337.

The brothers Luchino and Giovanni Visconti added Bellinzona (present-day Switzerland in 1342, Parma (Emilia) in 1346 and several territories in southwestern Piedmont in 1347: Tortona, Alessandria, Asti, and Mondovì. Bernabò conquered Reggio Emilia in 1371 and Riva del Garda in 1380, and Gian Galeazzo greatly expanded Milan's dominions, first eastwards, with the conquest of the Venetian cities of Verona (1387), Vicenza (1387), Feltre (1388), Belluno (1388) and Padua (briefly, from 1388 to 1390), and later southwards, conquering Lucca, Pisa and Siena in Tuscany in 1399, Perugia in Umbria in 1400, Bologna in Emilia in 1402, and Assisi in Umbria also in 1402.

=== Ambrosian Republic (1447–1450) ===
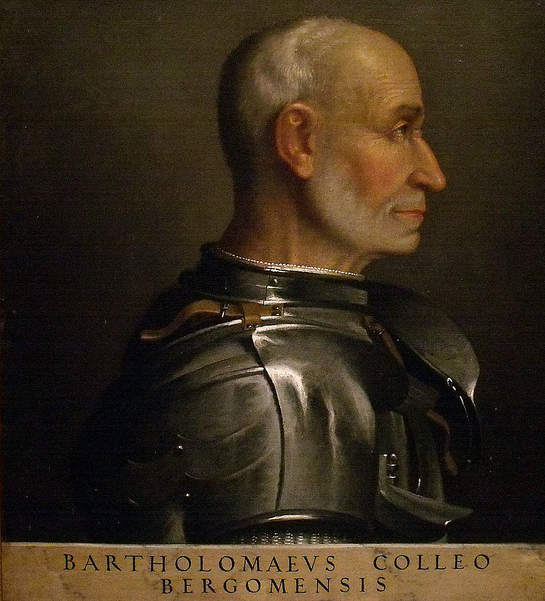
Bartolomeo Colleoni the condottiere of the Golden Ambrosian Republic notably at the battle of Bosco Marengo

When the last Visconti duke, Filippo Maria, died in 1447 without a male heir, the Milanese declared the so-called Golden Ambrosian Republic, which soon faced revolts and attacks from its neighbors. In 1450 mercenary captain Francesco Sforza, having previously married Filippo Maria Visconti's illegitimate daughter Bianca Maria, conquered the city and restored the duchy, founding the House of Sforza.

=== First Sforza's rule (1450–1499) ===
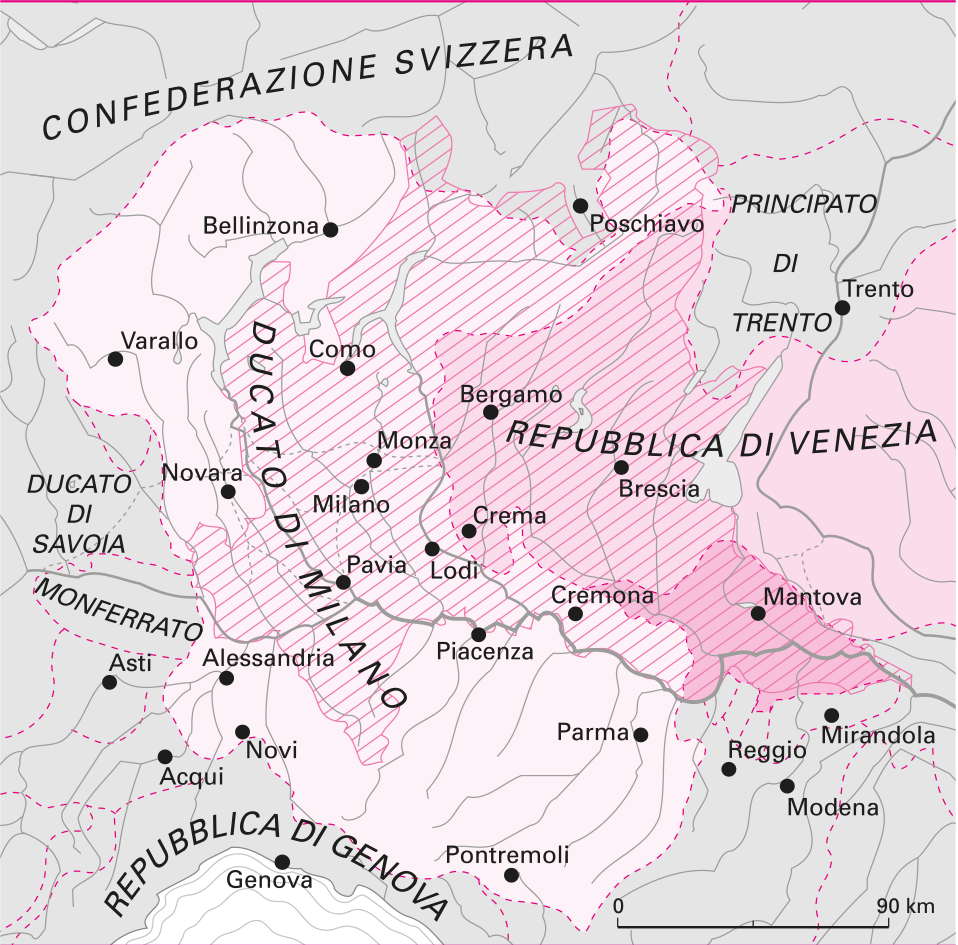
Map of Lombardy after the Peace of Lodi

The Venetian republic had not abandoned its desire to expand into Lombardy and therefore entered into an alliance with Alfonso V of Aragon, King of Naples, and with Emperor Frederick III, against Francesco I Sforza and his allies. The fall of Constantinople, conquered by the Ottoman Turks, however, endangered the structure of the Venetian possessions in the Aegean Sea and after 4 years of war the Peace of Lodi was signed in 1454. With this document Francesco Sforza and Alfonso of Aragon were recognized respectively as Duke of Milan and King of Naples, the Republic of Venice extended its dominion up to the Adda and the Holy Italian League against the Turks was concluded.

The political balance achieved with the Peace of Lodi lasted until the death of Lorenzo de' Medici, ruler of the Florentine Republic, and the incursion of King Charles VIII of France into Italy in 1494, except for some Swiss incursions which resulted in the Peace of Lucerne. Galeazzo Maria, son of Francesco Sforza, due to his government being considered by many to be tyrannical, was murdered in a conspiracy. His son, Gian Galeazzo, governed under the regency of his mother Bona of Savoy, until his uncle, Ludovico il Moro usurped the throne of the duchy. Ludovico il Moro, son of Francesco Sforza, managed to obtain the guardianship of his nephew Gian Galeazzo and confine him to the Visconti Castle of Pavia, where in 1494 he died in such mysterious circumstances that many suspicions gathered around Ludovico himself.

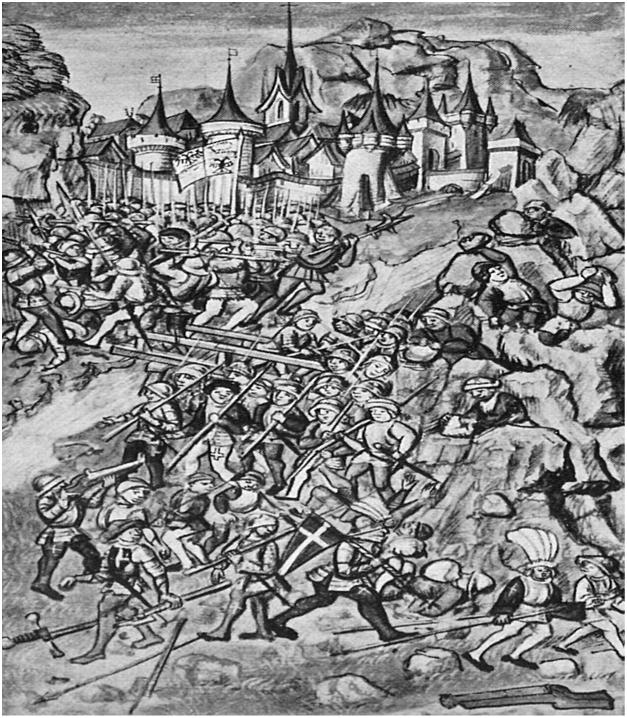
The battle of Crevola 1487 securing the Val d'Ossola

Relations between Ludovico and Ferdinand II of Aragon therefore deteriorated: Gian Galeazzo had in fact married a niece of the King of Naples, who took the side of the legitimate heir. Ludovico il Moro responded by encouraging King Charles VIII of France to reclaim the Kingdom of Naples, as until 1442 the Neapolitan throne had belonged to Charles ancestors, the Capetian House of Anjou. In 1494, Charles VIII conquered Naples, upsetting the balance between the various Italian states and starting the Italian Wars.

=== First French rule (1499–1512) ===
In 1495, Charles VIII was expelled from the Peninsula by a League composed of many Italian states, the Holy Roman Empire, the Spanish Empire and the Kingdom of England. Only three years later, in 1498, the Duke of Orléans, who had become King of France under the name of Louis XII, asserted his claims on the Duchy of Milan: one of his ancestors, Louis of Orleans, had in fact married Valentina Visconti, daughter of Duke Gian Galeazzo, in 1389, whose marriage contract established that, in the event of the extinction of the Visconti dynasty, the title of Duke of Milan would go to Valentina's descendants. Louis XII, claiming to be the legitimate heir of the Viscontis, invaded the Milanese state in 1499, driving out Ludovico il Moro. The former Sforza ruler tried in vain to counter the transalpine troops, even asking the Emperor for help, but only managed to briefly recapture the capital and a few other lands. Defeated and taken prisoner in Novara in 1500, he was deported to France, to the Castle of Loches, where he died on 27 May 1508.

=== Second Sforza's rule (1512–1515) ===
Louis XII remained Duke of Milan until 1512, when the Swiss army expelled the French from Lombardy and placed Maximilian Sforza, son of Ludovico il Moro, on the Milanese throne. Between 1512 and 1515, the Swiss cantons de facto controlled the duchy.

=== Second French rule (1515–1521) ===
Under the reign of King Francis I, the French Crown managed to re-establish its sovereignty over the Milanese duchy. In 1515, after the bloody Battle of Marignano, which saw the defeat of the Swiss army, the French sovereign deposed Maximilian and installed himself on the ducal throne. Despite the defeat, the Swiss managed to retain the territories along the road that leads from the Gotthard Pass to the gates of Como (today's Canton of Ticino). The Treaty of Noyon of 1516 confirmed the possession of the Duchy of Milan to the French. Francis I governed the duchy until 1521 when Charles V, King of Spain and Holy Roman Emperor, conquered it after the Battle of Vaprio d'Adda and raised Maximilian's young brother, Francesco II Sforza, to the ducal throne.

=== Third and last Sforza's rule (1521–1535) ===
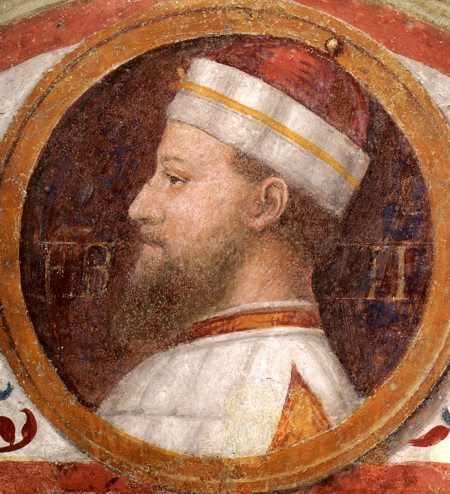
Francesco II, the last Sforza that ruled the Duchy

The French briefly retook the city in late 1524 but lost it again after their decisive defeat in the Battle of Pavia on 24 February 1525, which left the forces of Emperor Charles V in a strong position within the Italian peninsula. Francesco II Sforza then joined the Republic of Venice, the Florentine Republic, Pope Clement VII and the Kingdom of France in the League of Cognac against Charles.

Shortly thereafter the War of the League of Cognac broke out. Fighting erupted in Lombardy between League forces and Imperial forces under Antonio de Leyva, Alfonso del Guasto and Charles III, Duke of Bourbon. At the outset, the Imperial forces besieged Sforza in the castle of Milan. Although League forces attempted to relieve Milan, the Duke of Bourbon arrived with reinforcements on July 5. The League relief army attempted to break the siege lines but failed and on 24 July 1526 the citadel fell to the Imperial forces.

An attempt was made to siege Milan by League forces two months later by Francesco Maria, Duke of Urbino. However by that time, additional reinforcements from Spain and Germany had joined Bourbon’s army and Urbino was forced to lift the siege. Milan continued to be held throughout the war by Imperial forces and was returned to Sforza and the Milanese only after both side sought peace and agreed to negotiations which resulted in the Treaty of Cambrai whereby France officially abandoned their claims to their Italian territories, including Milan and Naples.

As part of the treaty, Charles also agreed to allow Sforza to be reinstated as the Duke of Milan until his death in exchange for concessions from Venice. Charles was also influenced by the fact that he did not want to clash with the Venetians, and he knew he didn't have the means to succeed, as the Venetians were concerned that Milan not fall into the hands of foreigners powers, given that they did not consider themselves "capable of occupying it nor proportionate to be able to hold it".

Francesco II Sforza died without heirs in 1535, opening a new question for the succession to the throne. In this period, to be precise in 1532, Francesco II Sforza requested and obtained from Pope Clement VII the elevation of Vigevano, a city to which his family had always been deeply linked, to the capital of Vigevanasco, after it had obtained in 1530 the title of city and bishopric according to the same methods.

=== Spanish Habsburg rule (1556–1707) ===
King Francis of France and Charles V, Holy Roman Emperor both claimed the duchy by making war. The latter, claiming it as an imperial fief upon the extinction of the Sforza, obtained control of the duchy and installed his son Philip II there with an imperial diploma signed in Brussels on 11 October 1540 and made public in 1554. Philip's possession of the duchy was finally recognized by King Henry II of France in 1559, with the Treaty of Cateau-Cambrésis. The duchy, having lost all forms of independence, was then reduced to a regional state subjected to foreign domination.

Under the Spanish viceroys from 1535, Milan became one of the contributors to the Spanish king's army. At the time Lombardy had the most developed manufacturing and commercial economy anywhere in the world, making it a valuable tool for the Spanish military: an armory of paramount strategic importance.[43] In addition to resources, Milan also provided soldiers. During the Franco-Spanish War (1635–1659), Milan sent and paid for on average 4,000 soldiers per year (and over 100,000 in total) to the Spanish crown, with many of these men serving in the Low Countries against the Dutch States Army.[44]

=== Austrian Habsburg rule (1714–1796) ===
With the Treaty of Baden, which ended the War of the Spanish Succession, the Duchy of Milan was ceded to the Austrian Habsburgs. During the 18th century, the surface area of the duchy—despite its unification in 1745 with the Duchy of Mantua, which had strong autonomy from Milan—was further reduced, reaching a much smaller extension than present-day Lombardy. The government of the Habsburgs of Austria was characterized by significant administrative reforms, which the sovereigns of the Austrian house—inspired by the principles of enlightened absolutism—also introduced in their Lombard territories: for example, the rearrangement of the land register, the suppression of ecclesiastical censorship and the development of the silk industry.

=== End of the Duchy ===
Following Napoleon Bonaparte's victorious campaign in northern Italy in 1796, the duchy, entrusted to an interim government junta, was ceded to the French Republic by the Habsburgs with the Treaty of Campo Formio in 1797. Already in 1796, the French had established the vassal state of the Transpadane Republic on the territories of the Duchy of Milan, which merged with the Cispadane Republic in 1797 to form the Cisalpine Republic, of which Milan became the capital. After the defeat of Napoleon, on the basis of the decisions taken by the Congress of Vienna on 9 June 1815, the Duchy of Milan was not restored but became part of the Kingdom of Lombardy–Venetia, a constituent land of the Austrian Empire. The kingdom ceased to exist when the remaining portion of it was annexed to the Kingdom of Italy in 1866.

== Historical coat of arms ==
Coat of arms

1395–1535
(Under the Visconti and Sforza dynasties)

1580–1700
(Under Spanish Habsburgs)

1707–1796
(Under Austrian Habsburgs)

== See also ==
- Insubria

== Sources ==
- Black, Jane (2009). Absolutism in Renaissance Milan: Plenitude of Power Under the Visconti and the Sforza 1329-1535. Oxford; New York: Oxford University Press. ISBN 978-0-19-956529-0. OCLC 368048357.
- Bueno de Mesquita, Daniel Meredith (1941). Giangaleazzo Visconti, Duke of Milan (1351-1402): A Study in the Political Career of an Italian Despot. Cambridge: Cambridge University Press.
- Chamberlin, E. R. (1965). The Count of Virtue, Giangaleazzo Visconti, Duke of Milan. London: Eyre & Spottiswoode.
