= Skjalm Hvide =

Earl of Zealand in Denmark in the end of the Viking Age

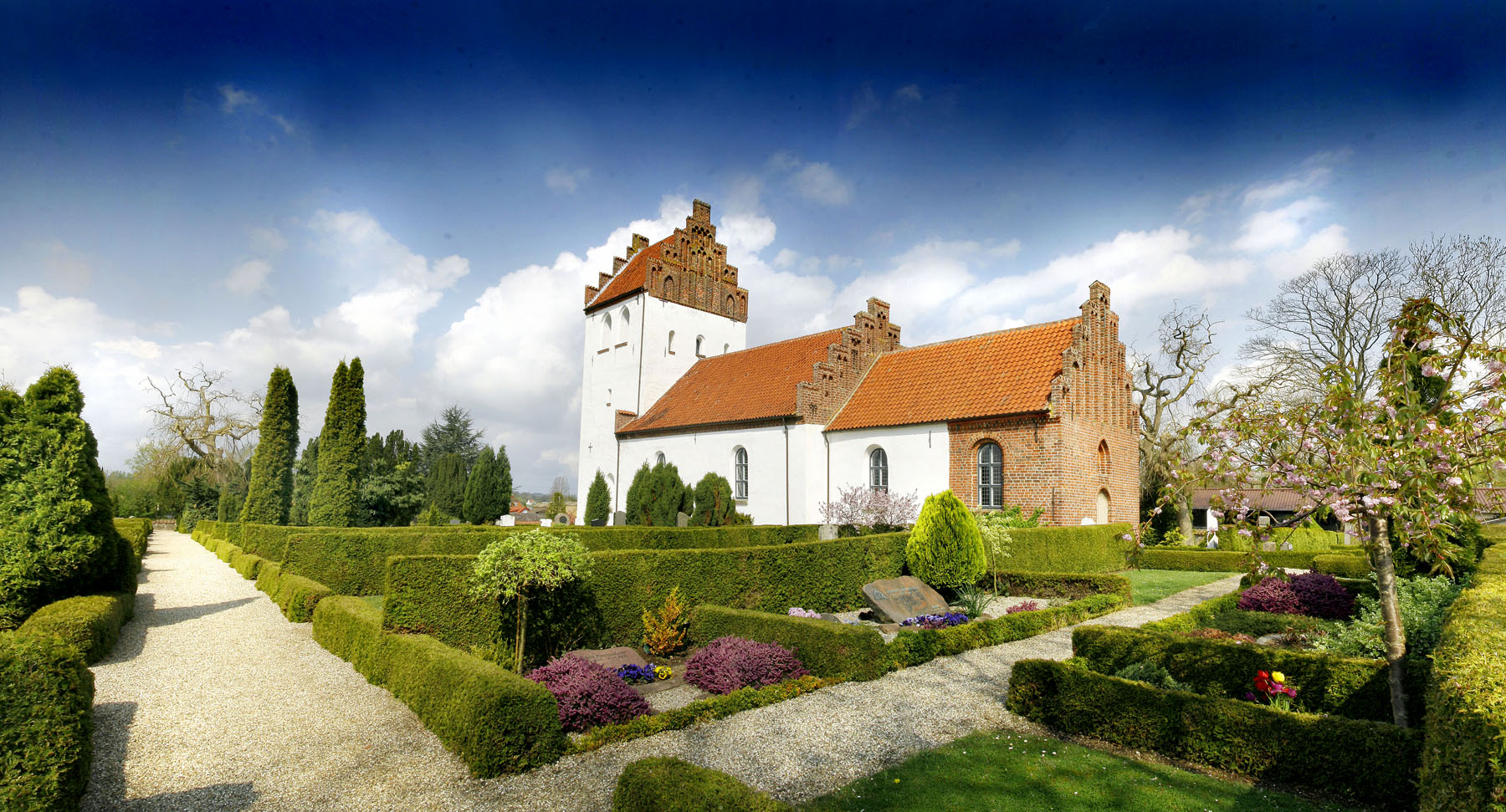
Jørlunde Church (Jørlunde Kirke) was founded and erected by Skjalm Hvide in c. 1085.

Skjalm Hvide (before 1045 – c. 1113), was the Earl of Zealand in Denmark in the end of the Viking Age (793–1066) and up to his death. Skjalm's father was Toke Trylle, whose father was Slag (or Slau, or he may have been called by both names), based on Absalon, a medieval account scanned, translated and published by Google.

Skjalm Hvide was very rich. He was one of the most influential and powerful chiefs in Denmark in the Middle Ages, and the most powerful chief of his era, i.e. the late Viking Age, late 11th century and early 12th century. He is regarded as the founder of the Hvide Clan, the name Hvide signifying the color white. During the transition ending the Viking Age and a few centuries ahead, the Hvide clan was a dominant factor in the Danish power politics.

In 1062, on August 9, Skjalm Hvide together with the King Sweyn II of Denmark (c. 1019 – 28 April 1076; reigned in 1047–1076) fought in the Battle of Niså, a naval battle off the coast of Halland, in what today is southwestern Sweden. The enemy were the forces of the Norwegian king Harald Hardrada, who had claimed the Danish throne since 1047, and had launched raids into Denmark ever since then.

With his invasion of Danish territory in 1062, Harald wanted to decisively defeat the Danes, and thus finally be able to conquer Denmark. Skjalm Hvide was captured by Harald's forces, but he later managed to escape. Harald relinquished his claims to Denmark in 1064, in exchange for Sweyn's recognition of Harald as the King Harald III of Norway. Harald then sailed off to England, to claim the crown of England, but – instead – was killed there.

In c. 1085, Skjalm Hvide founded and erected the Jørlunde Church (Jørlunde Kirke), located on the island of Zealand, in Jørlunde, North Zealand. It is one of the earliest and oldest still existing churches in Denmark. The church is richly decorated inside with frescos dating back to the mid-12th century, created by the so-called Jørlunde workshop. The original appearance of the church was first changed by a conversion in c. 1350. Like his father Toke Trylle who was baptized in Christian tradition, Skjalm Hvide was one of the earliest Nordic leaders known to have accepted Christianity as their faith. Thereafter, the Hvide clansmen regularly rose to the highest positions in the Christian clergy, including several as Roman Catholic Archbishops of Lund.

In c. 1100, after his brother had been murdered, Skjalm Hvide with his warriors sailed for a revenge to Rügen, the largest island by area in what today is Germany. Rügen at the time had been used by Wendish pirates as their base. It was perhaps in connection to this expedition of his when Skjalm Hvide made the people of Rügen taxpayers for the Danish crown, of which Saxo Grammaticus has written. After this event, Skjalm Hvide was appointed the bailiff of Rügen by the King Eric I of Denmark. According to Saxo, Skjalm Hvide established peace between the Danes and Wends, and he at one point also ruled the Wends. Based on Saxo's account, Skjalm Hvide was also the bailiff of Zealand, and commanded the King of Denmark's armed forces.

In c. 1102, Skjalm Hvide undertook the task of providing home and care to King of Denmark's eldest and only legitimate son, Canute Lavard, starting from when Canute's parents, the King Eric I of Denmark (Eric I, Eric the Good; Danish: Erik Ejegod, a son of King Sweyn II) and Queen Boedil Thurgotsdatter (both Eric I and Boedil were descendants of King Sweyn I of Denmark) embarked for a pilgrimage to the Holy Land, during which both Eric I and Boedil became ill and died in 1103. Skjalm Hvide hereafter took the responsibility of bringing up Canute Lavard, a mission in which Skjalm's brother Aude provided assistance. Canute's son Valdemar, who became the King Valdemar I of Denmark ("Valdemar the Great"), – in turn – was brought up by Skjalm Hvide's son Asser Rig.

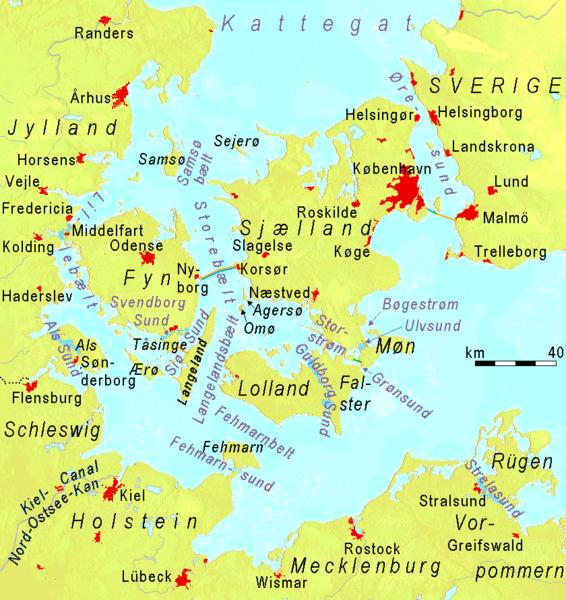
Pictured in the middle is the Danish island of Zealand (Sjælland). Around it are the Danish Straits, which connect the Baltic Sea – on the right – and the Atlantic Ocean. On the top right is Sweden (Sverige). On the bottom is Germany. On the bottom right is the island of Rügen, where Skjalm Hvide attacked in c.1100, after the murder of his brother.

== Skjalm Hvide's stronghold in Zealand ==
During Skjalm Hvide's lifetime and for a long time thereafter, the Hvide Clan was most active and influential on the Danish island of Zealand (Danish: Sjælland), and some of the surrounding areas, including e.g. other Danish islands and Skåne, also known as Scania, in what today is the southernmost province of Sweden.

The Hvide Clan had an important stronghold in and around Jørlunde, North Zealand, where in. c. 1085 Skjalm Hvide erected the Jørlunde Church (Jørlunde Kirke). Today, Jørlunde is a village in the Frederikssund municipality, about 26 km northwest of central Copenhagen, in the Capital Region of Denmark, with a population of 305 as of 1 January 2019. The earliest known written mention of the place-name Jørlunde is in a document from 1085.

In addition to North Zealand, Skåne (Scania) and some other areas, Skjalm Hvide also held large land possessions in and around what nearly five decades after his death, in 1161, was founded as the town of Sorø by Skjalm's grandson Absalon, a son of Asser Rig, in the south-central part of Zealand.

In Sorø, Skjalm Hvide's sons Ebbe Skjalmsen Hvide and Asser Rig (Hvide) in 1140 founded and in 1142 consecrated the Sorø Abbey. It was the preeminent and wealthiest monastic house in all of Denmark during the Middle Ages, which acquired property all over Denmark, with an income larger than that of the royal family. Near Sorø, Ebbe also erected the Bjernede Church, and Asser established a Benedictine House, just a few years before his death in 1151. Asser lived as a monk for the last years of his life.

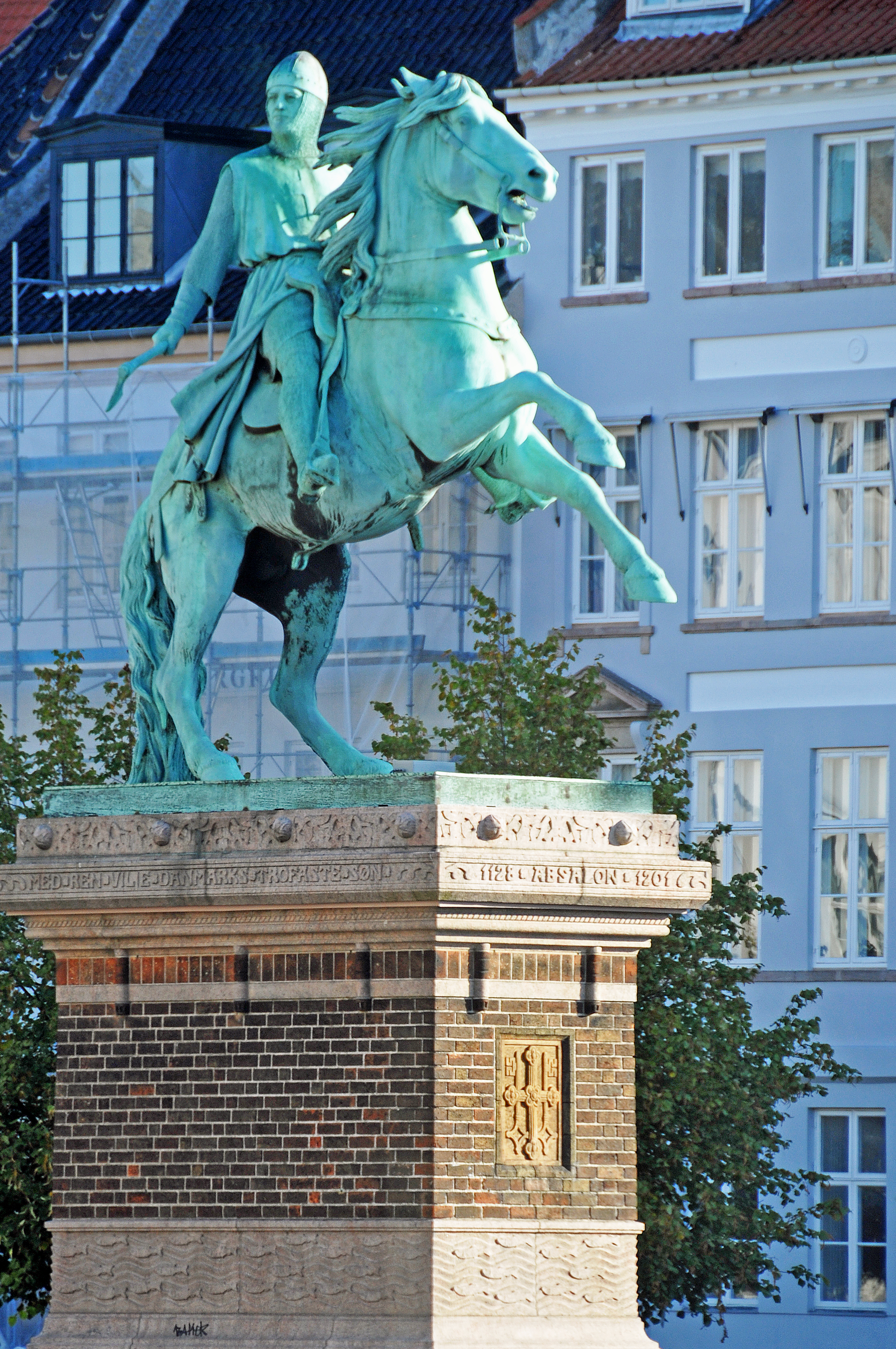
Vilhelm Bissen's equestrian statue of Absalon on Højbro Plads in Copenhagen, facing the Christiansborg Palace, where Absalon's Castle once stood.

In 1161–1201, Asser's son Absalon erected at the Sorø Abbey grounds Sorø Abbey Church, a burial site for four Danish rulers. Around the time he started that work, he also founded what today is the city of Copenhagen. Traditionally, Copenhagen's founding has been dated to Bishop Absalon's erection of the Absalon's Castle on the little island of Slotsholmen in 1167, at the site of the later Copenhagen Castle and where the Christiansborg Palace – the home of the Danish Parliament (Danish: Folketing) – stands today.

The construction of the Absalon's Castle was done in response to the attacks by Wendish pirates who plagued the Danish coastline during the 12th century. Defensive ramparts and moats were also built for the castle, and at the latest by 1177 also the St. Clemens Church had been completed on the same site.

The earliest written mention of Copenhagen, located on the island of Zealand, was in the 12th century when Saxo Grammaticus in Gesta Danorum referred to it as Portus Mercatorum, meaning Merchants' Harbor or – in the Danish of the time – Købmannahavn. In 1186, a letter from Pope Urban III states that the castle of Hafn (Copenhagen) and its surrounding lands, including the town of Hafn, were given to Absalon by King Valdemar I.

Archaeological excavations done in 2018 point to there possibly having been also another church in Copenhagen at the time of the erection of the Absalon's Castle in the 1160s, and – accordingly – Copenhagen possibly having been a bigger town in Absalon's lifetime than previously has been thought. Additionally, around 1200, the Church of Our Lady was constructed on a higher ground of Copenhagen, to the northeast of the town. The town began to further develop around that church.

At 7,031 km^{2}, Zealand is the largest and most populous island not only in today's Denmark proper (thus excluding Greenland and Disko Island, which are larger), but also in the entire Baltic Sea region. Zealand's official population on 1 January 2018 was 2,302,074. Copenhagen, the capital of Denmark, is located partly on the eastern shore of Zealand and partly on the island of Amager. Other cities in Zealand include Roskilde, Hillerød, Næstved and Helsingør.

Especially in the Viking Age (793–1066), but also before it and after, Zealand has often played a critical role in history. This is due to its strategically important location in the center of the narrow waterways known as the Danish Straits, which connect – and provide the only maritime gateway between – the Baltic Sea and the Atlantic Ocean. To be in control of this gateway in the Middle Ages was both a guarantee and sign of enormous power.

== Adam of Bremen on Skjalm Hvide's turf ==
Adam of Bremen (before 1050 – 12 October 1081/1085) was a German monk and chronicler, most famous for his chronicle Gesta Hammaburgensis Ecclesiae Pontificum (Medieval Latin for "Deeds of Bishops of the Hamburg Church"), a historical treatise written in 1073–1076, to which Adam made additions (scholia) until his death. It is one of the most important sources of the medieval history of Northern Europe, and the oldest textual source reporting the discovery of coastal North America. It covers the entire period known as the Viking Age, from the foundation of the bishopric under Saint Willehad (a.k.a. Willihad (Latin: Willehadus/Willihadus); c. 745 – 8 November 789; a Christian missionary and the Bishop of Bremen from 787) in 788 until the rule of the Prince-Bishop Adalbert (c. 1000 – 16 March 1072), who served as the Archbishop of Hamburg and Bishop of Bremen in 1043–1072.

In 1066 or 1067 Adam was invited by Archbishop Adalbert of Hamburg (a.k.a. Adalbert of Bremen; also Adelbert, Albert; c. 1000 – 16 March 1072) to join the Archdiocese of Bremen. He was accepted among the capitulars of Bremen, and by 1069 appeared as the director of the cathedral's school. Soon thereafter he began to write the history of Bremen, Hamburg and the northern lands in his aforementioned study, nicknamed as Gesta.

Adam's position and the missionary activity of the church of Bremen allowed him to gather information on the history and geography of Northern Germany and some of the surrounding areas. On this mission, Adam at some point in 1073–1076 spent time at the royal court of King Sweyn II of Denmark (c. 1019 – 28 April 1076; reigned in 1047–1076), a.k.a. Sweyn II Estridsson. presumably including in Slangerup – a part of which is Jørlunde –, based on the fact that King Sweyn II primarily used as his home the royal estate there and its equivalent in Dalby, near Lund.

The German archbishops of Cologne and Hamburg were at the time competing on which one of the two would succeed on converting the pagan Nordic peoples north of Germany into Christianity, and on which one of the two would get to expand his archdiocese north from Germany. In this contest, and on his time spent in Denmark, Adam of Bremen represented the Archbishop of Hamburg-Bremen. Adam reported of having received a lot of information from King Sweyn II, for whom Adam shows appreciation and respect in his writing. King Sweyn II was a close ally of Skjalm Hvide, including in the Battle of Niså in 1062. Sweyn II's grandson Canute Lavard and great-grandson Valdemar I – a future King of Denmark – were both brought up by Skjalm Hvide and his family.

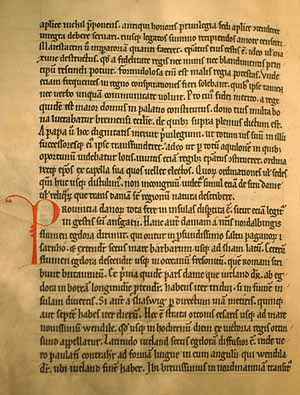
A facsimile of Adam of Bremen's magnum opus. The existence of Adam's Gesta was forgotten in the later medieval era, until it was re-discovered in the late 16th century in the library of Sorø Abbey, founded in 1140 by sons of Skjalm Hvide, Ebbe Skjalmsen (Hvide) and Asser Rig.

The stay of Adam of Bremen at the court of Sweyn II gave Adam the opportunity to gather information about the geography and history of Denmark and other Nordic regions and peoples. Among the things Adam wrote about in Scandinavia were the sailing passages across Øresund – the strait which forms the Danish–Swedish border, separating Zealand (Denmark) from Scania (Sweden) –, such as what today is known as the ferry route from Elsinore to Helsingborg. About Zealand, the home island of Skjalm Hvide, Adam of Bremen also wrote e.g. the following words, which are believed to have been influenced by the earlier Viking raids done in the German home-region of Adam, including the sack of Hamburg by the Danes in 845:

"There is a lot of gold in Zealand [Seland], which has been obtained by looting. These pirates, who call themselves Vikings [wichings], pay the king of the Danes taxes for their right to plunder the barbarians inhabiting the coasts of the sea."

In his account pertaining to the Nordic areas, Descriptio insularum Aquilonis, the book 4 of Adam's "Gesta", published in c. 1076, Adam was the first author known to have written about Vinland, the area of coastal North America explored by the Norse Vikings, where Leif Erikson first landed in c. 1000, approximately five centuries prior to the voyages of Christopher Columbus and John Cabot. According to Adam of Bremen, this information too he had received from King Sweyn II.

The main focus of Gesta was, however, aimed at the history of the Hamburg-Bremen diocese and its bishops. As the jurisdiction of the bishops of the diocese included missions related to the Christianization of Scandinavia, in Gesta Adam reports also of the Norse paganism of the period. The existence of Adam's Gesta was forgotten in the later medieval era, until it was re-discovered in the late 16th century in the library of Sorø Abbey, founded in 1140 by sons of Skjalm Hvide, Ebbe Skjalmsen (Hvide) and Asser Rig, on a land previously owned by Skjalm Hvide.

== Skjalm Hvide's immediate family ==
Skjalm Hvide had at least one brother, Aude, who – in the words of Saxo Grammaticus –"belonged to one of the most distinguished families". Skjalm and his wife Signe Asbjørnsdatter (c. 1050 – c. 1096) gave birth to Asser Rig Skjalmsen Hvide (c. 1078–1151) (a jarl and chieftain); Margrethe Skjalmsdatter Hvide (1073–1162); Cecilie Skjalmsdatter Hvide (c. 1084 – 1161); Toke Skjalmsen Hvide (1085–1145); Sune Skjalmsen Hvide (c. 1086 – c. 1140); and Ebbe Skjalmsen Hvide af Knardrup (c. 1090 – 1151).

Skjalm's son Asser Rig married Inger Eriksdotter (c. 1100–1157), the daughter of Eric, the Jarl of Falster, and Princess Cecilia Knutsdatter, the daughter of King Canute IV of Denmark (c. 1042 – 10 July 1086), the first Danish king (1080–1086) to be canonized, recognized by the Roman Catholic Church as the Patron Saint of Denmark in 1101. Asser and Inger settled to live in Fjenneslev, Zealand, where they erected the Fjenneslev Church (Fjenneslev Kirke) in Sorø.

They gave birth to Absalon (c. 1128 – 21 March 1201), who became the Bishop of Roskilde, Archbishop of Lund, and a powerful warrior leader, government minister and main adviser and ally to two Danish kings. The other two children of Asser and Inger were Esbern Snare (c. 1127–1204) and Ingefred Assersdatter (c. 1130–1160). Absalon's grandfather – Asser's father – Skjalm Hvide was originally buried in Fjenneslev, but was later moved to Sorø Klosterkirke (i.e. the Sorø Abbey Church). At Skjalm's tomb an inscription in a lead-plate, believed to be from the late 12th century, states that Absalon's grandfather Skjalm is here.

Whereas Skjalm Hvide brought up Canute Lavard, the father of Valdemar I, Canute's son Valdemar I was brought up by Skjalm's son Asser. Asser's son Absalon and stepson Valdemar I became great friends. Before the mid-12th century, an era of Danish warfare and expansion broke out, led by Absalon for – and together with – his stepbrother Valdemar I. The unrest was started by a Danish civil war fought in 1146–1157, which led to Valdemar in 1157 being crowned as King Valdemar I of Denmark, a.k.a. Valdemar the Great (reign: 1157–1182). Thereafter, Absalon remained a war commander, minister and chief adviser first to Valdemar I and then – following the death of Valdemar I in 1182 – to his successor, King Canute VI (reign: 1182–1202).

Saint Canute Lavard
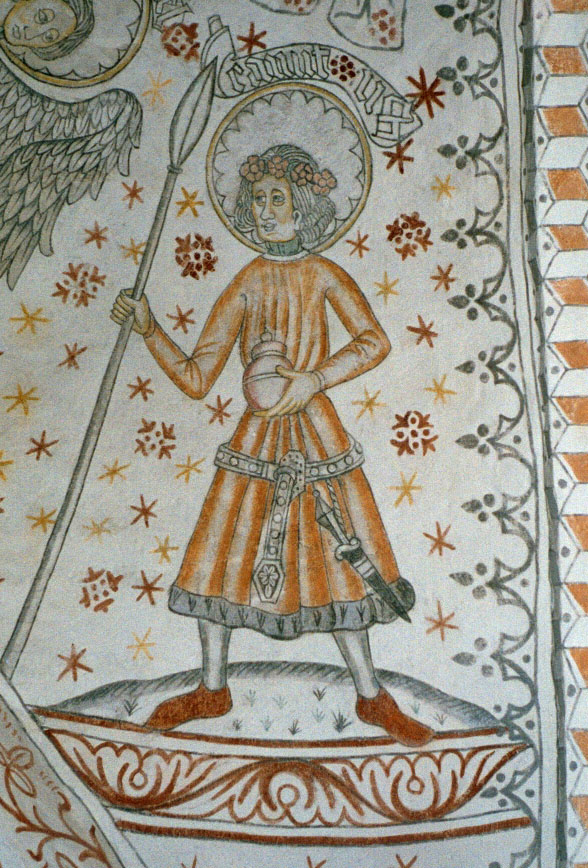
- Canute Lavard in a fresco in Vigersted Church near Ringsted.

Martyr
- Born: 1096; Roskilde, Denmark
- Died: 7 January 1131 forest of Haraldsted near Ringsted in Zealand, Denmark.
- Venerated in: Roman Catholic Church
- Feast: 7 January

After the civil war, Absalon led warring against the Wends, just like his grandfather Skjalm Hvide had done. At Absalon's instigation, Valdemar I declared war upon the Wends, who were raiding the Danish coasts. In 1158, Valdemar I erected the Sønderborg Castle (Valdemar IV of Denmark and Helvig of Schleswig were married there two centuries later) for protection against the Wends and as part of a larger system of fortifications.

In 1175, Valdemar I also erected the Vordingborg Castle as a defensive fortress, and as a base from which to launch raids against the German coast. After the death of Absalon in 1201, Valdemar II (reign: 1202–1241) – the second son of Absalon's stepbrother Valdemar I – led a Danish expedition across the Elbe river to invade Holstein, the region between the rivers Elbe and Eider. Holstein is the southern half of Schleswig-Holstein, which is the northernmost modern-day state of Germany.

== Skjalm Hvide brought up Canute Lavard ==
In c. 1102, Skjalm Hvide undertook the task of providing home and care – in addition to his own biological children – to Canute Lavard (Danish: Knud Lavard) (March 12, 1096 – 7 January 1131). Canute Lavard was the eldest and only legitimate son of King Eric I of Denmark (c. 1055 – 10 July 1103; reigned in 1095–1103) (Eric I, Eric the Good; Danish: Erik Ejegod, a son of King Sweyn II) and Queen Boedil Thurgotsdatter. Both Eric I and Boedil were descendants of King Sweyn I of Denmark.

This mission of Skjalm Hvide began when Canute Lavard's parents, King Eric I and Queen Boedil embarked for a pilgrimage to the Holy Land. On their pilgrimage, both Eric I and Boedil died. On their way to the Holy Land, first Eric I became ill, and on 10 July 1103 died in Paphos, Cyprus. Queen Boedil also became ill, but made it to Jerusalem, where she died that same year.

At the death of his parents, Canute Lavard was seven years old, and – as a minor – he was bypassed as the heir for the throne. Under the care of Skjalm Hvide, and with the assistance of Skjalm's brother Aude, Canute thereafter grew up to become a chivalrous and popular Danish prince. The Hvide family members were his most eager supporters.

Canute became the first Duke of Schleswig and – subsequently – the first so-called border-prince, who was both a Danish and German vassal at the same time, a position leading towards the historical double position of Southern Jutland. Canute was an ancestor of the Valdemarian kings (Valdemarerne) and of their corresponding royal line. He was the father of King Valdemar I of Denmark (14 January 1131 – 12 May 1182) (Valdemar den Store) and grandfather of King Valdemar II of Denmark (Valdemar Sejr). The reign of King Valdemar I saw the rise of Denmark, which reached its zenith under his second son, and successor, King Valdemar II of Denmark.

In 1115, Canute Lavard's uncle, King Niels of Denmark, placed Canute in charge of the Duchy of Schleswig (jarl af Sønderjylland), in order to put an end to the attacks of the Slavic Obotrites. During the next fifteen years, he fulfilled his duty of establishing peace in the border area so well that he was titled Duke of Holstein (Hertug af Holsten) and became a vassal of the Holy Roman Empire.

In 1131, Canute Lavard was killed by his cousin Magnus Nielsen (c. 1106–1134), who saw Canute as a rival to the Danish throne. Canute's murder took place just days before the birth of his son, Valddemar (14 January 1131 – 12 May 1182). Valdemar's mother, Ingeborg of Kiev, daughter of Grand Prince Mstislav I of Kiev and Christina Ingesdotter of Sweden, named the son as Valdemar after her grandfather, Vladimir Monomakh, the Grand Prince of Kiev. Canute Lavard was canonized in 1169 by Pope Alexander III.

== Skjalm Hvide's son brought up Canute's son ==
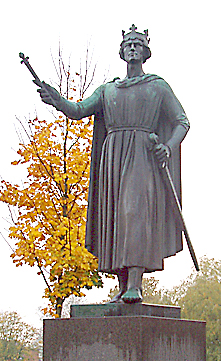
A statue depicting Valdemar the Great (reign: 1154 – 12 May 1182) in the town square of Ringsted in central Zealand.

As Canute Lavard's son, and as an heir to the throne, and with his rivals quickly gaining power, Valdemar (future King Valdemar I of Denmark) too was adopted to the Hvide family, to be brought up in Ringsted, at the court of Skjalm Hvide's son Asser Rig (Hvide). Asser's son Absalon became a great and trusted friend of his new stepbrother, Valdemar, and Valdemar's chief adviser and – later – a minister, powerful war commander, Bishop of the Diocese of Roskilde (1158–1192) and Archbishop of Lund (1178–1201). In 1154, at his coronation, Valdemar became the King Valdemar I of Denmark, also known as Valdemar the Great (Danish: Valdemar den Store). He reigned until his death in 1182.

Before that, in 1146, when Valdemar was only fifteen years old, King Eric III of Denmark abdicated and a Danish civil war erupted. The pretenders to the throne were (1) Sweyn III of Denmark, the son of King Eric II of Denmark and grandson of King Eric I of Denmark; and (2) Canute V of Denmark, the son of Magnus Nielsen and grandson of Niels of Denmark, who succeeded as king his brother Eric I of Denmark; and (3) Valdemar I himself, who held in his possession Jutland – the peninsula of Northern Europe which forms the continental portion of Denmark and part of northern Germany –, but most tightly of it the area of Schleswig, located around the modern-day Danish-German border.

In 1157, the three agreed to divide Denmark in three between themselves. Sweyn III hosted a great banquet for Canute V, Absalon, and Valdemar I, during which he planned to kill all three. Canute V was killed, but Absalon and Valdemar I escaped. Valdemar I at this point returned to Jutland. Sweyn III quickly launched an invasion there, but only to be defeated by Valdemar I in the Battle of Grathe Heath on 23 October 1157. Consequently, Sweyn III was killed during a fight, allegedly by a group of peasants who stumbled upon him as he was fleeing from the battlefield. In total, the Danish civil war had by then lasted over ten years. Valdemar I, now having outlived all his rival pretenders, became the sole King of Denmark.

In 1157, King Valdemar I was married to Sophia of Minsk (c. 1140 – 5 May 1198). In 1158, Absalon was appointed the Bishop of Roskilde (1158–1192), and later the Archbishop of Lund (1178–1201), while all along serving as the chief adviser, war commander and a minister for his stepbrother, the King Valdemar I of Denmark. At Absalon's instigation, Valdemar I declared war upon the Wends, who were raiding the Danish coasts. In 1158, Valdemar I erected the Sønderborg Castle for protection against attacks by the Wends and as part of a larger system of fortifications, and in 1175 the Vordingborg Castle as a defensive fortress, and as a base from which to launch raids against the German coast.

== Skjalm Hvide's sons founded Sorø Abbey ==
Sorø Abbey.
- Sorø Kloster
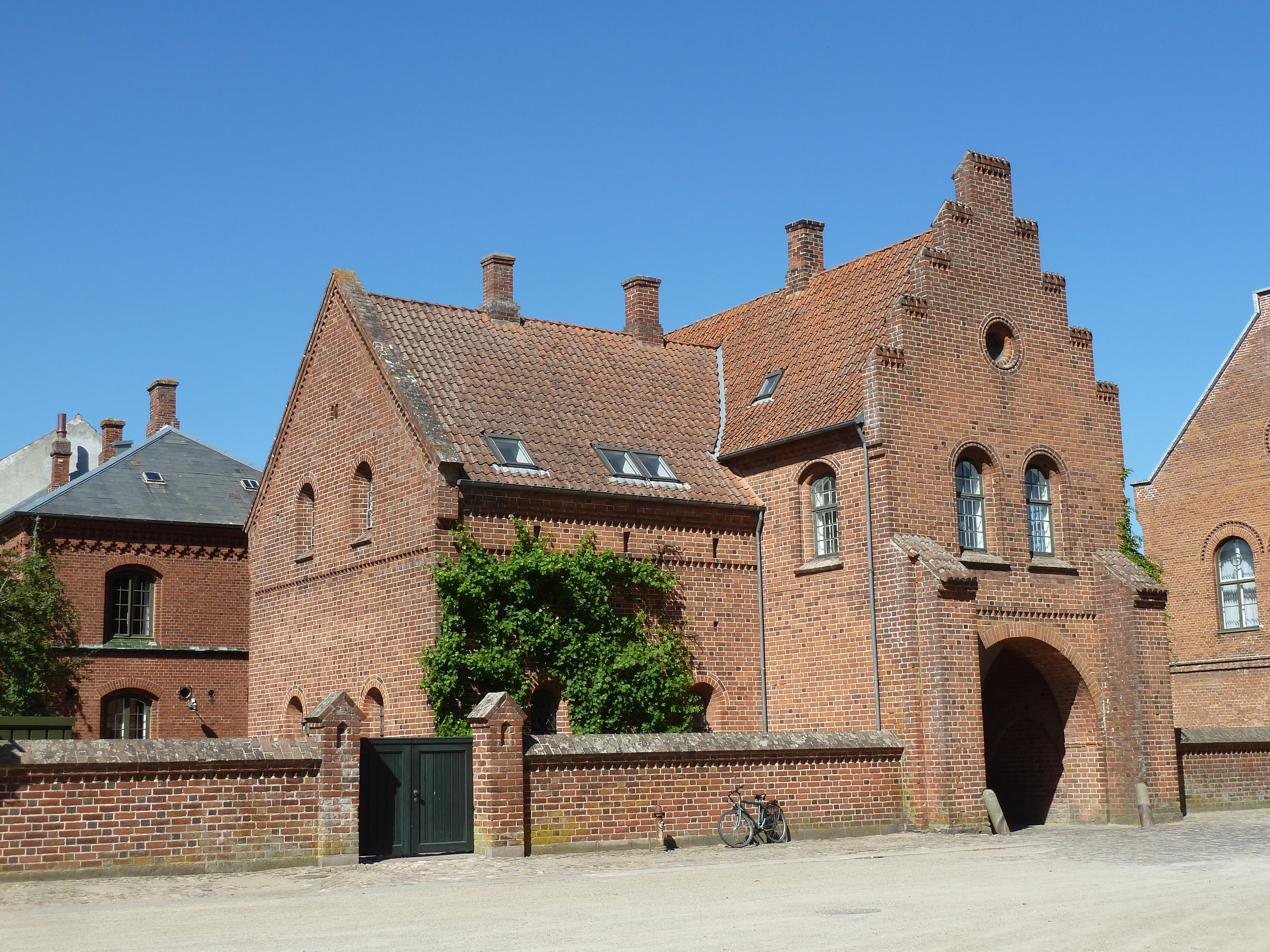
- The original gate to the Sorø Abbey.

Religion
- Affiliation: Order of Saint Benedict – 1161 Cistercians
- Ecclesiastical or organisational status: Episcopal polity
- Year consecrated: 1142

Location
- Location: Sorø

Architecture
- Style: Gothic architecture Romanesque architecture
- Groundbreaking: 1142
- Completed: 1201

Around the lifetime of Skjalm Hvide, it was common practice for the wealthy and powerful to found religious houses, most typically for the following reasons: Expiation of a sinful life; to gain a stage to arrange commemorative and religious masses and events; to have a venue to provide services for the poor; or just out of religious zeal or devotion; or for any combination of the above.

Accordingly, on a land owned by Skjalm Hvide until his death in c. 1113, his sons Ebbe Skjalmsen and Asser Rig in 1140 founded the Sorø Abbey, which became the preeminent and wealthiest monastic house in all of Denmark during the Middle Ages. It acquired property all over Denmark, with an income larger than that of the royal family. Near Sorø, Ebbe also erected the Bjernede Church, and Asser established a Benedictine House, just a few years before his death in 1151. Asser lived as a monk for the last years of his life.

A decade after the passing of Ebbe and Asser in 1151, Asser's son Absalon in 1161 founded the town of Sorø where the Sorø Abbey is located. In 1167, Absalon also founded what became the city Copenhagen. In 1161–1201, he erected on the abbey grounds Sorø Klosterkirke, i.e. the Sorø Abbey Church. The church became a burial site for the noble Hvide family members, including for Absalon himself in 1201, behind the main altar, when the church construction was completed. It became a burial site also for three Danish kings; Christopher II, Valdemar IV Atterdag, and Oluf II, as well as Queen Margaret I of Denmark, who later was moved to the Roskilde Cathedral (Danish: Roskilde Domkirke).

Today, the Sorø Klosterkirke church remains an excellent example of early Brick Gothic architecture. From 1625 onward, the site of the Sorø Abbey has also been the site of the Sorø Academy (Danish: Sorø Akademis Skole), a well-known educational institution.

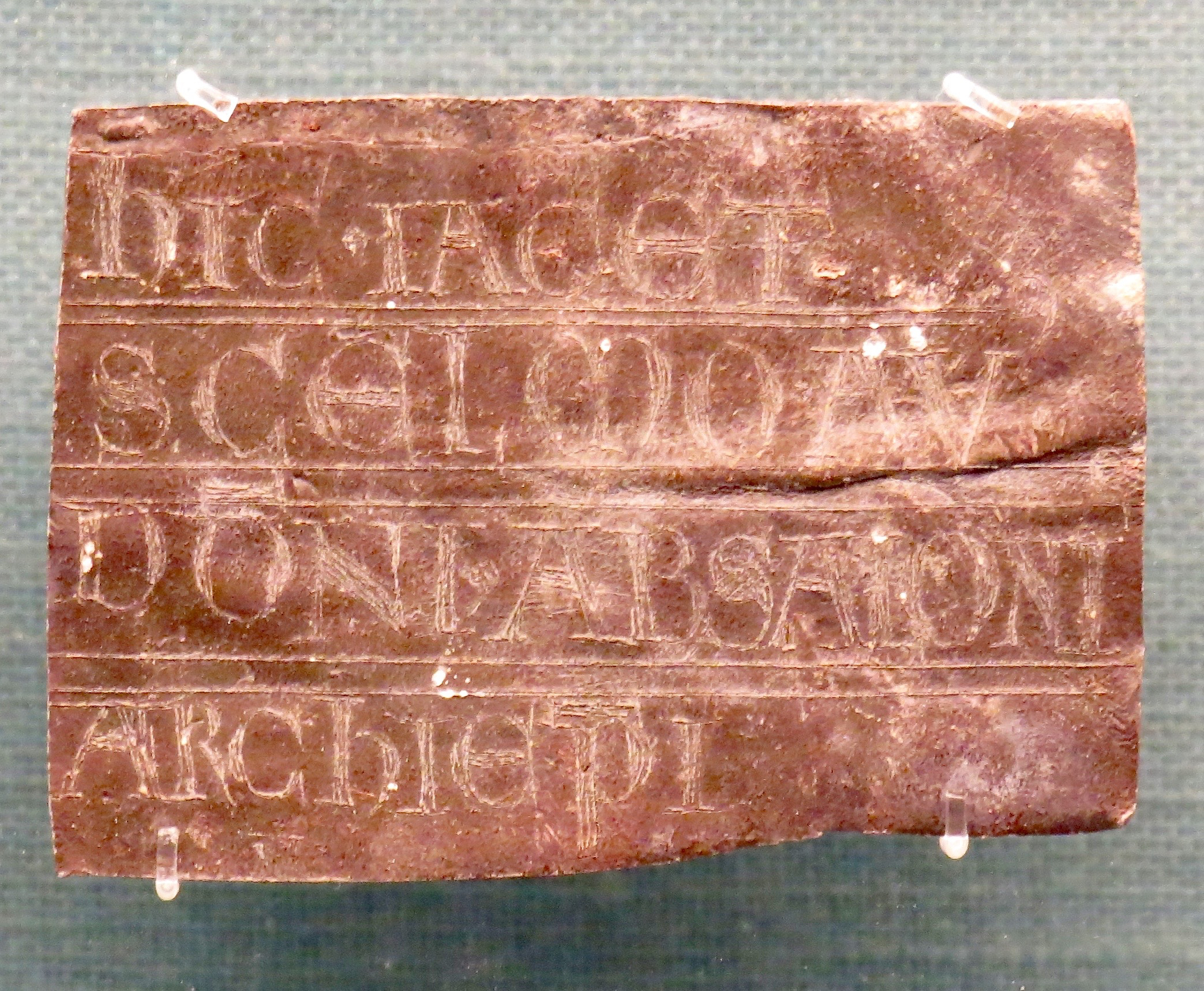
A lead–plate with text found at the Sorø Abbey Church, which tells that Absalon's grandfather is here. The text reads in Latin: "HIC IACET SCELMO BY DONI ABSALONI ARCHIEPI". National Museum of Denmark, Copenhagen.

The most famous residents of the Sorø Abbey have included the Danish historian, theologian and author Saxo Grammaticus (c. 1150 – c. 1220) ("Saxo the Literate", or "Saxo the Learned", literally "Saxo the Grammarian", a.k.a. Saxo cognomine Longus), who was born around the time when Skjalm Hvide's sons Ebbe Skjalmsen and Asser Rig – the founders of the Sorø Abbey – are believed to have died (both in c. 1151).

Saxo the Tall (Danish: Lange), as he was called at Sorø, only later became called "Grammaticus", as a result of his excellently written Latin. Saxo's skill as a Latinist was praised by Erasmus, who wondered how "a Dane of that age got so great power of eloquence". Based on Saxo's writings, he is believed to have been either a clerk or secretary to Archbishop Absalon, the son of Asser Rig and grandson of Skjalm Hvide.

== Saxo Grammaticus at Sorø Abbey ==
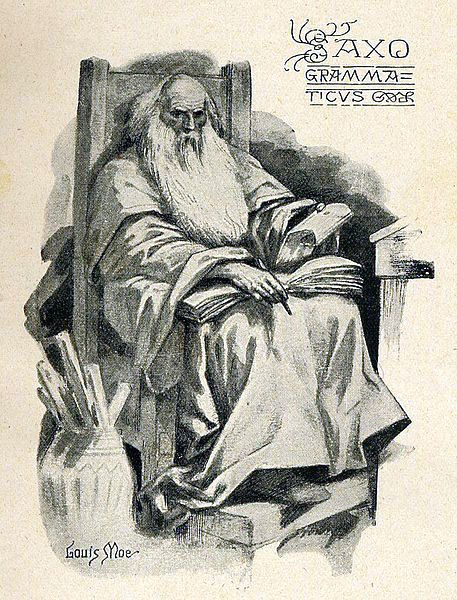
Saxo Grammaticus, drawn by the Norwegian illustrator Louis Moe.

On the invitation from Absalon, Saxo Grammaticus wrote Gesta Danorum ("Deeds of the Danes") at the Sorø Abbey. It is a patriotic work describing Danish and – to some degree – other Nordic and Baltic history, from prehistory to the late 12th century. It consists of sixteen books written in Latin.

It is the most ambitious literary undertaking of medieval Denmark and an essential source for the nation's early history, and also one of the oldest known written documents about the history of Estonia and Latvia. Additionally, Gesta Danorum offers singular reflections on European affairs in the High Middle Ages, from a unique Scandinavian perspective. From Gesta Danorum, the legend of Amleth came to inspire the story of Hamlet by Shakespeare (The Tragedy of Hamlet, Prince of Denmark).

Saxo is thought to have started writing Gesta Danorum in c. 1185. His writings reveal that he was in the retinue – and received the patronage – of Absalon, who was the foremost adviser to King Valdemar I. In his will, Absalon forgives his clerk Saxo a small debt of two and a half silver marks, and instructs Saxo to return two borrowed books to the monastery of Sorø. Saxo is believed to have finished Gesta Danorum by writing the preface for it as the work's last step, in c. 1216, while then being under the patronage of Anders Sunesen, who became the Archbishop of Lund after the death of Absalon in 1201.

Anders Sunesen was a nephew of Absalon and a great-grandson of Skjalm Hvide, and – accordingly – a member of the religious and political elite. Anders was well-traveled, having received his education in theology and philosophy in Paris, France, and his legal education in Bologna, Italy and at Oxford, England. Together with his brother, Anders led a crusade against the Finns in 1202, and in 1219 accompanied Valdemar II in his war against Estonia.

In the preface of Gesta Danorum, Saxo included a warm appreciation of both Archbishops of Lund, Absalon and Anders Sunesen, as well as the reigning King Valdemar II. In the preface, Saxo writes that his patron Absalon, the Archbishop of Lund, had encouraged him to write a heroic history of the Danes. Although Saxo Grammaticus is commonly viewed by the modern-day Danes as their "first national historian", two other coherent accounts of Danish history by Danish authors predate Gesta Danorum.

The earliest one is Chronicon Roskildense (English: Roskilde Chronicle), a small work written in Latin, completed in c. 1143, spanning from the introduction of Christianity in Denmark to the author's own time. The next Danish historiography to be published was Brevis historia regum Dacie, written by Sven Aggesen (b. c. 1140–1150 – death unknown), thought to have been finished in 1186 or 1187 (the last event described happened in 1185), covering the years 300–1185.

Importantly, after the death in 1201 of his patron Absalon, Saxo Grammaticus appears to have changed his agenda. What eventually came to be the first nine books of Gesta Danorum, were actually written after the death of Absalon, and they focus largely on mythology, for which Saxo has been criticized for. The contrast to the seven books written during the lifetime of Absalon is "enormous", leading the main core of scholars to divide the two parts into mythical (books I–IX) and historical (books X–XVI), the last of the historical books being based on Absalon's memories. Therefore, we prefer to support the composition order of Gesta Danorum as X–XVI, followed by I–IX, and ending with the preface, says historian André Muceniecks from the Department of History at University of São Paulo in Brazil.

== Sources ==
- Christopher, Paul J. (31 July 2006). Greatest Cities in the World You Should Visit. Encouragement Press, LLC. ISBN 978-1-933766-01-0.
- Davies, Elwyn (1944). Denmark. Naval Intelligence Division.
- Fisher, Peter; Davidson, Hilda Ellis, eds. (1979), Saxo Grammaticus The History of the Danes, Book I-IX, vol. I: Text, Cambridge: D. S. Brewer
- Fisher, Peter; Davidson, Hilda Ellis, eds. (1980), Saxo Grammaticus The History of the Danes, Book I-IX, vol. II: Commentary, Cambridge: D. S. Brewer
- Harding, Paul (2009). Scandinavian Europe. Lonely Planet. ISBN 978-1-74104-928-2.
- Jones, Gwyn (1968), A History of the Vikings, London: Oxford University Press
- Sawyer, P. H. (1982), Kings and Vikings: Scandinavia and Europe AD 700-1100, New York: Methuen & Co.
- Westergaard, Waldemar (June 1952), "Danish History and Danish Historians", The Journal of Modern History, 24 (2): 167–180, doi:10.1086/237500, JSTOR 1872564, S2CID 143180277
