= Hvide =

Medieval Danish clan

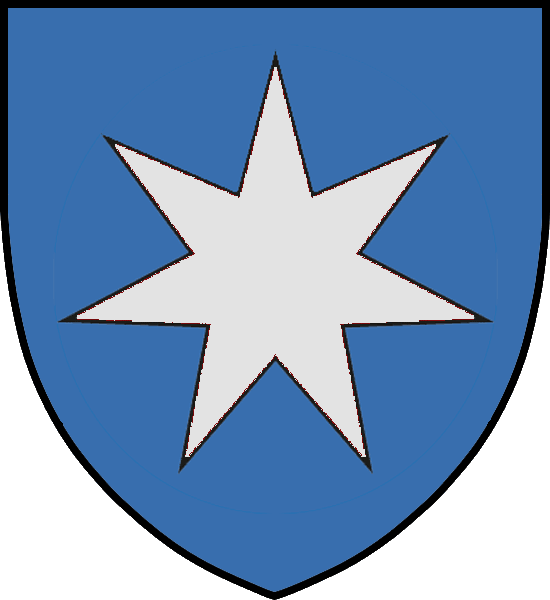
Hvide Coat of arms

The Hvide clan (English: Whites) was a medieval Danish clan, and afterwards in early modern era a Danish noble surname of presumably one surviving branch of leaders of that clan. Before the 16th century it was not used as a surname. It signified the color white.

== Medieval Hvide clan ==
The Hvide were influential in the Danish island of Zealand, and occasionally in other close parts of the country, such as other Danish islands and Skåne. They had a stronghold in Jørlunde.

A folktale of the clan name contrasts this clan against the "black" clan of Viking leaders of Skåne (that then belonged to Denmark but now belongs to Sweden) ("Svarte Skåning") who had Thor as their chief god. The white islander clan were "protectees" of non-black god Odin. The Hvide leaders seem to have been among first to convert to Christianity, and later, the clansmen regularly rose to highest positions of Danish church, including several Roman Catholic archbishops of Lund.

Several leaders of the clan and of variety of its branches are known since the early 12th century. At that time, a number of Hvide leaders were dubbed as "brothers" and as sons of mythical Skjalm Hvide, earl of Zealand in the latter half of the 11th century; or as his grandsons. Such genealogy is however probably a mythical invention, them generally being more distant kinsmen with each other and "brothers" in the sense of being leaders of parts of the same clan.

=== Family of Stig Hvitaleder ===
Stig Tokesen (died 1150) was chieftain of the Hvide (Hvitaledr), a magnate and clan leader in the mid-12th century. His first wife, Margrete Knudsdatter af Hedeby, was a sister of the future King Valdemar I of Denmark and daughter of the "martyred" Knud Lavard, granddaughter of King Eric I of Denmark and his wife Boedil Thurgotsdatter (died 1103). The couple's daughter, Kirsten Stigsdatter (c. 1145 – c. 1200) was married to King Charles VII of Sweden.

=== Family of Asser Rig ===
Brothers Absalon, archbishop of Lund and Esbern Snare, (1127–1204) castellan of the Kalundborg castle, are mentioned as sons of legendary Asser the rich.

=== Galen clan ===
Apparently the Galen, whose maternal forefathers were perceived a branch of Hvide clan, settled in Skåne. At least after continuing in cognatic lines, not agnatic. The "proto"-Galen magnates had originally their seat at Knardrup in Zealand.

Lord High Constable Ebbe Sunesen of Knardrup (died 1208), is on one hand counted as one of the proto-Galen, on the other hand traditionally regarded as a Hvide, and thus apparently was a relative of contemporary leaders of the Hvide clan. (Knardrup Manor), his seat was in northern Zealand, but he is documented to have possessed lands in Skåne (for example, Härlövs borg). After him, the Galen presumably increased their lands in Skåne and more or less moved to that province. Archbishop Jakob Erlandsen is known to have been one of the brothers who were sons of lady Sidsel, the foremother of the Scanian Galen noble family, herself a descendant and heiress of that Knardrup branch of the Hvide clan.

=== Litle family ===
The Litle (de Scania) was a noble family which appears to have started as cognatic offshoot of the proto-Galen branch of the Hvide clan, and settled to Skåne. Their foremother is mentioned to have been a daughter of the aforementioned Ebbe Sunesen, Lord of Knardrup and Härlöv.

=== Prelates ===
The Hvide clan and its relations seem occupied the many powerful positions within the Roman Catholic Church in Denmark for much of the medieval period. Archbishops and bishops considered sons of these clans included:

- Absalon, bishop of Roskilde, then archbishop of Lund
- Niels Stigsen, Bishop of the Diocese of Roskilde
- Petrus Sunonis, Bishop of the Diocese of Roskilde
- Andreas Sunonis, Archbishop of the Diocese of Lund
- Peder Bang, Bishop of the Diocese of Roskilde
- Jakob Erlandsen, Archbishop of the Diocese of Lund
- Karl Eriksen Röde, Archbishop of the Diocese of Lund

== Post-medieval noble family ==
Frederick I, king of Denmark (1523–1533) ordered all nobles to take a surname. At that time, Rødkilde and Katterøe branches of the Hvide clan (according to legendary genealogies, descended from Lord High Constable Stig Andersen Hvide) yet survived in male line, and they took the surname. These Hvide became extinct in the male line already before the beginning of the 17th century. The 19th Century writer Herman Bang was raised by a paternal grandfather, who at times impressed his grandson with stories of their alleged family ties to the historical Hvide clan.

== See also ==
- Hvid
- Hvidt
