= Equestrian statue of Absalon =

Public sculpture in Copenhagen

Coordinates: 55°40′41″N 12°34′48″E

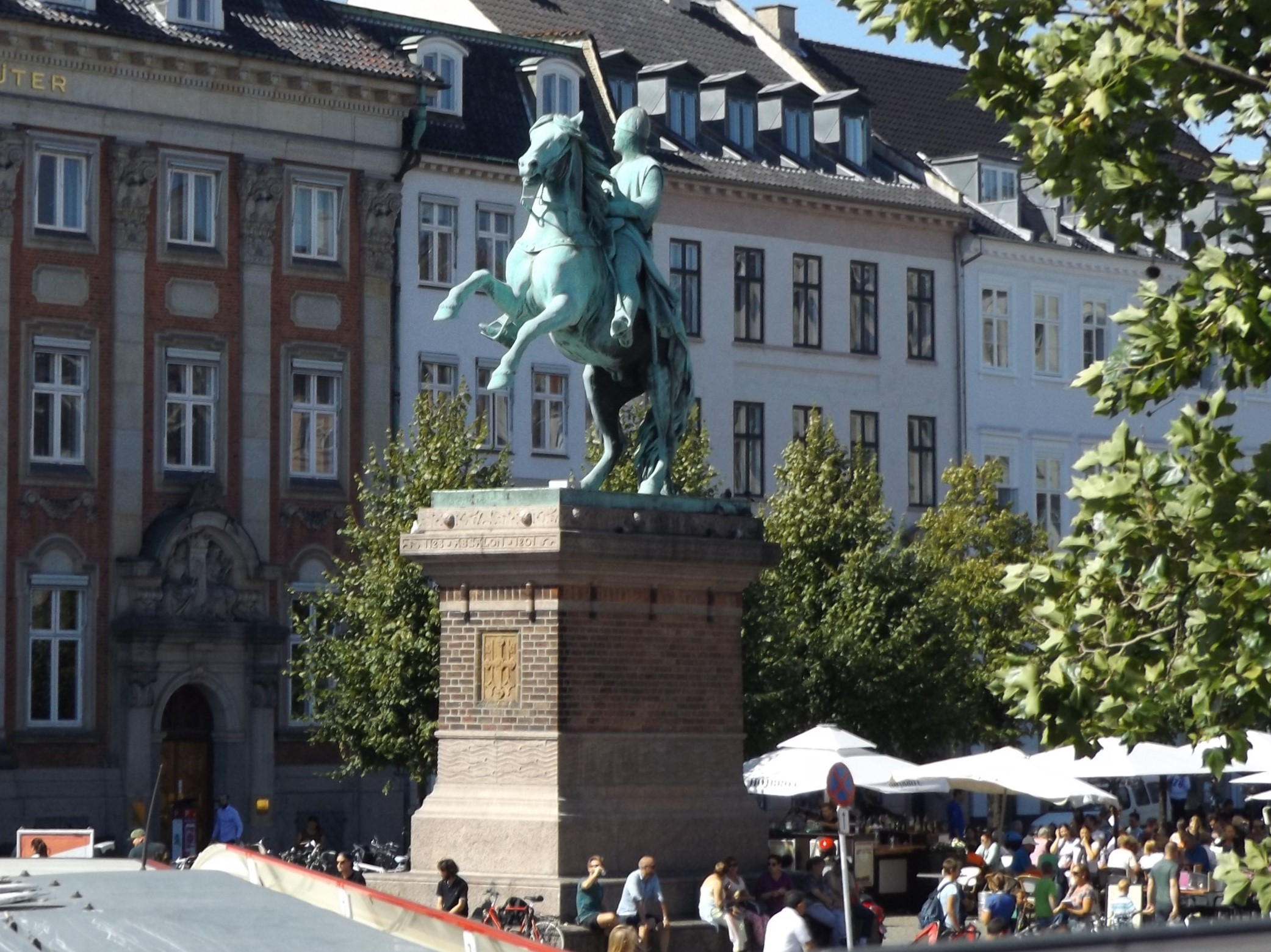
The equestrian statue of Absalon (1902) by Vilhelm Bissen

The equestrian statue of Absalon on Højbro Plads in Copenhagen was unveiled in 1902 to mark the 700th anniversary of the death of Bishop Absalon, the city's legendary founder.

== Description ==
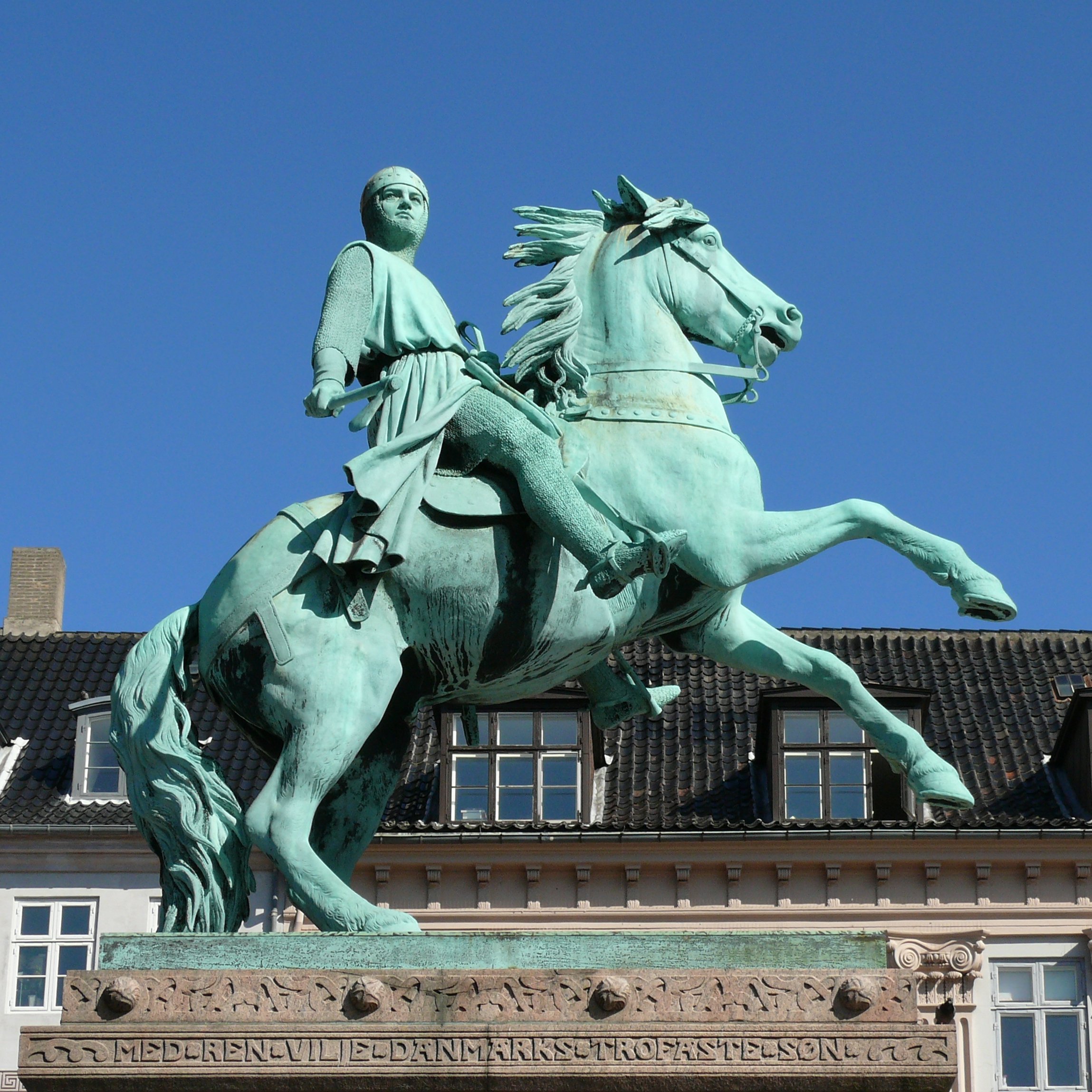
The equestrian statue of Absalon

The statue represents Absalon as a military commander, mounted on a rearing horse, wearing mail and a helmet, holding an axe in his right hand. The statue faces Christiansborg Palace on Slotsholmen, where Absalon's bishop's castle once stood, but he turns his head to the right, looking in the direction of Copenhagen City Hall.

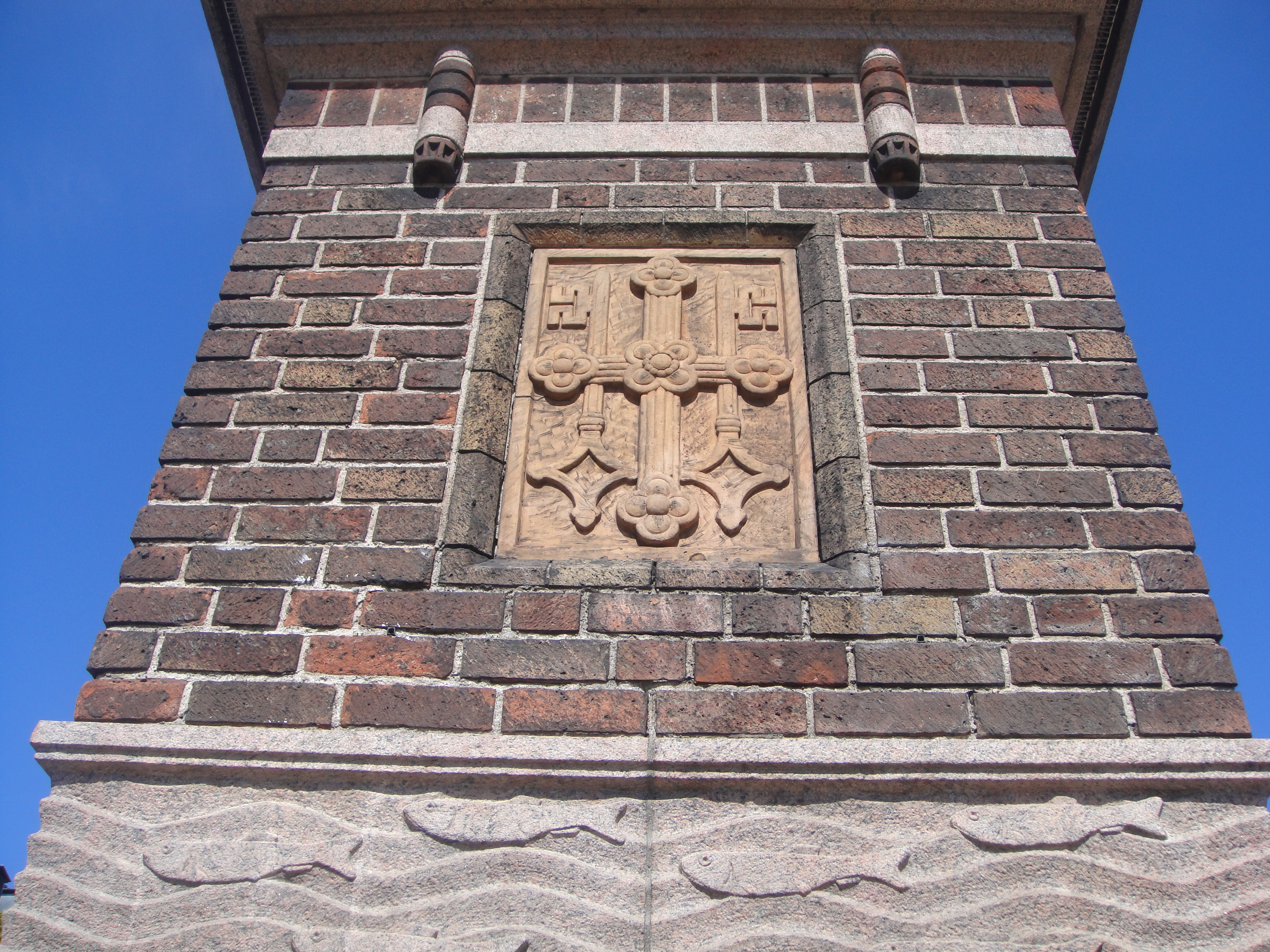
Decorations on the plinth

The lower part of the plinth is made of granite and designed for seating. The upper part is built in red brick. A frieze at the bottom of the upper part features a school of fish and wavy lines, symbolizing Øresund and the herring fishing which in Absalon's day significantly contributed to the wealth of the small fishing hamlet. Other decorations include Viking ornamentation. On the front side is a coat of arms with a rosy cross and two intersecting Keys of Heaven, a reference to Absalon's status as Bishop of Roskilde. At the top of the plinth is another frieze with lettering in relief. On the front side, it reads: "1128 ABSALON 1201". Beginning on the right-hand side, a scroll around the three other sides reads: "He was brave, clever and visionary / a lover of learning / with a clean will the loyal son of Denmark" (Danish: Han var modig, snild og fremsynet / en ynder af lærdom / med ren vilje Danmarks trofaste søn).

== History ==
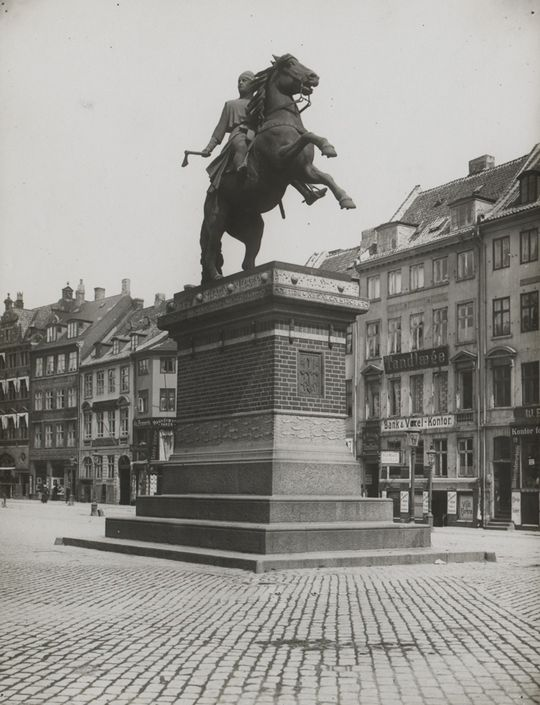
The Absalon statue in the 1900s

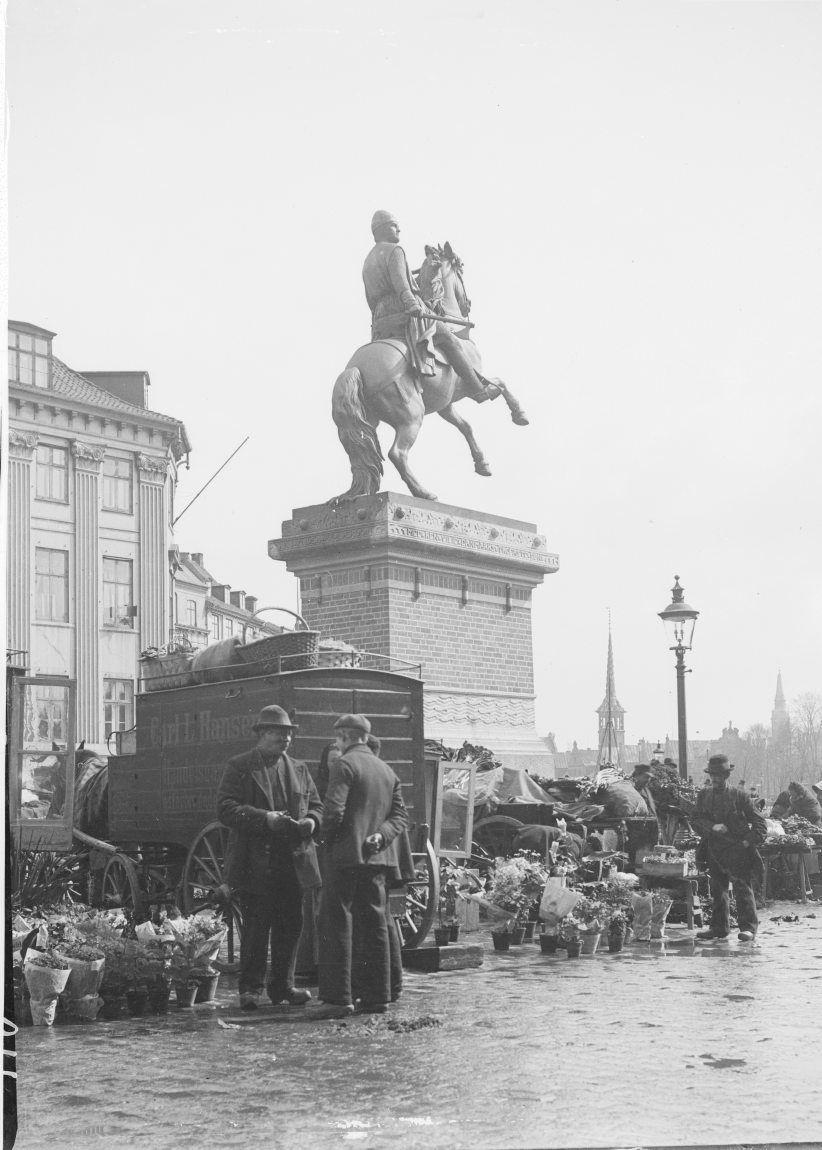
The statue photographed by Fritz Theodor Benzen

The statue was a gift to the City of Copenhagen from Axel Heide, managing director of Privatbanken. Vilhelm Bissen was charged with the design of the statue while Martin Nyrop designed the plinth. Heide originally wanted the statue to be unveiled on Absalon's birthday, 21 March, but it was delayed by the City Council who wanted to reserve this date for the unveiling of another statue of Absalon situated above the main entrance on the façade of the new city hall. The statue was instead unveiled on 30 November 1902. Heide also wanted Georg Brandes to give a speech at the unveiling ceremony, but this was rejected by the political establishment who found his liberal views too controversial. Heide then proposed that the bishop of Zealand could also speak at the ceremony, but this compromise was also rejected. When Crown Princess Louise threatened to close her accounts in Privatbanken, Heide finally accepted to cancel Brandes.

== See also ==
- Sculpture of Denmark
