= Sorø Abbey Church =

Church building in Sorø Municipality, Denmark

Coordinates: 55°25′48″N 11°33′23″E

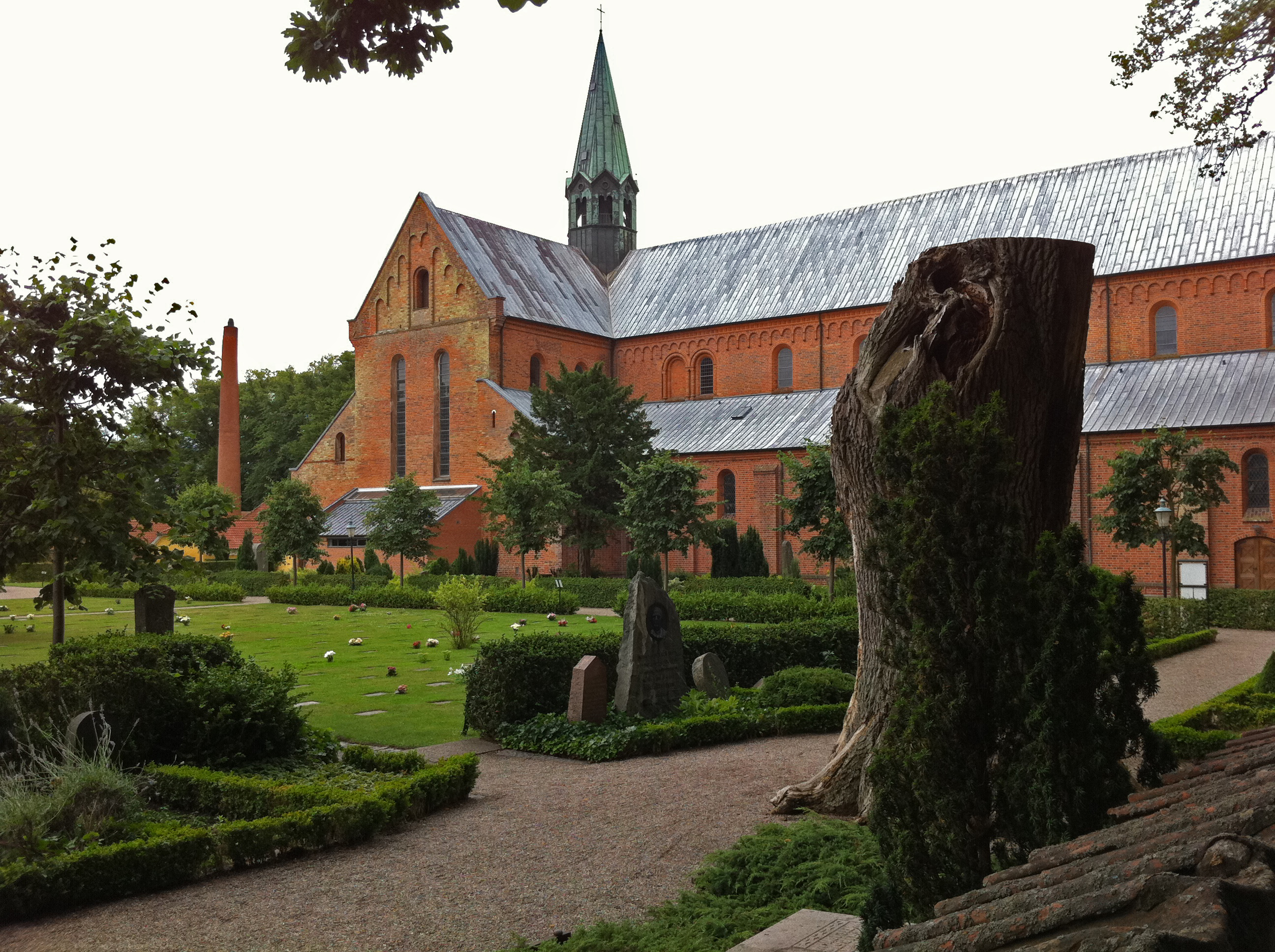
Sorø Klosterkirke and grounds.

Sorø Abbey Church (Danish: Sorø Klosterkirke) is a church located in the Danish town of Sorø. It was founded by Danish archbishop Absalon and built by Cistercians in the period from 1161 to 1201. It is made of red brick, which was a new material for the time, and built similar style to the Abbey of Fontenay.

The abbey contains a number of royal graves including that of Archbishop Absalon, King Christopher II, Queen Euphemia, King Valdemar Atterdag, and King Olaf Haraldsen. Sorø Academy Foundation (Stiftelsen Sorø Akademi), which also operates Sorø Academy, is responsible for the Abbey.

== Notable burials ==
=== Inside the church ===
Burials inside the church:

- Absalon, bishop
- Christopher II of Denmark, King of Denmark
- Euphemia of Pomerania, Queen of Denmark
- Henrik, Duke of Sønderjylland
- Olaf II of Denmark, King of Denmark and Norway
- Valdemar IV of Denmark, King of Denmark
- Sune Ebbesen,
- Laurids Foss, medical doctor and headmaster of Sorø School
- Christian Friis
- Anne Gøye
- Falk Gøye, landowner and headmaster of Sorø Academy
- Mette Gøye, translator
- Peder von Haven, theologian
- Ludvig Holbergm historian, playwright
- Skjalm Hvide
- Mogens Høg, privy councillor
- Lauritz Laurberg Kongslew, jurist
- Jens Krag, Bishop of Roskilde
- Hans Lauremberg
- Peder Låle
- Johannes Meursius, scholar and antiquary
- Henning Podebusk
- Ove Ramel, landowner and administrator
- Wolf Veit Christoph von Reitzenstein
- Asser Rig
- Jørgen Rosenkrantz
- Johann Elias Schlegel, poet
- Jens Maltesen Sehested, military officer and landowner
- Ove Ramel Sehested, landowner
- Toke Skjalmsen, chancellor and crusader
- Esbern Snare
- Otto Thott, politician and landowner
- Henrik Christiernsen Tornekrands, abbot
- Skjalm Vognsen, bishop
- Abraham Wuchters, painter
- Niels Aagaard, headmaster, librarian and professor

=== Churchyard ("Old Cemetery") ===
Burials at the churchyard:

- Thøger Binneballe, architect and master builder
- Jacob Hornemann Bredsdorff, natural historian
- Olaf Carlsen, historian and educator
- Frederik Carl Eide, forester
- Henning Funch Jensen, Supreme Court justice
- Knud Færch, furniture designer
- Torben Glahn, chief librarian
- Frederik Carl Christian Hansen, architect
- Bartholomæus Hoffm headmaster
- Paul Honoré, priest and writer
- Torkil Abraham Hoppe, government official
- B.S. Ingemann, author, gymnwriter, poet
- Lucie Ingemann, painter
- Frederik Marcus Knuth, politician
- Erling Kristensenm headmaster
- Christian Molbech, linguist and literary historian
- Chr. K.F. Molbech, poet and translator
- Johan Christian Molbech, professor
- Carl Mundt, mathematician and politician
- Siegfred Neuhaus, painter
- Anna Sarauwm textile artist
- Andreas Schytte, political scientist
- Christian Ludvig Stemann, politician
- Poul Hagerup Tregderm philologist and headmaster
- Georg Christian Ulrich, forester
- Hans Ussing, zoologist
- Henrik Ussing, philologist and folklorist
- Knud Vad, organist and conductor
- Emil Vedel, archaeologist and government official
- Vilhelm Wedell-Wedellsborgm civil servant and county governor
- Christian Wilster, poet and translator
- Palle Wodschow, industrialist and company founder
