= Historia de Profectione Danorum in Hierosolymam =

13th-century Latin text about an attempted crusade

Historia de Profectione Danorum in Hierosolymam ('History of the Journey of the Danes to Jerusalem') is a thirteenth-century Latin text recounting an otherwise unknown journey of a Danish and Norwegian fleet to Jerusalem during the Third Crusade. According to this text, a fleet set out in 1191/2 and, after a long delay in Norway and losing several ships in a storm in the North Sea, arrived at Jerusalem too late to join in with any fighting and returned home after visiting some holy sites.

== Text ==
The text was written around 1200 in highly stylised Latin and contains several tropes of European crusading discourse, such as comparing the crusaders to Abraham, to the Israelites fleeing Egypt, and the Jesus’ disciples leaving their homes and belongings behind. The text was discovered in about 1620 in Lubeck in a parchment manuscript, no longer extant, which also contained Josephus’s De bello Judaico and a life of St Genevieve by William of Ebelholt. Textual evidence suggests that the author was a Norwegian canon who spent some time in Tønsberg, perhaps in the Premonstratensian order there.

The attempted crusade is not mentioned by other near-contemporary historians such as Saxo Grammaticus or Snorri Sturluson.

== Content ==
The narrator opens by stating that the fall of Jerusalem has been caused by the sins of the people. An otherwise unknown letter from the Pope describing Jerusalem’s fall into pagan hands arrives at the Danish court. Amid the Danes' grief at the news, Esbern Snare, brother of the Archbishop Absalon, gives a speech encouraging people to take lessons from their glorious Danish ancestors and travel to Jerusalem. Fifteen Danish magnates prepare to set out, but ten of them later reconsider. The remaining five leaders travel to Norway.

The Danish fleet joins up with the fleet of a Norwegian, Ulf of Laufness (known from Sverris saga). The fleet calls in Tønsberg, which the author describes at length, saying that he is from the area. In Bergen, the Danes start a drunken fight and are visited by King Sverre. Ulf wants to stay and finish some business he has, but most of the Danish fleet, unwilling to delay, sets off.

The fleet runs into a storm in the North Sea. The ship of Sven Torkilsson, who had waited to set off with Ulf, is destroyed. Other travellers lose all their belongings.

The fleet arrives in Jerusalem to find that peace has been agreed between Christians and pagans. They visit holy sites and travel home via Constantinople.

== Edition and translations ==
- Gertz, M., ed., 'Historia de Profectione Danorum in Hierosolymam' in Scriptes minores II (1922)
- Svare, Bjarne, trans. [in modern Norwegian], Jorsal-ferda åt danene, Norrøne bokverk 31 (1934)
- Salvesen, Astrid, trans. [in Bokmål], Historien om danenes ferd til Jerusalem, in Astrid Salvesen, ed., I: Norges historie. Historien om de gamle norske kongene / av Theodricus munk. Historien om danenes ferd til Jerusalem (1969)
