= Cecilia Knutsdatter =

Danish princess, daughter of Canute IV

Cecilia Knudsdatter of Danmark
- Born: 1081/85
- Died: after 7 January 1131
- Spouse: Eric, Jarl of Falster
- Issue: Knud; Carl, Duke of Halland; Inger Eriksdotter
- House: Estridsen
- Father: Canute IV of Denmark
- Mother: Adela of Flanders

Cecilia Knudsdatter of Danmark (1081/85 – after 7 January 1131), was a Danish princess, daughter of Canute IV of Denmark and Adela of Flanders.

At the deposition and murder of her father in 1086, her mother left Denmark and returned to Flanders with her son Charles, while Cecilia and her sister Ingegerd followed their paternal uncle Eric I of Denmark and aunt Boedil Thurgotsdatter, who became their foster parents, to Sweden.

Eric and Boedil returned to Denmark when Eric rescinded to the throne in 1095. Both sisters married Swedish nobility. Cecilia married Earl Eric. She later returned to Denmark, where her spouse was made jarl of Falster, and the couple settled at Haraldsted at Ringsted. The couple had two sons: Knud and Carl, Duke of Halland. She also possibly had a daughter Inger Eriksdotter, who married Asser Rig, a magnate of the Hvide clan from Fjenneslev on Zealand, and was the mother of Esbern Snare and Absalon.

In 1131, Canute Lavard visited her. She suspected that he would be murdered and tried to convince him not to go to his meeting with Magnus, where he was to be killed, but he disregarded her advice.

== Sources ==
- Line, Philip (2007). Kingship and State Formation in Sweden: 1130 - 1290. Brill.
- Dansk biografisk Lexikon / IV. Bind. Clemens - Eynden
- Cecilia, urn:sbl:16520, Svenskt biografiskt lexikon (art av Nat. Beckman.), hämtad 2015-02-14.
- Dansk biografisk Lexikon / IV. Bind. Clemens - Eynden
