= Svend Nordmand =

Bishop of Roskilde

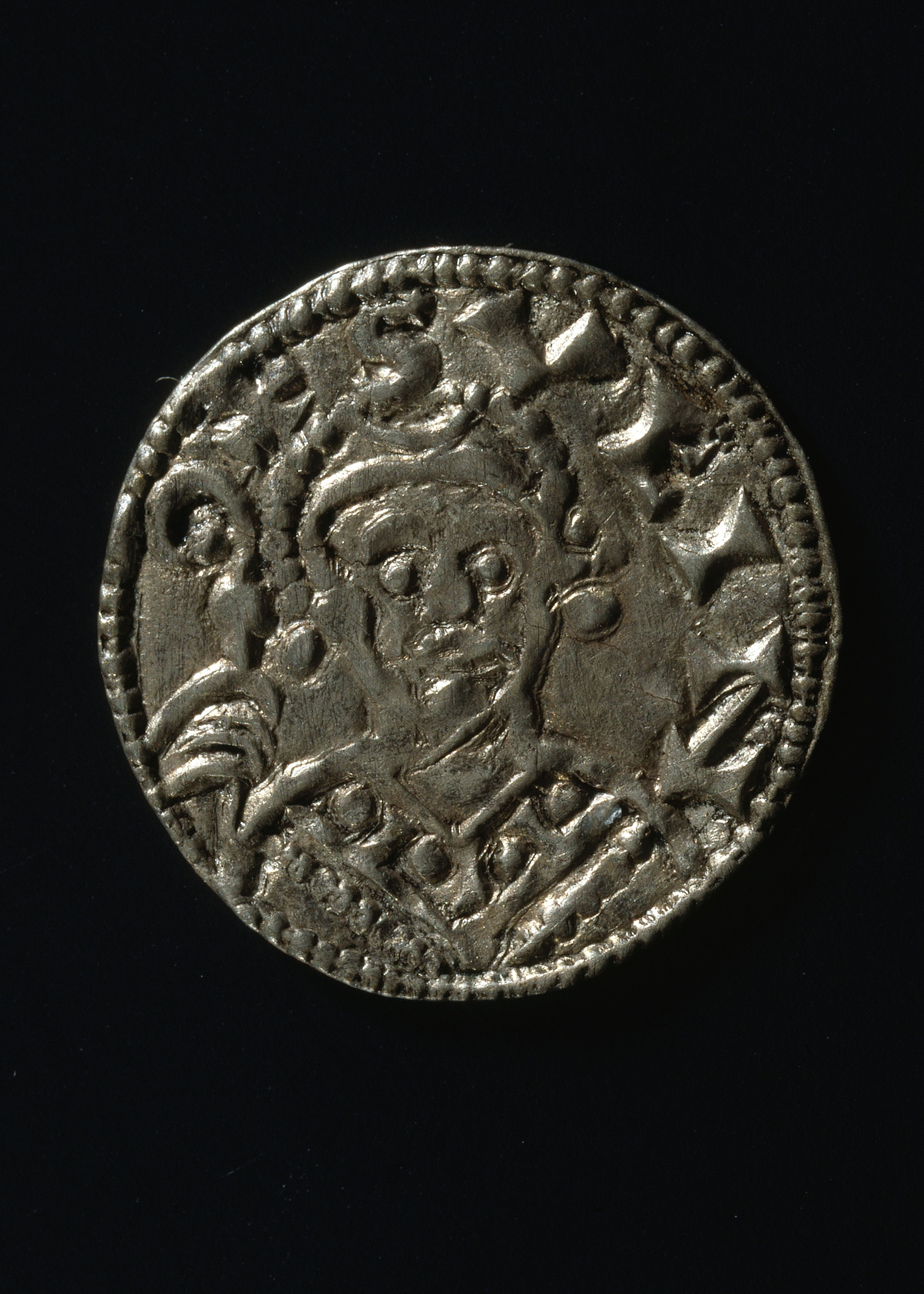
Coin believed to have been minted by Svend Nordmand.

Svend Nordmand (died 1088) was a Danish prelate of the Roman Catholic Church who served as the Vishop of Roskilde from 1074 to 1088. He started his career in the service of Svend Estridsen.

== Legacy ==
A coin in the collection of the National Museum believed to have been minted by Svend Nordmand is the earliest known example of a Danish coin minted by a bishop rather than a monarch.
