= Absalon's Castle =

Ruined castle on Slotsholmen, Denmark

Coordinates: 55°40′35″N 12°34′50″E

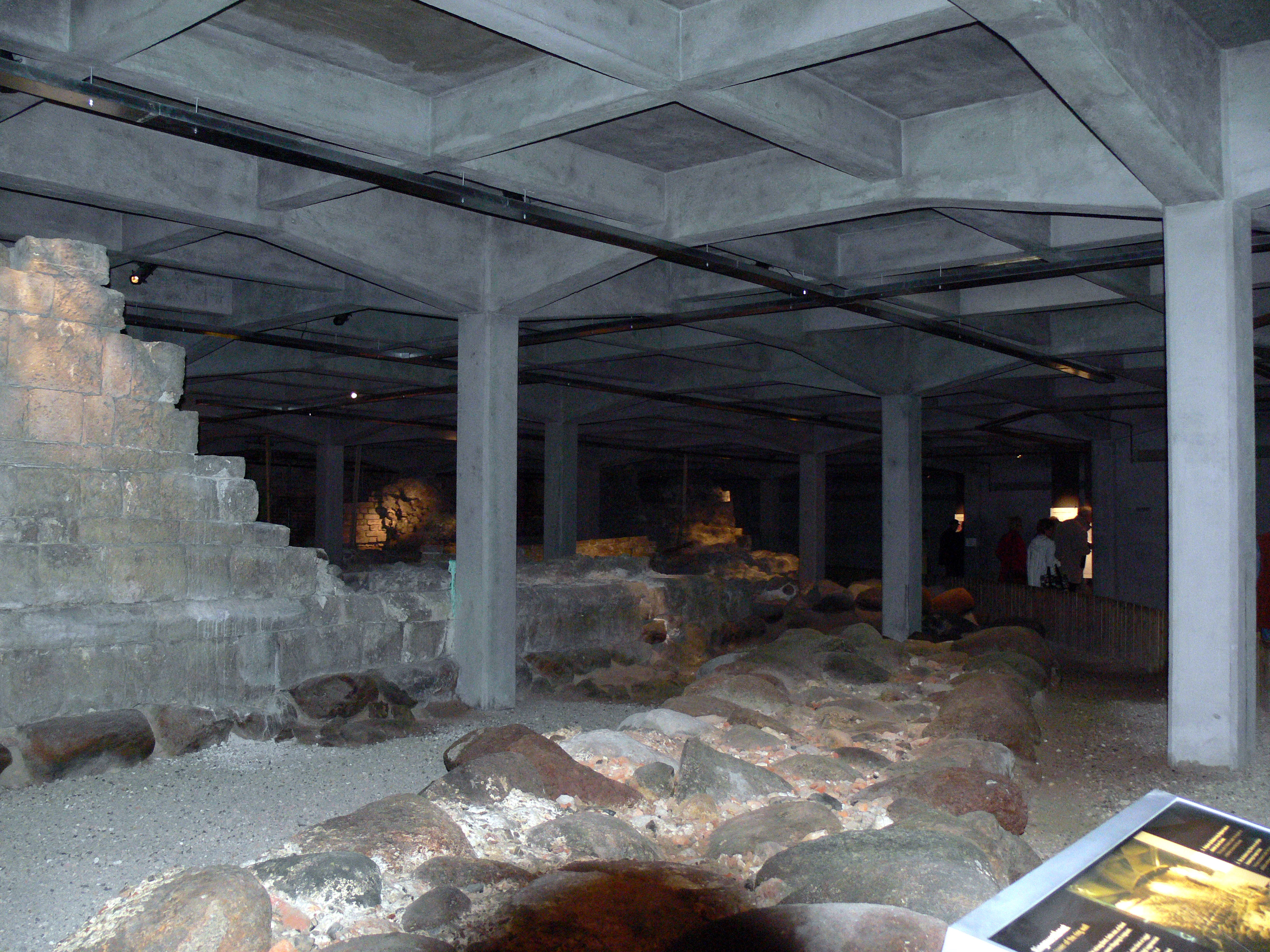
The ruins of Absalon's Castle at Christiansborg Palace in Copenhagen

Absalon's Castle, (Danish: Absalons borg) was a fortification on the island of Slotsholmen in Copenhagen, located at the site of the later Copenhagen Castle and Christiansborg Palace. According to the chronicler Saxo Grammaticus, the castle was founded by Bishop Absalon in 1167 to protect the emerging city of Copenhagen. The castle survived for 200 years before it was destroyed in 1369 by the Hanseatic League, who first occupied and plundered it, and then demolished it completely.

The castle was made up by a curtain wall, encircling an enclosed courtyard with several buildings such as the bishop's residence, a chapel and several minor buildings. The ruins of Absalon's Castle can be seen today in the subterranean excavations under Christiansborg Palace.

== History ==
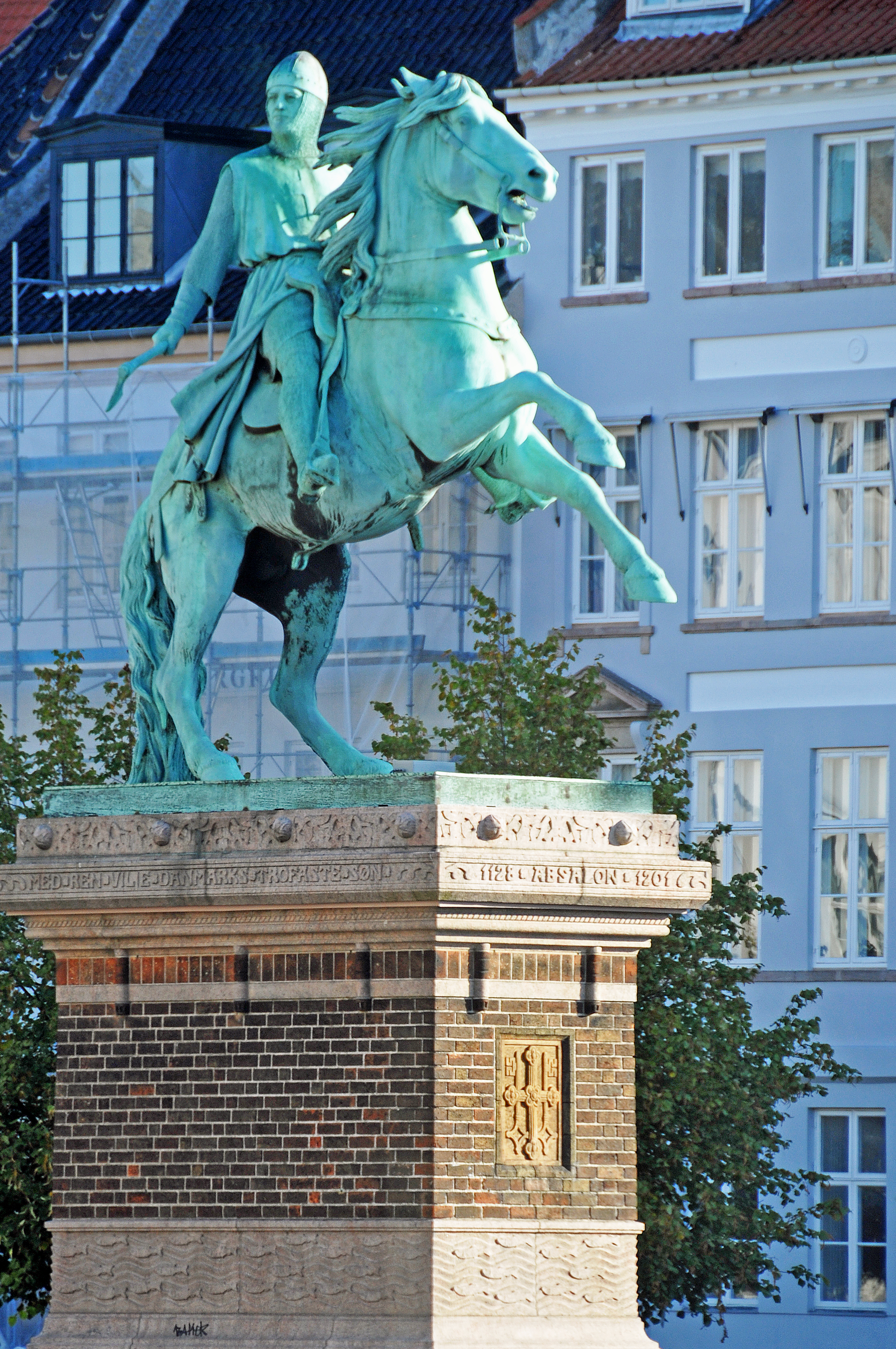
Vilhelm Bissen's equestrian statue of Absalon on Højbro Plads, facing Christiansborg where his castle once stood

According to the chronicler Saxo Grammaticus, Absalon's Castle – sometimes also referred to as "Bishop Absalon's Castle" (Danish: Biskop Absalons borg) or "Absalon's castle by the port" (Danish: Absalons borg ved havn) – was founded in 1167 by Bishop Absalon of Roskilde, who in 1157 had received the city of Copenhagen and its surroundings as a gift from King Valdemar I of Denmark.

At the death of Absalon in 1201, possession of the castle and city passed to the Diocese of Roskilde. A few decades later, however, a bitter feud erupted between crown and church, and for almost two centuries the right to possession of the castle and city was heavily contested.

In 1368 the castle and city was conquered by a coalition of enemies of King Valdemar IV of Denmark, most notably the Hanseatic League, Albert, King of Sweden, the Duke of Mecklenburg and the counts of Holstein. The following year, the castle was torn down to the ground as a result of the peace treaty.

After the destruction of the castle, the remnants were covered by a motte, on top of which the Copenhagen Castle and later Christiansborg Palace were constructed. The remnants of the castle were discovered and excavated in 1907 and 1917 during the construction of the present Christiansborg Palace.

== The castle ==
The castle was surrounded by a curtain wall of limestone from Stevns Cliffs. The remains of this curtain wall are preserved today in the ruins beneath Christiansborg, and it can be seen from the ruins how the wall was constructed. From Absalon's Castle, the foundations of some houses, which lay within the curtain wall, and a well have also been preserved. The well, a so-called hulk well made from hollowed out oak trunks, contained when it was excavated several building fragments of marble, believed to originate from a church which must have lain within the Bishop's castle.

== See also ==
- Bispegården, Copenhagen
