= Jørlunde =

Village in Frederikssund Municipality, Denmark

Coordinates: 55°50′N 12°11′E

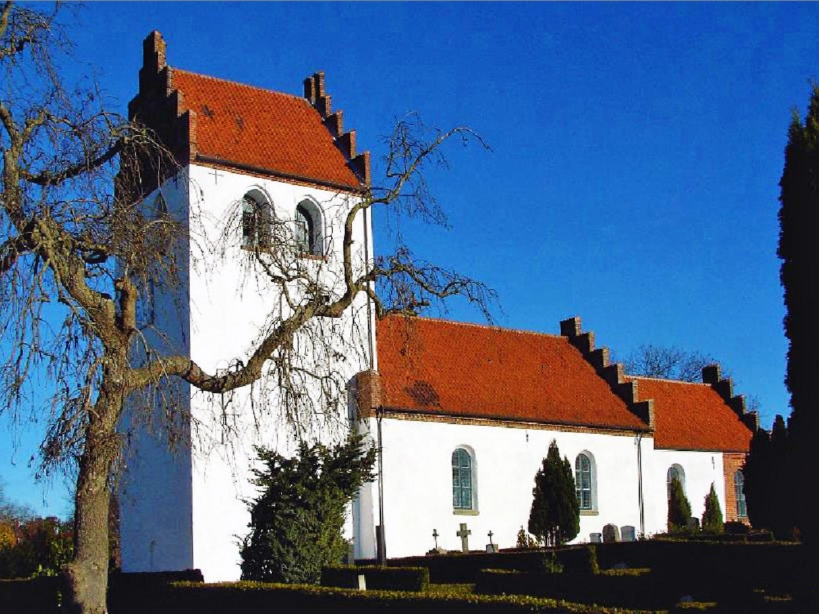
Jørlunde Church

Jørlunde is a village with a population of 301 (1 January 2026) in North Zealand in Denmark.

In the late Viking age and early medieval age, Jørlunde was the center of the Hvide clan. Jørlunde Church (Joerlunde Kirke) was erected by Skjalm Hvide around the year 1100.
