= Inger Eriksdotter =

Noblewoman

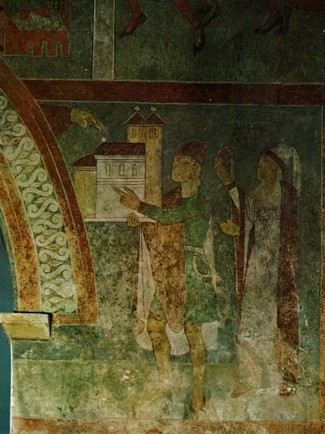
- Asser Rig and his wife, Inger Eriksdotter, in a Fresco at the Fjenneslev Church
- Born: ca. 1100
- Died: 1157
- Buried: 1157; Sorø Klosterkirke
- Spouse: Asser Rig
- Issue: Absalon, Archbishop of Lund; Esbern Snare; Ingefred Assersdatter
- Father: Jarl Erik of Faster
- Mother: Cecilia Knutsdatter of Denmark

Inger Eriksdotter (also Inga, Inge) (ca. 1100–1157) was the wife of Asser Rig, tribal chief of Zealand (Sjælland) in today's Denmark.

Inger's father is said to have been Earl Eric. Her mother was Princess Cecilia Knutsdatter (daughter of Canute IV of Denmark and Adela of Flanders).

Inger and Asser resided at Fjenneslevlille and built Fjenneslev Kirke. With him, she bore three children: Absalon, future Archbishop of Lund, Esbern Snare and Ingefred Assersdatter.

Inger was buried in Sorø Klosterkirke in approximately 1157.
