= Hvid =

Hvid is a Danish surname literally meaning "white". Notable people with the surname include:

- Inge Hvid-Møller (1912–1970) was a Danish actress and stage director.
- Juliane Hvid (born 1998), Danish steeplechase runner
- Kigge Hvid, founding CEO of The Index Project, Danish nonprofit organisation that promotes designs aimed at the quality of life

== See also ==
- Hvide ("The Whites"), Danish clan
