= Asser Rig =

Danish jarl and chieftain

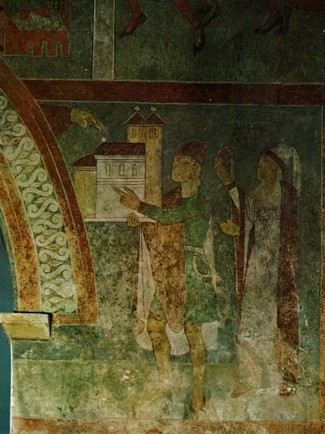
Asser Rig and his wife, Inger Eriksdotter, in a Fresco at the Fjenneslev Church

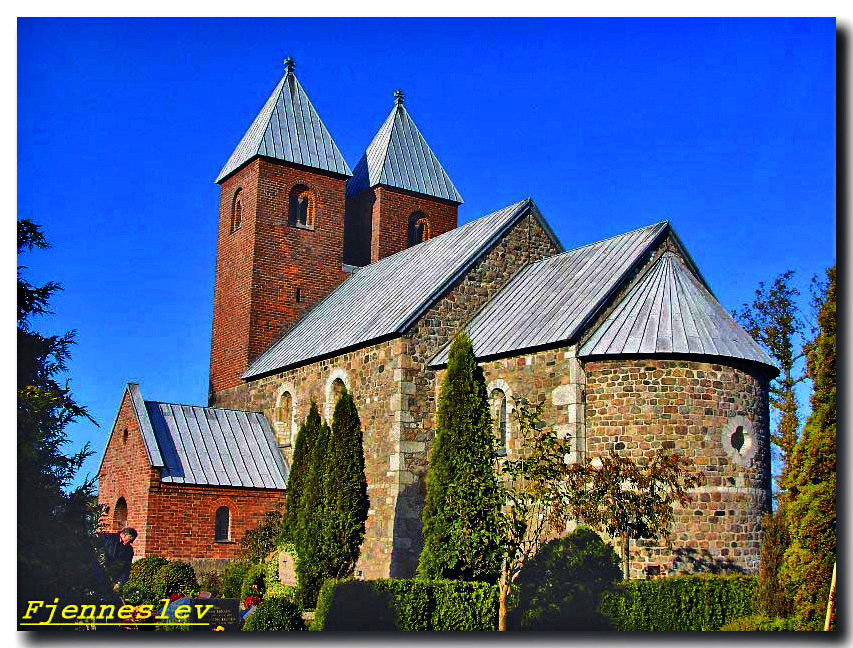
Fjenneslev Church at Sorø

Asser Rig (c. 1078–1151) was a jarl and chieftain from Zealand, Denmark, a son of Skjalm Hvide (before 1045 – c. 1113) and Signe Asbjørnsdatter (c. 1050 – c. 1096). They are sometimes referred to as Asser Rig Skjalmsen Hvide.

== Siblings ==
Asser's siblings were (children of Skjalm and Signe) Margrethe Skjalmsdatter Hvide (1073–1162); Cecilie Skjalmsdatter Hvide (c. 1084 – 1161); Toke Skjalmsen Hvide (1085–1145); Sune Skjalmsen Hvide (c. 1086 – c. 1140); and Ebbe Skjalmsen Hvide af Knardrup (c. 1090 – 1151).

== Life ==
Asser married Inger Eriksdotter (c. 1100–1157), the daughter of Eric, the Jarl of Falster, and Princess Cecilia Knutsdatter, a daughter of King Canute IV of Denmark (c. 1042 – 10 July 1086), the first Danish king (1080–1086) to be canonized, recognized by the Roman Catholic Church as Patron Saint of Denmark in 1101.

Asser and Inger settled to live in Fjenneslev, Zealand, where they erected the Fjenneslev Church (Fjenneslev Kirke) in Sorø. They gave birth to Absalon (c. 1128–1201), who became a powerful warrior leader and main advisor to Danish kings, and also Bishop of Roskilde and later Archbishop of Lund. The other two children of Asser and Inger were Esbern Snare (c. 1127–1204) and Ingefred Assersdatter (c. 1130-1160).

== Activities of Asser Rig's son Absalon ==
A period of warfare and Danish expansion was led by Archbishop Absalon and the Kings Valdemar I and Valdemar II. In this era, the Danes were also being threatened by the Wends who were making raids across the Danish border and by sea. Among other things, Absalon was responsible for Valdemar I winning the over 10 years long Danish civil war. After Valdemar I, Absalon helped his successor, King Canute VI. Later, Valdemar II led a Danish expedition across the Elbe River to invade Holstein.

== Sources ==
- Fisher, Peter; Davidson, Hilda Ellis, eds. (1980), Saxo Grammaticus The History of the Danes, Book I-IX, vol. II: Commentary, Cambridge: D. S. Brewer
- Westergaard, Waldemar (June 1952), "Danish History and Danish Historians", The Journal of Modern History, 24 (2): 167–180, doi:10.1086/237500, JSTOR 1872564
