= Jørlunde Church =

Church building in Frederikssund Municipality, Denmark

Coordinates: 55°49′50″N 12°10′10″E

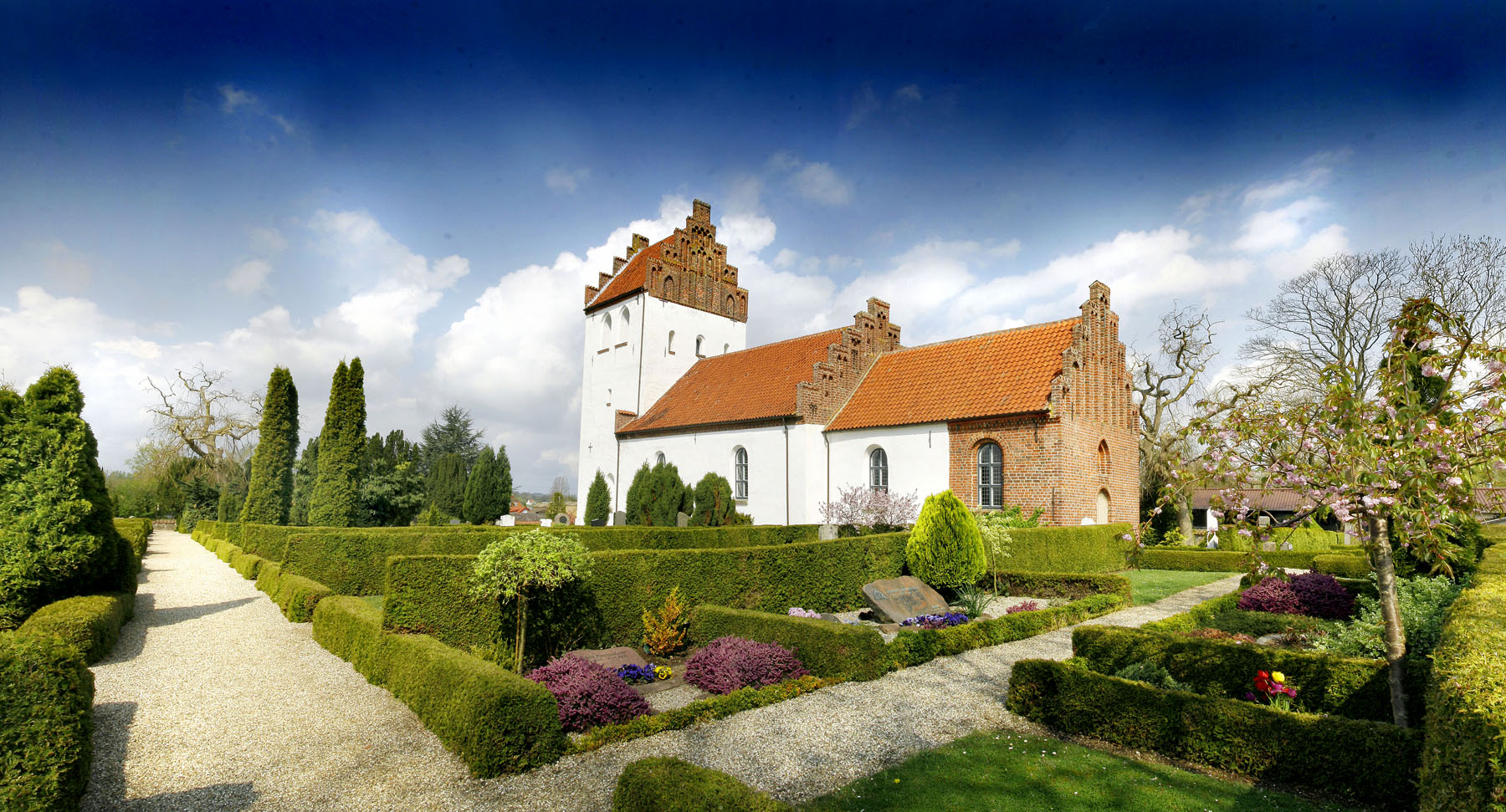
Jørlunde Church

Jørlunde Church (Danish: Jørlunde Kirke) is a late Viking age/early medieval church situated in Jørlunde, Denmark. The church was built by Skjalm Hvide around the year 1085.

== Church frescos ==
The church is richly decorated inside with frescos dating back to the middle of the 12th century created by the so-called Jørlunde workshop.

== Pipe organ ==
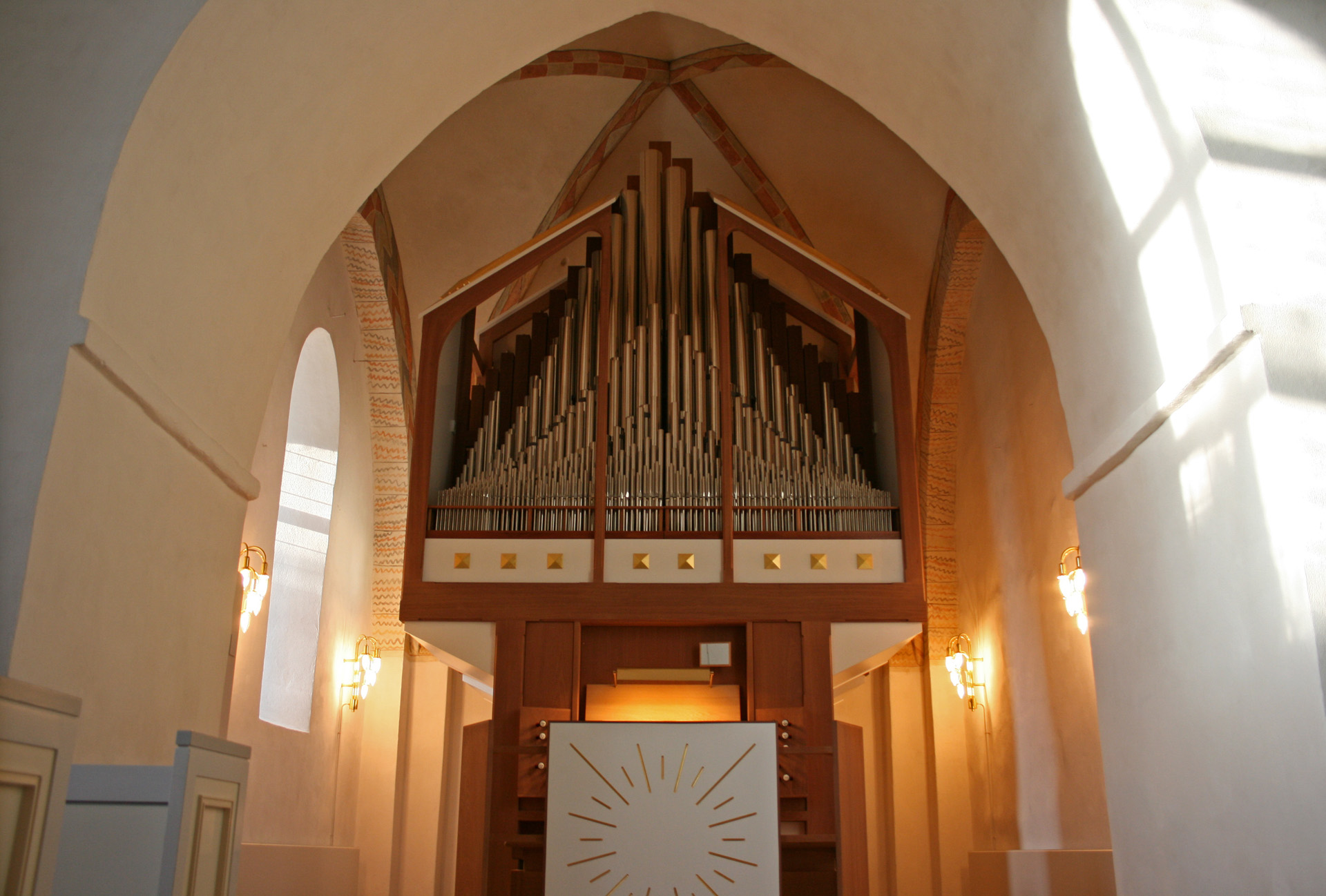
The pipe organ

The pipe organ was built by Frobenius in 2009 and has 19 voices, 24 stops, 25 ranks and 1360 pipes, amongst them the tallest organ pipes installed in a Danish village church. The organ's architects are Inger and Johannes Exner. The specifications and tonal design are created by the composer Frederik Magle. The album Like a Flame was recorded on the organ.

=== Specifications ===
Manual I, Great C–g^{3}
Gedakt	16′
Principal	8′
Traversfløjte	8′
Tectus	8′
Oktav	4′
Fløjte	4′
Oktav	2′
Mixtur IV	1^{1}/_{3}′
Trompet	8′

Manual II, Swell C–g^{3}
Rørfløjte	8′
Fugara	8′
Vox Angelica	8′
Gemshorn	4′
Schweizerfløjte	2′
Nasat	1^{1}/_{3}′
Aetheria-Cornet IV	4′
Obo	8′
Tremulant

Pedal C–f^{1}
Subbas	16′
Principal (Gt.)	8′
Bordun (ext. Subbas 16′)	8′
Oktav (Gt.)	4′
Fløjte (Gt.)	4′
Basun	16′
Trompet (ext. Basun 16′)	8′

Tracker key action and couplers, Electrical stop action.
