= Hvidt =

Family name

Origin
- Language: Danish
- Meaning: white
- Region of origin: Denmark

Other names
- Variant forms: Hvid, Hviid

Hvidt is a Danish surname derived from hvid, meaning "white".

Notable people bearing the surname Hvidt include:

- Benjamin Hvidt (born 2000), Danish footballer
- Kasper Hvidt (born 1976), Danish handball player
- Lauritz Nicolai Hvidt (1777–1856), Danish merchant and politician
- Peter Hvidt (1916–1986), Danish architect and furniture designer, co-founder of Hvidt & Mølgaard
