= Esbern Snare =

Danish aristocrat and soldier (1127–1204)

Esbern Snare (1127–1204), also known as Esbern the Resolute, was a høvding, or chieftain, royal chancellor and crusader. His family were members of the powerful Hvide clan. In 1192, during the Crusades and after the fall of Jerusalem, he led a small group of Danish soldiers to the Holy Land. Upon his return, he had the Church of Our Lady, Kalundborg built.

== Early life ==
Born in 1127, Snare was the eldest son of Asser Rig (c. 1080–1151), also called Asser the rich, of the Hvide clan. Esbern's mother, Lady Inge, was the daughter of Eric, the Jarl of Falster and Princess Cecilia Knutsdatter. He was the grandson of Skjalm Hvide and great-grandson of Canute IV of Denmark (c. 1042 – 10 July 1086), the first Danish king (1080–1086) to be canonized.

His family lived in Fjenneslev, Zealand. His brother was Absalon (c. 1128–1201), who became a powerful warrior leader and main advisor to Danish kings, and also Bishop of Roskilde and later Archbishop of Lund. Valdemar I of Denmark was his foster brother. (Note: Valdemar is also said to have been the foster son of Skjalm Hvide (Esbern's grandfather).) His other sibling was Ingefred Assersdatter (c. 1130-1160).

== Marriages and children ==
Esbern was married three times. His first two wives were Holmfred and Ingeborg. His third wife, Helene, was the daughter of a Swedish Jarl, who is presumed to be Guttorm. With Helene, he had a daughter Ingeborg, who married Peder Strangesen (died 1241), who may have been the son of Valdemar. She became the owner of Esbern's castle at Kalundborg. He also had a daughter who married Anders Knudsen Grosøn of Tersløsegaard manor in Sorø.

Esbern gave a farm, Ovre (Aworthe), located in Hvidovre to Sorø Abbey around 1170, and it was later passed on to Absalon. Esbern acquired the farm, Sæbygård, sometime before his death. B.S. Ingemann wrote a poem about Sæbygård and its inhabitants, which is published in his novel, Valdemar Victory.

== Career ==
From "the most powerful family of magnates in the realm", Esbern was a royal chancellor and a høvding (chieftain). He and his brother Absalon had a close relationship, or alliance, with Valdemar. Together, they consolidated the Danish Kingdom.

In 1180, Esbern faced a rebellion because his brother, elected archbishop to the Roskilde see, had brought relatives into powerful positions. Then king, Valdemar interceded to put down the rebellion.

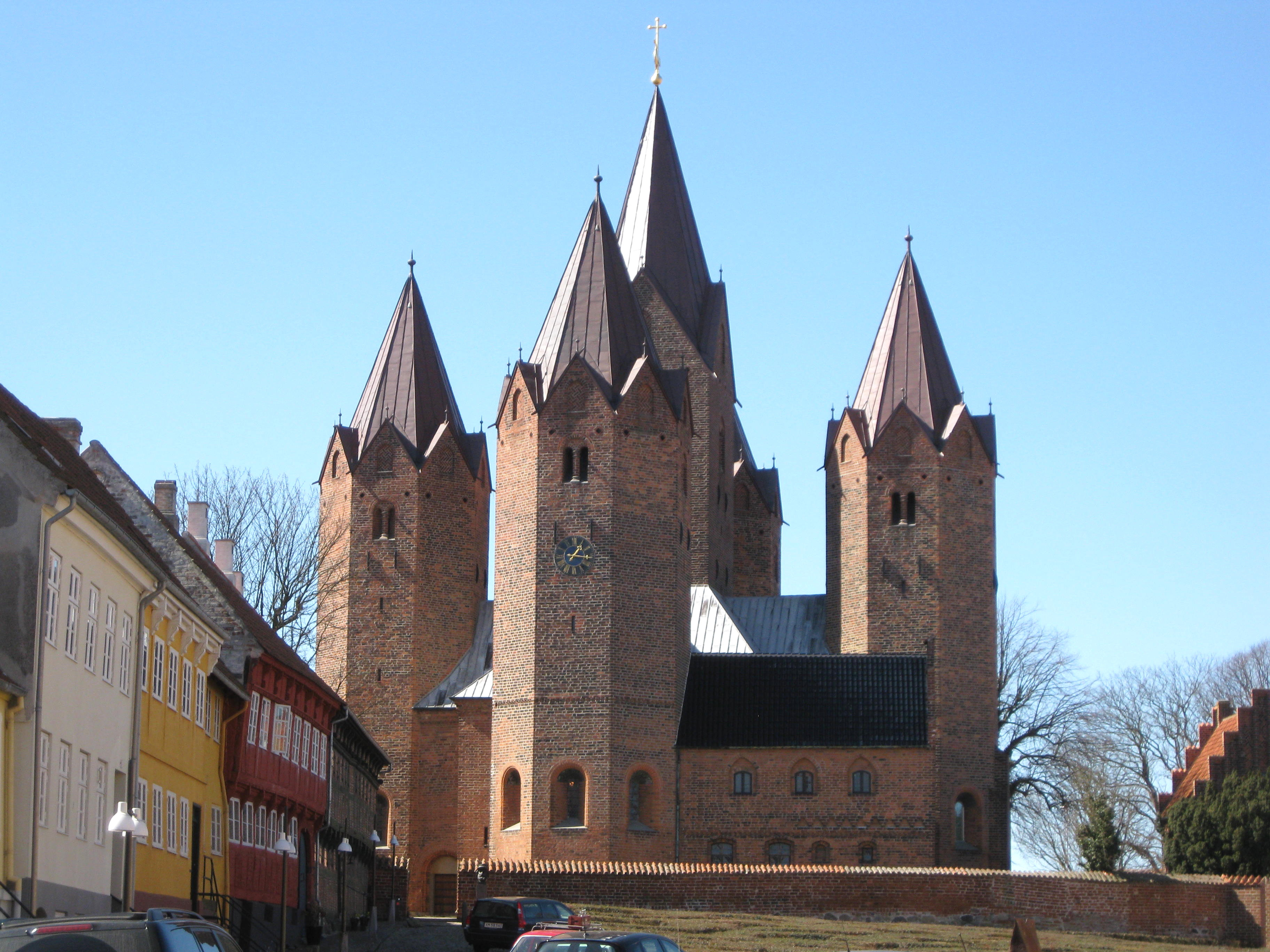
Church of Our Lady, Kalundborg

After the fall of Jerusalem, Pope Innocent III and others asked King Canute VI and the Danes to join the crusade, stating that it would be right for crusaders to die for Christ, as he died for them. This was not well received by the Danes. According to the Historia de Profectione Danorum in Hierosolymam, Esbern delivered a speech stating that the Danish people had been sliding into a period of depravity and decline, he called the crusade to Jerusalem to be of noble effort, as requested by the Pope, who was of a superior position. In 1192, during the Crusades, he led a small group of Danish soldiers to the Holy Land. He became inspired and upon his return to Denmark, he built the Kalundborg Kirke (Church of Our Lady, Kalundborg); Art historian R.A. Stalley called the architectural style an "emphatic image of militant Christianity". (Note: "Militant Christianity" in a directly martial sense, as widely espoused in 12th-century Christendom (see: Crusading movement § 12th century), as distinct from the "Church Militant".) Esbern is considered the founder of the town of Kalundborg.

== Death ==
In 1204, he died at Sæbygård when he broke his neck on a millstone after falling down a staircase. He was buried at Sorø Abbey. After his death, Helene was royal mistress to Valdemar II of Denmark.

== Legacy ==
Two ships of the Royal Danish Navy have been named HDMS Esbern Snare, after Esbern the Resolute:

- HDMS Esbern Snare (F342)
- HDMS Esbern Snare (F341)

== Popular culture ==
- He is the subject of a legend (Fin (legend)) and a later related poem Kalundborg Church by John Greenleaf Whittier.
- B.S. Ingemann wrote a poem about Sæbygård and its inhabitants, which is published in his novel, Valdemar Victory.
