= Hviid =

Hviid is a Danish surname. Notable people with the surname include:

- Bent Faurschou-Hviid (1921–1944), Danish resistance fighter
- Carl Johan Hviid (1899–1964), Danish film actor
- Frederik Hviid (born 1974), Spanish swimmer
- Jørgen Hviid (1916–2001), Danish and Latvian multi-sport athlete, and an officer in the Royal Danish Navy
- Morten Hviid, academic
