= Anders Sunesen =

Danish archbishop

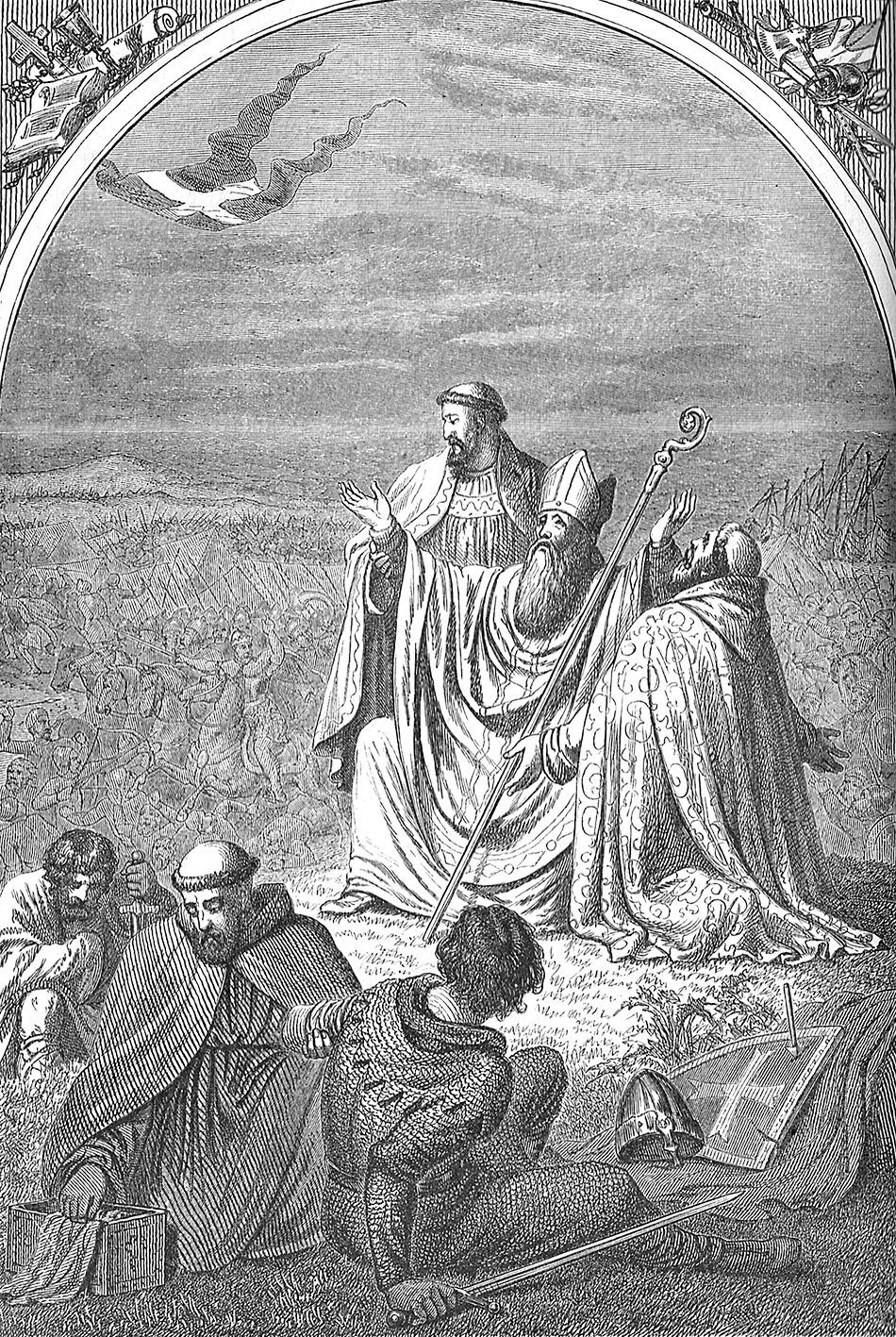
Anders Sunesen in the Battle of Lyndanisse (Tallinn) 1219

Anders Sunesen (also Andreas, Suneson, Sunesøn, Latin: Andreas Sunonis) (c. 1167 – 1228) was a Danish archbishop of Lund, Scania, from 21 March 1201, at the death of Absalon, to his own death in 1228.

He is the author of the Latin translation of the Scanian Law and was throughout his life engaged in integrating a Christian worldview into the old legislature. He managed to introduce tithe (taxation benefiting the church) despite the resistance this measure had met from the population of Scania during Absalon's time, but his efforts to convince the priests of his day about the merits of celibacy was based mostly on his own example and relied on oratory rather than legal maneuvering. To educate the priests and to forward his ideas, especially about the integration between church and state, he wrote a didactic poem, Hexaëmon, consisting of 8,040 verses of Latin hexameter.

A nephew of Absalon and a member of the religious and political elite, Sunesen was well-traveled, having received his education in theology and philosophy in Paris, France, and his legal education in Bologna, Italy and at Oxford, England. His encounter with ideas from the European continent about Christian Crusades were incorporated into his thinking. He led a crusade against Finns in 1202 with his brother and lobbied the Pope for a crusade against Estonians, Livonians and Baltic peoples. He eventually received permission to install a bishop in Reval (Tallinn), and in 1219, he accompanied Valdemar II in his war against Estonia. According to an old Danish myth supportive of Danish expansionism, the Danish flag (Dannebrog) appeared in the sky and fell into the hands of Valdemar II as Sunesen raised his arms and prayed for a Danish victory during the decisive battle.

He lived his last years in northeastern Scania, where he died in 1228 on Ivö Island in Ivö Lake, Scania's largest lake. It has been speculated that his death may have been attributed to leprosy. He is buried in a sarcophagus in Lund Cathedral.
