= Absalon =

Danish bishop and statesman (c. 1128 – 1201)

- Bishop of Roskilde; Archbishop of Lund
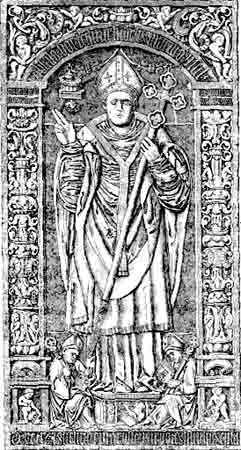
- Absalon's grave effigy
- Diocese: Diocese of Roskilde (1158–1192); Archdiocese of Lund (1178–1201)
- Predecessor: Asser of Roskilde; Eskil of Lund
- Successor: Peder Sunesen (Roskilde); Anders Sunesen (Lund)

Personal details
- Born: c. 1128 near Sorø
- Died: 21 March 1201 (aged 72–73) Sorø
- Buried: Sorø Abbey

Absalon (c. 1128 – 21 March 1201) was a Danish statesman and prelate of the Catholic Church who served as the bishop of Roskilde from 1158 to 1192 and archbishop of Lund from 1178 until his death. He was the foremost politician and church father of Denmark in the second half of the 12th century, and was the closest advisor of King Valdemar I of Denmark. He was a key figure in the Danish policies of territorial expansion in the Baltic Sea, Europeanization in close relationship with the Holy See, and reform in the relation between the Church and the public. He combined the ideals of Gregorian Reform with loyal support of a strong monarchical power.

Absalon was born into the powerful Hvide clan, and owned great land possessions. He endowed several church institutions, most prominently his family's Sorø Abbey. He was granted lands by the crown, and built the first fortification of the city that evolved into modern-day Copenhagen. His titles were passed on to his nephews Anders Sunesen and Peder Sunesen. He died in 1201, and was interred at Sorø Abbey.

== Early life ==
Absalon was born around 1128 near Sorø, Zealand. Due to his name being unusual in Denmark, it is speculated that he was baptized on the Danish "Absalon" name day, 30 October. He was the son of Asser Rig, a magnate of the Hvide clan from Fjenneslev on Zealand, and Inger Eriksdotter. He was also a kinsman of Archbishop Eskil of Lund. He grew up at the castle of his father, and was brought up alongside his older brother Esbern Snare and the young prince Valdemar, who later became King Valdemar I of Denmark. During the civil war following the death of Eric III of Denmark in 1146, Absalon travelled abroad to study theology in Paris, while Esbern fought for Valdemar's ascension to the throne. In Paris, he was influenced by the Gregorian Reform ideals of churchly independence from monarchical rule. He also befriended the canon William of Æbelholt at the Abbey of St Genevieve, whom he later made abbot of Eskilsø Abbey.

Absalon first appears in Saxo Grammaticus's contemporary chronicle Gesta Danorum at the end of the civil war, in the brokering of the peace agreement between Sweyn III and Valdemar at St. Alban's Priory in Odense. He was a guest at the subsequent Roskilde banquet given in 1157 by Sweyn for his rivals Canute V and Valdemar. Both Absalon and Valdemar narrowly escaped assassination by Sweyn on this occasion, and escaped to Jutland, whither Sweyn followed them. Absalon probably did not take part in the following battle of Grathe Heath in 1157, where Sweyn was defeated and slain. This led to Valdemar ascending to the Danish throne. On Good Friday 1158, bishop Asser of Roskilde died, and Absalon was eventually elected bishop of Roskilde on Zealand with the help of Valdemar, as the king's reward for Hvide family support.

== Bishop and advisor ==
Absalon was a close counsellor of Valdemar, and chief promoter of the Danish crusades against the Wends. Earlier Danish monarchs had failed to subjugate or raid the Pomeranian coasts or make themselves a preeminent power even in the region of Rana (Rügen), being successfully repelled and raided in turn. During the Danish civil war, Denmark had been open to coastal raids by the ‘Wends’ (which included pagan Rana and the Christian Duchy of Pomerania).

At the time, it is worth noting that heading great raids was the Christian Duchy of Pomerania (a tributary of the Duchy of Poland) as well as the) who had not long earlier together seized the capital of Roskilde together with them and the Pomeranian Duke’s men pillaged the important port of Kungahälla (concurrently with the Wendish Crusade, besides the pillaging goal also preventing Danish participation on the side of the crusaders, which targeted besides pagan West Slavs also Christian Pomerania and notably besieged the Christian coastal town of Szczecin).

The “Wends” had raided the Danish coasts during the civil war of Sweyn III, Canute V, and Valdemar, and at the accession of Valdemar one-third of Denmark lay wasted and depopulated. Absalon’s goal therefore was to increase and centralise Danish power in the region, against the coast, deterring raids and seizing from rival influence at least the area of the island of Rana, which was an important West Slavic pagan spot (from which at least some of the raiding forces originated, and which was under the influence of Christian coastal rivals).

Absalon formed a guardian fleet, built coastal defenses, and led several campaigns against the Wends. He even advocated forgiving the earlier enemies of Valdemar, which helped stabilize Denmark internally.

=== Wendish campaigns ===
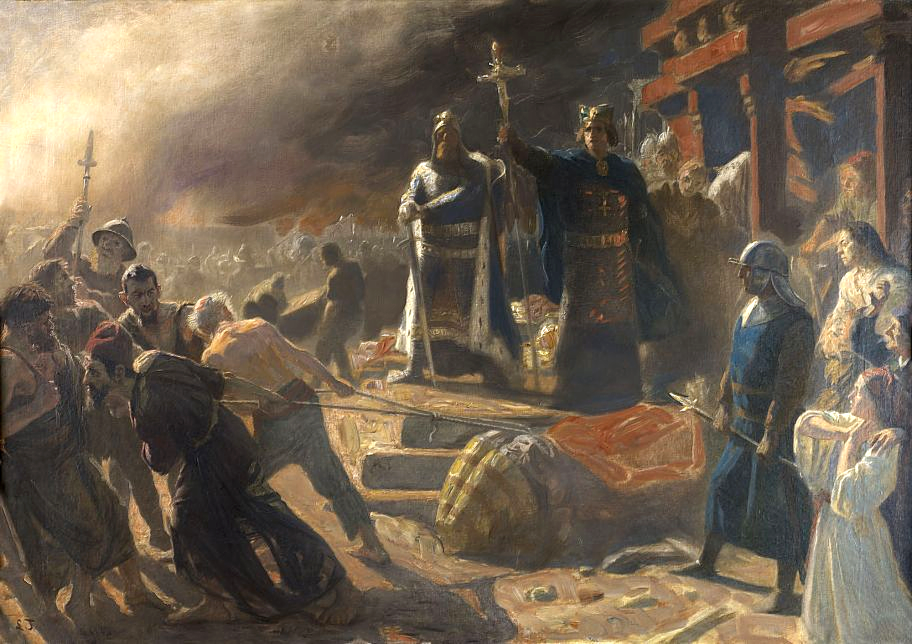
Bishop Absalon topples the god Svantevit at Arkona, as imagined by Laurits Tuxen

The first expedition against the Wends conducted by Absalon in person, set out in 1160. These expeditions were successful, but brought no lasting victories. What started out as mere retribution, eventually evolved into full-fledged campaigns of expansion with religious motives. In 1164 began twenty years of crusades against the Wends, sometimes with the help of German duke Henry the Lion, sometimes in opposition to him.

In 1168 the chief Rana fortress at Arkona in Rügen (or Rana in the local language), containing the sanctuary of their god Svantevit, was conquered. The people of Rana agreed to accept Danish suzerainty and the Christian religion at the same time. From Arkona, Absalon proceeded by sea to Charenza, in the midst of Rügen, the political capital of the Wends and an all but impregnable stronghold. But the unexpected fall of Arkona had terrified the garrison, which surrendered unconditionally at the first appearance of the Danish ships. Absalon, with only Bishop Sweyn of Aarhus and twelve "housecarls", thereupon disembarked, passed between a double row of Wendish warriors, 6000 strong, along the narrow path winding among the morasses, to the gates of the fortress, and, proceeding to the temple of the seven-headed god Rugievit, caused the idol to be hewn down, dragged forth and burnt. The whole population of Garz was then baptized, and Absalon laid the foundations of twelve churches in the isle of Rügen. Rügen was then subjected to Absalon's Bishopric of Roskilde.

One of Absalon's biggest victories, at Julin

The destruction of this chief sally-port of the Wendish raiders enabled Absalon to considerably reduce the Danish fleet. But he continued to keep a watchful eye over the Baltic, and in 1170 destroyed another pirate stronghold, farther eastward, at Dziwnów on the isle of Wolin. Absalon's last military exploit came in 1184, off Stralsund at Whitsun, when he soundly defeated a Pomeranian fleet that had attacked Denmark's vassal, Jaromar of Rügen.

=== Policies ===
Absalon's main political goal was to free Denmark from entanglements with the Holy Roman Empire. Absalon reformed the Danish church organisation to closer match Holy See praxis, and worked to keep Denmark a close ally of the Holy See. However, during the schism between Pope Alexander III and Antipope Victor IV, Absalon stayed loyal to Valdemar even as he joined the Holy Roman Emperor Frederick Barbarossa in supporting Victor IV. This caused a split within the Danish church, as it possibly forced Eskil of Lund into exile around 1161, despite Absalon's attempts to keep the Danish church united. It was contrary to Absalon's advice and warnings that Valdemar I rendered fealty to the emperor Frederick Barbarossa at Dole in 1162. When Valdemar returned to Denmark, he was convinced to strengthen the Danevirke fortifications at the German border, with the support of Absalon.

Absalon built churches and monasteries, supporting international religious orders like the Cistercians and Augustinians, founding schools and doing his utmost to promote civilization and enlightenment. In 1162, Absalon transformed the Sorø Abbey of his family from Benedictine to Cistercian, granting it lands from his personal holdings. In 1167, Absalon was granted the land around the city of Havn (English: "Harbour"), and built there a castle for coastal defense against the Wends. Havn quickly expanded into one of Scandinavia's most important centers of trade, and eventually evolved into modern-day Copenhagen. It was also Absalon who held the first Danish Synod at Lund in 1167. He was interested in history and culture, and commissioned Saxo Grammaticus to write Gesta Danorum, a comprehensive chronicle of the history of the Danes. In 1171, Absalon issued the "Zealand church law" (Danish: Sjællandske Kirkelov), which reduced the number of Canonical Law offenses for which the church could fine the public, while instituting the tithe payment system. Violation of the law was specified as subject to a secular legal process.

== Archbishop of Lund ==
Archbishop Eskil returned from exile in 1167. Eskil agreed on canonizing Valdemar's father Knud Lavard in 1170, with Absalon assisting him at the feast. When Eskil stepped down as Archbishop of Lund in 1177, he chose Absalon as his successor. Absalon initially resisted the new position, as he did not want to lose his power position on Zealand, but complied with Papal orders to do so in 1178. By a unique Papal dispensation, Absalon was allowed to simultaneously maintain his post as Bishop of Roskilde. As the Archbishop of Lund, Absalon utilized ombudsmen from Zealand, demanded unfree labour from the peasantry, and instituted tithes. He was a harsh and effective ruler, who cleared all Orthodox Christian liturgical remnants in favour of Papal standards. A rebellion in the Scanian peasantry forced him to flee to Zealand in 1180, but he returned and subdued the Scanians with the help of Valdemar.

Valdemar died in 1182 and was succeeded by his son, Canute VI, whom Absalon also served as counsellor. Under Canute VI, Absalon was the chief policymaker in Danish politics. Absalon kept his hostile attitude to the Holy Roman Empire. On the accession of Canute VI in 1182, an imperial ambassador arrived at Roskilde to get the new king to swear fealty to Frederick Barbarossa, but Absalon resolutely withstood him.

== Death ==
When Absalon retired from military service in 1184 at the age of fifty-seven, he resigned the command of fleets and armies to younger men, like Duke Valdemar, the later king Valdemar II. He instead confined himself to the administration of the Danish empire. In 1192, Absalon made his nephew Peder Sunesen his successor as Bishop of Roskilde, while his other nephew Anders Sunesen was named the chancellor of Canute VI. Absalon died at Sorø Abbey on 21 March 1201, 73 years old, with his last will granting his personal holdings to the Abbey, apart from Fjenneslev which went to Esbern Snarre. He had already given Copenhagen to the Bishopric of Roskilde. Absalon was interred at Sorø Abbey, and was succeeded as Archbishop of Lund by Anders Sunesen.

== Legacy ==
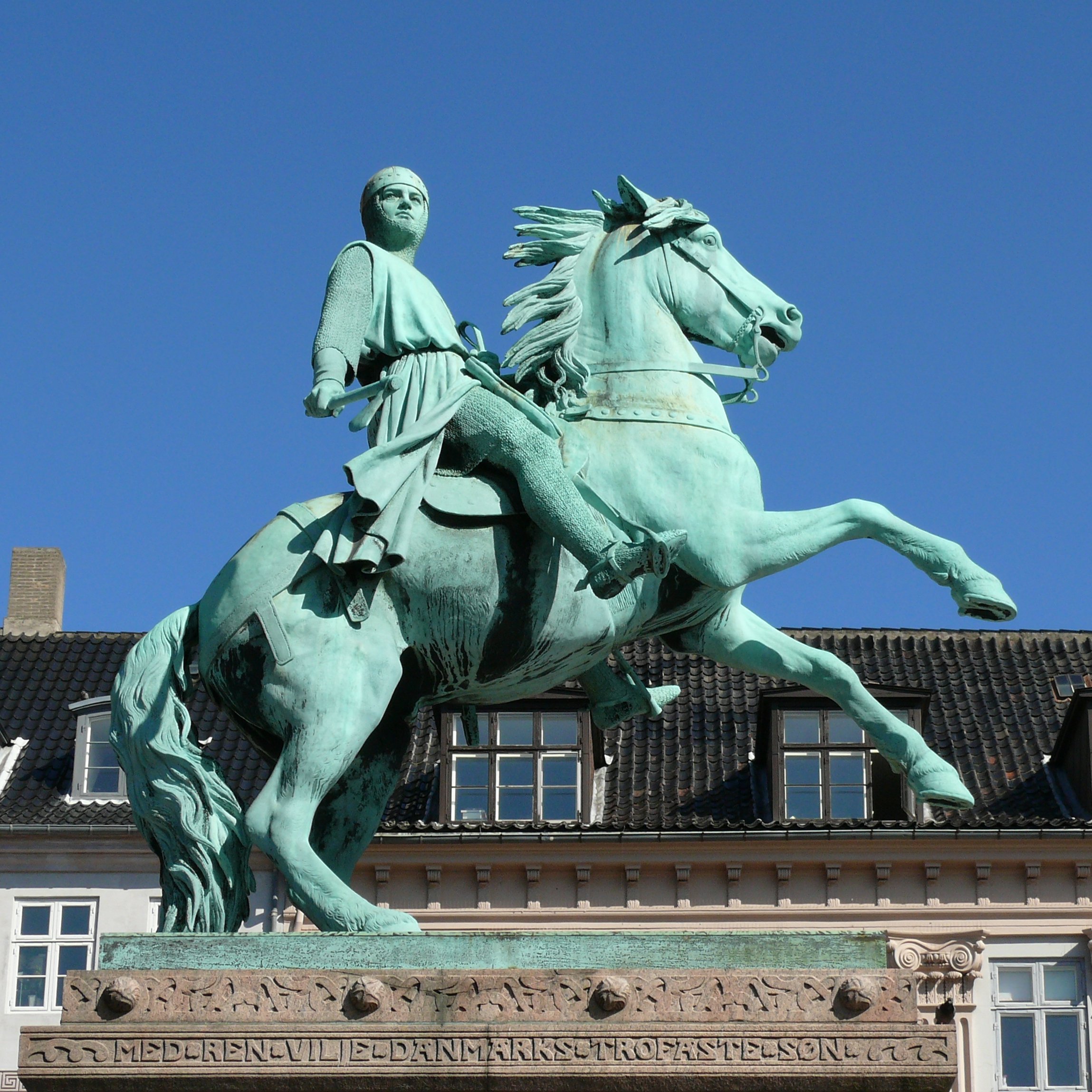
Equestrian statue from 1902 commemorating Absalon on Højbro Plads, Copenhagen

Saxo Grammaticus' Gesta Danorum was not finished until after the death of Absalon, but Absalon was one of the chief heroic figures of the chronicle, which was to be the main source of knowledge about early Danish history. Absalon left a legacy as the foremost politician and churchfather of Denmark in the 12th century. Absalon was equally great as churchman, statesman, and warrior. His policy of expansion was to give Denmark the dominion of the Baltic for three generations. That he enjoyed warfare there can be no doubt; yet he was not like the ordinary fighting bishops of the Middle Ages, whose sole indication of their religious role was to avoid the shedding of blood by using a mace in battle instead of a sword. Absalon never neglected his ecclesiastical duties.

In the 2000s, "Absalon" was adopted as the name for a class of Royal Danish Navy vessels, and the lead vessel of the class. HDMS Absalon (L16) and Esbern Snare (L17) were launched and commissioned by Denmark in 2004 and 2005.
