= Ancient Diocese of Roskilde =

Latin Catholic diocese in Denmark, pre-1022–1537

Diocese of Roskilde Dioecesis Roskildensis Roskilde Stift
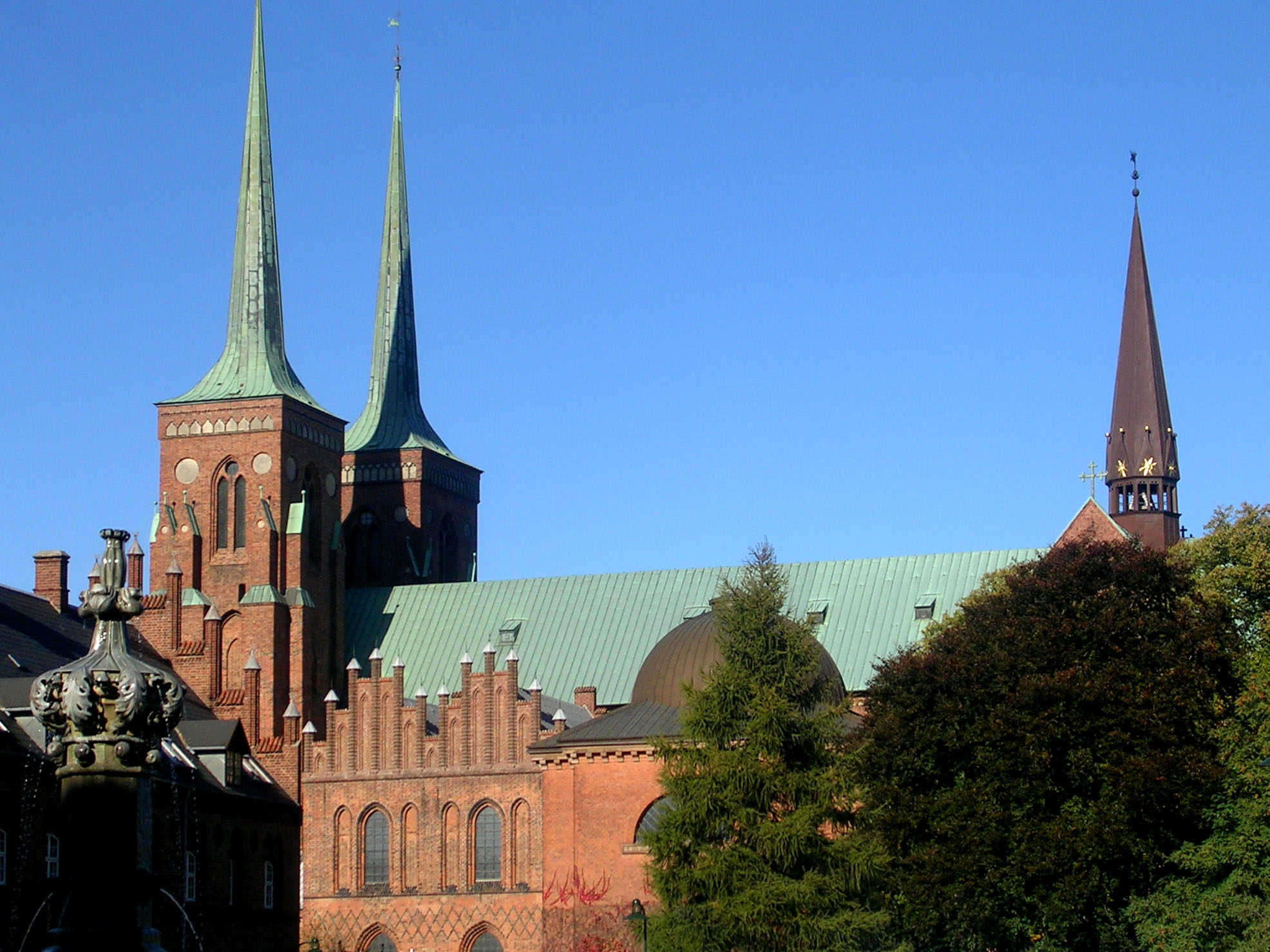
- Roskilde Cathedral, the seat of the Bishop of Roskilde.

Location
- Country: Denmark
- Ecclesiastical province: Lund
- Metropolitan: Archdiocese of Lund

Information
- Denomination: Catholic
- Sui iuris church: Latin Church
- Rite: Roman Rite
- Established: 991
- Dissolved: 1536
- Cathedral: Roskilde Cathedral

The former Diocese of Roskilde (Danish: Roskilde Stift) was a Latin Catholic diocese within the Catholic Church that was established in Denmark some time before 1022. The diocese was dissolved with the Reformation of Denmark and replaced by the Protestant Diocese of Zealand in 1537.

Today, the region once within the Diocese of Roskilde's jurisdiction is part of the Roman Catholic Diocese of Copenhagen. Within the Church of Denmark, the region formerly within the ancient Diocese of Roskilde is today divided between the Diocese of Copenhagen, the "new" Diocese of Roskilde, and the Diocese of Helsingør.

== History ==
The episcopal see of the Bishop was Roskilde Cathedral but from 1167, when Bishop Absalon completed a new bishop's palace known as Absalon's Castle on the small island of Slotsholmen, he resided at the small town of Havn, which later became the present Danish capital Copenhagen.

The diocese originally included both the island of Zealand and Scania (southern Sweden, then part of Denmark), but Scania was disjoined in 1060 and initially divided into the short-lived Diocese of Dalby and the Diocese of Lund, which absorbed the first and became the Metropolitan of (southern) Scandinavia.

== List of bishops of Roskilde ==
- c. 1022–1029/30 Gerbrand (da)
- c. 1030–late 1050s Avaco/Aage
- c. 1060–1073/74 William of Roskilde
- 1074–1088 Svend Nordmand
- 1088–1124 Arnold
- 1124–1134 Peder
- 1134–1137 Eskild
- 1137–1138/39 Ricco/Rike
- 1139–1158 Asker/Asser
- 1158–1191 Absalon
- 1191–1214 Peder Sunesen
- 1214/15–1224/25 Peder Jacobsen
- 1225–1249 Niels Stigsen
- 1249–1254 Jakob Erlandsen
- 1254–1277 Peder Bang
- 1278–1280 Stig (uncertainty regarding name)
- 1280–1290 Ingvar (uncertainty regarding name)
- 1290–1300 Johannes/Johan/Jens Krag
- 1301–1320 Oluf
- 1321–1330 Johan/Jens Hind
- 1330–1344 Johan/Jens Nyborg
- 1344–1350 Jacob Poulsen
- 1350–1368 Henrik Gertsen
- 1368–1395 Niels Jepsen Ulfeldt / Niels Jacobsen Ulfeldt
- 1395–1416 Peder Jensen Lodehat
- 1416–1431 Jens Andersen Lodehat
- 1431–1448 Jens Pedersen Jernskæg
- 1449–1461 Oluf Daa
- 1461–1485 Oluf Mortensen Baden
- 1485–1500 Niels Skave
- 1500–1512 Johan Jepsen Ravensberg
- 1512–1529 Lage Jørgensen Urne
- 1529–1536 Joachim Rønnow
