= 12th century in Denmark =

- Other centuries
- 11th century | 12th century | 13th century

Events from the 12th century in Denmark.

== Monarchs ==
- Eric I, 1095–1103
- Niels, 1104–1134
- Eric II, 1134–1137
- Eric III, 1137–1146
- Sweyn III and Canute V, 1146–1157
- Valdemar I, 1154–1182
- Canute VI, 1170–1202

== Events ==
- 7 January 1131 – Canute Lavard is assassinated after being lured into a forest by Magnus the Strong. Soon after, Eric II amasses forces to avenge his half-brother's death, resulting in the Battle of Jellinge Heath and the outbreak of the Danish Civil Wars.
- 1131–1132 – Supporters of Magnus the Strong lay Siege to Schleswig.
- 1132 – Eric II's forces defeat supporters of Magnus the Strong in the naval Battle of Sejerø.
- 1133 – Magnus' supporters defeat the forces of Eric II and conquer Zealand at the Battle of Værebro.
- 4 June 1134 – Eric II's forces are victorious against supporters of Magnus at the Battle of Fotevik.
- 1134 – Pomeranian forces invade and loot Roskilde and Copenhagen.
- 23 October 1157 – the Danish Civil War ends following the Battle of Grathe Heath. Valdemar I becomes undisputed king of Denmark.
- 1147 – Danish forces attack Dobin am See as part of the Wendish Crusade.
- 1168 – Valdemar I and his army attack Rügen. Overthrowing the Rani's autonomy, destroying a Svetovid temple, and installing Christian princes.

== Births ==
- 1127 – Esbern Snare (died 1204)
- 14 January 1131 – Valdemar I of Denmark (died 1182)
- 1158 – Valdemar Knudsen (died 1236 in Cîteaux)
- 28 June 1170 – Valdemar II of Denmark (died 1241)
- 1174 – Ingeborg of Denmark, Queen of France (died 1237 in France)

Date unknown

- c. 1100 – Saint Kjeld (died c. 1150)
- c. 1106 – Magnus the Strong (died 1134 in Scania)
- c. 1118 – Christina of Denmark, Queen of Norway (died 1139)
- c. 1120 – Eric III of Denmark (died 1146)
- c. 1125 – Sweyn III of Denmark (died 1157)
- c. 1128 – Absalon (died 1201)
- c. 1129 – Canute V of Denmark (died 1157)
- c. 1135 – Helen of Sweden
- c. 1145 – Christina Hvide (died c. 1200)
- c. 1150 – Saxo Grammaticus (died c. 1220)
- c. 1165 – Benedicta Hvide (died c. 1199 in Sweden)
- c. 1167 – Anders Sunesen (died 1228)
- c. 1180 – Helena of Denmark (died 1233 in Lüneburg)
- c. 1190 – Rikissa of Denmark, Queen of Sweden (died 1220)

== Deaths ==
- 10 July 1103 – Eric I of Denmark (born c. 1060, died in Cyprus)
- 1103 – Boedil Thurgotsdatter, Queen consort (died in Jerusalem)
- 1104 – Svend Tronkræver
- 7 January 1131 – Canute Lavard (born 1096)
- 4 June 1134 – Henrik Skadelår (born c. 1090)
- 25 June 1134 – Niels, King of Denmark (born c. 1063)
- 1134 – Bjørn Haraldsen Ironside
- 1135 – Harald Kesja (born c. 1080)
- 18 September 1137 – Eric II of Denmark (born c. 1090)
- 27 August 1146 – Eric III of Denmark (born c. 1120)
- 16 January 1151 – Hermann of Schleswig
- 1151 – Asser Rig (born c. 1078)
- 9 August 1157 – Canute V of Denmark (born c. 1129)
- 23 October 1157 – Sweyn III of Denmark (born c. 1125)
- 1176 – Margrethe of Roskilde
- 1180 – Niels of Aarhus
- 12 May 1182 – Valdemar I of Denmark (born 1131)
- 1 June 1197 – Gertrude of Bavaria
- 5 May 1198 – Sophia of Minsk, Queen consort

Date unknown

- c. 1100 – Svend Høra
- c. 1113 – Skjalm Hvide
- c. 1131 – Cecilia Knutsdatter (born c. 1083)
- c. 1150 – Saint Kjeld (born c. 1100)
- c. 1157 – Inger Eriksdotter
- c. 1170 – Wetheman
