= Valdemarian Age =

Period in Danish history between 1157 and 1241

- 1157–1241
Civil War Era	Codex Holmiensis
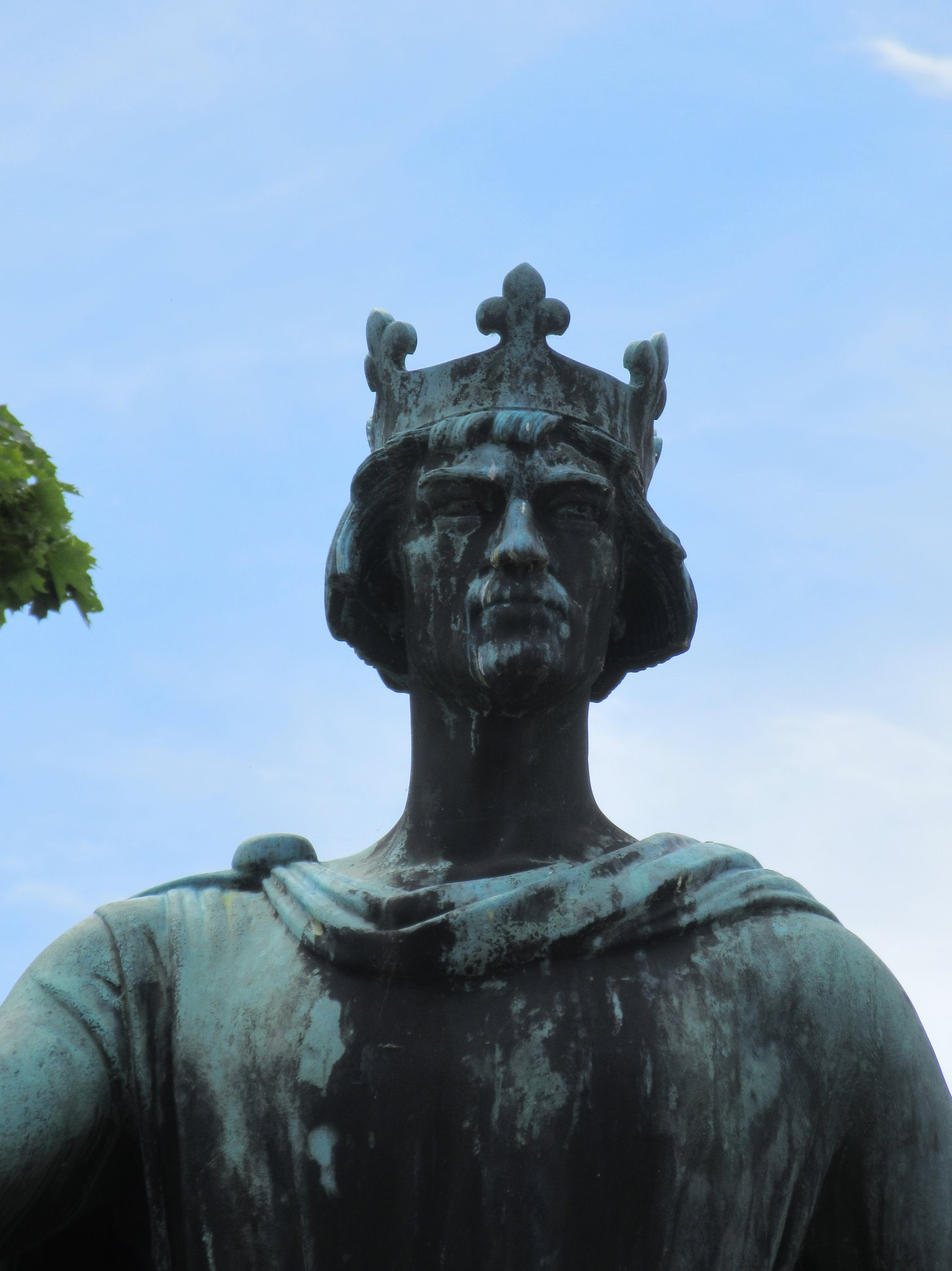
- Statue of Valdemar the Great from 1937, located near St. Bendt's Church, Ringsted
- Monarch(s): Valdemar I Canute VI; Valdemar II Junior-kings: Valdemar III (Note: Not to be confused with Valdemar of Schleswig); Erik IV

The Valdemarian Age (Danish: Valdemarstiden) commonly also referred to as the Valdemars (Danish: Valdemarene) refers to an 84-year long period in Danish history between 1157 and 1241, beginning with the reign of Valdemar I, and ending with the death of Valdemar II. The period is heavily centered around the Danish Crusades in the Baltic Sea.

== Danish Civil War and background ==
From 1047, Denmark was ruled by the House of Estridsen. Sweyn II of Denmark and his five reigning sons had ruled Denmark for 87 years. (Note: Sweyn II reigned from 1047–1076, Harald Hen from 1076–1080, Canute IV from 1080–1086, Olaf I from 1086–1095, Eric I from 1095–1103 and Niels from 1104–1134.) The last of these rules, Niels of Denmark, gave his nephew, Canute Lavard, the Duchy of Schleswig as his vassalage in 1115.

Canute was to protect the southern border from foreign, and mostly Slavic, attacks. He fulfilled this duty so well that he was titleized Duke of Holstein and became a vassal of the Holy Roman Emperor. Additionally, in 1127 he became sovereign over the Western Wends. Canute's increasing position and influence threatened the Danish heir, Magnus the Strong, who in 1131 assassinated Canute in the Haraldsted Forest.

This assassination resulted in a Danish Civil War, which would ultimately turn in favor of the contender, Eric II. Eric II was succeeded by his nephew, Eric III, who abdicated due to health problems. This resulted in strife for the throne and three men now contested the throne; Sweyn, Canute and Valdemar. The former being the son of Canute Lavard.

Feud of 1146–1157

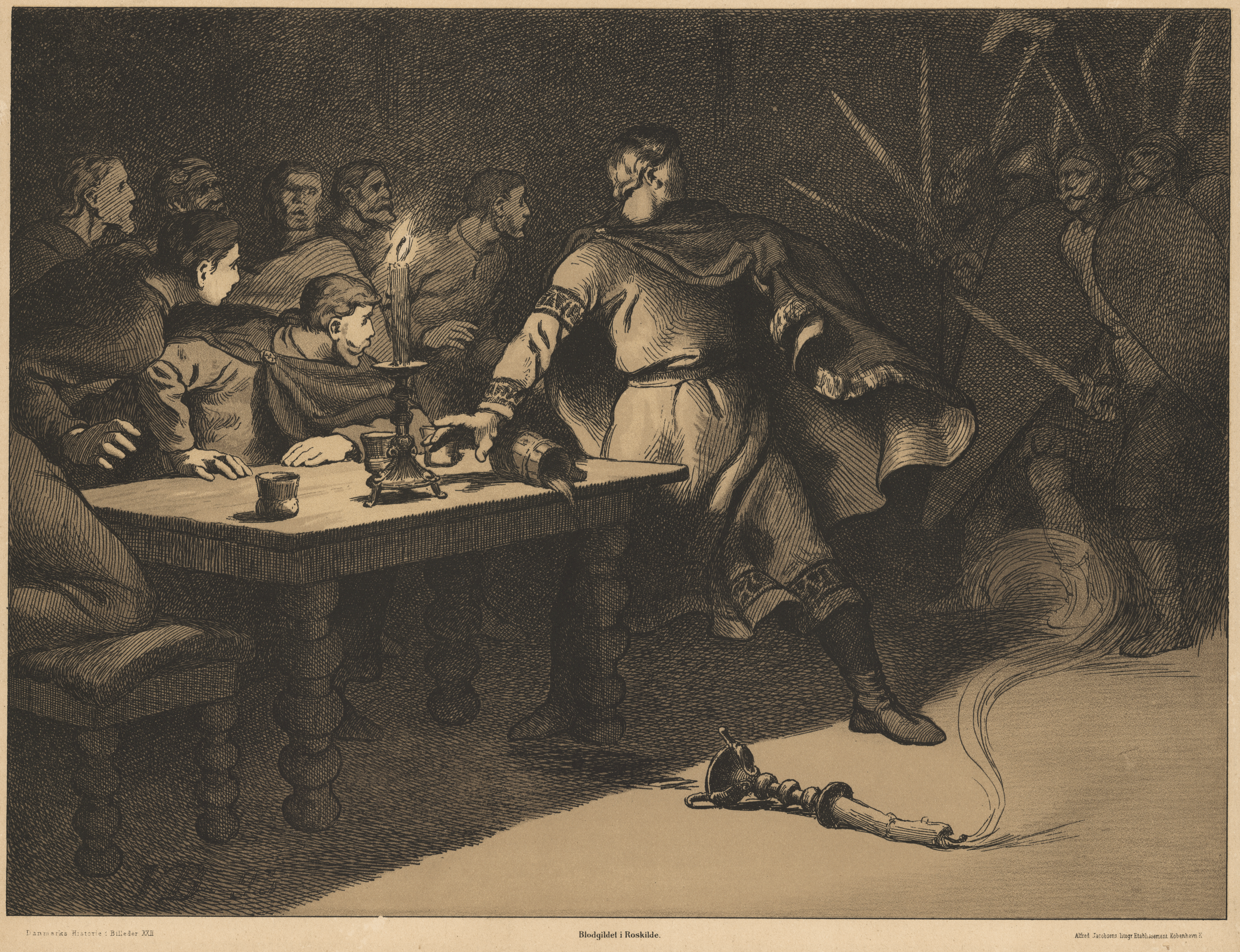
Blood-feast of Roskilde Alfred Jacobsen (1973)

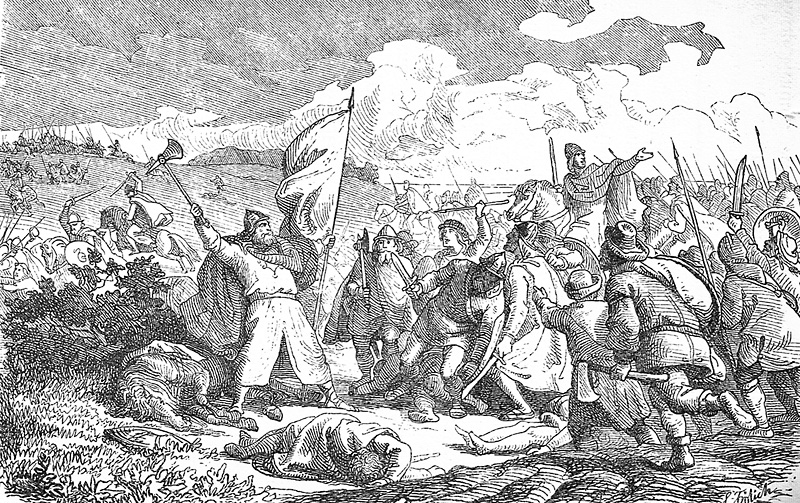
Battle of Grathe Heath Lorenz Frølich (1885)

Sweyn was the strongest of the contenders and received support from the majority of the nobles. Valdemar and Canute had consequently allied, and Valdemar became co-ruler in 1156. Peace negotiations began in Spring 1157. An agreement was made to divide Denmark into three parts: Valdemar was to have Jutland, Canute was to have Funen, and Sweyn was to have Zealand and Scania. To celebrate the deal, Sweyn hosted a feast in Roskilde, yet during this feast his men murdered Canute and wounded Valdemar, in what would later known as the Bloodfeast of Roskilde (Danish; Blodgildet i Roskilde).

After the murders, Valdemar fled to Viborg and gathered Canute's followers to engage in battle against the pursuing Sweyn. The opposing forces met at Grathe Heath, where Valdemar's considerably smaller force defeated Sweyn, who, according to legend, was killed by an angry peasant while fleeing from battle.

== Reign of Valdemar I the Great ==
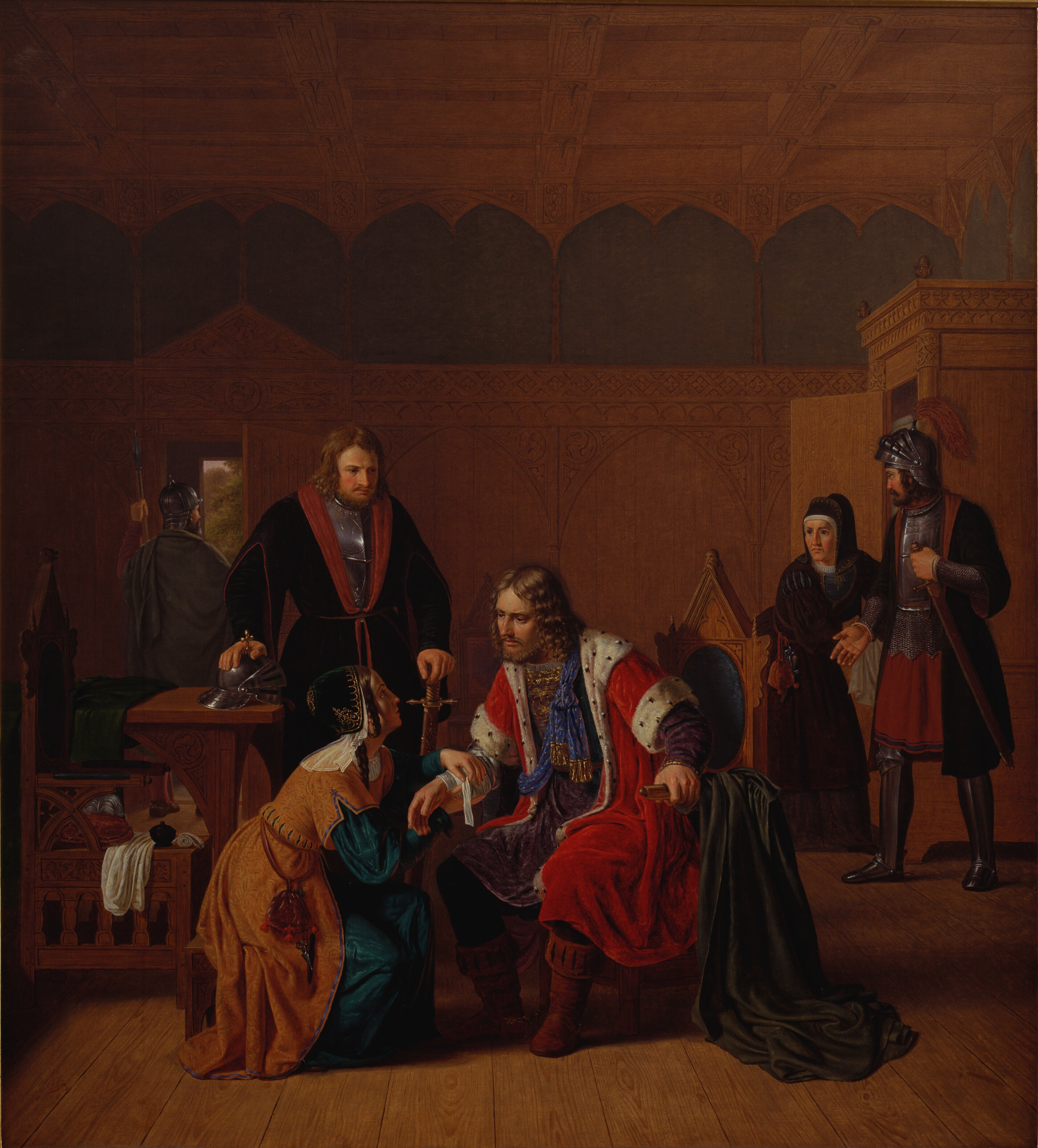
Valdemar the Great is welcomed at Absalon's mother's house, where he sought refuge after the Blood-feast of Roskilde Peter Raadsig (1821–1840)

During the Danish civil war, Sweyn III was said to have allied with the pagan Wends against his rivals for the throne. Valdemar, being hostile to the wends, saw an opportunity for Christian expansion. He and bishop Absalon send a fleet against the pagan Rügen. The Danes then plundered the settlement and destroyed the statue of Svetovit first chopping its four heads of, then burning it. Rügen was conquered and converted, and Valdemar returned home to Denmark.

Valdemar's reign started with heavy domestic opposition. Both Erik Lamb’s son, Magnus Eriksen, and Henrik Skadelår’s son, Buris, lead rebellions in Denmark. These rebellions were easily defeated. A later rebellion in Scania did lead to a major battle at Dösjebro. The Scanians, being heavily outgunned, were defeated in the Battle of Dösjebro. Valdemar's reign saw Canute Lavard declared as a Saint and Absalon recognized as the rightful Archbishop by Eskil of Lund. Valdemar's reign saw economic upsurge where the population increased and foreign trade developed.

== Reign of Cnut VI ==
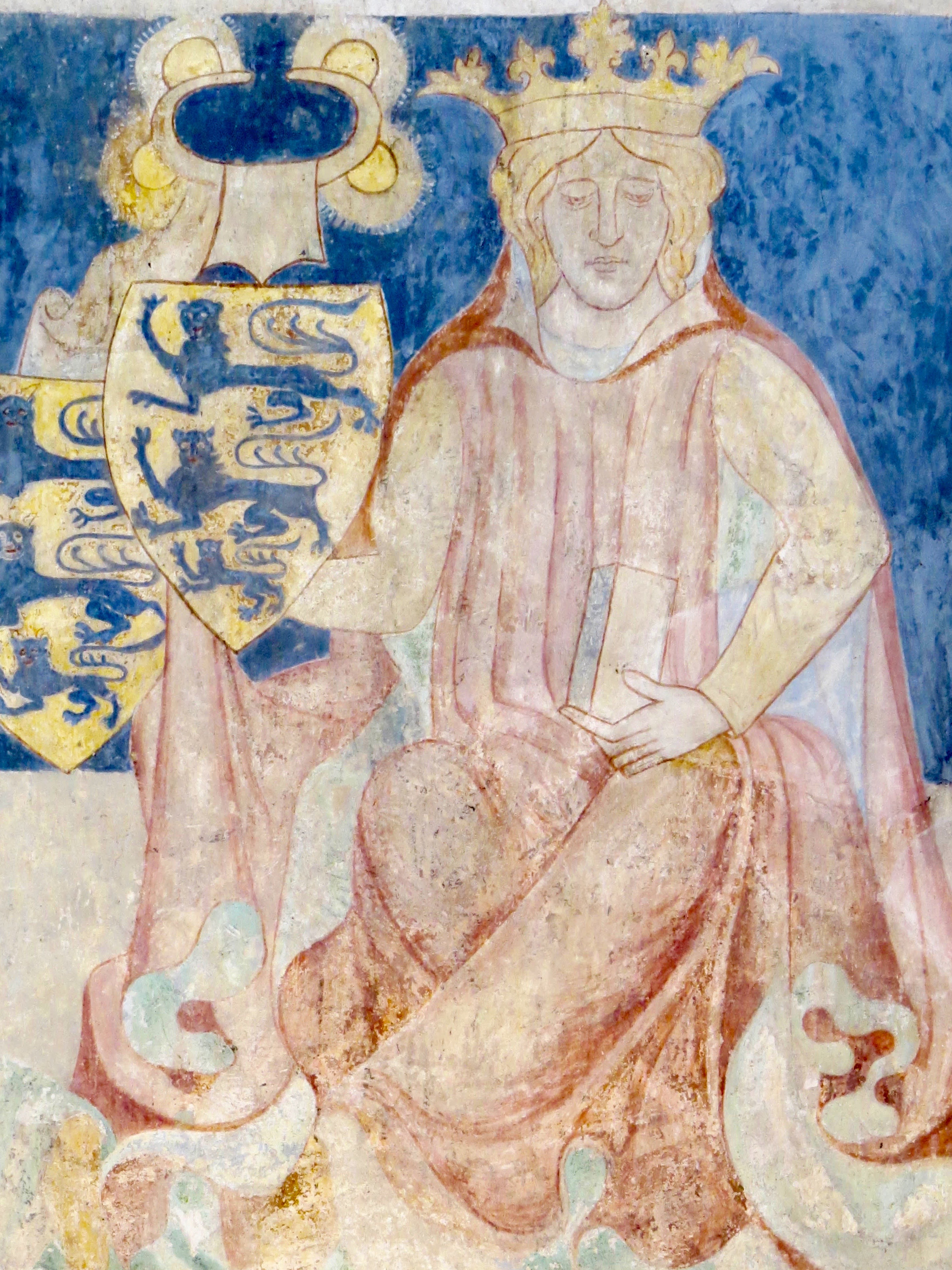
Painting of Canute dated to 1260 in St. Bendt's Church, Ringsted

Cnut VI was born in 1163 to Valdemar I and Sophia of Minsk. He was confirmed co-king by his father in 1165 and later too in 1170. He became sole king in 1182 after his father’s death.

In 1184, the Holy Roman Emperor, Frederick Barbarossa, sent a messenger to confirm Canute as his vassal. Canute refused this, with Absalon declaring Canute as a “free and sovereign king, just like the emperor”. Frederick, being enraged by this, send his vassal, Bogusław, to invade Denmark. Canute was in Jutland at that time, therefore Absalon had the responsibility to meet the Pomeranian fleet. Absalon succeeded in capturing 35 Pomeranian ships with only seven of his own ships being captured. Canute then ordered two invasions of Pomerania and Bogusław was forced to pay homage to Canute. Canute took full control of Pomerania, with him taking the title King of the Wends to further emphasize his rule. A failed rebellion in 1189 would lead to further suppression of the Pomeranians.

He would soon acquired the Slavic territory of Mecklenburg and the holdings of German frontier princes, thereafter adding Slavorumque rex (King of the Slavs) to his regal title. After 1192, Danish policy towards the south was conducted by Canute's brother Valdemar, who extended Danish territories to beyond the Oder and in Holstein.

Canute strengthened Denmark's role in European politics by having his sister, Ingeborg, marry the French king, Phillip II, in return for some Danish support in his war against England and a 10,000 silver mark dowry. The marriage was strained, and Phillip almost immediately asked for an annulment. Cnut refused this and send a delegation to Pope Celestine III, asking him not to annul it. She would continue to be Phillips wife for the rest of his life.

Canute also lead crusades to both Finland and Estonia. These crusades did not lead to any major settlements and was mostly overshadowed by his younger brother's later crusades in 1207 and 1219.

== Reign of Valdemar II ==
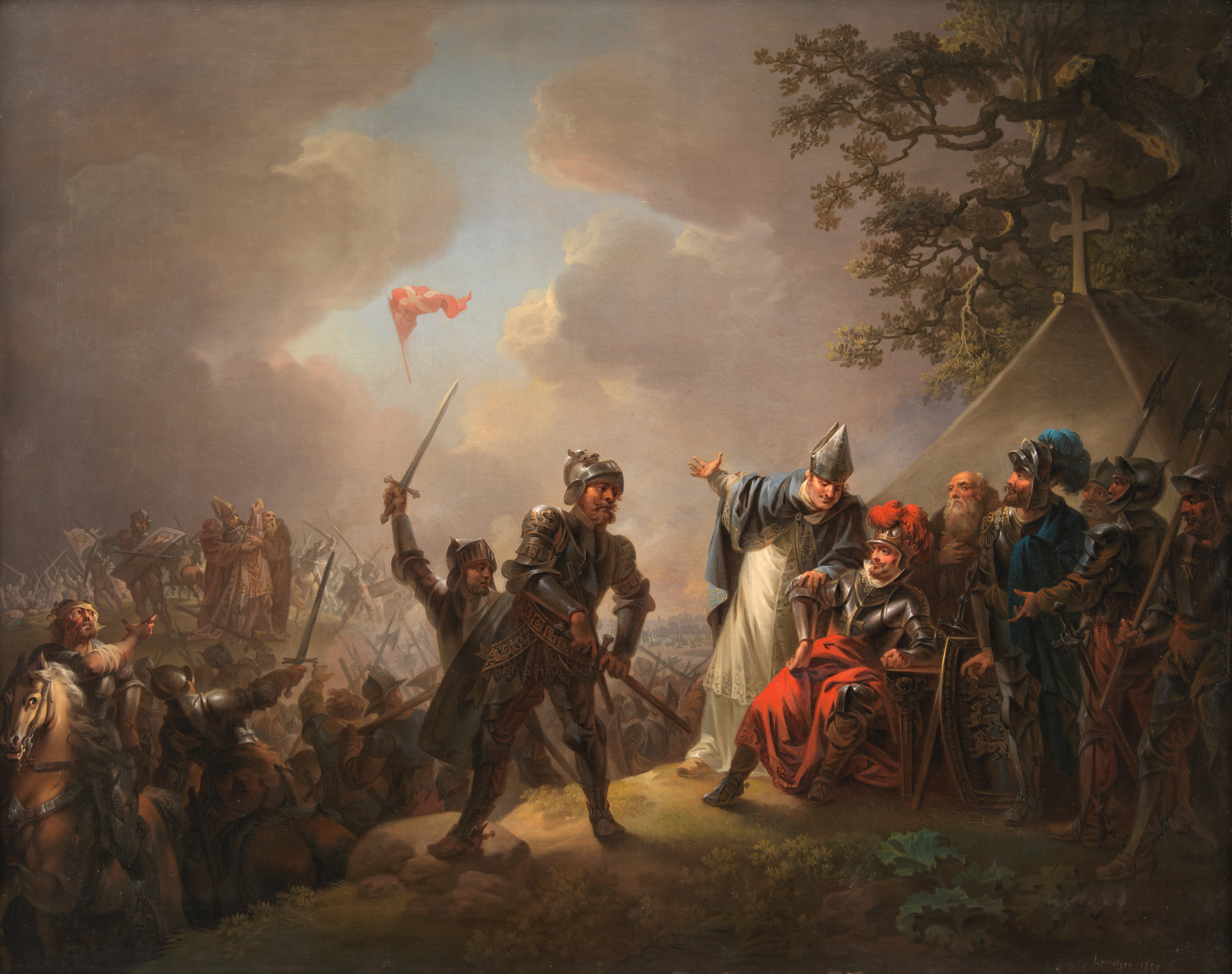
Dannebrog falling from the sky during the Battle of Lindanise Christian August Lorentzen (1809)

Valdemar was born in 1170 and made king in 1202. He was made Duke of Schleswig. This led to a conflict with the regent of Schleswig, Valdemar Knudsen. Duke Valdemar win this, and imprisoned the bishop for 14 years until he was released and exiled to Rome. Another rebellion was launched by Adolf III of Holstein. This was defeated in 1202 in the Battle of Stellau, where Adolf was deposed and his entire army annihilated.

The conditions in the Holy Roman Empire was were ripe for Danish expansion, mostly because the states were unorganized and in infighting with each other. Valdemar then took on an expansionist policy against his German neighbors, conquering Lübeck, Hamburg, and all the way to Gdańsk with the conquest of Pomerania.

One of his conquests is especially known in Danish history. Valdemar embarked on a crusade against the pegan Estonias, where Valdemar would fight a battle in Tallinn. It went bad at first, but Estonia was eventually conquered with the help of Divine intervention, when god supposedly send down the Flag of Denmark.

King Valdemar went on a hunting trip with his son Valdemar the Young, where they would be captured. The conditions for his release was that the Danish border would once again be at the Eider. Valdemar went on a revenge campaign two years later. He would be defeated in the battle of Bornhöved, where his Baltic empire would be forever lost. Valdemar died a few months after he signed the code of Jutland.
