= Danish Civil Wars =

Series of civil wars in Denmark in 1131–1157

Danish Civil War
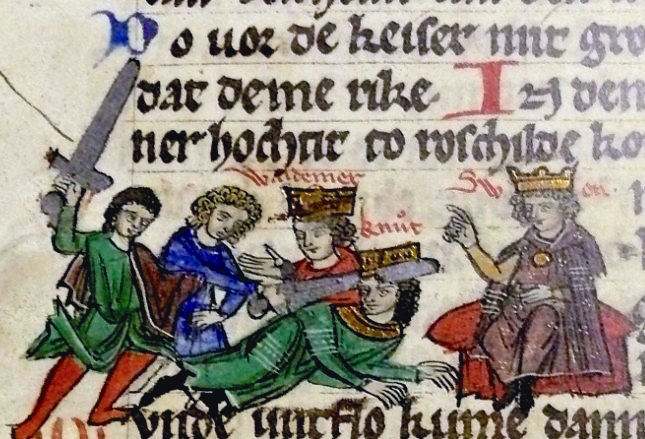
- Scene from the Blood Feast in Roskilde. Canute is chopped down and Valdemar is attacked, while Sweyn with a royal crown follows.
Date	1131–1134; 1139–1143; 1146–1157
Location	Jutland, Zealand, Scania, Slesvig and Holstein
Result	Valdemar I of Denmark becomes King of Denmark

Belligerents
1131–1134; Eric II of Denmark	1131–1134; Niels of Denmark; Magnus the Strong; Harald Kesja
1139–1143; Eric III	1139–1143; Olaf Haraldsen
1146–1147; Canute V	1146–1147; Sweyn III; Valdemar I
1147–1154; Canute V Sverker I of Sweden	1147–1154; Sweyn III; Valdemar I
1154–1157; Canute V Valdemar I Sverker I of Sweden	1154–1157; Sweyn III
1157; Valdemar I Sverker I of Sweden	1157; Sweyn III

Commanders and leaders
Eric II of Denmark X	Niels I of Denmark X Magnus the Strong †; Harald Kesja (executed)
Eric III of Denmark	Olaf Haraldsen †
Canute V X Valdemar I Sverker I of Sweden	Sweyn III †

The Danish Civil Wars (Danish: Kongekrigene, Norwegian: De danske kongekrige) were a series of civil wars fought in the Kingdom of Denmark, first from 1131 to 1134 over the murder of Canute Lavard, then from 1139 to 1143, and finally a war of succession fought from 1146 to 1157, after the abdication of Eric III of Denmark, the first monarch in Danish history to have abdicated. The first phase of the war was fought between King Eric II of Denmark and King Niels joined by Magnus the Strong. The second phase of the war was fought between the son of Magnus the Strong, Canute V of Denmark, the son of Eric II of Denmark, Sweyn III of Denmark, and his cousin Valdemar I of Denmark, son of Canute Lavard. The civil wars marked an increase in the influence of the Holy Roman Empire in Denmark, and for a time after, Denmark was a vassal state of Emperor Frederick I. The war ended with the deaths of seven kings. Two of the kings, Olaf Haraldsen and Magnus the Strong, are not amongst the official Danish line of kings. The other kings are Niels I, Eric II, Eric III, Canute V and Sweyn III.

== Background ==
In the 11th century, Denmark had historically been an elective monarchy, and even though for the most part the eldest would inherit, it still left the possibility of succession crises. Sweyn II Estridsen would end up fathering sixteen sons, of which five would sit on the throne: Harald III, Canute IV, Olaf I, Eric I, and Niels. In the 30 years of Niels' reign, 26 would be in relative peace and prosperity. He was known for his frugality and piety, even among his critics such as Saxo Grammaticus. He granted his nephew, Canute Lavard, the title of Duke of Schleswig and gave him further opportunities to expand his domain. Canute distinguished himself in this role, as he was not only able to defend the southern border, but he was also able to subjugate the Obotrites. Canute was renowned for his charisma, chivalry and honour, and is remembered as a virtuous and modest man. He was also a strong candidate for being the next king, as he enjoyed support from the powerful house of Hvide, who raised him, and from Holy Roman Emperor Lothair III, who granted him the title Duke of Holstein for his campaigns against the Wends. King Niels and Canute had a cordial relationship, however relations between Canute and the son of Niels, King Magnus the Strong of the Geats, (Note: Magnus is often listed as King of Sweden, however it is unclear if he was ever king of all Sweden and not just Götaland. His title was also disputed with Ragnvald Knaphövde until Ragnvald's death.) were colder.

== Feud of 1131–1134 ==
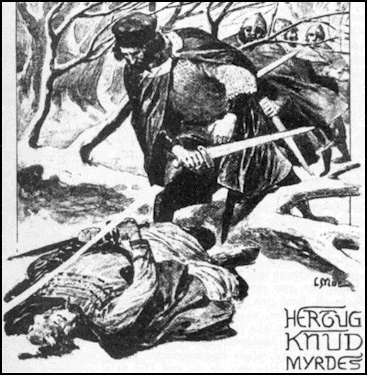
The murder of Canute Lavard as depicted by Louis Moe around 1898

On 7 January 1131, Magnus lured Canute Lavard into the Haraldsted Forest, a little north of Ringsted, where he was murdered. Soon after, civil war broke out when Canute Lavard's half-brother, Eric II, gathered his late brother's levies to avenge him. Eric demanded that Magnus be brought to justice for the murder of his brother or the king would face open revolt. His forces stopped not far from Jelling, by the Bishop of Ribe, who urged patience and insisted on the king's innocence. This was all a ruse, however, as King Niels was able to gather the support of the Jutlandic nobles, and rout the forces of Eric completely at the Battle of Jellinge Heath. Eric was therefore forced to flee east, leaving southern Jutland defenseless. Without any aid Southern Jutland surrendered swiftly, meanwhile Eric II traveled to the Holy Roman Empire to gain the support of Holy Roman Emperor Lothair III. Lothair III marched north with an army of 6000 men, joined by a naval force under Eric to relieve the city of Schleswig from a siege. During the ensuing battle, Lothair deserted after coming to an agreement with Magnus and Niels in which they agreed to pay a large sum of money and abandon Lund as an independent archdiocese and place it under Hamburg-Bremen. Eric II managed to convince a force under Adolf II of Holstein to stay, but they were still decisively defeated by forces under Magnus the Strong. Despite these heavy defeats, the continued support of the nobles of Zealand, such as the Hvides and Peder Bodilsøn, would cause figures such as the Archbishop of Lund, Asser Thorkilsson, as well as several members of the Jutish nobility, to swing over to Eric II's side. With the open revolts to the north, Niels split his forces and named Magnus commander of the navy. Niels planned to crush the rebels in the north while aiming for Magnus to destroy Eric and his fleet. Magnus searched for some time along the coast of Zealand, however, after finding little he relaxed his search. Eric seized the opportunity and almost completely annihilated Magnus' fleet at the Battle of Sejerø. Eric's navy then raided along the Limfjord, landing many troops around Himmerland and sacking Viborg, where the local bishop Eskild– a supporter of Niels– was murdered during his morning service in the year 1132.

Eric hoped to finally defeat Niels now with the help of Christian Aggesen, who had raised a large force in the north, but it had been intercepted at Rynebjerg, where Niels outnumbered them and had the element of surprise. Not letting the chance slip by him, as Eric's raids in Jutland made locating him easy, Niels marched his army swiftly and took Eric's entire embarked force by surprise. Eric was once again defeated decisively and was almost captured. By this point Eric had lost all semblance of power on Jutland and Funen, moreover the only real advantage that Eric had left, his navy, was in a shambles. Additionally, Eric's brother Harald Kesja and his sons revolted on the side of Niels and Magnus on the condition that Harald be elected co-king. Eric quickly levied another army, and began besieging Haraldsborg, however this was a strong fortress and unlike ideal sieges, time was not on Eric's side. Fortunately for him, some German merchants in Roskilde aided in crafting siege weapons, and Eric would employ trebuchets for the first time in Scandinavian history, finally breaking through and butchering the garrison. However, Harald had escaped, and soon after Niels invaded Zealand with a large army and 100 ships. At the ensuing Battle of Værebro Eric lost his foothold on Zealand, earning the nickname "Harefoot". Eric then fled to Scania, where he desperately tried to get support. However, Archbishop Asser, still ignorant of Niels' deal with the Holy Roman Emperor, convinced the Scanians to finally desert Eric who went into exile in Norway.

When Asser finally caught wind of the secret deal between Niels and the Emperor he switched sides, rallying thousands of Scanians to Eric's cause, leading Eric to return to Eastern Denmark. Possessing several hundred veterans of his campaigns and 300 mounted knights from the Emperor, Eric prepared to attack. At the Battle of Fodevig, on the second day of Pentecost 1134, Niels, Magnus the Strong and Harald Kesja, all co-kings with an enormous army at their backs landed on the Fotevik, in a daring amphibious assault. However, with the use of the Holy Roman Emperor's heavy cavalry, Eric was able to decisively defeat them. Magnus was killed in the battle along with several bishops who supported Niels' and Magnus' cause. After the battle Eric II's nickname 'Harefoot' was replaced with the more flattering nickname 'the Memorable'. Niels fled to Jutland after the battle, where still he had support. The 70-year-old king was on his way south, for reasons unknown, when in Schleswig– Canute Lavard's old stronghold– he was attacked and killed by the city's citizens. While for the most part the civil war had ended, Harald Kesja continued fighting, seeing himself as the sole legitimate king after the death of King Niels. But in 1134, Eric II captured and beheaded Harald Kesja and had seven of his sons killed, except for Olaf Haraldsen who escaped the massacre. By 1137, Eric II was forced to flee as his old strongholds of Zealand and Scania had grown hostile towards him, and he fled to Jutland, where he was murdered.

== Feud of 1139–1143 ==
Eric II would be succeeded by his nephew Eric III. Contemporary chroniclers highly disagree about the personality of Eric III, and he is portrayed both as a passive and irresolute man, as well as an eager and brave fighter. In 1139, Olaf Haraldsen raised an army and launched an attack on Zealand, killing the Bishop of Roskilde, Rike. Despite getting support from some, such as Occo of Schleswig, and being hailed King of Scania, he had little control and was unable to gain the support of Archbishop Eskil of Lund. In 1143, Eric managed to defeat Olaf in battle outside of Helsingborg, and he ruled peacefully for the rest of his reign until his abdication in 1146.

== Feud of 1146–1157 ==
Upon the abdication of Eric III, Sweyn III of Denmark was elected King of Denmark on Zealand, but with the support of Eskil of Lund, Canute V of Denmark was also able to get elected in Skåneland. Canute was able to rally an army, but his invasion of Zealand was repelled by Sweyn III at a battle near Slangerup. In 1147, Canute and Sweyn called a truce so they could participate in the Wendish Crusade, but they returned early after being defeated by Niklot soon after landing.

Canute launched another campaign on Zealand, taking Roskilde, but Sweyn, with the help of his cousin Valdemar I of Denmark, would once again defeat Canute near Taastrup in 1149–1150. For Valdemar's contributions he was made Duke of Schleswig. In 1151, Canute would be defeated once again, near Viborg. In 1152, a German-sponsored compromise was proposed, which would have made Canute and Sweyn co-regents, but the deal was refused by Sweyn. Around 1152–1153, Canute would enlist the help of his uncle Sverker I of Sweden, and would engage in another battle at Viborg, at which he would be decisively defeated. Sweyn had taken control of most of Denmark, and he had established himself as the sole king of Denmark. A defeated Canute fled to Saxony, but fighting still continued against Sweden.

In 1153–1154 Valdemar switched sides and became co-regent along with Canute V, and the two of them were able to expel Sweyn from the kingdom by 1155. In the winter of 1156 Sweyn returned with German reinforcements with the intent to retake Denmark, but peace negotiations began in spring of 1157. An agreement was made to divide Denmark into three kingdoms: Valdemar was to have Jutland, Canute was to have Funen, and Sweyn was to have Zealand and Skåneland. To celebrate the deal, Sweyn hosted a feast in Roskilde, but during the feast his men murdered Canute and wounded Valdemar in what would be known as 'The Blood Feast of Roskilde'. Valdemar fled to Viborg and gathered Canute's followers to have a battle against the pursuing Sweyn. They met at the Battle of Grathe Heath where Valdemar's much smaller force defeated Sweyn, who according to legend, was killed by an angry peasant while fleeing.
