= Siege of Schleswig =

The siege of Schleswig
- Part of The Danish Civil War
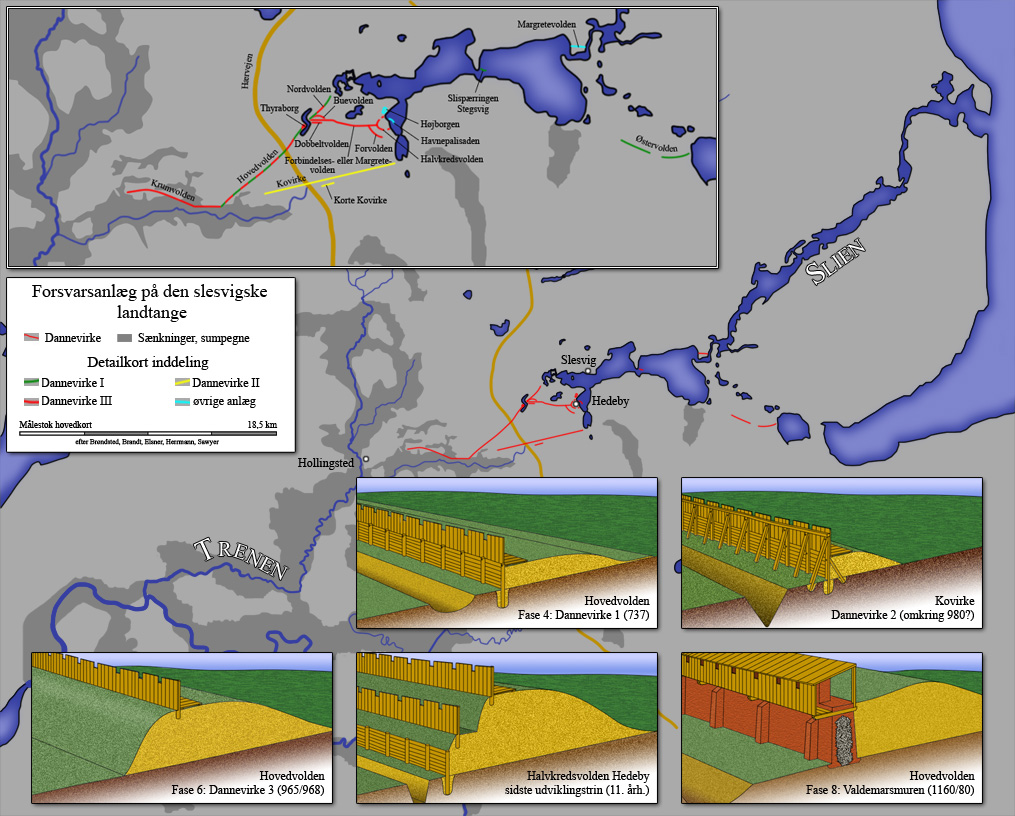
- The Dannevirke and Slesvig
Date	Autumn 1131–Spring 1132
Location	Jelling, Denmark
Result	Party of Niels-Magnus victory

Belligerents
The Eric Ericson party County of Holstein	The Niels-Magnus party

Commanders and leaders
Eric II of Denmark; Adolf II of Holstein	Niels I of Denmark; Magnus the Strong

Strength
2,000–3,000 Holsatians; ~30 Danish ships ~1000 Danes	~4,000

Casualties and losses
Very Heavy	Minor losses

The siege of Schleswig took place from 1131–1132 during the Danish Civil Wars. It saw forces under the Eric II of Denmark, Holy Roman Emperor Lothair III, and Adolf of Holstein face off against Niels I of Denmark and his son Magnus the Strong of Götaland. Eric failed to break the siege, as he was deserted by Lothair III after he came to an agreement with Magnus and Niels. Only Adolf of Holstein remained with Eric, but his forces were destroyed trying to cross the Eider.

== Background ==
Since the Carolingian Empire, the security of Southern Jutland had been of great importance to the security of Denmark as a whole. Therefore, around 800 the border would be transformed into a range of dikes and fortresses known as the Danevirke. Additionally, Denmark had tried to keep good relations with its southern neighbor, Holy Roman Empire, to add further security. Canute Lavard, the Duke of Schleswig, was on very good terms with the Holy Roman Empire, and after his campaign against the Obotrites, Lothair III granted him the title of the Duke of Holstein. Because of this, when Magnus the Strong murdered Canute Lavard it was taken as an attack on the Holy Roman Empire. Niels and Magnus aimed to take control of Jutland to secure the southern border and the Danevirke, and to this end they defeated Eric at Jellinge Heathe. After the battle, Niels gathered more forces in the northern parts of Jutland while his son Magnus marched south with a large force. Eric, quickly recuperating from his earlier defeat, gathered his navy and sailed for his half-brothers capital of Schleswig, which commanded the crossing of the Danevirke.

== The siege ==
It seems all forces were racing for Slesvig, as all armies arrived shortly within the time of the others. Magnus the Strong came first, he quickly manned the Dannevirke, had the dikes expanded, ordered wooden palisades built, together with other defensive works, Eric, who arrived shortly after, only had naval superiority and so had no real way of dislodging his foes. The forces of Niels reinforced his son, which halted the attack of Lothair III, who had recently crossed the Eider river with 6000 men, among them a large Holsatian force commandeered by Adolf II. With near parity in number and the rumblings of rebellion to the south, Lothair judged it wisest to treat with Niels and Magnus. Magnus and Niels gave in to many demands from the Emperor, making them vassals, and paying a heavy fine. The treaty was soon ratified, however a secret part of the treaty would resubjugate the Danish church to that of Bremen. An enraged Eric sailed for Lothair's camp, where he insulted and shamed the Emperor. Lothair promised future aid, however, and Eric managed to convince Adolf II of Holstein to stay, likely committing to a joint attack. When forces of Adolf crossed the Eider, they were quickly pinned down by Magnus and many of his soldiers were killed or drowned. Eric's had attempted breakthrough also failed miserably, and with his forces completely defeated, he decided to hunker down for the winter, with any hope of holding onto Schleswig lost. What few ships he had left were hemmed in by the winter, as the Fjords froze completely. At the beginning of spring, Eric and a few of his retainers managed to escape, but Niels and Magnus soon after finished the siege, completing their conquest of Jutland.

== Aftermath ==
The siege was a heavy defeat for Eric, as Niels gained complete control of Jutland and Funen. He had also secured the southern border through his agreement with the Holy Roman Emperor, letting him focus his forces on the east. Niels now needed only to consolidate his position and cross the Danish Straits. Although the siege was a victory, it was also in many ways a political blunder. Asser Thorkilsson, the Archbishop of Lund, later learned of the secret provision of the treaty subjugating his Archdiocese to Bremen, and as a result would switch sides and play a pivotal role in Eric's eventual victory.
