= Battle of Sejerø =

Naval battle fought near Sejerø, Denmark

The Battle of Sejerø
- Part of The Danish Civil War
Date	1132
Location	Sejerø, Denmark
Result	Party of Eric Ericson Victory

Belligerents
Forces of Eric	Forces of Magnus

Commanders and leaders
Eric II of Denmark	Magnus the Strong

Strength
~120–240	~100–200

Casualties and losses
Minor	All but one

The battle of Sejerø was a naval battle fought in 1132, near the Island of Sejerø by the Zealandic coast. A zealandic and scanian fleet under Eric II fought a jutlandic fleet under Magnus the Strong. Eric defeated Magnus completely, all that was salvaged from the defeat was the boat Magnus escaped in, the battle was the first defeat dealt to the Niels-Magnus party.

== Background ==
After the murder of Canute Lavard, Eric Ericson Canutes brother marched on Jelling to seek retribution, Erics force was ambushed by King Niels I, and then Eric declared himself the rightful King of Denmark. After fleeing from Jutland with what remained of his army he tried to reconquer south jutland, but was repulsed during the Siege of Schleswig. Niels then prepared a great invasion fleet to take Zealand, however Christian a lord of Jutland joined forces with Eric and rebelled. Niels split his army in two and had his son lead this half to conquer Zealand while he ended the rebellion in the north, Magnus manned as many ships as possible with the forces he had and sailed for Zealand, however Eric had already landed around Sejerø.

== The Battle ==
Magnus had never commanded a fleet before and this was telling, his fleet was disorganized and spread out, some ships in front of others. When Eric caught wind of this he rallied his men giving inspiring speeches and promising victory, Eric would not assail all of Magnus fleet at once but would destroy portions of the fleet as it arrived, therefore he ordered attacks on the isolated frontal portions, defeating each part in detail. Alas when Magnus caught wind of this, he acted decisively, he immediately anchored and lowered his sails, he gathered his entire fleet packing it tightly. However Eric now outnumbered Magnus, and as their formation was so tightly packed and all their anchors lowered, Eric could delay the melee with the enemy raining projectiles at his enemy with relative impunity, then his forces easily outmaneuvered and surrounded the weary fleet of Magnus - melee ensued. Even though the fighting was tough, the outcome of the battle was obvious, so the greatest warriors in Magnus fleet pushed towards were the fighting was fiercest and pulled their king away from the frontlines of the carnage, in last charge the Housecarls managed to break through this "siege", every single ship but the one in which Magnus escaped was captured or destroyed.

== The Aftermath ==
Eric had won a great victory, and began plundering northern Jutland, with his ships, hereafter he would land on the shores of Jutland once more, an army at his back fully intending on putting an end to the war, if Erics forces could consolidate with Christians, they could likely crush Niels in the field. Eric had now regained much of the honor he had lost, however he had still not managed to defeat Niels and as Magnus did not set sail with all of the Jutland fleet, Niels could still salvage the situation.

== Sources ==
Grammaticus, Saxo (1898). Gesta Danorum. Copenhagen: A. Christiansens Kunstforlag
