= Harald of Denmark =

Harald of Denmark - may refer to:

- Harald I of Denmark, better known as Harald Bluetooth
- Harald II of Denmark
- Harald III of Denmark
- Harold Harefoot
- Harald Kesja
- Prince Harald of Denmark
- Harald Skrænk, pretender to the Danish throne, alleged illegitimate son of Olaf (II) Haraldsen
