= Kalmar Expedition =

1123 crusade in the Swedish province of Småland

- Part of Northern Crusades
| Date | 1123 |
| Location | Småland and Öland |
| Result | Crusader victory |

Belligerents
| (Kingdom of Norway (872–1397)) Kingdom of Norway | Norse pagans |

Commanders and leaders
| (Kingdom of Norway (872–1397)) Sigurd the Crusader | |

The Kalmar Expedition (Norwegian: Kalmar leidangen, Swedish: Kalmare ledung) was a sea-based crusade or leidang led by the Norwegian king Sigurd the Crusader performed in 1123 to christianize the region of Småland in Sweden.

The crusade can be dated relatively accurately with information from Snorri Sturluson stating that the crusade must have taken place in the summer before the "great darkness". On 11 August 1124, a solar eclipse occurred, which means that the crusade most likely took place during the period June–August 1123.

While the rest of Sweden had become at least Christian by appearance by the 1080s, the province of Småland had experienced very little contact with Christianity and remained openly pagan in the 1120s, with the inhabitants still openly worshiping the Norse gods. Sigurd the Crusader made a pact with King Niels of Denmark to perform a crusade against Småland and force Christianity upon the pagans. There is no mention of a Swedish king even though the crusade took place against a nominally Swedish province, and the Danish king was married to a Swedish princess, Margaret Fredkulla. The 1120s was a period of political instability in Sweden and the dates of the kings Inge the Younger, Ragnvald Knaphövde and Magnus the Strong are unconfirmed. The Danish king did not follow the agreement and never participated in the crusade, but the Norwegian king performed the leidang in 1123.

Contemporary Swedish sources do confirm warfare between pagans and Norwegian crusaders in the southeastern corner of Småland and on the island of Öland. The Norwegian crusader army reportedly successfully forced the inhabitants to submit to Christianity and brought 1500 cattle and many valuables with them back to Norway.
