= Ulv Galiciefarer =

Danish jarl famous for raiding Galicia in the 11th century.

Ulv Galiciefarer (also known as Galicieulv (Galiciwolf) c. 1000 / 1010), aka Jarl Galizur-Ulfric, was a Danish jarl, a Viking chieftain who became famous for his raids, looting and pillaging the lands of Galicia in the early eleventh century, perhaps in 1028 or 1048, during the reign of Bermudo III and Ferdinand I of Leon. According to Saxo Grammaticus and the Knýtlinga saga, Galicieulv was grandfather of Boedil Thurgotsdatter, the wife of Eric I of Denmark.

== Biography ==
The Knýtlinga saga is one of the main sources on his life. It states that he left "bravely with his westward to conquer Jakobsland" (the land of Santiago de Compostela). Most likely he was devoted to raiding and plundering with relatively little opposition. Some legends claim that he served as a mercenary for Galician count Rodrigo Romániz, in the assault on Labio Castle, near present-day Lugo, over the riots against Bermudo III. Ulf also helped Romariz against the Basque, achieving victory. The raids continued until Ulf was expelled by bishop Cresconius' troops, but not before looting Redondela monastic communities as on the islands of San Simón, Cíes and Toralla enclosures. After his expulsion, the Viking attacks on Galicia fell sharply.

== Family ==
According to Saxo Grammaticus, Úlfr (Old Norse: Wolf) was of noble family. It is speculated that he was the son of Ulf the Earl.

He married when young Bothild Håkonsdatter (b. 1014), daughter of the Earl of Lade Håkon Eiriksson. They had a son, Thurgot Fagrskinna Ulfsen (n. 1032). Turgot would become Count Palatine (Leibhauptman des Königs). Turgot's daughter, Boedil Thurgotsdatter married the Danish King Eric I of Denmark. The couple died on a pilgrimage to the Holy Land. However, his son, Prince Knud Lavard became Duke of Schleswig.
