= Battle of Jellinge Heath =

The Battle of Jelling
- Part of The Danish Civil War
Date	1131
Location	Jelling, Denmark
Result	Party of Niels-Magnus victory All of Jutland subjugated

Belligerents
The Eric Ericson party	The Niels-Magnus party

Commanders and leaders
Eric II of Denmark	Niels I of Denmark

Strength
~3,000	~1,500

Casualties and losses
~1,000	Minor losses

The Battle of Jellinge Heath took place late in the year 1131 near the town of Jelling, on the Jutland peninsula. A Zealandic and south Jutlandic army led by Eric II of Denmark fought a north Jutlandic army under King Niels I of Denmark. Niels defeated the army of Eric and then subjugated the Duchy of Southern Jutland, the duchy of Eric's late brother.

== Background ==
After the murder of Canute Lavard in Haraldsted forest, Magnus the Strong was presumed the murderer and fled to his holdings in western Sweden. This all but confirmed his guilt to Eric, half-brother of Canute, who demanded retribution from King Niels, when Niels not only denied this demand, but also relieved Magnus of his exile, Eric gathered his forces and sailed for presumably Schleswig where he combined forces with those of Southern Jutland and marched north towards Jelling, the so-called baptismal certificate of Denmark. Magnus the Strong had given concessions to the Holy Roman Empire, such as making the Archdiocese of Bremen-Hamburg suzerain of the Scandinavian church. But he had the emperors support, this essentially confirmed his claim on the danish throne even though Eric was the closest relative of the late Eric the Good.

== The battle ==
Eric set up camp not far from Jelling, as he received the bishop of Ribe, he insisted that a peaceful solution could still be met, on this Eric gave the bishop reason and instead of taking Jelling he remained encamped until a solution had been made. Saxo Grammaticus writes "He first went to Jutland with the warriors he had summoned to command. As he advanced in an organized military way, Bishop Thord of Ribe met him, and in false and cunning words he assured him that the king was quite innocent, and promised that in future he would certainly keep his oath." Eric encamped on the heath not far from Jellinge. For his naivety Eric would face a severe lesson, as he was encamped on a hill not far from Jelling. The scouts of King Niels informed him of Eric's positioning, Niels rallied his men and assaulted the unsuspecting forces of Eric. The fighting did not last long as Eric's men were routed and he was forced to flee Jutland with his tail between his legs.

== Aftermath ==
With Erics forces completely routed, King Niels would be able to secure Southern Jutland, thereby the Dannevirke would fall into their hands securing the Danish border with the Empire, likely the greatest threat to the reign of Niels. Eric was humiliated, and even though much of the country supported his claim, he would be unable to reconquer the southern provinces for the rest of the war. Eric stopped any legal pretensions regarding the death of his brother, Eric would retreat to Zealand and be crowned king, the Danish civil war had officially begun.
