= Boedil Thurgotsdatter =

Queen of Denmark from 1095 to 1103

Queen consort of Denmark
- Tenure: 1095–1103
- Died: 1103
- Burial: Mount of Olives, Jerusalem
- Spouse: Eric I of Denmark
- Issue: Canute Lavard (1096–1131), prince and Catholic saint
- Father: Thurgot Fagerskind
- Mother: Thorgunna

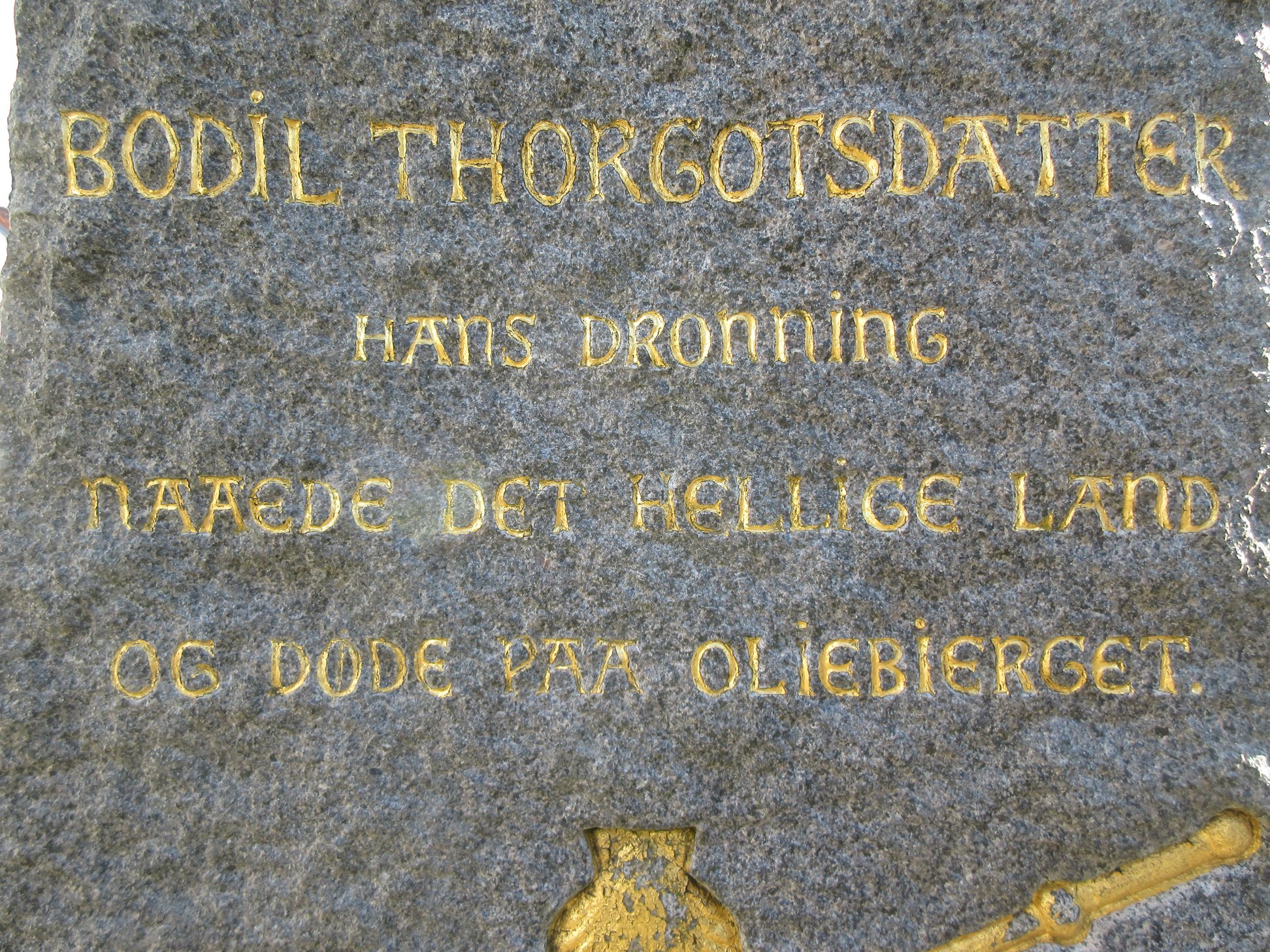
1886 memorial stone in Slangerup

Boedil (Bodil) Thurgotsdatter (died 1103) was a Danish queen, queen consort of King Eric I of Denmark.

== Biography ==
Boedil was the daughter of the Danish Earl Thurgot Fagerskind and Thorgunna and the sister of Svend Thrugotsen. Her grandfather, called Galicieulv in the Knytlinga Saga, was famous as a pilgrim to Santiago de Compostela in Spain. Her family is believed to be connected to the viking families in Northumberland in England, and as a queen, she is listed as a benefactor to the bishopric of Durham. Both she and her spouse were descendants of king Sweyn I of Denmark.

She is believed to have been married to Eric before 1086, as she and her husband lived in exile in the Swedish court during the reign of King Olaf of Denmark (1086–1095). Contemporary chronicles praise her beauty and character. Saxo praised her for her tolerance of her husband's constant adultery, and it was claimed that she even helped to do the hair for his mistresses.

In about the year of 1100 she accompanied her husband on his pilgrimage to Jerusalem. He travelled by horse, and she by carriage. Eric became sick and died of fever in Paphos in 1103, but Bodil continued on the pilgrimage and managed to reach Jerusalem later that year. She died there, and was buried on the Mount of Olives, or at its foot in the Valley of Josaphat.

== Later status ==
In 1170, king Valdemar introduced Christian succession to the kingdom of Denmark, and Boedil was declared the only "true wife" of her spouse and the mother of the ruling house of Denmark, and she was given a saintly appearance as such. According to the law of the church, however, her marriage would still have been illegal, as she and her spouse were related, which was therefore long ignored in history, and she was long portrayed as a half sister to the German Roman emperor Henry, and as such was to have been taken as a war prize by Eric. This history revision can be seen as a sign of the new law which separated the status of children born in and out of wedlock.

== See also ==
- Asser Thorkilsson (fl. 1089 – 1137), nephew (son of her brother, Svend Thrugotsen)

== Sources ==
- Artiklen Bodil i Dansk Biografisk Leksikon (Danish)
- Bodil ( – 1103) i Dansk Kvindebiografisk Leksikon (Danish)

Boedil Thurgotsdatter Born: 11th century Died: 1103
Preceded by Ingegerd of Norway	Queen consort of Denmark; 1095–1103	Succeeded by Margaret Fredkulla
