= Queen Margaret of Denmark =

Queen Margaret of Denmark may refer to:

- Margaret Fredkulla (1080s–1130), wife of king Niels of Denmark
- Margarethe of Bohemia (1186–1212), aka Queen Dagmar, first wife of Valdemar II of Denmark
- Margaret Sambiria (1230–1282) of Pomerelia, wife of king Christopher I of Denmark
- Margaret I of Denmark (1353–1412), wife of Haakon VI of Norway, daughter of Valdemar IV of Denmark, mother of Olaf II of Denmark, also ruled Scandinavia as de facto queen regnant
- Margrethe II of Denmark (b. 1940), head of state of Denmark 1972-2024
