= Battle of Værebro =

- Part of The Danish Civil War
Date	1133
Location	Jelling, Denmark
Result	Niels-Magnus party victory All of Zealand subjugated

Belligerents
Forces of Eric	Forces of Magnus

Commanders and leaders
Eric II of Denmark	Magnus the Strong

Strength
~3,000	~3,000

Casualties and losses
~2,000	Minor losses

The Battle of Værebro took place in the year 1133 at the Værebro river, on the isle of Zealand.

A Zealandic and Scanian army led by Eric II of Denmark fought a jutlandic army under Magnus the Strong. Magnus defeated the army of Eric and reconquered Roskilde and with it Zealand.

== Background ==
After the murder of Canute Lavard in Haraldsted forest, Magnus the Strong was presumed the murderer and likely fled to Germany. After which Eric assembled an army and marched to Jelling, where his forces were routed by King Niels, he tried to regain control of Jutland during the siege of Schleswig, but was forced to withdraw as the royal army neared. When he finally won a victory at Sejerø, it was tempered by the defeat of Kristiern. He was therefore forced to withdraw to Zealand where he reconquered Roskilde from his traitorous brother, Harald Kesja whom joined Niels and Magnus, and began building another army for his fourth invasion of Jutland.

== Battle ==
The Jutlandic Navy under Magnus sailed through the Fjord of Roskilde, and disembarked their army as a blockade of ships from older times prevented them from sailing any further. Magnus army met Eric at the Værebro river, here an intense melee ensued between the two armies, but the army of Magnus won out and defeated his army so completely that Eric was forced to flee from Zealand.

== Aftermath ==
Eric would not go on the offensive for the rest of the war, and would instead become a beggar king who had only a depleted Skaane and traveled from court to court around the baltic seeking money, men and support. The Danish strait isles would be under the complete control of King Niels, who after being advised by Harald Kesja, cut of the noses of German citizens in Roskilde. This would ultimately lead to the German emperor supporting Eric.

== Sources ==
Saxo Grammaticus, Gesta Danorum
