= Magnus Nielsen =

Magnus Nielsen may refer to:

- Magnus the Strong (c. 1106 – 4 June 1134), Danish duke and a ruler of Götaland
- Magnus Cort Nielsen (born 1993), Danish professional road racing cyclist
