= Olaf II =

Olaf II, Oluf II or Olof II may refer to:

- Olaf II of Norway, king, 995 – 29 July 1030
- Amlaíb Cuarán, king of Dublin, c. 900–981
- Olof Björnsson, king of Sweden, reigned c. 970 – 975
- Olaf the Black, king of Man, mid-13th
- Olaf Haraldsen, anti-king of Denmark, died c. 1143
- Olaf II of Denmark, king, 1370 – 23 August 1387
