= Margaret Fredkulla =

Queen of Denmark (1101–1103) and Norway (1104–1130)

- Queen consort of Denmark and Norway
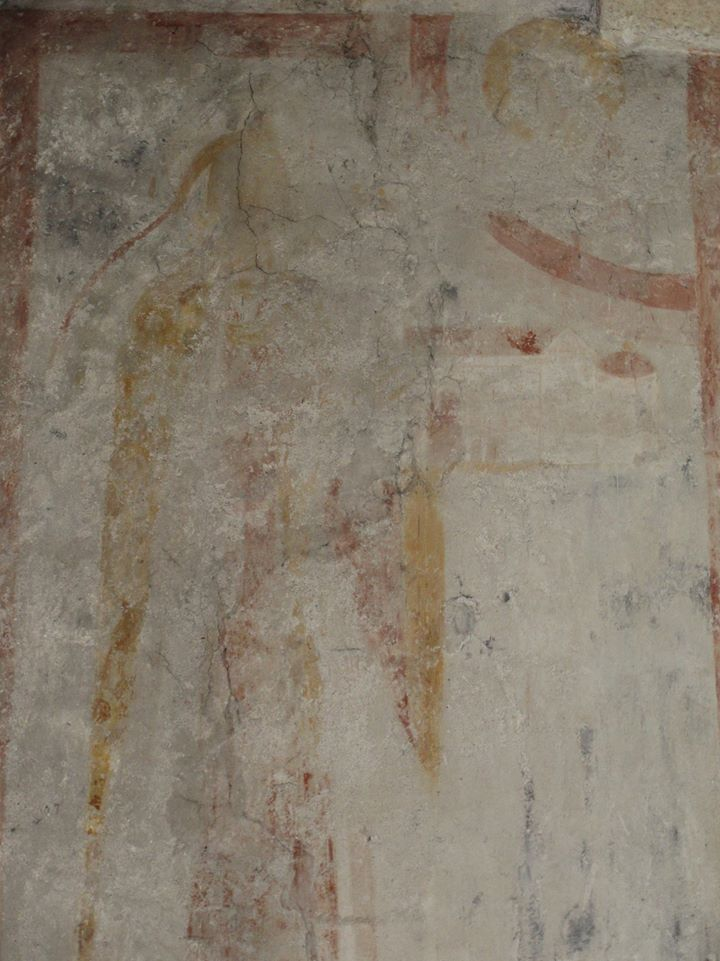
- Contemporary wall painting of Margaret Fredkulla in Vä Church in Scania
- Born: 1080s
- Died: 4 November 1130
- Spouse: Magnus III of Norway; Niels of Denmark
- Issue: Inge Nielsen; Magnus the Strong
- House: Stenkil
- Father: Inge the Elder
- Mother: Helena

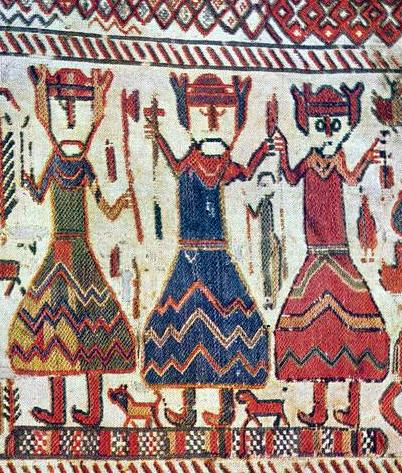
Three kings on the contemporary Skog tapestry have been thought by historians Lagerqvist and Åberg possibly to allude to the Scandinavian summit meeting where Margaret was betrothed to the Norwegian king.

Margaret Fredkulla (Swedish: Margareta Fredkulla; Danish: Margrete Fredkulla; Norwegian: Margrete Fredkolla; 1080s – 4 November 1130) was a Swedish princess who became successively queen of Norway and Denmark by marriage to kings Magnus III of Norway and Niels of Denmark. She was also de facto regent of Denmark.

== Biography ==
Margaret was born a princess as one of four children of King Inge the Elder of Sweden and Queen Helena. The exact year of birth and place of birth is not recorded.

=== Queen of Norway ===
In 1101, she was married to King Magnus of Norway. The marriage had been arranged as a part of the peace treaty between Sweden and Norway. She was often referred to as Margaret Fredkulla ('Maiden of Peace'). She brought with her large fiefs and areas in Sweden as her dowry, probably in Västergötland. In 1103, she was made widow after two years of marriage, and soon left Norway. The marriage was childless. Her departure from Norway was seen as an insult by the Norwegians who expected her to stay, and she was accused of having stolen the holy relics of Saint Olav.

=== Queen of Denmark ===
In 1105, she married King Niels of Denmark. Niels was made king in 1104, but he was described as a passive monarch who lacked the capacity to rule and who left the affairs of the state to his queen. With his blessing, Margaret governed Denmark. She is described as a wise ruler, and the relationship between Denmark and her birth country Sweden was very peaceful during her time as queen. It was said that: Styrelsen beroede for størstedelen paa den ædle dronning Margrete, saa at fremmede sagde, at Danmarks styrelse laa i kvindehaand ("The rule was so much dependent on the noble Queen Margaret, that foreigners remarked that the rule of Denmark lay in a woman's hand"). She minted her own coins, something unique for a queen consort of this time. The Danish coins printed during this period bears the inscription: Margareta-Nicalas ("Margaret-Niels").

Her father, king Inge the Elder, died in 1110, and was succeeded on the Swedish throne by his nephews. Her elder sister, Christina, lived in Russia, and was in Sweden counted as too far away to be given a share in the inheritance of their father, leaving only Margaret and her younger sister Katarina among the sisters as heirs. It is known that Margaret shared her inheritance with her niece Ingrid in Norway, and her niece Ingeborg in Denmark, giving each one-fourth.

In 1114, Margaret was sent a letter by Theobald of Étampes (Theobaldus Stampensis) thanking her for a liberality to the Church of Caen.

=== Death ===
Margaret died in Denmark on 4 November 1130, reportedly from dropsy, as described by Saxo Grammaticus, who noted that "her legs swelled so violently that no medicine could master the disease." Soon after her death, King Niels married the Swedish queen dowager Ulvhild.

Her death marked the end of a long period of relative peace in Denmark. Through Margaret's inheritance, her son Magnus established himself as ruler of Västergötland. In 1131, Magnus murdered his cousin Knud Lavard, which triggered a civil war in Denmark. Three years later both Magnus and King Niels were killed at the Battle of Fotevik.

== Issue ==
Queen Margaret had two children with King Niels:

- Inge Nielsen (died as a child)
- Magnus the Strong (born about 1106)

== Other sources ==
- Harrison, Dick Gud vill det – Nordiska korsfarare under medeltiden (2005)
- Nanna Damsholt Kvindebilledet i dansk højmiddelalder (1985)

Margaret Fredkulla Born: 1080s Died: 1130
Preceded by Ingerid of Denmark	Queen consort of Norway; 1101–1103	Succeeded by Ingebjørg Guttormsdatter
Preceded by Boedil Thurgotsdatter	Queen consort of Denmark; 1104–1130	Succeeded by Ulvhild
