= Labio Castle =

Castle in Spain

The Labio Castle (Castillo de Labio), near Lugo, Spain, is famous in the context of the beginning of the 11th-century Viking nobleman Ulv Galiciefarer fighting against Galician-Leonese king Bermude III.

In 1028 or 1032, when the political crisis occurred in the context of the struggle between Ferdinand I of Castile and the Galician-Leonese king Bermude III, the Galician troops in rebellion against the Kingdom of León, the Vikings again penetrated the Arousa estuary.

Viking nobleman Ulv Galiciefarer (who entered Spain via Ría de Arousa) with Galician Count Rodrigo Romáriz, who was flying the Galician flag against Bermudo III, King of León, together they attacked and conquered the Labio Castle, near Lugo. (Some wrote, Romáriz invited Ulv for the attack).

The two looted the town of O Grove and the Labio Castle. It has been told, that "Ulv and his entourage were sowing terror wherever they passed and increasing their booty." Some termed him the "Viking Wolf."

Some speculate that a reference to "castle of Bermudo" refers to this castle.

In 2018, a group set out in search of this historic castle.
