= Siwardus (bishop of Uppsala) =

Siwardus was a Bishop of Uppsala in the 1140s. He was probably the same person as the Sverinius who is mentioned as the first Bishop of Uppsala in an early 15th-century Incerti scriptorts Sueci chronicon primorumin ecclesia Upsalensi archiepiscoporum, chronicle of Uppsala archbishops. Historical sources mention Siwardus in 1142 and 1143.

Siwardus apparently died in a monastery in Oldenburg in 1159 after being exiled from Uppsala by local heathens sometime earlier. There were plans to have him canonized as a saint, which never took place.
