= Harald Kesja =

- Anti-King of Denmark
- Born: 1080
- Died: 1135 (aged 54–55); Jutland
- Spouse: Ragnild Magnusdotter of Norway
- Issue: Bjørn Haraldsen Ironside; Eric Haraldsen; Magnus Haraldsen; Olaf Haraldsen; Canute Haraldsen; Harald Haraldsen
- House: Estridsen
- Father: Eric I of Denmark

Harald Kesja (lit. Harald the Spear) (1080–1135) was the son of Eric I of Denmark and anti-king of Denmark.

He acted as regent 1103–1104 for his father while he was on pilgrimage to Jerusalem alongside Archbishop Asser of Lund. As regent, he was courageous, but violent, cruel and debauched. Harald plundered far and wide from his stronghold Haraldsborg at Roskilde, which greatly contributed to him not being elected king after his father died in 1103. Instead, his uncle Niels of Denmark was elected king in 1104.

In 1132, he allied with his half-brother Eric Emune in order to avenge his third brother Canute Lavard, but he later turned to the murderer Magnus Nielsen because he had desires for the Danish throne himself. He tried to gain recognition as king and was successful in receiving the homage of Jutland, but he was defeated along with Magnus at the Battle of Fotevik in Skåne, 1134. He fled after the defeat but he was taken captive near Vejle on Jutland and decapitated together with eight of his sons.

Harald Kesja
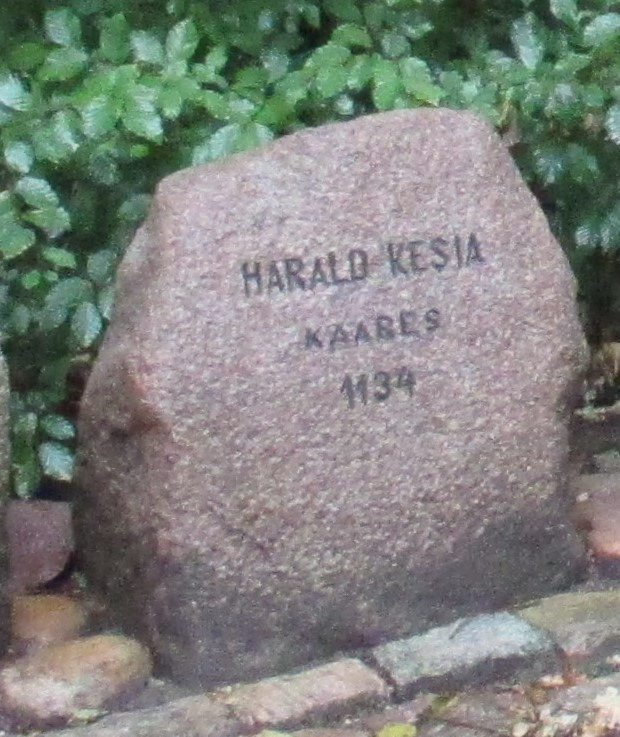
- Memorial stone to Harald Kesja
- Born: 1080
- Died: 1135 (aged 54–55)
- Cause of death: Decapitation
- Children: Olaf Haraldsen; Bjørn Haraldsen Ironside
- Parent: Eric I of Denmark
- Relatives: Eric II of Denmark (brother); Canute Lavard (brother)

== Issue ==
Harald Kesja had married to Ragnild Magnusdotter, the daughter of King Magnus III of Norway. They had four or six sons:

- Björn Haraldsen Ironside (d. 1134), married Katarina Ingesdotter, the daughter of Inge I of Sweden. and the father of Christina of Denmark, a Swedish queen. He accidentally drowned with his brother Eric in 1134 near Schleswig, could have been illegitimate son.
- Eric Haraldsen (d. 1134), was a deacon. He accidentally drowned with his brother Björn in 1134 near Schleswig, could have been illegitimate son.
- Magnus Haraldsen (d. 4 June 1134), killed at the Battle of Fotevik.
- Olaf Haraldsen (d. 1143), ruled Skåne in opposition to King Eric III of Denmark; he was defeated and killed in 1143.
- Canute Haraldsen, killed in 1135.
- Harald Haraldsen, killed in 1135.

Harald Kesja had also further nine illegitimate sons of whom we know the names of six of them:

- Sivard Haraldsen, killed in 1135.
- Eric Haraldsen, killed in 1135.
- Sweyn Haraldsen, killed in 1135.
- Niels Haraldsen, killed in 1135.
- Benedict Haraldsen, killed in 1135.
- Mistivint Haraldsen, killed in 1135.
