= Olaf Haraldsen =

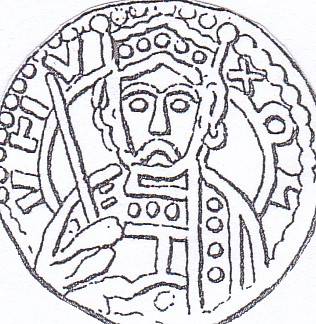
- Olaf's portrait on one of the coins minted in Lund on his behalf.
- Died: 1143
- Parents: Harald Kesja (father); Ragnild Magnusdotter (mother)

Olaf Haraldsen (died c. 1143) was a Danish anti-king who ruled Scania for a few years from 1139. He never won control over the rest of Denmark, and he is not included in the list of Danish monarchs used by the Danish monarchy or Den Store Danske Encyklopædi. He is sometimes called "Olaf II" even though there was a later Olaf II of Denmark.

== Early life ==
He was the son of Harald Kesja and thus nephew of King Eric II of Denmark. He seems to have been the only one who escaped Eric II's murder of Harald and his sons in 1135.

== Anti-king ==
After trying in vain to regain his heritage, Olaf proclaimed himself king in Scania in 1139, fighting his cousin King Eric III of Denmark. The civil war mostly consisted of alternating raids, during which Olaf killed Bishop Rike of Roskilde, an act that saw him excommunicated by the Pope. He was at last defeated by Eric III and was killed in a battle in Middle Scania around 1143.

== Personal life ==
Harald Skrænk, the leader of a peasant rebellion in Scania about 1182, is said to have been Olaf's illegitimate son, but their connection is unsure.

== Ancestry ==
Ancestors of Olaf Haraldsen

16. Ulf Thorgilsson
8. Sweyn II of Denmark
17. Estrid Svendsdatter
4. Eric I of Denmark
9. mistress (Old Norse: frilla) (name unknown)
2. Harald Kesja
1. Olaf Haraldsen
24. Harald III of Norway
12. Olaf III of Norway
25. Tora Torbergsdatter
6. Magnus III of Norway
26. Johan or Árni lági
13. Thora
3. Ragnhild Magnusdotter of Norway
