= Sweyn III of Denmark =

King of Denmark from 1146 to 1157

Sweyn III Grathe
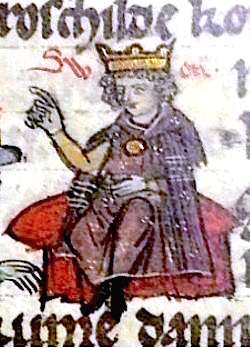
- Illustration of Sweyn III in the 13th-century Saxon World Chronicle

King of Denmark
- Reign: 1146–1157
- Predecessor: Eric III Lamb
- Successor: Valdemar I the Great
- Co-kings: Canute V (from 1146), Valdemar I the Great (from 1154)
- Born: c. 1125
- Died: 23 October 1157 (aged 31–32); Grathe Heath, Denmark
- Burial: Gradehede, then Viborg Cathedral
- Consort: Adela of Meissen
- Issue: Unnamed son; Luitgard, Margravine of Istria
Names
- Sweyn Eriksen
- House: Estridsen
- Father: Eric II the Memorable
- Mother: Thunna

Sweyn III Grathe (Note: For the significance of the epithet, see § Tripartition) (Danish: Svend III Grathe; c. 1125 – 23 October 1157) was the king of Denmark between 1146 and 1157, in shifting alliances with Canute V and his own cousin Valdemar I. In 1157, the three agreed to a tripartition of Denmark. Sweyn attempted to kill his rivals at the peace banquet, and was subsequently defeated by Valdemar I at the Battle of Grathe Heath and killed.

== Early life ==
Sweyn was the illegitimate son of King Erik II the Memorable and the concubine Thunna. Sweyn travelled with Eric II to Norway in the mid-1130s, when his father fought King Niels to win the Danish throne. When Eric II died in 1137, he was succeeded by Eric III, and Sweyn was sent to the court of Conrad III of Germany. Here he befriended Conrad's nephew Frederick.

Sweyn travelled to Denmark, where he and his cousin Valdemar sought to canonize Sweyn's uncle and Valdemar's father Canute Lavard in 1146, under protest from Archbishop Eskil of Lund in Scania. At the abdication of Eric III in 1146, Sweyn was elected king by the magnates on Zealand while Canute V was crowned by their counterparts in Jutland.

== Civil war ==
For the next years, Sweyn fought a civil war against Canute for the kingship of Denmark, supported by Valdemar. Canute was supported by Archbishop Eskil, but Sweyn moved to secure Eskil's loyalty by granting the Archbishop of Lund land holdings in Scania and Bornholm. Sweyn subsequently defeated Canute on Zealand, to confine him to Jutland. In 1147, Sweyn and Canute united to support the Wendish Crusade. As Sweyn engaged the Wends in naval battle, he received little support from Canute, and lost his flagship. The civil war was soon re-ignited.

After several battles, Sweyn conquered Funen and parts of Jutland, and set Valdemar up as Duke of Schleswig. Sweyn then campaigned with Etheler von Dithmarschen against Adolf II of Holstein, a supporter of Canute. Sweyn succeeded in banishing Canute in 1150, and Canute's re-entry with German troops in 1151 was also repulsed. Both Canute and Sweyn sought the support of Conrad III of Germany. In 1152, Frederick I was crowned King of Germany, and he brokered a deal in Merseburg later that year. The deal made Sweyn "premier king", with Canute eligible to receive a substantial portion of Denmark, and Valdemar keeping the Duchy of Schleswig. However, Sweyn only granted Canute small holdings, breaking the agreement, and Sweyn's position in Denmark was further undermined by his alleged tyrannical conduct and his pro-German attitude.

== Tripartition ==
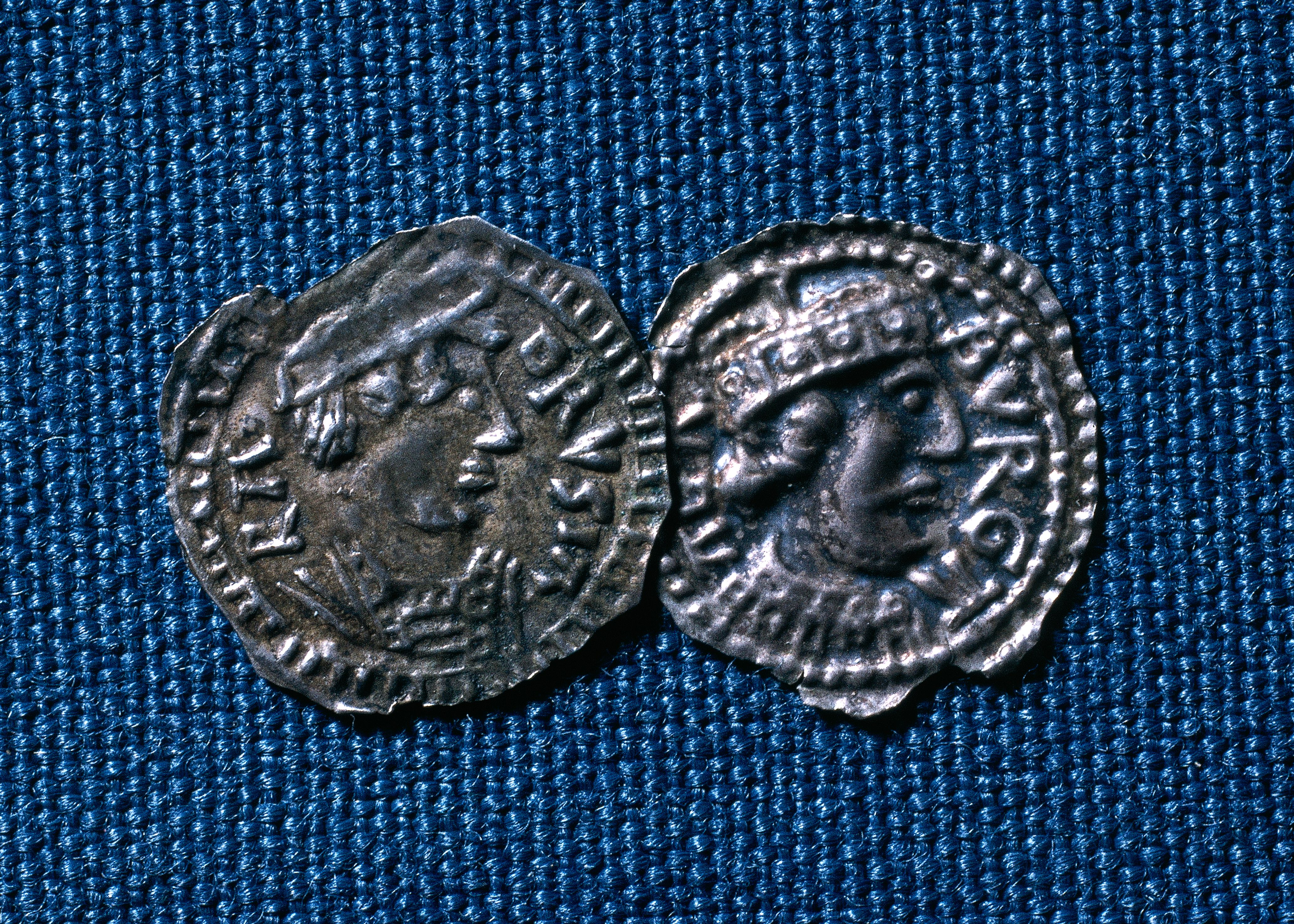
A Danish penning coin minted in Randers or Aarhus during the reigh of Svend Grathe.

In 1154, Sweyn was overthrown by an alliance between Canute and Valdemar, who was crowned Canute's co-ruler as Valdemar I. Eskil and the majority of Sweyn's other supporters deserted him, and he went into exile in Germany. Sweyn spent three years seeking support for a reconquest, and returned to Denmark in 1157 with the support of German duke Henry the Lion. This prompted the Danish magnates to force through a tripartition of the kingdom into Jutland, Zealand, and Scania. Sweyn chose first, and was made the ruler of Scania. At the peace banquet in Roskilde on 9 August 1157, Sweyn planned on killing his two co-rulers, and succeeded in having Canute killed. The incident became known as the Bloodfeast of Roskilde.

Valdemar escaped to Jutland, and on 23 October 1157, Sweyn and his army faced and met him at the Battle of Grathe Heath, which gave him his nickname Grathe. Sweyn's army was defeated, and he was killed by peasants who caught him when his horse was sucked into a bog while he fled from the battle.

== Marriage and issue ==
In 1152, Sweyn married Adela of Meissen, daughter of Conrad, Margrave of Meissen, and Luitgard of Ravenstein. They had a short-lived son, possibly named Eric, and a daughter, Luitgard, who married Berthold I of Istria.

== Notes ==
Sweyn Grathe House of Estridsen Born: c. 1125 Died: 23 October 1157
Regnal titles
Preceded by Eric Lamb	King of Denmark; 1146–1157 with Canute V & Valdemar the Great	Succeeded by Valdemar the Great
