= Battle of Grathe Heath =

1157 final battle of the Danish Civil War

- Part of Danish Civil War
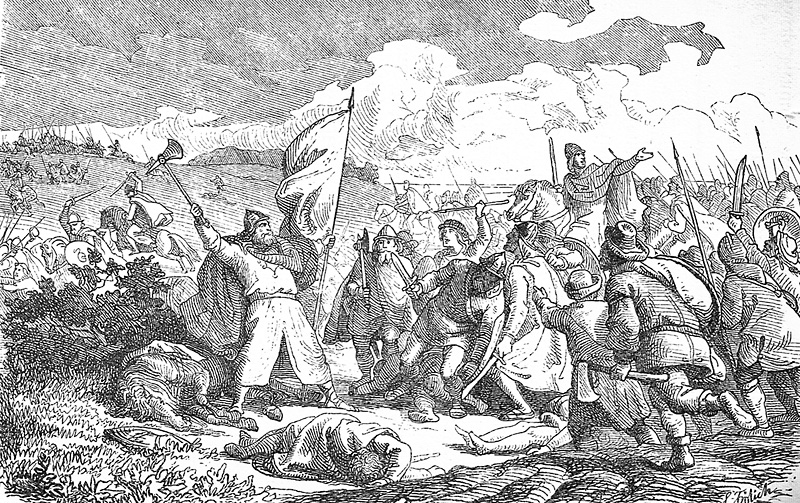
- The Battle of Grathe Heath by Lorenz Frølich
Date	23 October 1157
Location	Jutland Peninsula, Denmark 56°15′31″N 9°20′16″E
Result	Valdemar I victory End of the Danish Civil War

Belligerents
Forces of Valdemar I	Forces of Sweyn III

Commanders and leaders
Valdemar I	Sweyn III †

Strength
~2,000	~4,000–5,000 (entire force of Zealand and east Denmark mustered)

Casualties and losses
Minor	~4,000 entire force slain, captured or scattered

The Battle of Grathe Heath was the last major battle of the Danish Civil Wars, being fought on 23 October 1157 at the Jutland Peninsula between the armies of Valdemar I and his rival for the Danish throne, Sweyn III. Valdemar's forces won the battle, and Sweyn was slain while attempting to flee.

== Background ==
The battle was fought on 23 October 1157 and marked the end of a civil war between Sweyn III, Canute V, and Valdemar I the Great, all contenders for the Danish throne. After Eric III of Denmark had abdicated in 1146, Sweyn III, son of Eric Emune, was declared king of Zealand and Scania, while Canute, son of King Magnus, became king of Jutland. Canute made several attempts to conquer Zealand (1147 and 1150), but was driven off and fled to Germany, where he managed to raise an army.

In 1152, a battle was fought at Gedebæk, close to Viborg. Canute lost and appealed to the German king (later emperor), Frederick Barbarossa, who commanded both kings to meet him at Merseburg. Here, Frederic confirmed Sweyn's rights of kingship, and Sweyn swore fealty to him.

The nobles of Denmark were becoming worried about the growing German influence. Valdemar, having at first joined Sweyn, who had made him Duke of Schleswig, changed sides and was betrothed to Canute's half-sister Sophie.

Both Canute and Sweyn were hailed as kings at the Landsting in Viborg in 1154.

== Treachery ==
The three contenders agreed to share power, so that Valdemar would rule Jutland, Canute the islands of Zealand and Funen, and Sweyn Scania. Then a reconciling feast was agreed upon, and it was held in Roskilde on 9 August 1157. But, according to Saxo Grammaticus, Sweyn ordered his men to kill the two other kings. Canute was slain, but Valdemar, though wounded, managed to turn over some great candlesticks and escape in the ensuing fire and confusion. He fled into the darkness and managed to return to Jutland.

== Battle ==
People flocked to Valdemar's banner when Sweyn's treachery was revealed, and he gathered a great host. Sweyn landed at Grenå (at the mouth of the Djurså stream), but his fleet was destroyed by a combination of force and guile. Sweyn marched upon Randers and Valdemar retreated to the other side of the Gudenå River and tore down the bridge.

At the end of September Valdemar felt that he was powerful enough to face Sweyn's army, and on 23 October the two armies met at Grathe Heath. The battle was short, but vicious. Sweyn failed to locate Valdemar's main force, and was suddenly attacked with such force that he fled his army. He blundered into the swampy areas at one end of the Hauge Lake, and lost his weapons and armour. Shortly afterwards, he was captured and killed with an axe, according to tradition, by angry peasants.

After his death, Sweyn was nicknamed Grathe, after the place where he lost both his crown and his life.

== Aftermath ==
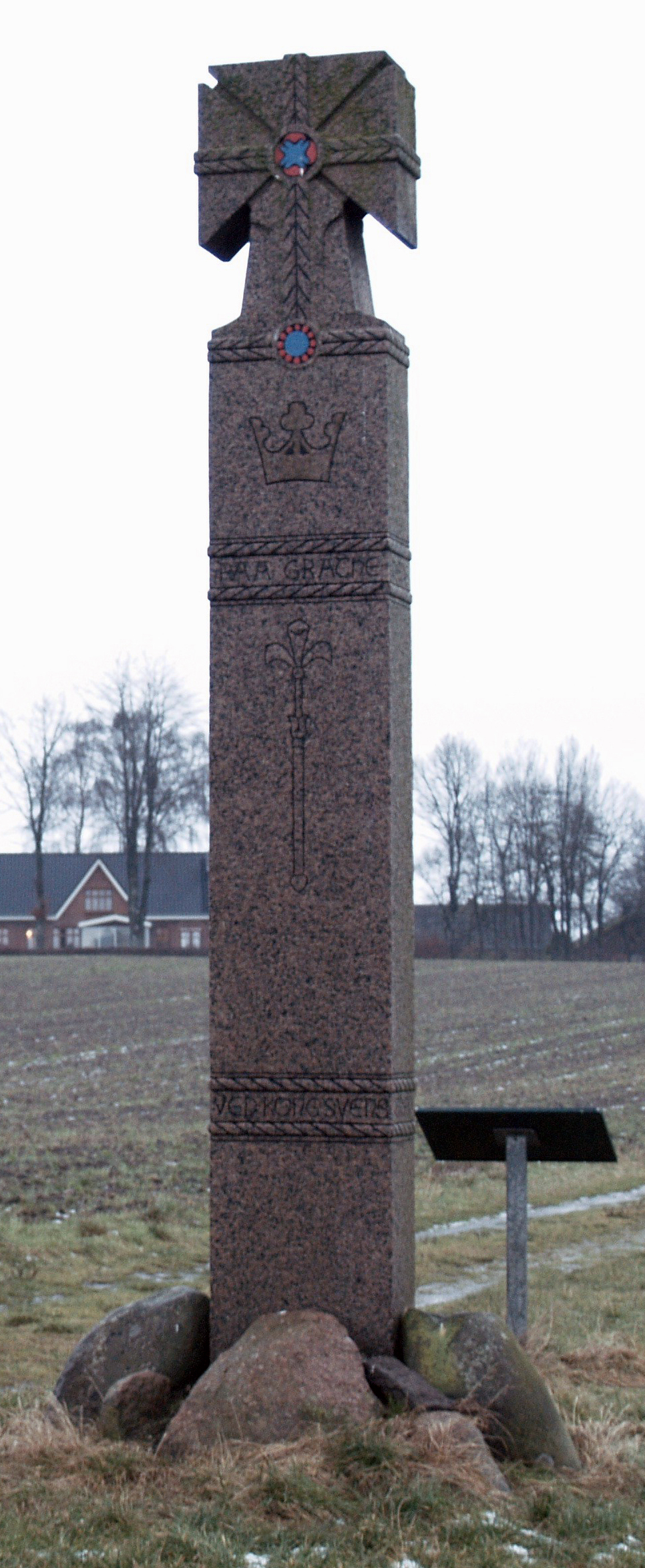
The Sven Grathe-cros, a monument by Thor Lange.

Valdemar, having outlived all his rival pretenders, became the sole king of Denmark, and purged all of Sweyn's allies. He reorganized and rebuilt war-torn Denmark. In 1892, Thor Lange put up a memorial stone cross at the site of the battle.
