= Olaf I of Denmark =

King of Denmark from 1086 to 1095

Olaf I Hunger
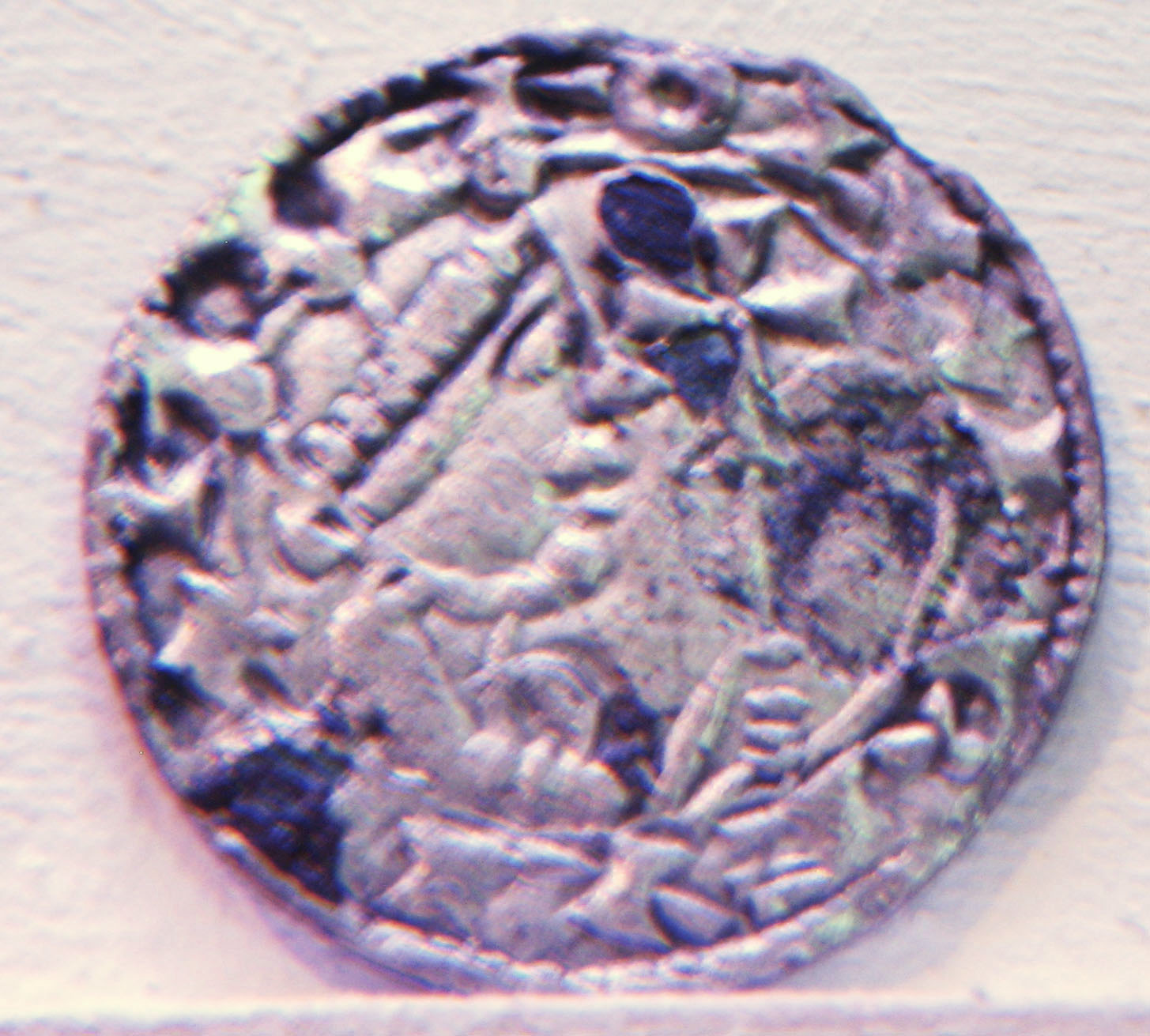
- Coin depicting King Olaf I

King of Denmark
- Reign: 1086–1095
- Predecessor: Canute IV
- Successor: Eric I
- Born: c. 1050
- Died: 18 August 1095 (aged 44–45)
- Spouse: Ingegerd of Norway
- House: Estridsen
- Father: Sweyn II of Denmark

Olaf I (Danish: Oluf; c. 1050 – 18 August 1095), nicknamed Olaf Hunger, was king of Denmark from 1086 to 1095, following the death of his brother Canute IV the Holy. He was a son of king Sweyn II Estridsson, and the third of Sweyn's sons to rule. He married Ingegard, the daughter of Harald Hardråde, but did not have any sons. He was succeeded by his brother Eric the Good.

== Biography ==
Olaf was born around 1050, to king Sweyn II Estridsson and an unknown concubine. During the reign of his elder brother Canute IV, Olaf supposedly served as Duke of Schleswig. In 1085, Olaf was called to a leding campaign against England. Canute was held up and could not join the leding, and as the navy grew weary in waiting for him, Olaf became the spokesperson for its concerns. Canute feared Olaf's support among the magnates, while Olaf had misgivings about Canute's dynastic ambition, and saw Canute's son Charles the Good as a potential rival for power. Canute blamed Olaf for stirring up trouble, and Olaf was put in chains by their brother Eric, the later king Eric I Evergood. Olaf was banished to Flanders, under the supervision of Robert I of Flanders.

=== King of Denmark ===
Canute was killed in St. Alban's Priory in Odense in July 1086, following a rebellion in Northern Jutland. Olaf was proclaimed king at the Viborg landsting assembly, though he was still in Flanders. An arrangement was made to swap Olaf for his younger brother Niels, the later king Niels of Denmark, to permit Olaf to return to Denmark. Upon the return of Oluf, Eric fled to Scania. Olaf was the third of Sweyn's sons to become king of Denmark.

Olaf's reign was plagued by several consecutive years of crop failure and famine. According to Arild Hvitfeldt's "Danmarks Riges Krønike", in those years springtime was so dry that the fields looked as if they had been burned, and in the fall the skies opened up and rain fell so often that people floated about on pieces of wood to cut the heads off the grain that rose above the water. The hunger of the people grew so great that they dug the earth looking for roots. The wealthy grew thin, and the poor died of starvation. Sickness and starvation soon visited great and small. In the first early attempts of getting Canute canonized, Olaf was given the nickname "Hunger" in order to magnify the splendor of Canute. At the time it was claimed that the famine was sent by God as divine punishment for the sacrilegious killing of Canute. Chronicler Saxo Grammaticus described the hunger as a strictly Danish phenomenon, though it has later been described as a general problem of Europe in those years.

Oluf probably cut the Danish ties to the Papal Gregorian reform movement, supporting Antipope Wibert of Ravenna instead. During Olaf's reign, some of Canute's laws were repealed, and the power of the clergy and royalty receded in favour of the magnates. When Skjalm Hvide sought the support of Olaf in avenging the death of his brother by campaigning against the Wends, Olaf could not muster the power to help him. The magnates became more involved in the works of the Church, and Jutlandish magnate Asser Svendsen was appointed Archbishop of Lund by Olaf in 1089.

=== Death ===
Olaf died on 18 August 1095 under mysterious circumstances. Some speculate that he may have killed himself or that he was sacrificed on behalf of his luckless people. Saxo Grammaticus writes that he "willingly gave himself to lose the land of its bad luck and begged that all of it (guilt) would fall upon his head alone. So offered he his life for his countrymen." It has been postulated that his body was divided among the regions of Denmark as a kind of scapegoat which was to take away the blood guilt of Denmark and restore it to its previous fortunes. He was succeeded by his brother Eric I Evergood.

Olaf I House of Estridsen Born: c. 1050 Died: 18 August 1095
Regnal titles
Preceded by Canute the Saint	King of Denmark; 1086–1095	Succeeded by Eric Evergood
New title	Earl of (Southern) Jutland; 1080–1095	Vacant Title next held by Canute Lavard
