= Battle of Fotevik =

1134 battle in Europe

Coordinates: 55.45°N 12.9667°E

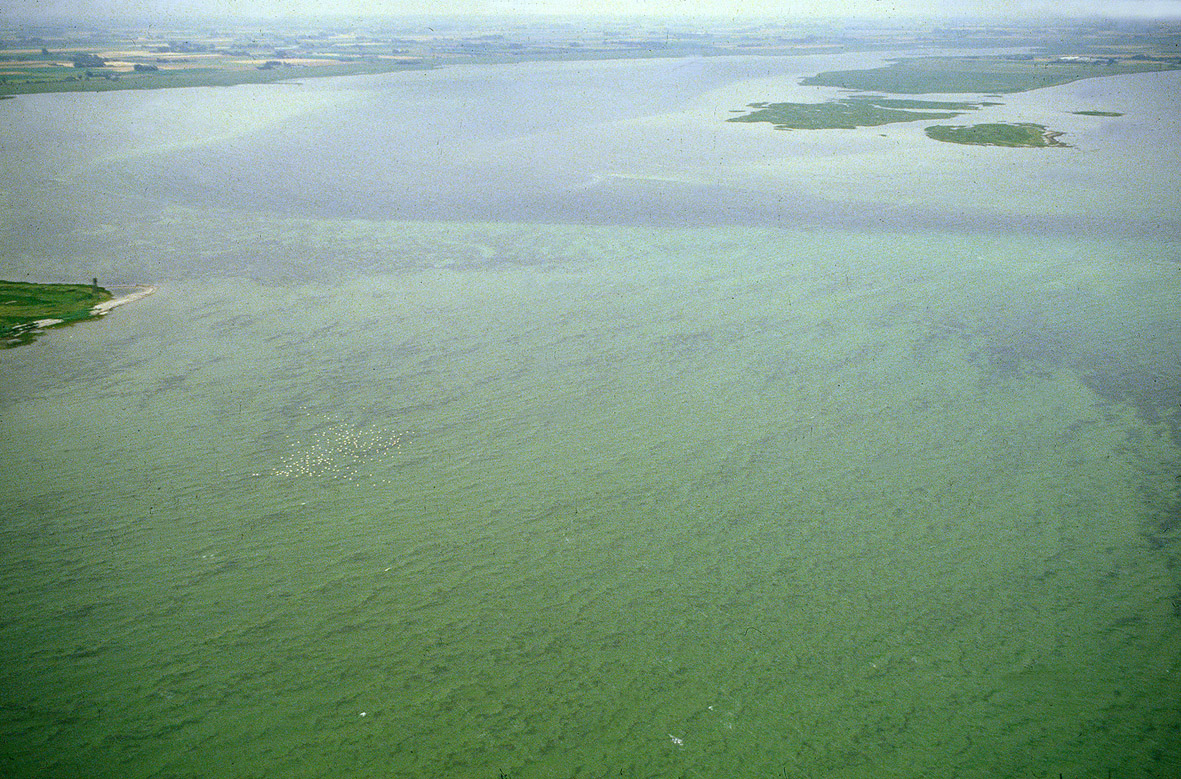
Foteviken

Battle of Fotevik (Danish: Slaget ved Fodevig) was fought between forces of King Niels of Denmark and his son Magnus Nielsen, against those of Erik Emune on 4 June 1134 at the bay of Fotevik in Skåne.

At his death, King Eric I of Denmark had two known sons who were candidates for succession to the throne, Canute Lavard and Erik Emune. Canute, as Eric's only legitimate son, had a particularly strong claim. When King Eric's younger brother Niels was selected instead, becoming King Niels, Canute was forced to flee. In January 1131 he was trapped in a forest near Ringsted in Zealand, and killed. Some sources consider it to have been a murder committed by Magnus Nielsen, while some attribute it to King Niels himself. The new king and his son soon found themselves in a civil war against Lavard's half-brother Eric Emune. The death of Canute Lavard had provoked a civil war that would last intermittently until 1157.

At the Battle of Fotevik, the forces of King Niels were taken by surprise by a contingent of German soldiers on horses. Cavalry attack on a large scale had previously only rarely been used in Scandinavia. Magnus Nielsen was slain, together with the six (possibly five) bishops and a large number of the priests accompanying the invading army.

After the battle, King Niels fled with the remnants of his fleet to Schleswig. During his flight Niels reckoned his nephew Harald Kesja as his co-king in Denmark. Niels was murdered in Schleswig on 25 June 1134 by the city's burghers.

The battle was a decisive victory for Eric, who became the next King of Denmark as Eric II.
