= Canute V of Denmark =

King of Denmark from 1146 to 1157

Canute V
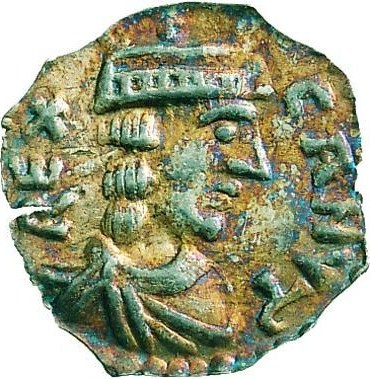
- Bracteate from the reign of Canute V.

King of Denmark
- Reign: 1146–1157
- Predecessor: Eric III Lamb
- Successor: Valdemar I the Great
- Co-kings: Sweyn III (from 1146), Valdemar I (from 1154)
- Born: c. 1129
- Died: 9 August 1157 (aged 27–28); Roskilde, Denmark
- Consort: Helena of Sweden
- Illegitimate children Detail: Saint Niels; Valdemar, Bishop of Schleswig; Hildegard, Princess of Rügen
Names
- Canute Magnussen
- House: Estridsen
- Father: Magnus the Strong
- Mother: Richeza of Poland

Canute V Magnussen (Danish: Knud V Magnussen) (c. 1129 – 9 August 1157) was a King of Denmark from 1146 to 1157, as co-regent in shifting alliances with Sweyn III and Valdemar I. Canute was killed at the so-called Bloodfeast of Roskilde in 1157.

== Biography ==
Canute was born around 1129, the son of Magnus the Strong and his consort Richeza of Poland. After the abdication of Eric III in 1146, the magnates of Jutland declared Canute king, while the magnates of Zealand and Scania crowned Sweyn III, the nephew of Canute Lavard who Magnus had killed in 1131.

In the following years, Canute tried in vain to defeat Sweyn III on Zealand for complete control over Denmark. In 1147, Canute and Sweyn united to undertake the Wendish Crusade, which however ended in the re-ignition of their strife. Sweyn and his cousin Duke Valdemar, the son of Canute Lavard, defeated Canute in Jutland in 1150, and Canute fled to his father-in-law Sverker I of Sweden. Canute attempted a number of reconquests, all of them unsuccessful, and turned to Frederick Barbarossa for help. The resulting compromise of 1152, which was supported by Valdemar, made Canute the inferior co-regent of Sweyn. However, Sweyn decided not to effectuate the deal.

Canute now formed an alliance with Valdemar and Sverker, whose daughter Helena Canute was to marry. Sweyn fled Denmark in 1154, and Canute struck a deal with Valdemar, making him his co-ruler. Canute was an inferior king to Valdemar, and after Sweyn's re-entry into Denmark, a final compromise was struck in 1157, under pressure from the Danish magnates. Sweyn, Canute, and Valdemar were set up as co-rulers, with Canute ruling Zealand. During the peace banquet in Roskilde on 9 August 1157, later known as the Bloodfeast of Roskilde, Sweyn attempted to kill both Canute and Valdemar. Canute was allegedly killed by one of Sweyn's warriors.

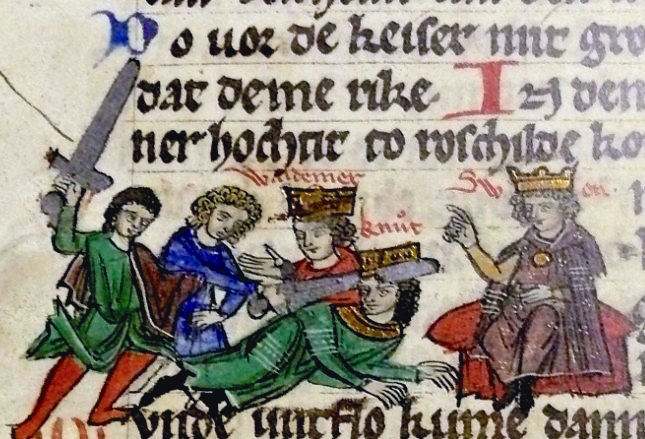
Murder of Canute in the 13th-century Sächsische Weltchronik

Canute's half-sister Sofia of Minsk married Valdemar, who avenged him the same year by killing Sweyn at the Battle of Grathe Heath to win Denmark for himself.

== Issue ==
Not more than a year before his death, Canute married Helen of Sweden, but they had no children. Canute fathered two or three children out of wedlock:

1. Saint Niels of Aarhus (died 1180); he lived as monk
2. Valdemar; he was Bishop of Schleswig and Prince-Archbishop of Bremen
3. Hildegard; she married Jaromar I, Prince of Rugia (possible daughter but uncertain)

Canute V House of Estridsen Born: ca. 1129 Died: 9 August 1157
Regnal titles
Preceded by Eric Lamb	King of Denmark; 1146–1157 with Sweyn Grathe & Valdemar the Great	Succeeded by Valdemar the Great
