= Eric I of Denmark =

King of Denmark from 1095 to 1103

Eric I
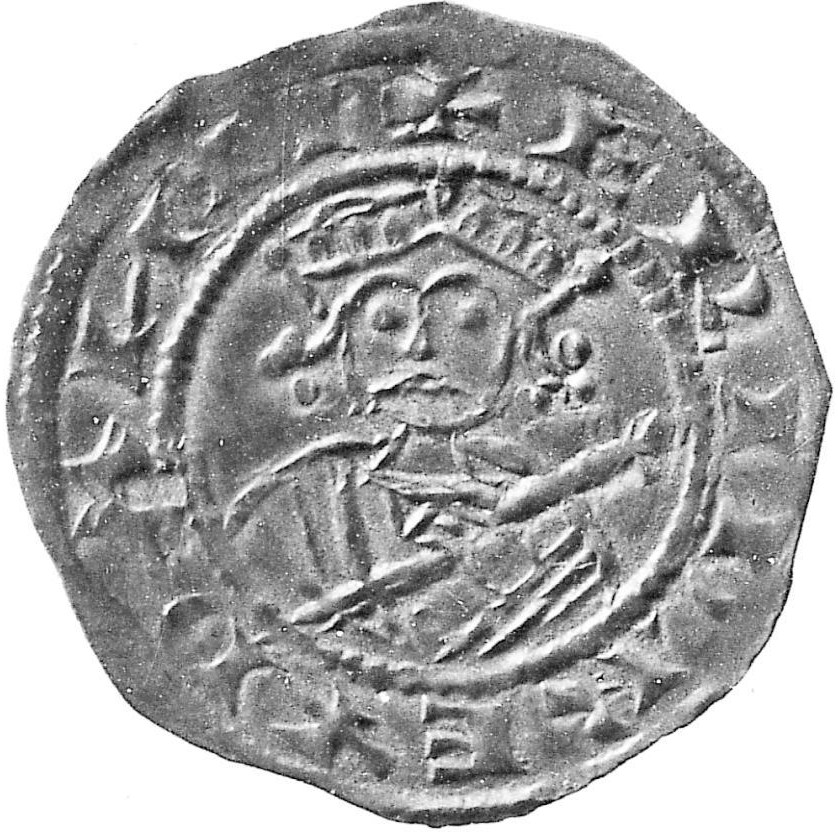
- Coin of Eric Evergood

King of Denmark
- Reign: 1095–1103
- Predecessor: Olaf I
- Successor: Niels
- Born: c. 1056; Slangerup, Denmark
- Died: 10 July 1103 (aged 46–47); Paphos, Cyprus
- Burial: Chrysopolitissa Basilica, Paphos, Cyprus
- Spouse: Boedil Thurgotsdatter
- Issue: Canute Lavard; Illegitimate: Harald Kesja; Eric II; Ragnhild Jyde Eriksdatter
- House: Estridsen
- Father: Sweyn II of Denmark

Eric I (c. 1056 – 10 July 1103), also known as Eric the Good or Eric Evergood (Danish: Erik Ejegod), was King of Denmark following his brother Olaf I Hunger in 1095. He was a son of Sweyn II. His mother's identity remains unknown. He married Boedil Thurgotsdatter.

== Biography ==
Eric was born in the town of Slangerup in North Zealand - the largest Danish island. During the rule of his half-brother Canute IV he was an eager supporter of the king, but he was spared during the rebellion against Canute. Eric remained at the royal farm instead of accompanying Canute to St Albans priory in Odense, where Canute was killed. Eric talked his way off the farm and fled to Zealand and then to Scania, which was part of Denmark during that time. Olaf I Hunger was elected King of Denmark, but his reign was short. At last Eric was elected as a king at the several landsting assemblies in 1095. Eric was well liked by the people and the famines that had plagued Denmark during Olaf Hunger's reign ceased. For many it seemed a sign from God that Eric was the right king for Denmark.

Medieval chroniclers, such as Saxo Grammaticus, and myths portrayed Eric a "strapping fellow" appealing to the common people. He could keep his place when four men tried their best to move him. Eric was a good speaker, and people went out of their way to hear him. After a ting assembly concluded, he went about the neighborhood greeting men, women and children at their homesteads. He had a reputation as a loud man who liked parties and who led a rather dissolute private life. Though a presumed supporter of a strong centralized royal power, he seems to have behaved like a diplomat, avoiding any clash with the magnates. He had a reputation for being ruthless to robbers and pirates.

On a visit to the Pope in Rome he obtained canonization for his late brother, Canute IV, and an archbishopric for Denmark (now Lund in Scania), instead of being under the Archbishop of Hamburg-Bremen. Bishop Asser then became the first Archbishop of Lund.

King Eric announced at the Viborg assembly that he had decided to go on pilgrimage to the Holy Land. The cause, according to Saxo in Danmarks Riges Krønike, was Eric's killing of four of his own hirdmen in a fit of madness caused by a musician who claimed his playing could drive men to insanity. Despite the pleas of his subjects, he would not be deterred. Eric appointed his son, Harald Kesja, and Bishop Asser as regents.

Eric and Boedil and a large company traveled through Russia to Constantinople where he was a guest of the emperor. While there, he became ill, but took ship for Cyprus anyway. He died at Paphos, Cyprus in July 1103. The queen had him buried there. He was the first king to go on pilgrimage after Jerusalem was conquered during the First Crusade. Queen Boedil also became ill, but made it to Jerusalem where she died. She was buried at the foot of the Mount of Olives in the Valley of Josaphat.

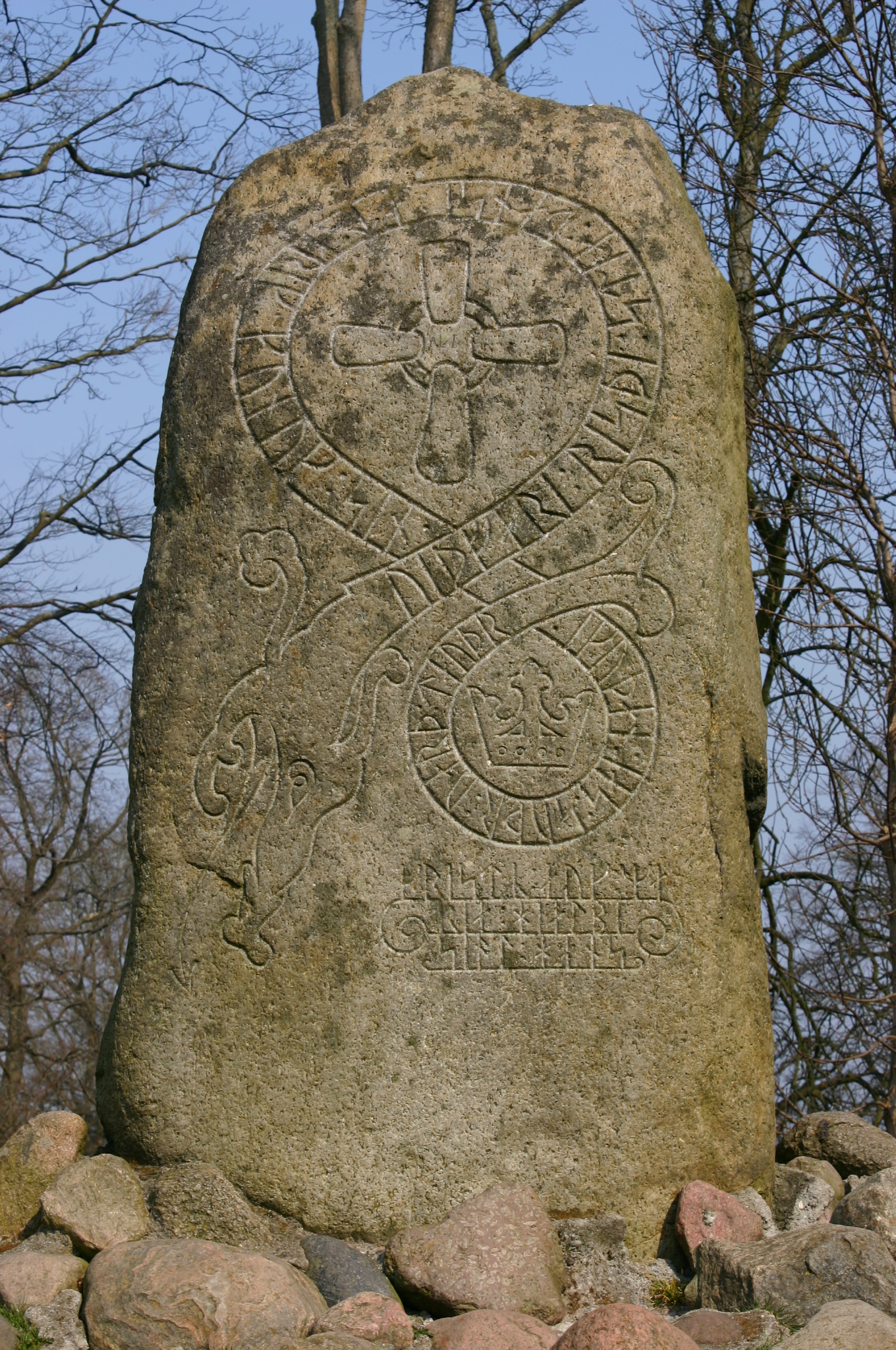
Memorial stone in Borgvold, Viborg, Denmark

== Family ==
Eric and Boedil had one legitimate son, Canute Lavard. Harald Kesja was Canute's half-brother. Eric had two sons outside marriage—Eric II the Memorable and Benedict—and one daughter, Ragnhilde (mother of the future king Eric III Lamb).

Canute Lavard, king Eric's legitimate son, was a chivalrous and popular Danish prince. Canute was murdered 7 January 1131 by Eric's nephew Magnus the Strong, the son of King Niels, who viewed Canute as a likely competitor for the throne. Canute's death occurred days before the birth of his child, Valdemar, who would become King of Denmark from 1157(54) to 1182. Eric Ejegod is the ancestor of later Danish monarchs.

== See also ==
- Sigurd the Crusader a Norwegian king, who went on crusade in 1107

Eric I of Denmark (Eric Evergood) Born: c. 1060 – Slangerup Died: July 10 1103
Regnal titles
Preceded by Olaf I	King of Denmark; 1095–1103	Succeeded by Niels
