= Magnus the Strong =

King of Sweden (disputed)
- Reign: 1120s – c. 1132
- Predecessor: Inge the Younger
- Successor: Sverker the Elder

Co-king of Denmark
- Reign: 15 April 1134 – 4 June 1134
- Coronation: 15 April 1134
- Senior king: Niels
- Born: c. 1106
- Died: 4 June 1134 (aged 27–28); Fotevik, Scania
- Spouse: Richeza of Poland
- Issue: Canute V of Denmark; Niels
Names
- Swedish: Magnus Nilsson
- House: Estridsen
- Father: Niels I of Denmark
- Mother: Margaret Fredkulla

Magnus the Strong (c. 1106 – 4 June 1134), also known as Magnus Nilsson (Danish: Magnus Nielsen/Nielssøn), was a Danish duke who ruled Götaland in southern Sweden from the 1120s to c. 1132. It is disputed whether he was elected king by the Swedes, but he is nevertheless sometimes found in the modern list of Swedish monarchs as Magnus I. Snorri Sturlason gives him the epithet "Strong".

He was also briefly co-king of Denmark from 15 April 1134 until his death.

== Youth and appearance ==
Magnus was the son of King Niels I of Denmark and Margaret Fredkulla, the second or eldest daughter of King Inge the Elder of Sweden. His elder brother Inge was killed in a riding accident, leaving Magnus as the sole heir to Niels. He grew up to be a tall and strong young man, a head taller than anyone else. The chronicles give different opinions about his character, depending on their political preferences. The near-contemporary Roskilde Chronicle calls him merry and generous and a "lover of firmness in character". Saxo Grammaticus, on the other hand, says that he was well endowed by nature but still a violent brute.

== Road to kingship ==
When Margaret's first cousin King Inge the Younger died at an unknown time in the 1120s, Magnus claimed the throne as the eldest grandson of Inge the Elder. According to the chronicler Saxo Grammaticus, Magnus was recognized by the Geats (Götarna) of Götaland, but the prerogatives of selecting a king traditionally lay with the Swedes, another tribe to the north of the Geats.

The brief chronicle incorporated in the Westrogothic law does not mention Magnus, but does say that following the death of Inge, the Swedes had selected Ragnvald Knaphövde. Ragnvald showed disrespect towards the Geats by not giving hostages when riding his tour of installation. In retaliation, Ragnvald was murdered by the Geatish population, an event sometimes dated to c. 1129. After this, the law-speaker of Västergötland, Karl of Edsvära, governed his province around this time and is occasionally known in the sources as jarl or even "king".

Saxo does not mention Ragnvald by name, but mentions that the Swedes elected a king in response to the election of Magnus, and claims that he was killed by the Geats, and that "at his death, power was transferred to Magnus". Magnus is not mentioned as king in any Swedish king-list, leaving a question-mark around his actual sphere of power.

== Reign ==
The few sources from this period indicate that Christianity was still not implemented everywhere. The Kalmar Crusade was conducted toward the Pagan province of Småland in 1123. The bishop of Uppsala, Siwardus, was appointed by the archbishop of Hamburg-Bremen in 1123 but forced to flee "by pagans" in 1130. Another bishop, Henry, was then appointed in Sigtuna by the Danish Archbishop Asser, and appears as a strong supporter of Magnus. The alterations also indicate the clerical rivalry between Hamburg-Bremen and the Danish archbishopric. There is also a story in Saxo's chronicle that Magnus at one time undertook a belated Viking expedition to a part of Sweden, and brought back a few heavy Thor's Hammers which he had robbed on a holy island. The still insufficiently Christianized Swedes henceforth saw him as a temple defiler who had robbed the gods.

Around 1127, Magnus married Richeza, daughter of Boleslaw III of Poland. The couple had two sons, Canute (born 1129, later to become king of Denmark) and Niels (born 1130). In 1130, Magnus backed Boleslaw III in conquering Rügen. The Polish forces together with a Danish fleet compelled the Rani to recognize Polish rule over the island.

== Civil war in Denmark ==
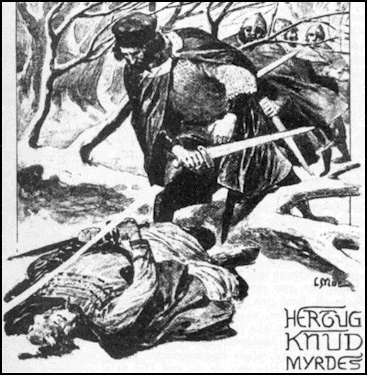
Magnus observes Canute Lavard's murdered body (Louis Moe, 1898)

In 1131, Magnus had his cousin and potential rival for the Danish throne, Canute Lavard, murdered. After this deed he had to return to Götaland, where he was still recognised as king. Though he was eventually backed by Niels, Magnus found himself in a civil war against Lavard's half-brother Eric Emune. The civil war weakened Magnus's position in Sweden. The Swedes chose a landowner from Östergötland, Sverker I, to be their king. According to Saxo's chronology of events this happened around 1132.

Magnus and his father Niels eventually engaged the enemy in the Battle of Fotevik in Scania on 4 June 1134. According to Saxo, Niels panicked and fled when Eric approached, but Magnus confronted his adversaries with a small troop of determined followers. "He preferred death to escape in order not to eclipse his old reputation for courage. Finally, when he had fought rashly and killed many enemies, he fell over the heap of corpses that had piled up around him." After the decisive defeat, Niels escaped with his ships but was killed later the same year.

== Legacy ==
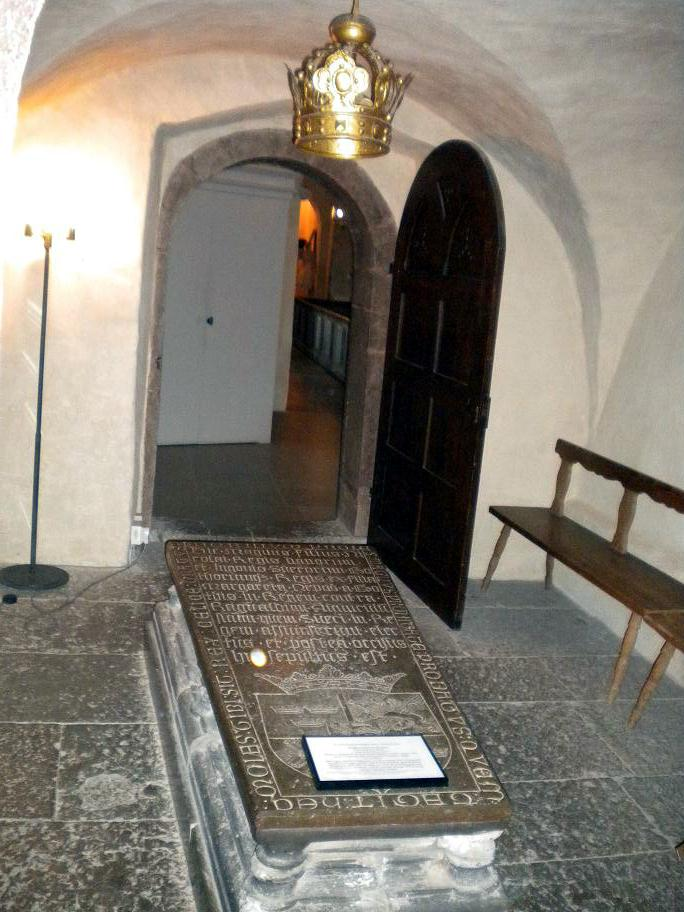
The grave monument of King Magnus was placed at Vreta in the 16th century but is a cenotaph. The location of his actual burial is not known.

After Magnus's death, his widow Richeza returned to the other side of the Baltic Sea where she married Volodar of Minsk. She later returned to Sweden and thirdly married the man who defeated Magnus, King Sverker I.

Magnus's son, Canute V, contested the Danish throne with his second cousin, Svend III. When Canute died in 1157, Magnus's legitimate descent became extinct. Canute's elder son Niels died in 1180. Canute's illegitimate posthumous son, Valdemar, bishop of Schleswig and prince-archbishop of Bremen, died in 1236 as the last direct male descendant of King Magnus.

== Literature ==
- Bricka, Carl Frederik, Dansk Biografisk Lexikon, vol. XI [Maar – Müllner], 1897. https://runeberg.org/dbl/11/0047.html
- Gillingstam, Hans. "Magnus Nilsson", Svenskt biografiskt lexikon, https://sok.riksarkivet.se/sbl/Presentation.aspx?id=10158
- Kosiarz, Edmund, Wojny na Bałtyku X–XIX w. Gdańsk, 1978.
- Sawyer, Peter. När Sverige blev Sverige. Alingsås: Viktoria, 1991.
- Saxo Grammaticus. Danmarks kronike, Vol. I-II. Kobenhavn: Aschenfeldt's, 1985 (ISBN 87-414-4524-4).
- Tunberg, Sven. Sveriges historia till våra dagar. Andra delen. Äldre medeltiden. Stockholm: P.A. Norstedt & Söners Förlag, 1926.
- Västgötalagen, http://project2.sol.lu.se/fornsvenska/01_Bitar/A.L5.D-Vidhem.html

Magnus Nielsen House of Estridsen Born: c. 1106 Died: 4 June 1134
Regnal titles
Preceded by Inge the Younger	King in Götaland; 1120s–c. 1132	Succeeded by Sverker the Elder
Preceded by Canute Lavard	Duke in Southern Jutland titled there: Duke of Denmark; 1130–1134	Vacant Title next held by Valdemar I the Great
