= Niels, King of Denmark =

King of Denmark from 1104 to 1134

Niels
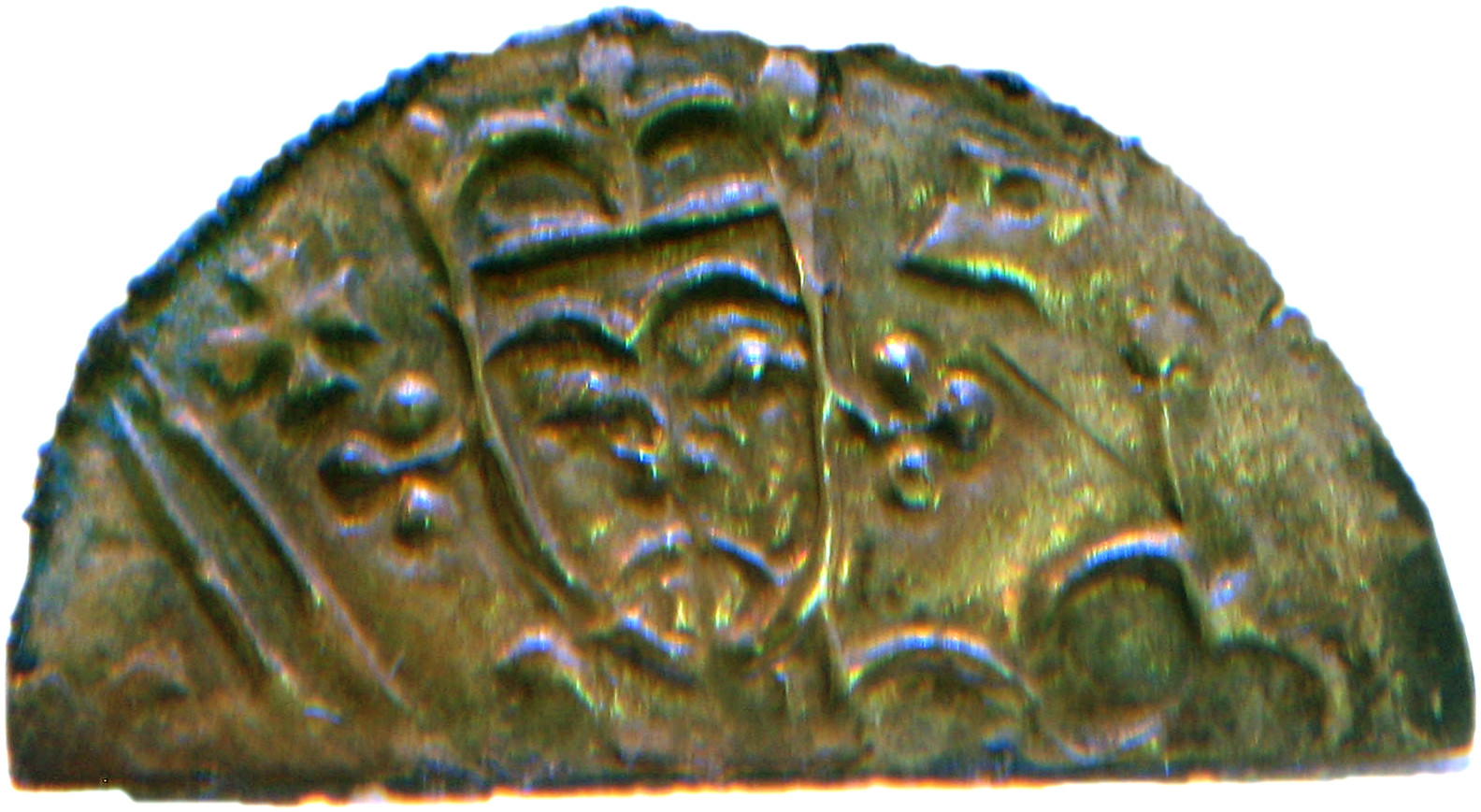
- Fragment of a coin depicting King Niels

King of Denmark
- Reign: 1104–1134
- Predecessor: Eric I Evergood
- Successor: Eric II Emune
- Born: c. 1063
- Died: 25 June 1134 (aged 70–71); Schleswig
- Burial: "boggy grave" in Gottorp
- Spouses: Margaret Fredkulla; Ulvhild Håkansdotter
- Issue more…: Magnus Nielsen
- House: Estridsen
- Father: Sweyn II of Denmark

Niels (c. 1065 – 25 June 1134) was the King of Denmark from 1104 to 1134. Niels succeeded his brother Eric Evergood and is presumed to have been the youngest son of King Sweyn II Estridson. King Niels actively supported the canonization of Canute IV the Holy and supported his son Magnus after he killed his rival for the succession, Knud Lavard. His secular rule was supported by the clergy. Niels was killed in an ensuing civil war and succeeded by Eric II Emune.

== Early life ==
Niels was born around 1063, married in 1105, and died in 1134. His parents were King Sweyn II Estridson and an unknown concubine. Four of Niels' brothers ascended the throne before him. He is first mentioned in history in 1086 when he was sent to Flanders to take the place of his exiled brother, King Olaf I. When his brother Eric Evergood died in July 1103 during a pilgrimage, Niels, who was the last surviving brother, was elected king the following year ahead of Evergood's chosen deputy Harald Kesja. He married Margaret Fredkulla, the daughter of Inge I of Sweden. She was believed to have wielded considerable influence during his reign.

== Policies and patronage ==
During the majority of Niels' reign, the country had internal peace. The contemporary Chronicon Roskildense describes him as mild and forthcoming, though not a competent ruler. He carried through reforms of his personal hird retinue, separating it into a military and an administrative branch responsible for tax collection. He placed family members as his jarls, including his son-in-law Jarl Ubbe and his nephews Eric (Emune) and Canute Lavard, who were the sons of Eric Evergood. Niels supported the canonization of his brother Canute IV the Holy by bestowing gifts on the clergy of Odense as he sought to enlarge the power and influence of the monarchy through the aid of the church. However, it is likely he did not win the full support of the magnates on Zealand. He also campaigned against the Wends in alliance with Poland. According to Saxo Grammaticus, Niels' son Magnus was elected King of Geats in 1220s.

== Civil war ==
His wife, Margaret, died in 1128 or 1129, and his son, Magnus, was forced from the Swedish throne in 1130. After 26 years of internal peace, conflict erupted between Magnus and his cousin Canute Lavard. Canute was popular in the Duchy of Schleswig where he was jarl and was seen as a potential successor to Niels. On 7 January 1131, Magnus slew Canute near Haraldsted just north of Ringsted. Niels initially condemned Magnus but eventually supported him, and a civil war ensued between Niels and the supporters of Canute's half-brother, Eric (Emune). Niels had his strongest base of support in Jutland, and the church also supported him. He secured support from the Holy Roman Empire by agreeing to subordinate the Danish Archdiocese of Lund in Scania to the German Archdiocese of Hamburg-Bremen, which prompted Archbishop Asser of Lund to support Eric.

Eric made little progress in Denmark and moved on to the battle for Scania in 1134. Niels and Magnus landed at Fotevik Bay in Scania in June 1134 seeking to deal Eric a decisive defeat. At the Battle of Fotevik on 4 June 1134, Niels and Magnus were taken by surprise by a contingent of German soldiers on horses. Niels escaped, while Magnus was slain. Niels sought refuge with Holy Roman Emperor Lothar III of Germany, but did not make it past the city of Schleswig. Niels ventured into the former city of Canute Lavard on 25 June 1134, despite warnings. "Should I fear tanners and shoemakers?," he supposedly remarked. He was greeted by the clergy, but he and his vanguard were slain before they could reach the royal palace as the townspeople turned against him. The almost sixty-year reign of Sweyn II Estridson's sons ended when Niels fell and Eric II Emune became king.

== Issue ==
Niels married Margaret Fredkulla, daughter of king Inge I of Sweden. After Margaret's death in either 1128 or 1129, he married Ulvhild Håkansdotter, who had been married to Inge II of Sweden and later married Sverker I of Sweden. Niels had two children with Margaret, and one child out of wedlock.

1. Inge Nielsen, who died as a child.
2. Magnus Nielsen
3. Ingerid of Denmark was born out of wedlock, and eventually went on to marry Jarl Ubbe Esbernsen, a descendant of Canute the Great.

Niels House of Estridsen Born: c. 1064 Died: 25 June 1134
Regnal titles
Preceded by Eric I	King of Denmark; 1103–1134	Succeeded by Eric II
