= Asser Thorkilsson =

Asser (or Ascer) Thorkilsen (fl. 1089 – 5 May 1137), a son of Thorkil (Svend) Thrugotsen and his wife Inge, was the Bishop of Lund from 1089, and then the first Archbishop of Lund from 1104 until his death.

He died on 5 May 1137 in Lund.

Preceded by Richwald	Archbishops and bishops of Lund; 1089–1137	Succeeded by Eskil
