= 11th century in Denmark =

- Other centuries
- 10th century | 11th century | 12th century

Events from the 11th century in Denmark.

== Monarchs ==
- Sweyn Forkbeard, 986–1014
- Harald II of Denmark, 1014–c. 1018
- Cnut the Great, 1018–1035
- Harthacnut, 1035–1042
- Magnus the Good, 1042–1047
- Sweyn II, 1047–1076
- Harald III, 1076–1080
- Canute IV, 1080–1086
- Olaf I, 1086–1095
- Eric I, 1095–1103

== Events ==
- 1013 – Sweyn Forkbeard again invades England, briefly taking the English throne.
- 3 February 1014 – Sweyn Forkbeard dies in Gainsborough, and Æthelred regains the English throne from the Danish.
- 18 October 1016 – Cnut the Great reconquers England at the Battle of Assandun. In the treaty which followed, Cnut gained control of all of England except Wessex.
- 30 November 1016 – Edmund Ironside dies, and his control of Wessex is handed over to Cnut.
- 12 November 1035 – Cnut dies, and the kingdoms of Denmark and England are once again made separate.
- 17 June 1040 – King Harthacnut lands at Sandwich and regains the English throne.
- 8 June 1042 – Harthacnut dies and Magnus the Good succeeds him as King of Denmark while Edward the Confessor becomes king of England.
- 9 August 1062 – Danish forces are defeated by Harald III of Norway at the naval Battle of Niså.
- 1064 – a peace agreement is reached between Harald III and Sweyn II, ending Harald III's invasions of Denmark.

== Births ==
- 1096 – Canute Lavard (died 1131)

Date unknown

- c. 1040 – Harald Hen (died 1080)
- c. 1042 – Canute IV of Denmark (died 1086)
- c. 1050 – Sweyn the Crusader (died 1097 in modern-day Turkey)
- c. 1050 – Olaf I of Denmark (died 1095)
- c. 1060 – Eric I of Denmark (died 1103 in Cyprus)
- c. 1062 – Bjørn Svendsen (died c. 1100 in Rendsburg)
- c. 1063 – Niels, King of Denmark (died 1134)
- c. 1078 – Asser Rig (died 1151)
- c. 1080 – Harald Kesja (died 1135)
- c. 1082 – Ingegerd Knutsdatter
- c. 1083 – Cecilia Knutsdatter (died c. 1131)
- c. 1084 – Charles the Good (died 1127 in Flanders)
- c. 1090 – Eric II of Denmark (died 1137)
- c. 1090 – Henrik Skadelår (died 1134)

== Deaths ==
- 3 February 1014 – Sweyn Forkbeard (born 963, died in England)
- 1026 – Ulf Jarl
- 12 November 1035 – Cnut the Great (born c. 990, died in England)
- 1035 – Svein Knutsson (born c. 1016)
- 25 October 1047 – Magnus the Good (born c. 1034 in Norway)
- 1074 – William of Roskilde
- 28 April 1076 – Sweyn II of Denmark (born c. 1019 in England)
- 17 April 1080 – Harald Hen (born c. 1040)
- 10 July 1086 – Canute IV of Denmark (born c. 1042)
- 18 August 1095 – Olaf I of Denmark (born c. 1050)

Date unknown

- c. 1018 – Harald II of Denmark (born c. 997)
- c. 1048 – Gyda of Sweden, Queen consort
- c. 1065 – Theodgar of Vestervig
