= Danish attacks on Norman England =

11th-century attacks

There were two Danish attacks on Norman England. The first was an invasion in 1069–1070 conducted in alliance with various English rebels which succeeded in taking first York and then Ely before the Danes finally accepted a bribe to leave the country. The second was a large-scale raid in 1075, intended to support the Revolt of the Earls, in which the Lincolnshire coast and York were both ravaged. A third attack was planned in 1085, and a large invasion fleet composed of Danish, Flemish, and Norwegian vessels was assembled which never sailed. All three attacks were motivated by a claim on the English throne asserted originally by Cnut the Great's nephew Sweyn II, king of Denmark (r. 1047–1076), and maintained by later Danish kings until as late as the 13th century, but neither of the two realised attacks succeeded in making Sweyn's claim good, or indeed gained anything for the Danes apart from a certain amount of plunder.

== Background ==
The various claims to the English throne in the mid-11th century, with kings of England named in bold

Sweyn Estridson was the nephew of Cnut the Great, king over an empire that included England, Denmark and Norway, and the first cousin of Harthacnut, king of England and Denmark. On Harthacnut's death Edward the Confessor became king of England, but when Sweyn visited Edward shortly thereafter he was, according to his own rather implausible claim reported by the later writer Adam of Bremen, given a promise that he would succeed to the English throne after Edward's death. For many years he was distracted from English concerns by a series of wars in Denmark, where he disputed the throne with first Magnus the Good and then Harald Hardrada; he could not rule his Danish kingdom in peace until 1064. So far as is known there were no supporters for his claim to the English crown when Edward the Confessor died childless in January 1066, and he may not have taken any steps to intervene during the resulting succession crisis. A 13th-century source, Heimskringla, reports that Tostig, estranged and exiled brother of the new English king Harold Godwinson, sought military help from Sweyn, but without success. A diplomatic mission sent by William, Duke of Normandy to Denmark seems to have secured a promise of neutrality in any Norman attempt on the English throne, though a contemporary writer, William of Poitiers, claimed, correctly or not, that Sweyn then sent troops to support Harold at the Battle of Hastings. In 1067, after William's coronation but before he had gained effective control of the whole country, English leaders appealed to Sweyn to intervene, and though he made no move he was certainly considered a dangerous threat by the Norman regime.

== Invasion of 1069–1070 ==
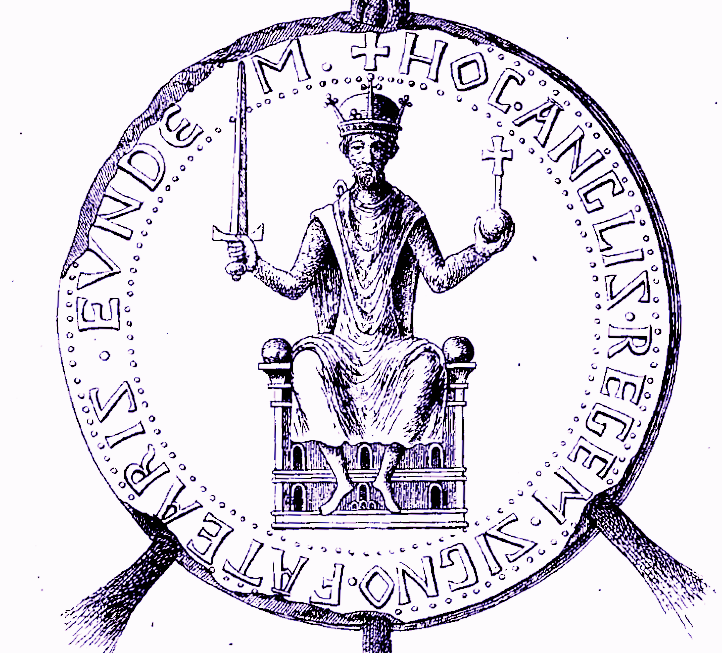
The seal of William the Conqueror

In January 1069 rebellion broke out in Northumbria when its newly-appointed earl, Robert de Comines, and a party of several hundred of his followers, were ambushed and killed. Another appeal for help was sent out to Sweyn by the Northumbrians, while William dispatched Æthelsige, abbot of St Augustine's, Canterbury, to Denmark to dissuade Sweyn from stepping in. English exiles at the Scottish court returned to England to join the rebels, but William quickly took his forces north and defeated them at York before returning to the south of England.

In August 1069 Sweyn finally launched an invasion fleet whose strength was variously estimated at 240 or 300 ships. The army it carried had been recruited not just in Denmark but reportedly in Norway, Frisia and Saxony and was commanded not by Sweyn himself but by his sons Harald and Cnut and his brother Asbjørn. Following the coast of the North Sea the fleet reached the coast of Kent and attempted to land first at Dover and then at Sandwich, but was repulsed at both places. A landing was effected at Ipswich, but local forces drove the Danish army back to their ships, nor did they succeed any better at Norwich. The Danes finally made for the Humber and, effecting a successful landing there, were joined by various English leaders, including Waltheof, Gospatric and Edgar Ætheling, a claimant to the throne. The Anglo-Saxon Chronicle says that these nobles were accompanied by "all the people of the country", which suggests a general uprising in Yorkshire, and that the combined force advanced on York "riding and marching in high spirits". They defeated in open battle the Norman garrison of York's two castles and took the city. William was in the Forest of Dean when he learned of the Danish fleet's landing, but he marched north. On learning of this the Danes abandoned the city, either to retreat to their ships or to establish a line of defence along the Humber, Aire and Ouse. William's army cleared Lindsey of a portion of the Danish army, forced a crossing of the River Aire and by Christmas had reoccupied York. After Christmas he proceeded to lay the northern counties waste in a brutal campaign known as the Harrying of the North, while the Danes came to an agreement with him that in return for a large payment and permission to feed themselves by ravaging the eastern coast they would leave in the following spring.

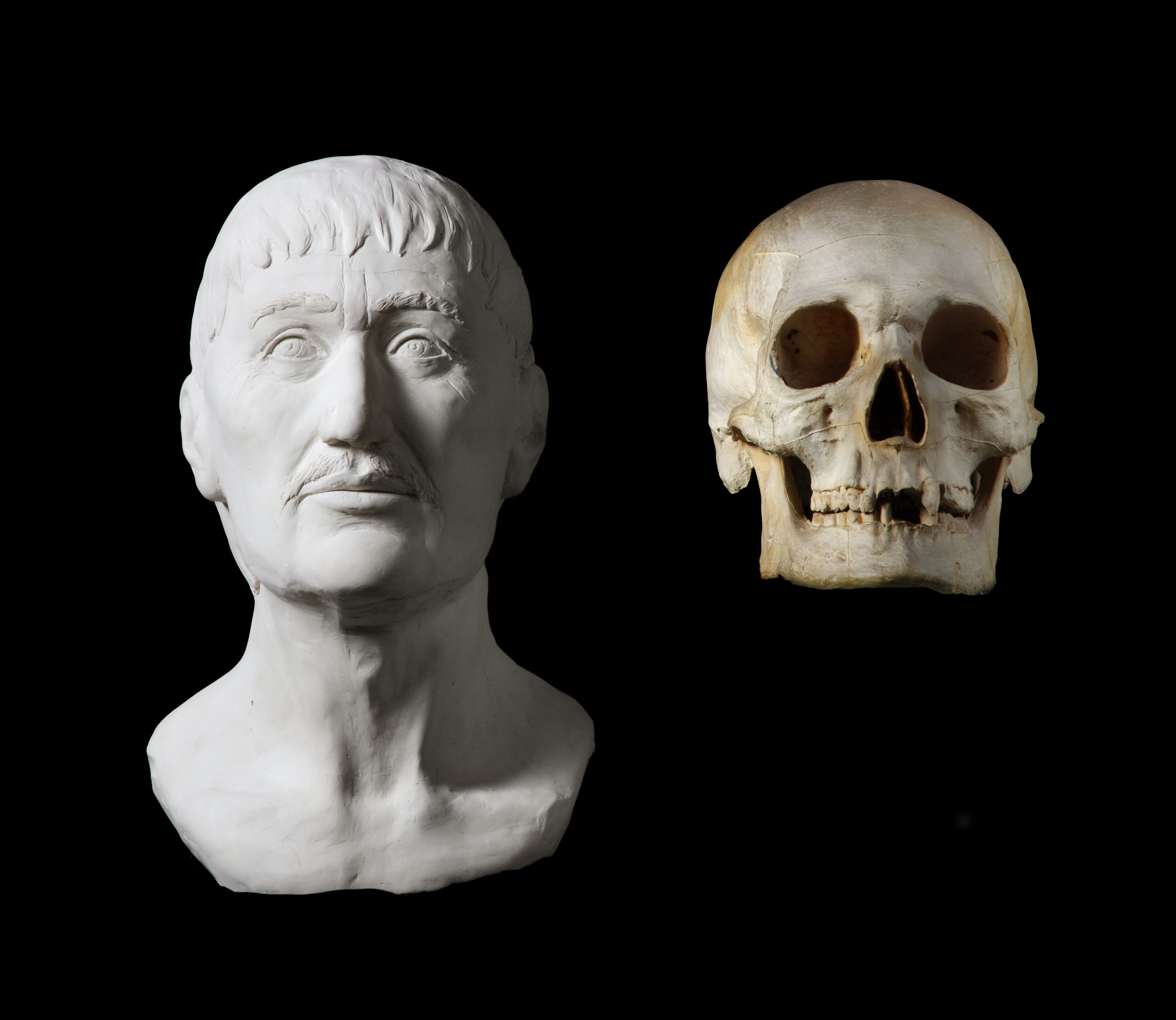
Bust of Sweyn Estridson made over the casting of a skull taken at the opening of his grave

In the spring of 1070 Sweyn Estridson himself joined the fleet, sailed it to the Wash, and from there marched his army to the Isle of Ely. The Anglo-Saxon Chronicle says that "Englishmen from all the fenlands came to meet them, thinking that they were sure to conquer the whole land"; among these was Hereward, a thegn from Lincolnshire, who proceeded to lead a band of men in sacking Peterborough Abbey. In the summer Sweyn and William came to an agreement, the terms of which are not known but which doubtless included another payment, following which Sweyn returned to Denmark.

It is believed that some time thereafter he was visited by his cousins Godwin and Edmund, the two eldest sons of Harold Godwinson, who were probably there to canvass for his active support in their attempts to reinstate the House of Godwin on the throne. They were disappointed in any such hopes, Sweyn's recent experiences not disposing him to launch another invasion on someone else's behalf.

== Raid of 1075 ==
In 1075 Ralph de Gael, Earl of East Anglia, Roger de Breteuil, 2nd Earl of Hereford, and Waltheof, pardoned veteran of the 1069 rebellion and now Earl of Northumbria, conspired together at the marriage-feast of Ralph de Gael and Roger de Breteuil's sister Emma to raise a rebellion against the king. Each returned to his own earldom, and messengers were sent to Denmark asking for help. Hostilities broke out while William was in Normandy, but his representative Lanfranc, Archbishop of Canterbury, together with those earls who remained loyal, were able to smother the rebellion without much difficulty. A Danish fleet of 200 ships under the command of Sweyn's son Cnut and a certain Earl Hakon sailed to Norfolk, but arrived to find they were too late to help the earls. The fleet then turned north, pillaging the lands on the Lincolnshire coast and sacking York, before turning south again and making for Flanders, their leaders doubtless realising that their force was too small to achieve anything more without English help.

== Invasion plans of 1085–1086 ==
Sweyn's son Cnut, a leader in both the 1069 and 1075 attacks and now king of Denmark as Cnut IV, had by the beginning of 1085 brought about an alliance with both Robert I, Count of Flanders and Olaf III, king of Norway, the intention being to collaborate in an invasion of England. According to the chronicler William of Malmesbury the combined invasion fleet, stationed in Limfjord, consisted of 1000 ships from Denmark, 600 from Flanders, and 60 from Norway, dwarfing both the 1069 and 1075 fleets; on the other side, William had no serious navy to oppose it, and could not have prevented it from landing. Instead, he brought over large numbers of mercenaries from Brittany, Maine and the crown lands of France, quartering them not just in the eastern coastal counties but apparently as far inland as Worcester. The Anglo-Saxon Chronicle claims that "the king gave orders for the coastal districts to be laid waste, so that if his enemies landed they would find nothing which could be quickly seized", but little evidence for this can be found in Domesday Book, and the damage may have been fairly minor. One 12th-century writer, Ælnoth of Canterbury, claimed that William's wide-ranging precautions extended even to ordering that Englishmen dress, shave and arm themselves in a French manner, "in order to delude the eyes of the invaders". However, on the other side of the North Sea Cnut's attention was increasingly turning to other problems, such as dealing with his rebellious brother Olaf and with aggression from the Holy Roman Empire. By the spring of 1086 William must have decided that the danger was past, since he stood his army down. In July 1086 Cnut was killed by rebels in Odense Cathedral, thereby decisively ending the threat of a Danish invasion, probably the last such threat England was ever to face. Arguably, this crisis had important results in motivating William to strengthen his ties with his more prominent subjects by exacting from them an oath of allegiance at Old Sarum, and to better understand his resources by initiating the Domesday Survey, though the causal link is not accepted by all historians.

== Later history of the Danish claim ==
The claim to the English throne was not renounced, and was revived occasionally through the 12th century. A Flemish continuator of Sigebert of Gembloux's Chronicon sive Chronographia even claims that king Eric III asserted it by launching an attack on England's borders in 1138, before being defeated by King Stephen. No English historical source mentions any such attack, nor does any Danish one, and the continuator's statement has consequently been ignored by most modern historians. E. A. Freeman in his History of the Norman Conquest and A. L. Poole in From Domesday Book to Magna Carta treated it as a confused reference to the Scottish army with which David I invaded England in that year, or to Danish soldiers attached to that army, and Peter Sawyer simply denied the existence of any such Danish attack. The historian Thomas Heebøll-Holm has however advanced arguments for its reality.

In the 1170s Richard FitzNeal, in Dialogus de Scaccario, mentioned the continuing existence of the Danish claim, and in 1193 the French king, Philip II, married a Danish princess with, according to William of Newburgh, the intention of inheriting her rights in the English throne. Nevertheless, the Danes had as late as 1206 still not abandoned their hopes of reclaiming England, if Lambert of Ardres is to be believed. In 1240 Matthew Paris wrote in his Chronica Majora that "rumours abounded in England that the Danes were preparing to invade the kingdom". These fears were probably groundless. There is no other evidence that Valdemar II, the then reigning king of Denmark, had an actual invasion fleet, and the English rumour was doubtless founded on English nervousness over Henry III's weakness in the face of foreign threats rather than on any concrete Danish plan.
