= St. Canute's Cathedral =

- Sankt Knuds Kirke
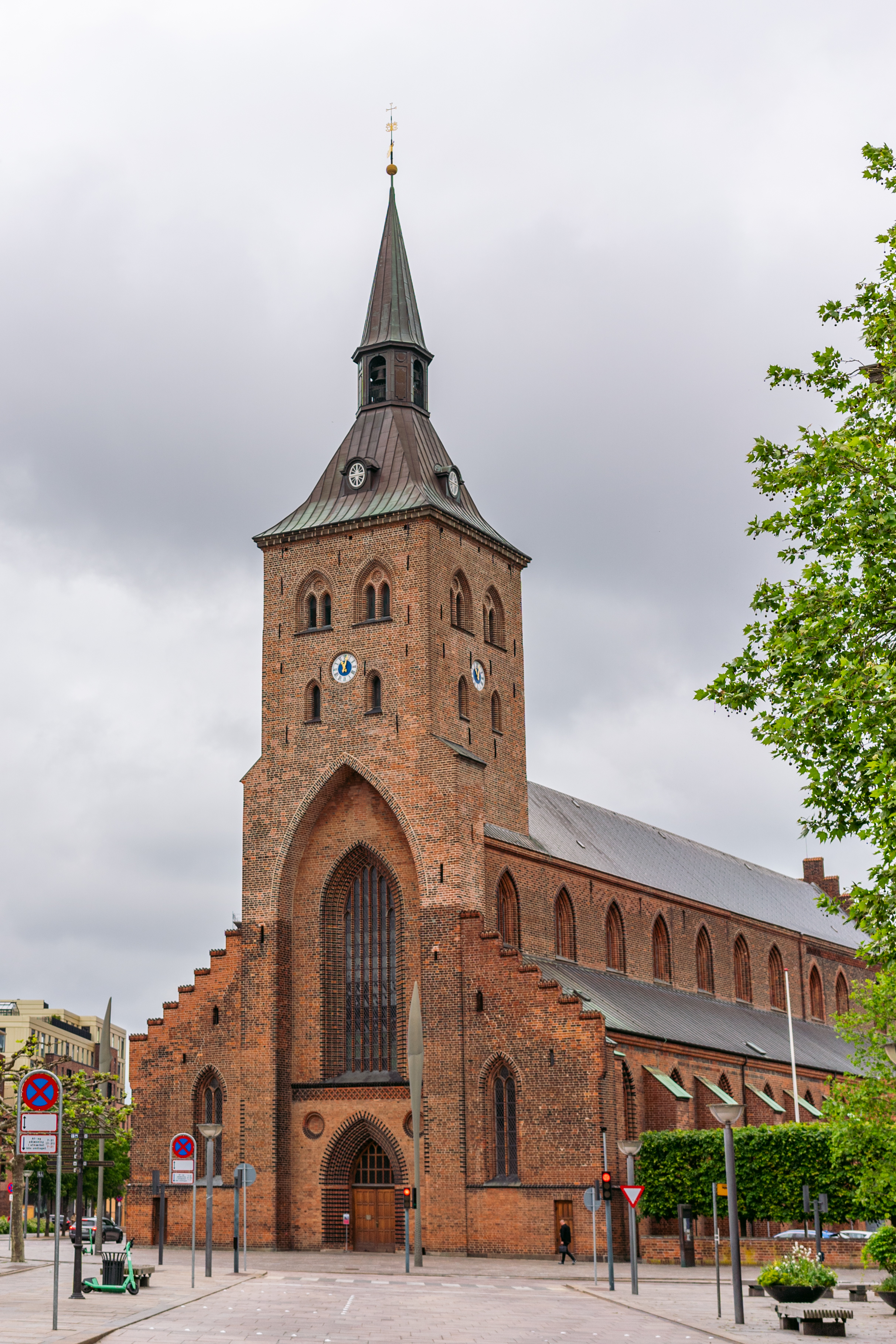

- 55°23′43.44″N 10°23′20.36″E
- Location: Klosterbakken 2 Odense, Southern Denmark
- Country: Denmark
- Denomination: Church of Denmark
- Previous denomination: Catholic Church
- Website: www.odense-domkirke.dk

History
- Dedication: St. Canute

Architecture
- Heritage designation: listed building
- Designated: 01-07-1918
- Architectural type: Basilica
- Style: Gothic
- Completed: 11th century 14th century

Specifications
- Materials: Brick

Administration
- Diocese: Funen
- Parish: Saint Canute

Clergy
- Vicar(s): Peter Ruge; Peder P. Thyssen; Anne Kathrine Rafn Hauge

St. Canute's Cathedral (Danish: Odense Domkirke or Sankt Knuds Kirke), also known as Odense Cathedral, is named after the Danish king Canute the Saint (Danish: Knud den Hellige), otherwise Canute IV. It is a fine example of Brick Gothic architecture. The church's most visited section is the crypt where the remains of Canute and his brother Benedict are on display.

== History ==
St. Canute's Church in one form or another has stood on Abbey Hill in Odense (Danish: Klosterbakken) for over 900 years.

Odense was established as the seat of the Bishop of Odense (Othinia) before 988 under the supervision of the Bishop of Schleswig, itself a suffragan of the Archbishops of Hamburg-Bremen. The diocese included the southern Baltic islands of Denmark. The earliest bishops' names have not been recorded. Odense passed to the jurisdiction of Roskilde in 1072 for a short period of time before falling to the Archdiocese of Lund.

The earliest known church on the present location was a travertine church which was reported under construction by Aelnoth of Canterbury, a Benedictine monk at the nearby St. Alban's Priory in 1095. The foundations of the travertine church can still be seen in the crypt of the present building. The church was built in Romanesque style with semi-circular arches supporting a flat timber ceiling. The travertine church was built specifically to house the earthly remains of King Canute, who was murdered in the church of St. Alban's Priory in 1086.

== King Canute IV of Denmark ==
Canute IV of Denmark was one of the sons of King Sven Estridsen. He participated in King Sweyn’s raid of England in 1069. In 1075 he accompanied the Danish fleet on its last great raid of England. When King Sweyn died in 1076, Canute's brother Harald Hen was elected king of Denmark and ruled until his own death in 1080, at which time Canute succeeded him on the throne of Denmark. Canute ruled Denmark from 1080 to 1086.

Canute reigned at a difficult time in Danish history. The idea of a strengthened monarchy did not sit well with the powerful feudal landowners, but it was just what Canute had in mind. After the death of his older brother, the national assembly (Ting) met on Zealand to proclaim Canute king of Denmark. Once the assembly had shouted their approval, Canute stood up and spoke to those assembled, both peasant and nobles: "You called my brother Harald the Whet-stone, but you will learn that I will be hard as granite!" (kampesten). Soon after, he ordered the people of Halland to supply him with horses and wagons to transport himself and his household throughout the kingdom. The assembly met to discuss the king's request. The people decided that the request was not lawful according to the ancient customs and laws they all knew. Canute was enraged by what he heard. "It is your right to hold fast to your rights and laws and bear only the burdens the law allows, but you must also accept that I am free to do with mine what I will, and I forbid you to let your swine graze in Halland's Great Forest which belongs to me!" After hasty consultations the Hallanders supplied the required equipment. Canute did the same in Scania (southern Sweden). At the assembly he required men and supplies to build the new Lund Cathedral. When the assembly baulked, Canute swore he would forbid them to fish in the Øresund. Likewise they too acceded to the king's request.

Canute was a devout Christian and believed that a strong central church in Denmark would give him more power. He was instrumental in improving the nationwide system of bishops by using his own local officials (fogeder) to collect tithes, a new tax, which were used to build the churches, hospitals and monasteries which were just beginning to be introduced into Denmark. Many people were Christian in name, but the old ways were only half-forgotten, and suspicions about foreigners ran high. Peasants were hard-pressed to put food on the table and the forced tithes infuriated peasants, merchants, and nobles alike.

Canute brought about the wrath of some of his chiefs when he hanged Jarl Egil Ragnarsen, his hand-picked governor of Bornholm, and most of his household for piracy. Many nobles took to the seas on occasion looking for a quick way to bolster income. The execution of a high-ranking chief caused more than one chief to reconsider his support for such a troublesome monarch.

Canute's headaches came to a head in 1085-86, when he decided to invade England and try to take the throne from William I who was old and by some reports failing. As a close relative of Canute the Great, Canute's claim was easily as valid as that of William of Normandy's. With the co-operation of Robert I, Count of Flanders, his father-in-law, Canute ordered an armada of 1,000 Danish ships and 60 Norwegian ships to assemble at Struer in the Limfjord, northern Jutland, in the summer of 1085. As had been the tradition since the first Viking raid on England, local chiefs gathered ships, supplies, sailors, and warriors for a share of the profits, loot, slaves, and treasure taken during the raid. Canute in the meantime travelled from assembly to assembly in southern Jutland ordering his people to pay tithes, a tenth of all their produce for the church. At the same time he tried to institute a poll tax (nefgjald) to raise money from the peasants. The tithes and new tax were not well received, and when his brother, Olaf, protested, Canute had him arrested and exiled to Flanders in chains, believing that Olaf was responsible for the growing unrest. It took so long to pacify the south that Canute was unable to come north for weeks. In the meantime, the Danes at Struer were hungry, bored, and very unhappy with the king. Finally they agreed that they would sail home. They told themselves that the weather would turn bad before they could complete a successful raid, and that such a late start would spell disaster. The order to assemble had not been made at an assembly, and was therefore unlawful in the popular view. To the Norwegians they said, "You can stay here in this place of starvation, if you will. We are going home."

When Canute arrived at Struer and found the fleet disbanded, he was furious. He thanked the Norwegians for their patience and sent them home. "Now we (Danes) will play," he said ominously. Canute blamed the wives of several leading chiefs from Jutland of causing bad weather and ordered his officers to collect such heavy fines from their families that it would have bankrupted all of them. Then he proceeded from assembly to assembly to outlaw any man, sailor, peasant or noble who left Struer until they paid a heavy fine, more than the annual income of any but the wealthiest nobles. Within days the peasants in Vendsyssel, the most northern part of Jutland, rebelled. Royal property was burned, and royal officials were tortured and murdered.

The Jute chiefs decided to cast their lot in with the peasants for once, and the rebellion spread rapidly. Canute and his household and other loyal followers fled from Jutland with the intention of returning to Zealand, where Canute had more support. He was convinced instead however to sail over to Funen and then on to the royal farm (gård) at Odense by his trusted adviser, Asbjørn Blak, who also persuaded the king that he could be reconciled with the great landowners and peasants.

Canute and his brothers, Benedict and Erik, and their housecarls went to the king's farm outside Odense. When the peasants and their leaders realized the king was at Odense, they raced to the king's farm, but Canute and Benedict fled into the little timber church of St. Alban's Priory near the river for sanctuary. The rebels refused to recognize sanctuary. "Come out to us, you devil. Too long you have used the edge of your sword to hurt your own people. Now you will feel the edge of our weapons!" Prince Benedict and several others defended the doors. The mob hurled stones and arrows through the windows shouting, "This is for stealing my cow! This is for taking my horses!" Since they couldn't get through the heavy outer doors, the mob tried to set fire to the church, but a light rain kept the fire from taking hold. They began tearing at the timber walls to get access. Prince Benedict shouted, "It would be better that you go home to thresh your grain than stand here and exchange blows with the king's men!" The remaining defenders retreated to the choir door which separated the altar area from the nave of the church. The floors ran with blood. "There he is!" shouted Blak, but before the traitor could move against the king, he was slain by Prince Benedict. The mob hacked Prince Benedict to death. Canute had received communion and tradition says he offered no resistance when he was killed at the main altar. Forensic evidence suggests he was speared from the front and had his skull smashed, perhaps by a stone thrown through an opening that had been torn through the wall of the choir. Prince Erik, later King Erik Ejegod, managed to talk his way out of the king's farm and fled to Zealand and then with his wife and child to Skania. The seventeen housecarls loyal to Canute were massacred within the confines of the church on 10 July 1086.

The Benedictine monks buried Canute and Prince Benedict in front of the main altar of the priory church. The story of Canute's death at the altar and his well-known devoutness quickly caught the popular imagination. When his queen, Adela of Flanders, came to move her husband's body to Flanders, a bright light shone around St. Alban's church. The queen left her husband where he was, and the faithful streamed to the church which housed the remains of their saintly king. Almost immediately there were reports of miraculous healings at the site of his burial. Blind, deaf, and lame were healed. Seven years of famine following Canute's death were another sure sign that Canute was worthy of veneration. His brother and successor, Olaf I, was given the nickname Hunger because he was unable to do anything about the famine that ravaged Denmark for years after Canute's death.

The unique circumstances of Canute's death was seized upon by the Roman Catholic Church as an example of saintliness for the newly converted peoples of Scandinavia. Canute was canonized in 1101 by Pope Pascal II. Some confusion exists among writers about the location of the new St. Canute's church thinking it rose on the site of the assassination, but St Alban's and St Canute's churches were not in the same location. The new cathedral, constructed in imported tuff stone, was constructed a little farther from the river, and was well underway before Canute became a saint. Aelnoth of Canterbury, an English monk, reported the building of St Canute's in 1095 and described the miracles reported at the site of Canute's grave. When the first church of St. Canute was completed, a three-day fast was proclaimed for the entire kingdom and the remains of Canute and Benedict were moved to the cathedral. It was believed that if the king was truly a saint that the shroud should be set on fire and the body would not be harmed. The shroud of Saint Canute was set alight, and the fire indeed left no mark upon the body of the king.

== Second St. Canute's Cathedral ==
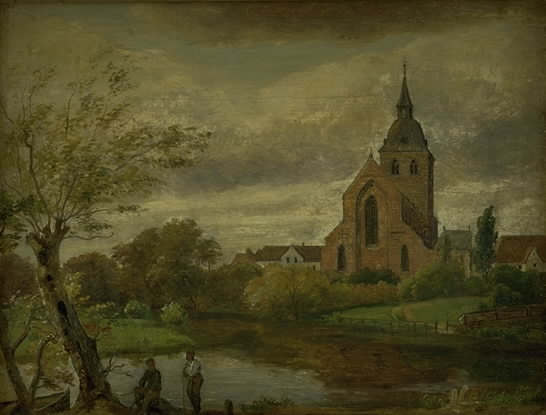
St. Canute's Cathedral on a painting by Dankvart Dreyer from c. 1844

During the civil war between Eric IV and his brother, Abel, Odense and the cathedral were burned down in 1247. The present church was constructed in several phases to replace the aging and inadequate stone church in about 1300 by Bishop Gisico (1287–1300). The new cathedral was built in Gothic style with its typical pointed arches and high vaulted ceilings. The building material of choice for the time was oversized red brick which was cheaper and easier to work with than the porous stone available. Portions of the stone cathedral were taken down and the new building expanded around the old.

In all it took approximately two hundred years to complete the cathedral, which was finally dedicated on 30 April 1499. The church was built in cruciform shape without a tower. The ancient crypt was expanded in such a way that pilgrims could visit the reliquary of Saint Canute beneath the raised choir without interfering with the canons' hourly services above. The canons also claimed they had relics of Saint Alban which Canute supposedly stole on his 1075 attack on Ely, England.

King Hans of Denmark (d. 1513) was buried in the cathedral in 1513. His wife, Christina of Saxony, who lived the latter part of her life in a nunnery in Odense, commissioned the famous German sculptor Claus Berg to create a magnificent burial chapel in the church of the Franciscan friary in Odense, where both she and her husband were laid to rest after her death in 1521. The son of Hans and Christina, King Christian II, with his wife Isabella of Austria and their son Hans, were exhumed from St. Peter's Abbey in Ghent, Belgium and reinterred in the royal family chapel in 1883. In 1807 the former Franciscan church was demolished, and Claus Berg's magnificent late Gothic altarpiece and the bodies of the four royals were transferred to St. Canute's Cathedral. The altarpiece is truly one of Denmark's national treasures. It was carved between 1515 and 1525. Each of the three sections is intricately carved and gilded. It survived the iconoclastic fervour of the Reformation perhaps because of its connection with the royal burials.

The single tower was completed in 1586 over the west entrance in the same style as the rest of the cathedral. Five bells hang in the tower. The oldest bell was cast in 1300 by Adam?. The next one was cast in 1597 by Jens Hansen. The next one was cast in 1677 by I. M. The next one was cast in 1767 by Leitze. The newest bell was cast in 1880 by M. P. Allerup.

In 1633 Valkendorf's Chapel was added, by all accounts a fine example of Renaissance artistry. Unfortunately it was dismantled in the great restoration of 1868.

Thomas Kingo was made the Lutheran Bishop of Odense in 1634. He was Denmark's most famous psalmist and produced a new hymnbook to which he personally contributed 85 hymns.

1752 Amdie Worm's spectacular organ was installed. The facade of the organ remains, but the organ has been expanded and improved to become the cherished voice of Odense Cathedral.

During restoration work in the 1870s, the crypt which had been closed since the Reformation was refurbished and opened as a chapel, and Saint Canute once more went on display.

== Gallery ==
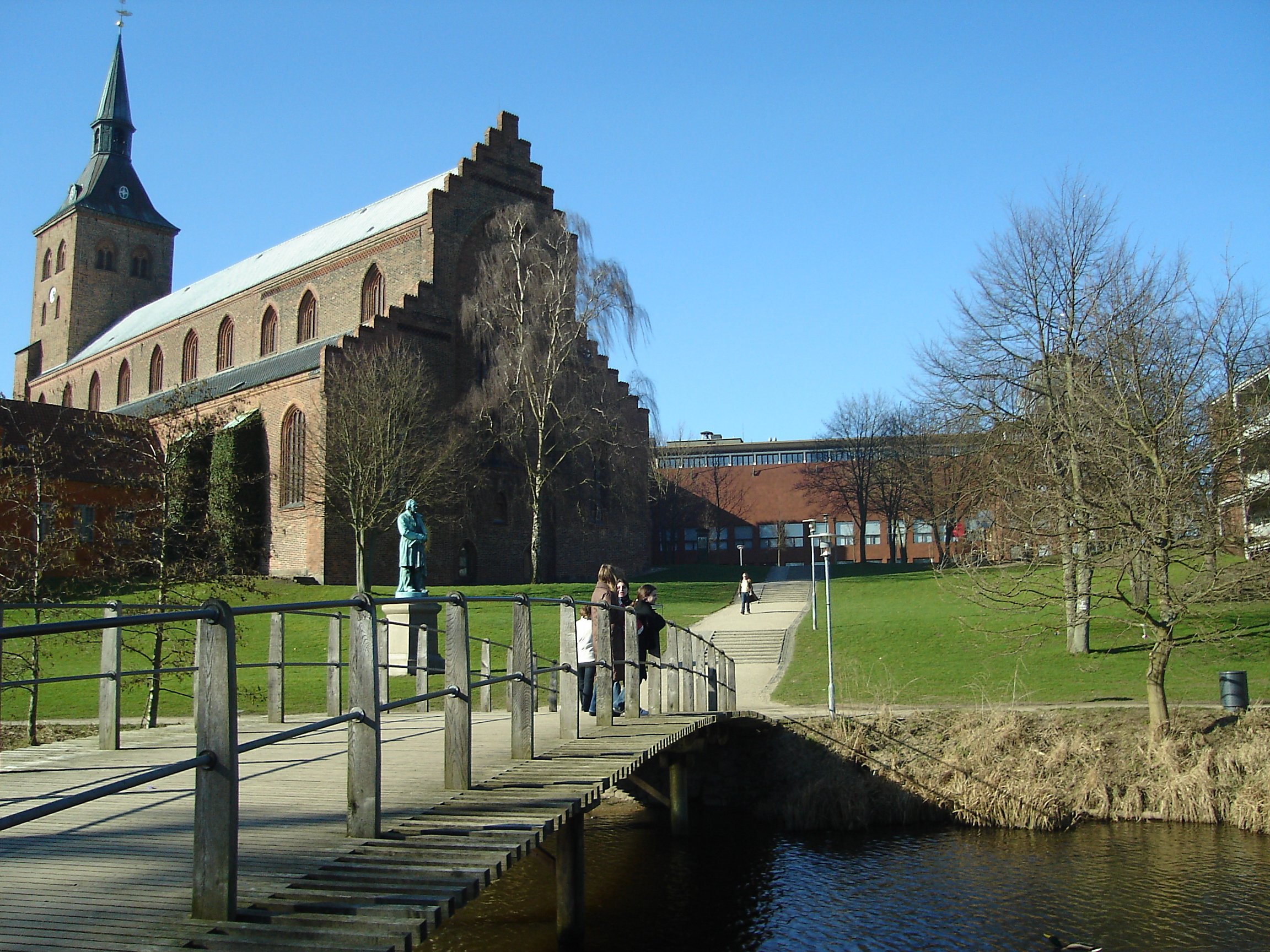
St. Canute's Cathedral seen from Eventyrhaven park. The statue represents Hans Christian Andersen. The yellow building stands on the site of the former St. Canute's Abbey

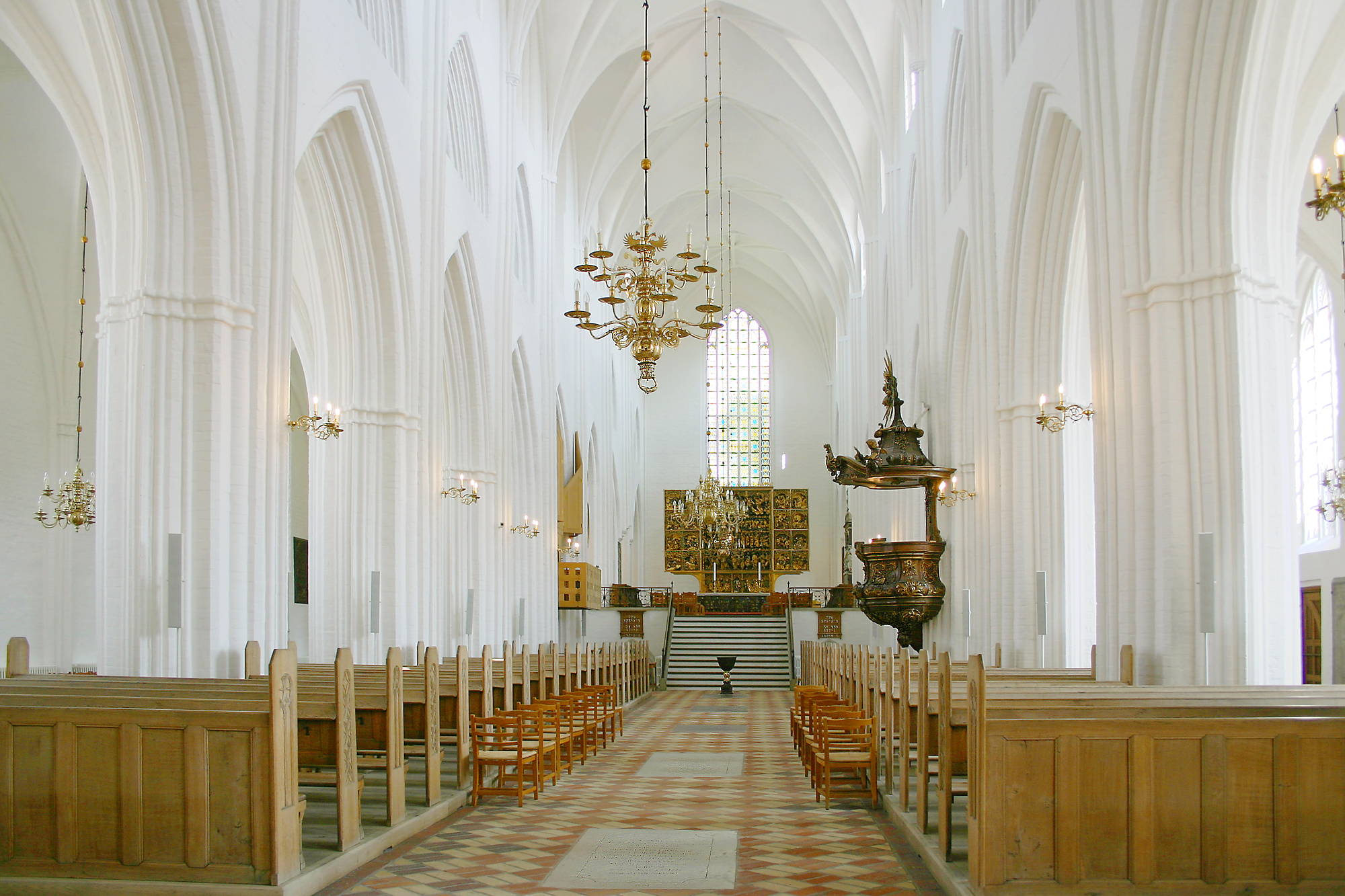
Nave

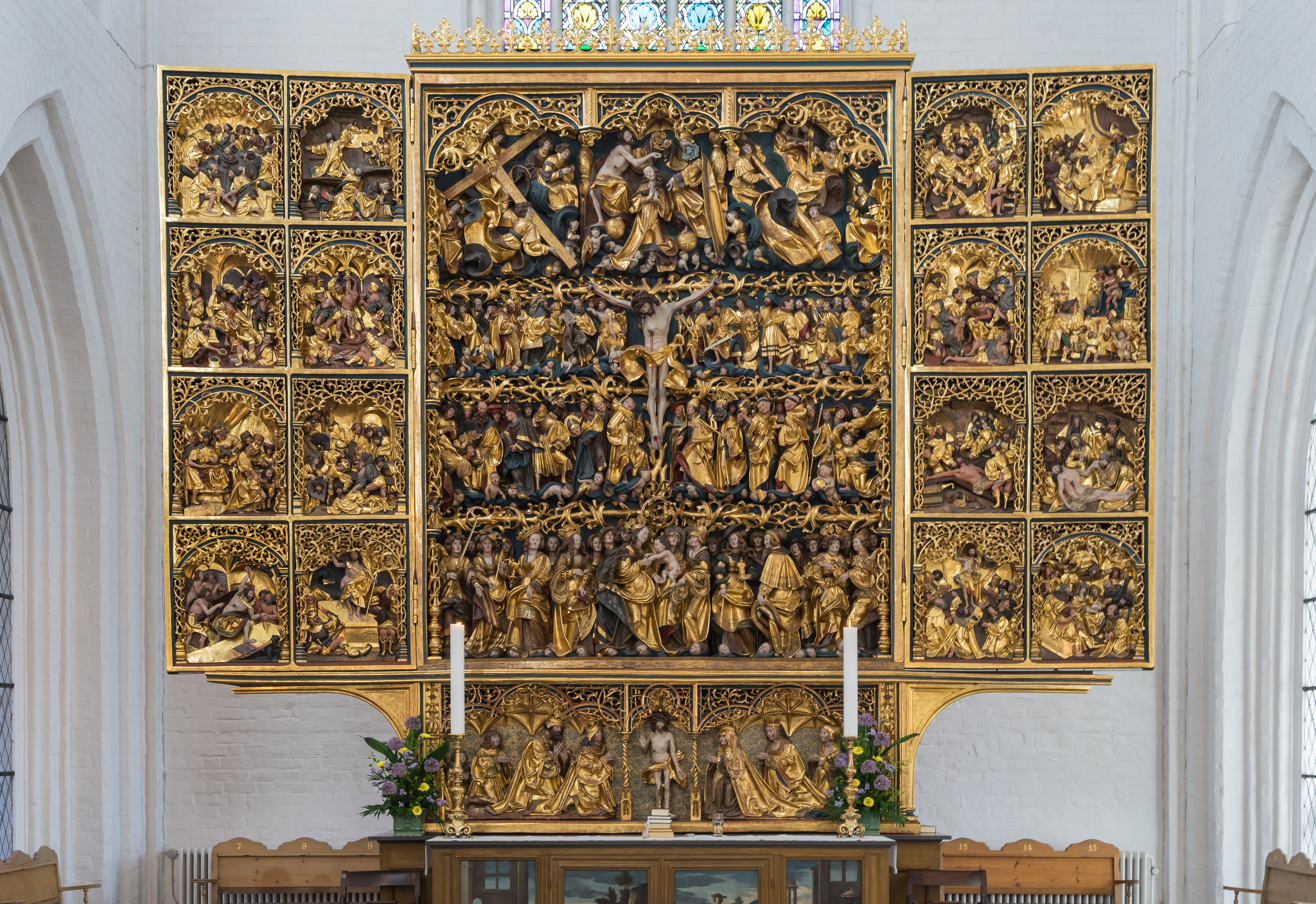
Altar by the sculptor Claus Berg.

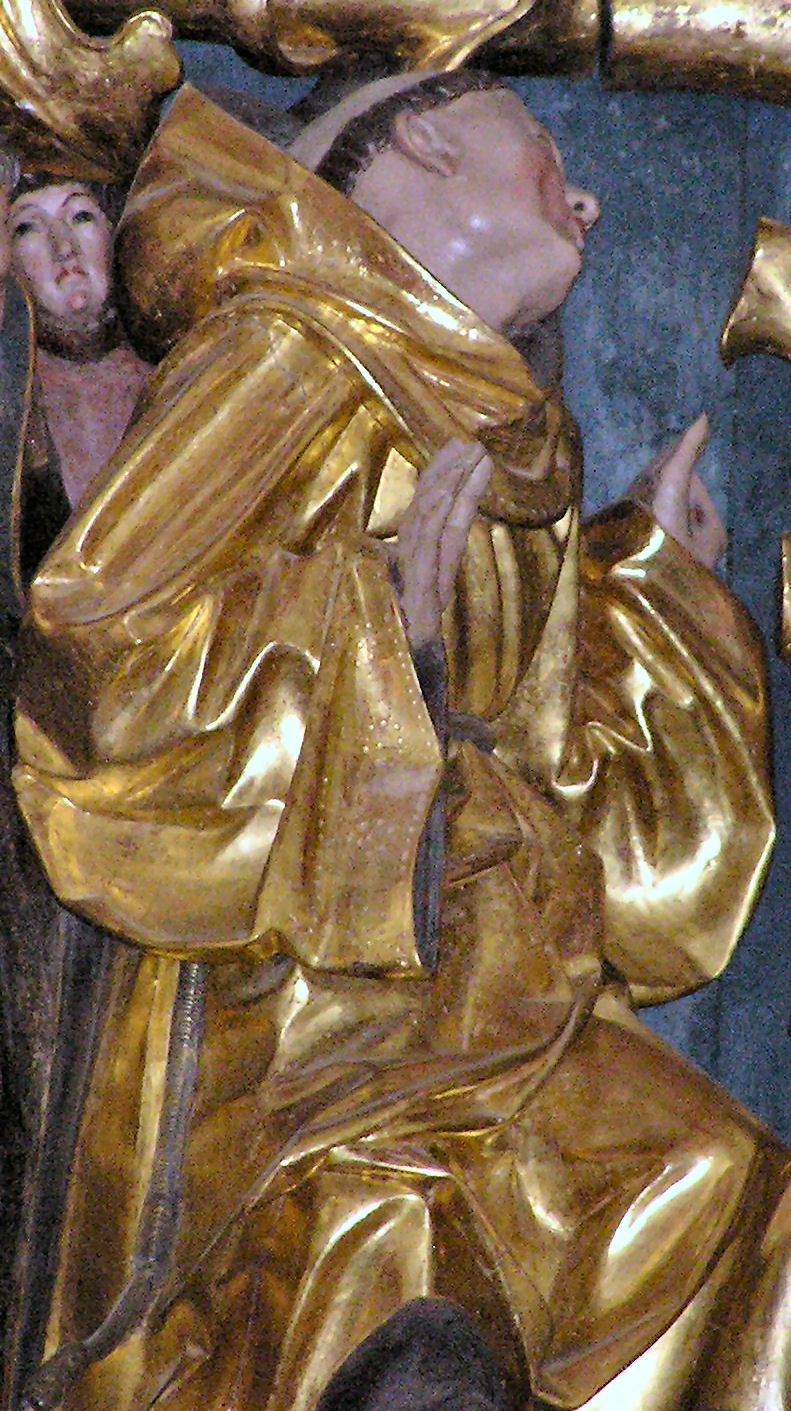
Detail of altar: a Franciscan friar, possibly intended for Brother Jacob the Dacian

Hans of Denmark, detail of grave monument by Claus Berg

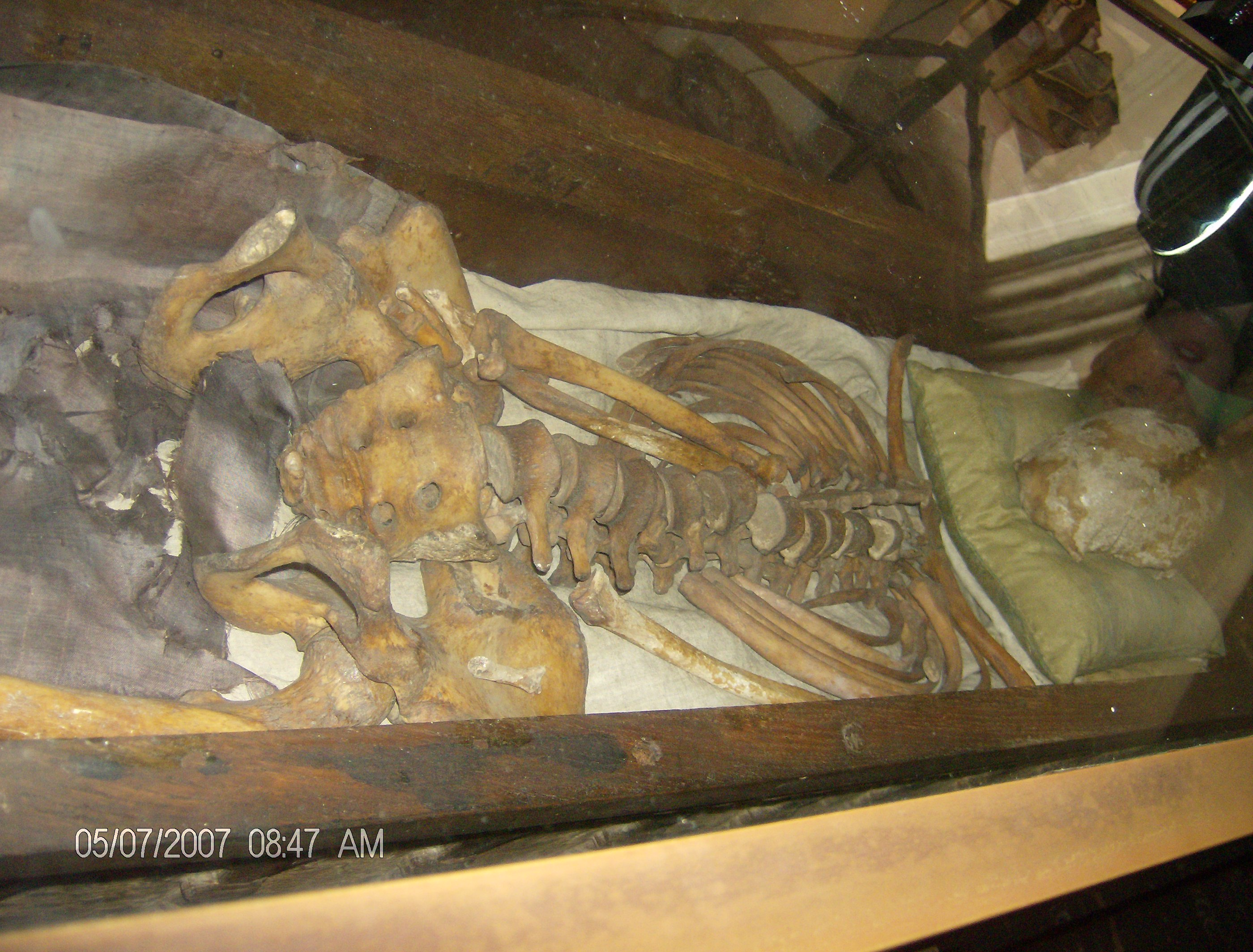
The bones of Saint Canute IV of Denmark interred in the cathedral named after him

== Other sources ==
- Hvidtfeldt, Arild (1985) Danmarks Riges Krønike (København: Peter Asschenfeldt's Bogklub) (in Danish) ISBN 9788773655870
