= RHS =

RHS may refer to:

== Education ==
=== United Kingdom ===
- Royal Horticultural Society
- Royal Hospital School, an independent naval school at Holbrook, Suffolk
- Royal Historical Society

=== United States ===
- Radnor High School, a public high school in Radnor, Pennsylvania
- Ralston High School
- Rangeview High School, a public high school in Aurora, Colorado
- Reepham High School
- Redlands High School, a public high school in Redlands, California
- Redmond High School (Oregon)
- Redmond High School (Washington)
- Renaissance High School (disambiguation)
- Reno High School, a public high school serving the city of Reno, Nevada located in Washoe County.
- Richmond High School (Richmond, California)
- Richmond Secondary School
- Ridgeline High School (Utah), a public high school in Millville, Utah
- Ridgeline High School (Washington), a public high school in Liberty Lake, Washington
- Riverview High School (Riverview, Florida)
- Rizal High School, a public school in Pasig, Philippines
- Robbinsville High School (New Jersey)
- Robbinsville High School (North Carolina)
- Roosevelt High School (disambiguation)
- Rosepine High School

== Other ==
- Ramsay Hunt syndrome, several medical conditions
- Rectangular hollow section, a type of metal profile
- Retired husband syndrome
- Revue d'histoire de la Shoah, an academic journal about the Holocaust (Shoah) published in France
- Right-hand side of an equation
- Rural Housing Service, in the USDA Rural Development Agency
- Right angle, hypotenuse and side, indicating a congruent triangle
- Rabbi Hershel Schachter, Rosh Yeshiva and Posek
