= Knútr Sveinsson =

Knútr Sveinsson may refer to:

- Cnut the Great (c. 995 – 1035)
- Canute IV of Denmark (c. 1042 – 1086)
