= Grey divorce =

Divorce of older couples in long-lasting marriages

Grey divorce or late-life divorce is the demographic trend of an increasing divorce rate for older ("grey-haired") couples in long-lasting marriages, a term typically used for people over 50. Those who divorce may be called silver splitters. Divorcing late in life can cause financial difficulties.

Grey divorce was documented in the United States as early as the 1980s, but wasn't labeled as such until around 2004. The phenomenon entered the public awareness with a 2004 AARP study and was further elucidated in Deirdre Bair's 2007 book Calling It Quits, which contained interviews with grey divorcees. Some prominent examples include politicians and businesspeople. The former American vice-presidential couple Tipper and Al Gore separated after over 40 years of marriage; research and writing duo Masters and Johnson divorced in 1993 after over 20 years of marriage; music duo Captain & Tennille divorced in 2014 after 39 years of marriage; and the world's fourth-richest man, Bill Gates, and his wife Melinda French Gates, were married for 27 years and divorced in May 2021.

== Society-wide effects ==
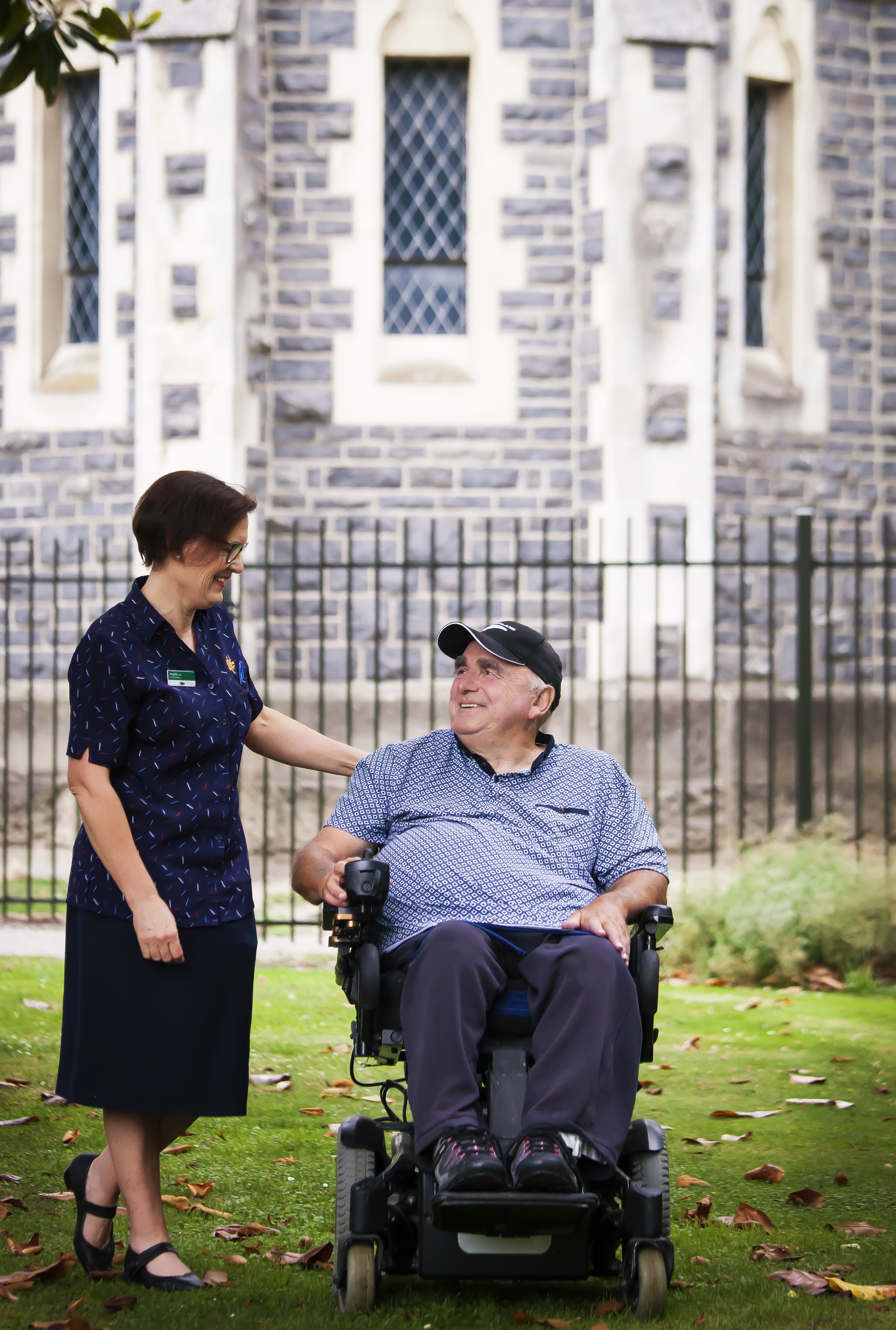
Like people who are single for other reasons, silver splitters may need to hire professional caregivers as they age.

Couples who divorce late in life affect the housing market. Whereas before the divorce, two older people may live in a single-family home, after the divorce, it is typical for at least one of them to live alone during the first few years after the divorce. Although some silver splitters will move in with adult children, a romantic partner, or a roommate, most do not remarry. Exchanging one married couple sharing a home for two single people living apart increases the demand for smaller and less expensive housing options, such as one-bedroom apartments. Many older single people need to find not only a home to live in, but a home that is affordable, will be safe and accessible as they age, and is near healthcare, transportation, and other needed services.

Living together as a married couple also provided both people in the marriage with some level of live-in mutual assistance. After the divorce, especially if they are living alone, they may not have access to assistance with household or financial tasks, with driving, or with activities of daily living when they are sick or if they become disabled. This increases the demand from aging people for social services, such as public transportation, professional caregiving, and subsidized or affordable housing.

Grey divorces tend to be financially harmful to the individuals. In addition to higher expenses (e.g., to maintain two homes instead of one shared home), the assets previously shared by the couple are divided. Many are either retired or close to retirement, so they have fewer opportunities to earn or save more money than a person who divorced at a younger age. Any retirement savings that survive the divorce have little time to grow again.

They are also at risk of becoming socially isolated and lonely. Many people enjoy the autonomy of living alone, but loneliness can become a problem, especially as they age, or if they have no family. The rising number of elderly people living alone has encouraged research into automated assistance tools and robots that can provide friendly companionship, especially in Japan.

== In the United States ==
Grey divorce was documented in the United States as early as the 1980s, but wasn't labeled as such until around 2004. The phenomenon entered the public awareness with a 2004 AARP study and was further elucidated in Deirdre Bair's 2007 book Calling It Quits, which contained interviews with grey divorcees.

Former American vice-presidential couple Tipper Gore and Al Gore separated after over 40 years of marriage; research and writing duo Masters and Johnson divorced in 1993 after over 20 years of marriage; music duo Captain & Tennille divorced in 2014 after 39 years of marriage; and the world's fourth-richest man, Bill Gates, and his wife Melinda French Gates, were married for 27 years and divorced in May 2021.

As of 2023, in the US, about one-third of divorces involve people over the age of 50. The divorce rate for people over the age of 50 doubled between 1990 and 2010. By 2013, the number of divorcees over the age of 50 exceeded the number of widowed people (these numbers include people who divorced or survived the death of their spouses at any age). Silver splitters have less than a 50% chance of remarrying; about one in five women will remarry, and about two out of five men.

Possible causes for a higher rate of divorce among older people include the increase in human longevity, the cultural values of Baby Boomers, and women's increasing financial independence as potential causes. Women are somewhat more likely to initiate divorce proceedings, and they benefit emotionally far more than financially.

Financial challenges include identifying and fairly dividing retirement savings, navigating the process of getting qualified domestic relations orders for any defined benefit pension plans, and agreeing on any temporary alimony payments. Social Security benefits, assuming the marriage lasted at least 10 years, are relatively standardized for divorcing couples. These financial challenges, on average, disproportionately harm women. Their standard of living nearly halves, while men's declines by about 20%.

== In Japan ==
The divorce rate among older Japanese couples has soared as the baby boomer cohort have retired and the general population has aged. The number of divorces among couples married for 20 years or more hit 42,000 in 2004, double those recorded in 1985. Divorces among those married for more than 30 years quadrupled during the same period. The 2022 statistics showed that 23.5% of divorces in Japan were after at least two decades of marriage, the highest rate since records began in 1947. Stress felt by an older Japanese married woman is referred to as retired husband syndrome (主人在宅ストレス症候群). While devoting years to his career in a workaholic lifestyle, a Japanese husband may rarely see his family, and as a result, a husband and wife may not interact extensively. When the husband retires, both can feel they are living with a virtual stranger. This can cause particular stress for the wife who is expected to attend to her husband's every need. The stress of change in lifestyle brings a number of problems, including feelings of resentment towards husbands.

== In the United Kingdom ==
Older couples are responsible for the overall increase in the divorce rate in the United Kingdom in the twenty-first century. In England and Wales in 2021, one in four divorces occurred after the age of 50. Between 2005 and 2015, the number of men divorcing aged 65+ went up by 23% and the number of women aged 65+ divorcing increased by 38%.

== See also ==
- Mid-life crisis
- Baby Boom Generation
