= 10th century in Denmark =

The 10th century in Denmark saw the emergence of the country into historical records and the conversion of the country to Christianity. The 950s are when the first records of the state of Denmark (Tan-marker) appeared.

== Monarchs ==
- Gorm the Old, 940–958
- Harald Bluetooth, 940–986
- Sweyn Forkbeard, 986–1014

== Events ==
910s

- 911 – The Vikings settle in Normandy

940s

- 940 – Around this year, Harald Bluetooth becomes king, ruling with his father Gorm the Old. Bluetooth will later impose Christianity on his people.
- 942 – William I, Duke of Normandy offers asylum to Harald, and restores him to his throne by force. William I is assassinated later that year. However, the "Haigrold" described by the chronicler was possibly King Harald Greycloak of Norway or different Viking.
- 947 – The Norwegian Eric Bloodaxe is elected King of York. He is deposed when the English king Eadred marches north, and flees to Denmark.
- 949 – Eric Bloodaxe returns from Denmark to England. He will be killed in battle in 952.

950s

- 950 – Gorm the Old conquers most of Denmark.
- 950 – Denmark under Gorm's son Harald Bluetooth conquers Norway.
- 958 – Gorm the Old dies and Harald Bluetooth becomes sole king, succeeding his father.

960s

- c. 965 – Harald Bluetooth raises the larger Jelling Stone, taking credit for the unification of Denmark and Christianizing the Danes.
- 965 – Tartushi visits Hedeby.

970s

- 970 – the wedding of Harald Bluetooth and Tove of the Obotrites
- 974 – Hedeby falls to the Holy Roman Empire
- 975 – Harald Bluetooth tries to force Christianity upon Haakon Sigurdsson, who then turns against him.

980s

- 980s – Viking raids against England resume during the minority of Æthelred the Unready.
- 980 – Struggling to unite Denmark, Harald Bluetooth builds at least four large circular forts around this time.
- 980 – Harald Bluetooth builds the first church in Zealand at Roskilde.
- 983 – Hedeby returns to Denmark from the Holy Roman Empire.
- 984 – The ladies of Denmark give their gold and silver ornaments to the Jutlanders in exchange for the release of Sweyn Forkbeard.
- 987 – Eric the Victorious, king of Sweden, expels Sweyn Forkbeard.
- 988 – First known mention of Odense in writing.
- 988 – Sweyn seizes power from his father, Harald Bluetooth.

== Births ==
- c. 910 – Gunnhild, Mother of Kings (died c. 980 in Orkney)
- c. 948 – Valtoke Gormsson (died 986 in Sweden)
- c. 960 – Sweyn Forkbeard (died 1014 in England)
- c. 990 – Cnut the Great (died 1035 in England)
- c. 997 – Harald II of Denmark (died c. 1018)

== Deaths ==
- c. 958 – Gorm the Old (born before 900)
- c. 988 – Reginbrand
