= Margareta Hasbjörnsdatter =

Queen of Denmark from 1076 to 1080

- Queen consort of Denmark
- Reign: 1076–1080
- Born: unknown (before 1076)
- Died: unknown (after 1080)
- Burial: Roskilde Cathedral
- Spouse: Harald III of Denmark
- Father: Asbjörn Ulfsen

Margareta Hasbjörnsdatter or Margareta Asbjørnsdatter (11th century) was Queen consort of Denmark as the wife of King Harald III.

Margareta was the daughter of jarl Asbjörn Ulfsen, possibly an uncle of her spouse; she would thereby have been her husband's cousin. No children are known from the marriage. The dates of her birth and death are unknown.

A DNA test in 2003 dispelled the centuries-old legend that Estrid Svendsdatter was buried in the northeastern pier of the Roskilde Cathedral. The new theory is that the sign on the pier refers to Margareta Hasbjörnsdatter, who was also known as Estrid.

== Literature ==
- Henning Dehn-Nielsen: Kings and Queens of Denmark. Kopenhaga: 2007. ISBN 978-87-89542-71-3.
- Kay Nielsen, Ib Askholm: Danmarks kongelige familier i 1000 år. 2007. ISBN 978-87-91679-09-4.

Preceded by Gunhild Sveinsdotter	Queen consort of Denmark; 1076–1080	Succeeded by Adela of Flanders
