= Svend Høra =

Legendary Danish pirate

Svend Høra was according to legend a Danish pirate chief who was killed at Drastrup in 1100.

According to the legend he plundered together with his pirate gang along Randers Fjord, but peasants from Rougsø blocked their way back by damming the fjord with logs near Uggelhuse. There the peasants attacked the pirates and killed them all except Svend Høra, whom they instead hung from a gallows on a hill at Ørnebjerg. Subsequently, the hill was called Svendshøj (Svend's Hill), and the gully by it Svendsdal (Svend's Valley).

In 1784 the historian Peter Friderich Suhm thought that Svend Høra was a king, believing him identical to the Southern Jutish king Svend Langfod, and that he was killed in a battle in Svendsdal and buried there in 900.
