= Canute IV of Denmark =

King of Denmark from 1080 to 1086

Saint Canute IV
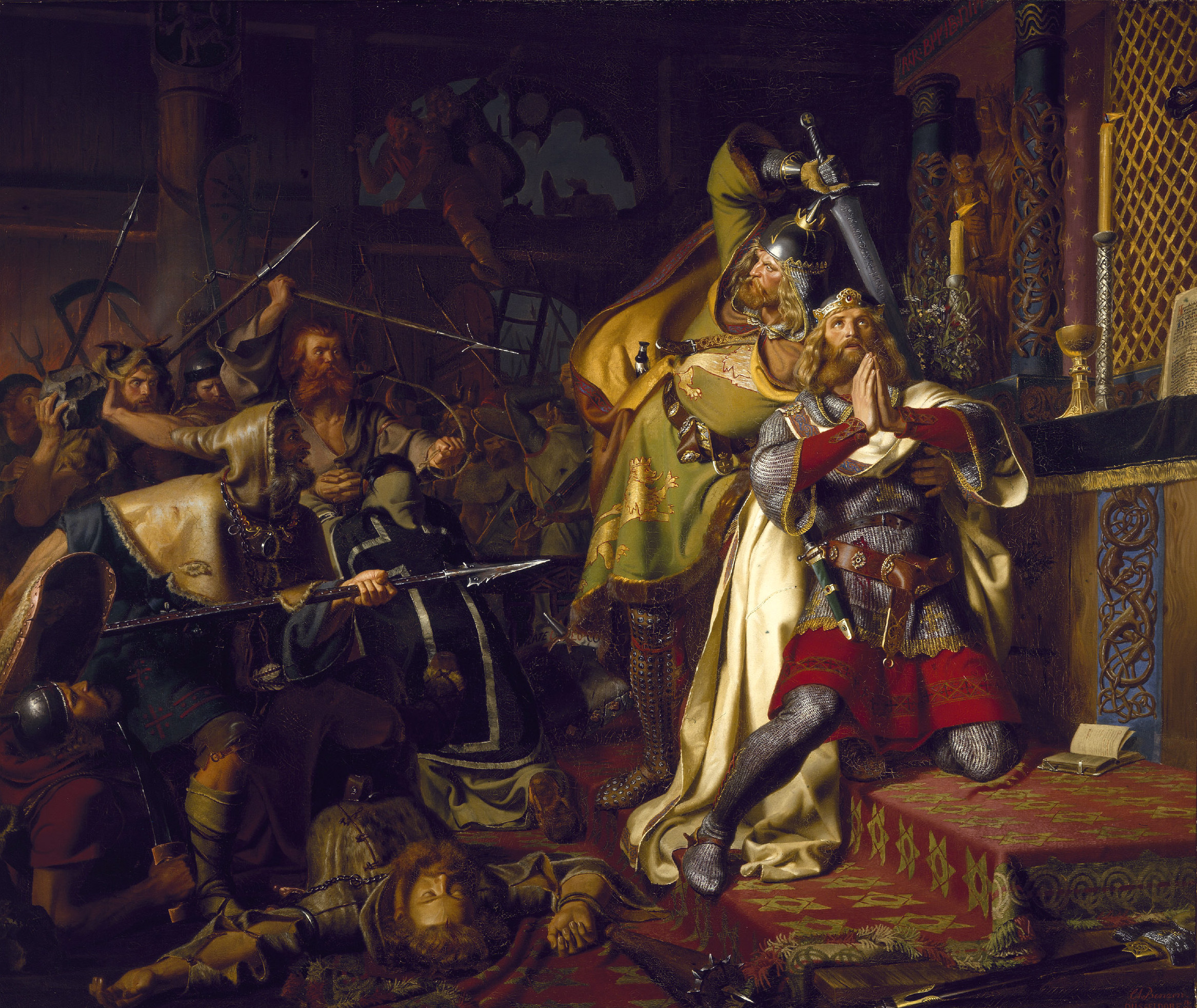
- Legendary painting of the death of Canute IV of Denmark in the Church of Saint Albanus

King of Denmark
- Reign: 1080–1086
- Predecessor: Harald III
- Successor: Olaf I
- Born: c. 1042
- Died: 10 July 1086 (aged 43–44); St. Alban's Priory, Odense
- Burial: St. Canute's Cathedral, Odense
- Spouse: Adela of Flanders
- Issue: Charles I, Count of Flanders; Cecilia Knutsdatter; Ingegerd Knutsdatter
- House: Estridsen
- Father: Sweyn II of Denmark
- Religion: Roman Catholicism

Saint Canute
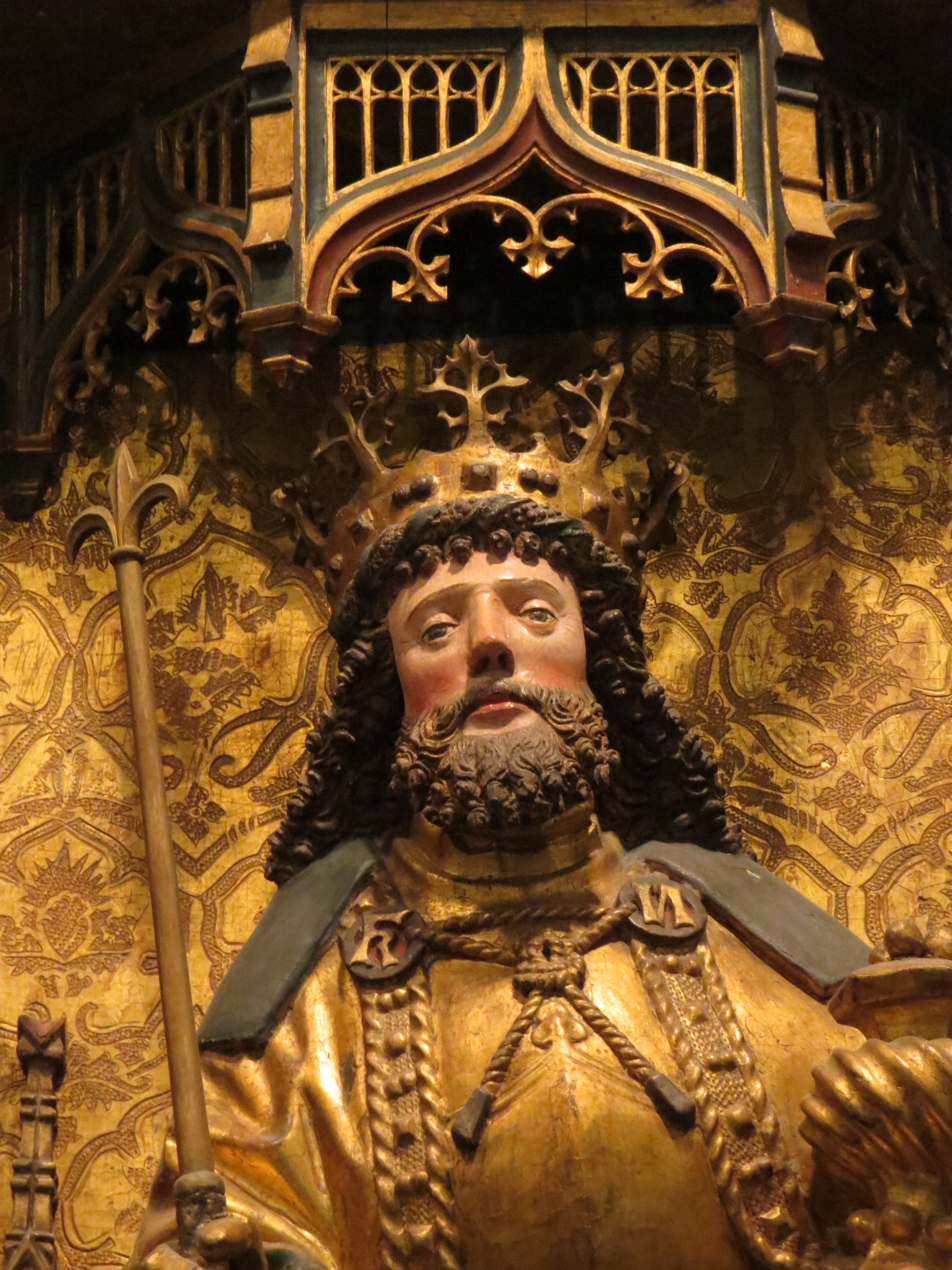
- Statue of Saint Canute at St. Peter's Church, Næstved, in Odense, Denmark

King of Denmark and Martyr
- Born: c. 1042
- Died: 10 July 1086 (aged 43–44); St. Alban's Priory, Odense
- Cause of death: Martyrdom
- Venerated in: Roman Catholicism
- Canonized: 19 April 1101 by Pope Paschal II
- Major shrine: St. Canute's Cathedral
- Feast: 10 July (Catholic Church)
- Patronage: Denmark

Canute IV (c. 1042 – 10 July 1086), later known as Canute the Holy (Danish: Knud IV den Hellige) or Saint Canute (Sankt Knud), was King of Denmark from 1080 until 1086. Canute was an ambitious king who sought to strengthen the Danish monarchy, devotedly supported the Roman Catholic Church, and wanted the English throne. Slain by rebels in 1086, he was the first Danish king to be canonized. He was recognized by the Roman Catholic Church as patron saint of Denmark in 1101.

== Life ==
Canute was born c. 1042, one of the many sons of Sweyn II Estridsson by an unknown mistress. He is first noted as a member of Sweyn's 1069 raid on England, and the Anglo-Saxon Chronicle reports that Canute was one of the leaders of another raid against England in 1075. When returning from England in 1075, the Danish fleet stopped in the County of Flanders. Because of its hostility towards William I of England, Flanders was a natural ally for the Danes. He also led successful campaigns to Sember and Ester, according to skald Kálfr Mánason.

When Sweyn died, Canute's brother Harald III was elected king, and as Canute went into exile in Sweden, he was possibly involved in the active opposition to Harald. On 17 April 1080, Harald died, and Canute succeeded him to the throne of Denmark. On his accession, he married Adela, daughter of Count Robert I of Flanders. They had one son, Charles, who was born in 1084, and twin daughters Cæcilia (who later married Erik Jarl) and Ingerid (who later married Folke the Fat), who were born shortly before his death (ca. 1085/86). Ingerid's descendants, the House of Bjälbo, would ascend to the throne of Sweden and Norway and Canute IV's blood returned to the Danish throne in the person of Olaf II of Denmark.

=== King of Denmark ===
Canute quickly proved himself to be a highly ambitious king as well as a devout one. He enhanced the authority of the church, and demanded austere observation of church holidays. He gave large gifts to the churches in Dalby, Odense, Roskilde, and Viborg, and especially to Lund. Ever a champion of the Church, he sought to enforce the collection of tithes. His aggrandizement of the church served to create a powerful ally, who in turn supported Canute's power position.

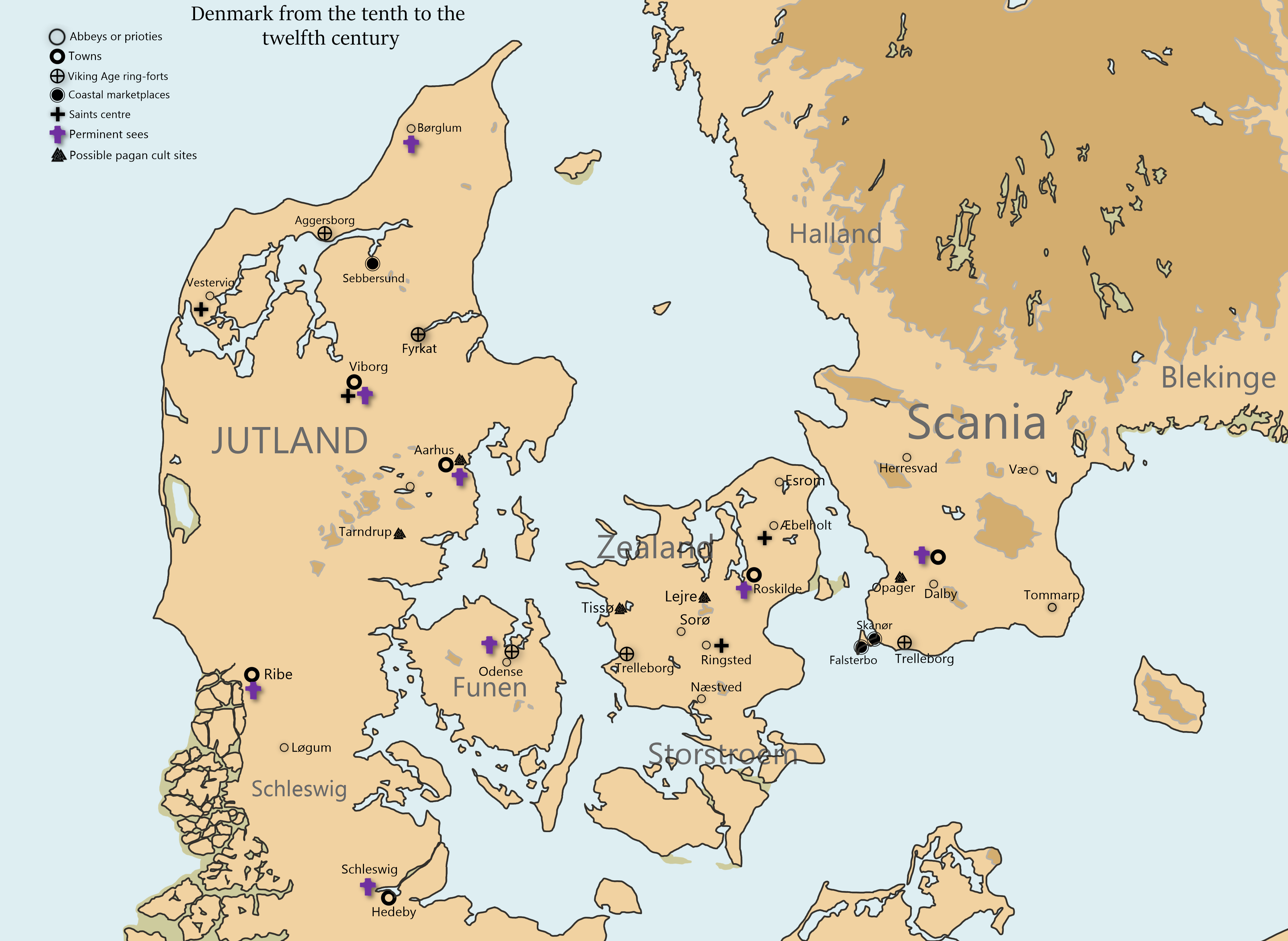
Ecclesiastical map of Denmark from the tenth to twelfth century

In May 1085, Canute wrote a letter of donation to Lund Cathedral, which was under construction, granting it large tracts of land in Scania, Zealand, and Amager. He founded Lund Cathedral School at the same time. Canute had gathered the land largely as pay for the pardon of outlawed subjects. The clerics at Lund got extended prerogatives of the land, being able to tax and fine the peasantry there. However, Canute kept his universal royal rights to pardon the outlaws, impose fines on subjects who failed to answer his leding call to war, and demand transportation for his retinue.

His reign was marked by vigorous attempts to increase royal power in Denmark, by stifling the nobles and keeping them to the word of the law. Canute issued edicts arrogating to himself the ownership of common land, the right to the goods from shipwrecks, and the right to inherit the possessions of foreigners and kinless folk. He also issued laws to protect freed thralls as well as foreign clerics and merchants. These policies led to discontent among his subjects, who were unaccustomed to a king claiming such powers and interfering in their daily lives.

=== Planned attempt on England ===
However, Canute's ambitions were not purely domestic. As the grandnephew of Canute the Great, who had ruled England, Denmark and Norway until 1035, Canute considered the crown of England to be rightfully his and regarded William the Conqueror as a usurper. In 1085, with the support of his father-in-law, Count Robert, and Olaf III of Norway, Canute planned an invasion of England and called his fleet in leding at the Limfjord. The fleet never set sail, as Canute was preoccupied in Schleswig by the potential threat of Henry IV, Holy Roman Emperor with whom both Denmark and Flanders were on unfriendly terms. Canute feared an invasion by Henry, whose enemy Hermann of Salm had sought refuge in Denmark.

The warriors of the fleet, mostly made up of peasants who needed to be home for the harvest season, got weary of waiting and elected Canute's brother Olaf (the later Olaf I of Denmark) to argue their case. That raised the suspicion of Canute, who had Olaf arrested and sent to Flanders. The leding was eventually dispersed, and the peasants tended to their harvests.

=== Death ===
Before the fleet could reassemble, a peasant revolt broke out in Vendsyssel, where Canute was staying, in early 1086. Canute first fled to Schleswig and eventually to Odense. On 10 July 1086, Canute and his men took refuge inside the wooden St. Alban's Priory, in Odense. The rebels stormed into the church and slew Canute, along with his brother Benedict and seventeen of their followers, before the altar. According to the chronicler Ælnoth of Canterbury, Canute died following a lance thrust in the flank. He was succeeded by Olaf as Olaf I of Denmark.

== Canonization ==
Because of his martyrdom and advocacy of the Church, Canute quickly began to be considered a saint. Under the reign of Olaf, Denmark suffered from crop failure, which was seen as divine retribution for the sacrilegious killing of Canute. Miracles were soon reported as taking place at his grave, and his canonization was already being sought during the reign of Olaf.

On 19 April 1101, persuaded by the envoys from Eric I of Denmark, Pope Paschal II confirmed the "cult of Canute" that had arisen, and King Canute IV was canonized. He was the first Dane to be canonized. 10 July is recognised by the Catholic Church as his feast day. In Sweden and Finland he is historically, however, partially associated with St. Knut's Day, which in reality was celebrated in the memory of the death of his nephew, Canute Lavard.

In 1300, his remains and those of his brother Benedict were interred in Saint Canute's Cathedral, built in his honour, where his remains are on display.

== Cult ==
Canute was viewed as a martyr following his death and there were reports of miracles received through his intercession. Many people who made pilgrimages to his tomb in Odense were cured of illnesses and maladies. As such his cult spread throughout Denmark. The English monk Aelnoth of Canterbury wrote his biography which helped spread devotion to him in England. The Benedictine monastery at Odense served as the cult centre for Canute. During the 1120s or 1130s devotion to the martyred king reached its pinnacle in Denmark. Among the evidence for the saints cult in Denmark he was depicted in Næstved Church with a beautiful statue and a screen with images illustrating his life, dating to the 15th century.

== Legacy ==
The reign of Canute has been interpreted differently through the times; from a violent king who tyrannized his subjects, to a strict but fair ruler who devotedly supported the Roman Catholic Church and fought for justice without regard to his own person. He was never a thoroughly popular saint in Denmark, but his sainthood granted the Danish monarchy an aura of divine legitimacy. The cause of the rebellion which killed Canute is unknown, but has been speculated as originating in fines issued to the peasants breaking the leding of 1085 as specified in the Chronicon Roskildense, or as a result of his vigorous tithe policy.

The document of his donation to Lund Cathedral was the oldest comprehensive text from Denmark, and provided broad insights into Danish post-Viking Age society. The donation might have had the aim of establishing the Danish Archdiocese of Lund according to Sweyn II Estridsson's wishes, which was finally achieved in 1104. Canute's son Carl became Count of Flanders from 1119 to 1127, ruling as Charles the Good. Like his father, Charles was slain in a church by rebels (in Bruges, 1127), and later beatified by the Catholic church. According to Niels Lund, Lecturer in Medieval History at the University of Copenhagen, Canute's abortive invasion of England "marked the end of the Viking Age."

In 2008, an X-ray computed tomography was taken of Canute, which showed that he was right-handed and of a slender build. It also specified his cause of death as a thrust to the sacrum through the abdomen, negating Ælnoth's account. He had no injuries indicating he fought against multiple enemies, which can be seen as supporting an account saying he faced his death without a struggle.

== Popular culture ==
In parts of Spain, Canute's feast day has reportedly become a tongue-in-cheek "holiday" for the marijuana legalization movement, appropriating the Spanish version of his name, Canuto, which coincidentally is also the word for a marijuana cigarette.

== See also ==
- List of Catholic saints
- List of Danish monarchs

Canute the Saint House of Estridsen Born: c. 1042 Died: July 10 1086
Regnal titles
Preceded by Harald III	King of Denmark; 1080–1086	Succeeded by Olaf I
