= Renaissance High School =

Renaissance High School may refer to:

- Renaissance High School, in Santa Cruz County, California
- Renaissance High School (Idaho), in Meridian
- Renaissance High School (Michigan), in Detroit
- Renaissance High School (Tennessee), in the Williamson County Schools district
