= Adela of Flanders =

Queen of Denmark from 1080 to 1086

Queen consort of Denmark
- Tenure: 1080–1086

Duchess consort of Apulia
- Tenure: 1092–1111
- Born: c. 1064
- Died: April 1115
- Spouses: Canute IV of Denmark; Roger Borsa
- Issue: Charles the Good; Cecilia Knutsdatter of Denmark; Ingegerd Knutsdatter of Denmark; Louis of Apulia; William II, Duke of Apulia; Guiscard of Apulia
- House: Flanders
- Father: Robert I, Count of Flanders
- Mother: Gertrude of Saxony

Adela of Flanders (Ala and Alana in southern Italian sources; c. 1064 – April 1115), was Queen consort of Denmark by marriage to King Canute IV and duchess of Apulia by marriage to Duke Roger Borsa, and then regent of Apulia from 1111 to 1115 as mother and guardian of Duke William II of Apulia.

== Life ==
Adela was born the daughter of Robert I, Count of Flanders, and Gertrude of Saxony. In 1080, she married King Canute IV of Denmark. The marriage was arranged as a part of an alliance between Flanders and Denmark against William the Conqueror. During this marriage, she had three children: a son, later Count Charles the Good (born in 1084), and twin daughters, Cecilia and Ingegerd (born ca. 1085/86). When Canute was assassinated in 1086, she fled with her son to Flanders, leaving her daughters behind in Denmark.

She stayed in the court of her father and brother Robert II until 1092, when she left for Italy to marry Roger Borsa, Duke of Apulia. She bore her second husband three sons: Louis (who died in infancy in 1094), the future Duke William II (born ca. 1096/97) and Guiscard (who died in boyhood in 1108). She acted as a regent for her son William II at the death of Roger Borsa from 1111 until he came of age in 1114.

== Sources ==
- Galbert of Bruges (2013). The Murder, Betrayal, and Slaughter of the Glorious Charles, Count of Flanders. Translated by Rider, Jeff. Yale University Press.
- Houben, Hubert (2002). Roger II of Sicily: A Ruler Between East and West. Cambridge University Press.
- Brandenburg, E. (1998). Die Nachkommen Karls des Großen (in German). Neustadt an der Aisch.

Adela of Flanders House of Flanders Born: circa 1064 Died: April 1115
Preceded by Margareta Hasbjörnsdatter	Queen consort of Denmark; 1080–1086	Succeeded by Ingegerd of Norway
