= Bjørn Svendsen =

Bjørn Svendsen (c. 1062 – 1100 Rendsburg) was one of the many illegitimate sons of King Sweyn II of Denmark. Unfortunately for him he was one of the younger ones of these sons which put him far down the list of inheriting the throne of Denmark. Bjørn was appointed to various positions of power throughout his older brothers' reigns, and he never caused any trouble being content with what he had. In 1099 at the age of about 37 he was appointed to the very powerful position of Jarl of Nordalbingien. He made fortifications on the island where the town of Rendsburg is situated. He was killed (with a lance) while presiding a thing the following year by a farmer or nobleman who was upset by the rule of Bjørn. His distant cousin Hakon Sunnivasson eventually avenged Bjørn's murder and became a trusted Jarl of Bjørn's brother King Eric I of Denmark.

Bjørn had no known children.

Bjørn's great-great-grandfather was also named Bjørn.
