= Retired husband syndrome =

Psychosomatic stress-related illness of older females recognized in Japanese culture

Retired husband syndrome (主人在宅ストレス症候群, shujin zaitaku sutoresu shōkōgun; literally "one's husband being at home stress syndrome") (RHS) is a psychosomatic stress-related illness recognized in Japanese culture which has been estimated to occur in 60% of the older female population. It is claimed to be a condition where a woman begins to exhibit signs of physical illness and depression as her husband reaches, or approaches, retirement.

== Common symptoms ==
The following are some of the common symptoms of RHS:

- Depression
- Skin rash
- Asthma
- Ulcers
- High blood pressure

== Theorized reason for RHS ==
This syndrome was identified and coined by Nobuo Kurokawa and first appeared in a presentation of his to the Japanese Society of Psychosomatic Medicine in 1991.

Kurokawa has theorized that RHS is a result of the fact that many of Japan's citizens who are reaching retirement age, 60, are members of the Baby Boomer generation of Japan. The members of this generation were expected to meet certain social requirements: that the man should be the breadwinner and work to support his family, and the woman was to be not only a homemaker but also to show a level of adoration for her salaryman husband as reward for his bringing in the money she used to look after their children and socialize with her friends.

As the husband's career as a salaryman can demand long hours away from home, both working and socializing with other salarymen and their bosses as is expected, a husband may leave home in the early hours of the morning and return home late at night. This could mean that a husband and wife may not interact extensively and when a husband retires both members of the couple can feel they are living together with someone who is a virtual stranger.

This can be a particularly stressful experience for the woman who, as society dictated in her youth, is expected to attend to her husband's every need and can find this a very large demand indeed. The stress this change in life style brings can lead not only to the above listed symptoms, but also to a level of resentment felt toward her husband. Some couples have been known to separate over RHS, however divorce is uncommon as it is not considered an acceptable option for that generation of Japanese. Also currently an ex-wife has no rights to a portion of her husband's pension should they divorce, and therefore may be unable to survive financially (though this was set to change in 2007). Despite this, the divorce rate among older Japanese couples has soared in recent decades, as more of the baby boomer population have retired, increasing by 26.5% in 10 years according to the health ministry. The number of divorces among couples married for 20 years or more hit 42,000 in 2004, double those recorded in 1985. Divorces among those married for more than 30 years quadrupled during the same period. In 2006, these figures were projected to rise further as more Japanese people were expected to retire in the subsequent five years than at any other point in Japanese history.

Some women deal with RHS by focusing their energy on obsessions such as collecting teddy bears, or following a celebrity, which they say can help them psychologically. They may also ask their husbands to stay on at work past retirement age. Many wives do not tell their husbands what is happening and this can worsen the stress as their husbands may not understand or even realize their wives have RHS.

== Research ==
Marco Bertoni and Giorgio Brunello of the University of Padova published a discussion paper in July 2014 based on empirical research in Japan.

== See also ==
- Grey divorce
