= Harald Hen =

King of Denmark from 1076 to 1080

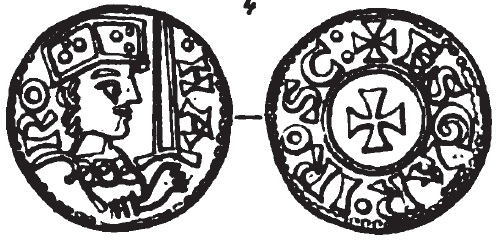
- Coin of Harald Hen

King of Denmark
- Reign: 1076–1080
- Predecessor: Sweyn II Estridsson
- Successor: Canute IV the Saint
- Born: c. 1040
- Died: 17 April 1080 (aged 39–40)
- Burial: Dalby Church, Scania
- Spouse: Margareta Hasbjörnsdatter
Names
- Harald Svendsen
- House: Estridsen
- Father: Sweyn II Estridsson

Harald Hen (Runic Danish for Harald the Whetstone; c. 1040 – 17 April 1080) was King of Denmark from 1076 to 1080. Harald III was an illegitimate son of Danish king Sweyn II Estridsson, and contested the crown with some of his brothers. He was a peaceful ruler who initiated a number of reforms. Harald was married to his cousin Margareta Hasbjörnsdatter, but did not leave any heirs, and was succeeded by his brother Canute IV the Saint. Four of his half-brothers were in turn crowned Danish kings.

== Biography ==
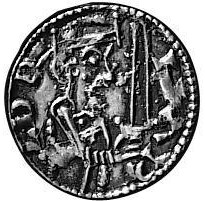
Coin of Harald III

Harald was born around 1040. Son of King Sweyn II, Harald took part in Sweyn's 1069 raid of England alongside his uncle Jarl Asbjørn and his brother Canute.

After the death of his father in 1076, Harald was elected king in competition with his younger brother, Canute, at an assembly at Isøre near Odsherred. In order to get elected, he took the vows called Harald's laws, declaring his will to uphold the existing rule of law. During his rule, Harald met opposition from a number of his brothers, likely including Canute, who enlisted the support of Olaf III of Norway. Pope Gregory VII mediated, advising Olaf not to take sides, and for Harald to share power with his brothers.

Harald was dependent on the great nobles of Denmark for his election, and did little to oppose them. As a result, he fought no major wars and spent his energy improving the few things that lay in his purview. He is best known for improving and standardizing Danish coinage, and established mints at Ribe, Viborg, Lund, and Schleswig. He instituted public use of the Royal forests. Harald also sought to change Danish legal customs. Harald deplored the ancient customs of trial by combat and the jernbyrd trial by ordeal of holding red-hot iron bars, and introduced a system used by the English of calling upon honorable men to swear oaths on behalf of the parties in a trial. He allegedly continued Sweyn's policy of requesting the Pope to grant a Danish Archbishopric, but was not successful.

Harald died on 17 April 1080, and was interred at Dalby Church in Scania. He was succeeded as king by his brother, Canute IV.

== Legacy ==
Saxo Grammaticus scorned Harald as a weak and ineffective king yielding to the will of the common people, while Ælnoth called him a "by the people beloved lawmaker". He is also described as a man who let others control his actions, possessing a mild temper. Perhaps this gives the explanation for his nickname Harald the Whetstone (Danish: Harald Hen or Hein), in other words, Harald the Soft.

The legal reforms of Harald were not fully accepted until the reign of Valdemar II the Victorious in the 13th century. The historicity of his coinage reform has also been called into question.

Harald III House of Estridsen Born: 1040 Died: April 17 1080
Regnal titles
Preceded by Sweyn Estridsson	King of Denmark; 1076–1080	Succeeded by Canute the Saint
