= William of Roskilde =

Bishop of the Diocese of Roskilde

William
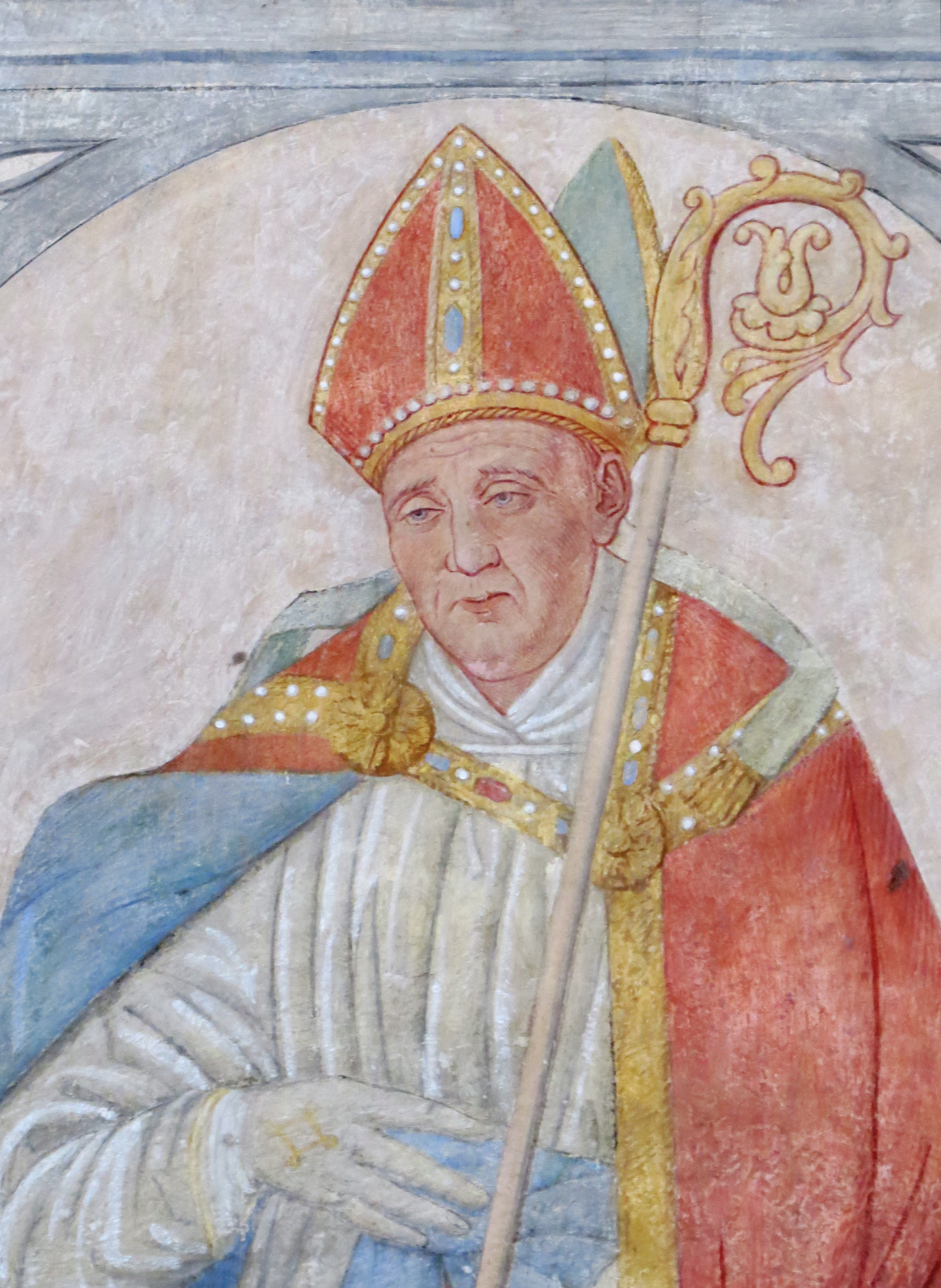

Bishop
- Died: 10 May 1074
- Venerated in: Roman Catholic Church
- Feast: 2 September

William of Roskilde (Danish: Vilhelm, German: Wilhelm, Latin: Wilhelmus; died 8 May or 10 May c. 1074) was a Danish prelate of the Roman Catholic Church who served as the Bishop of Roskilde in Denmark from about 1060.

== Origin ==
Nothing is known about William's early life. A contemporary historian, Adam von Bremen, recounts him as a cleric serving Archbishop Adalbert of Bremen before becoming bishop of Roskilde, which suggests a German descent. While the Gesta Danorum by Saxo Grammaticus written a century later frames him as Anglo-Saxon who previously served Cnut the Great in England as his priest and clerk.

== Bishop of Roskilde ==
The sources around William's tenure as bishop are scarce. He is attributed with initiating the construction of Roskilde Cathedral that his successor completed in around 1080.

According to Saxo Grammaticus, William had a close relationship with King Sweyn II that allowed him to secure valuable land and power for his bishopric. He also retells an appropriated fictional story based on a legend with Saint Ambrose and Theodosius I originally written by Paulinus the Deacon about murder and penitence to explain their relationship development.

=== Death ===
William's death is commonly recorded on either 8 May or 10 May and around year 1074 because evidence suggest that he died before King Sweyn II (Note: He died 28 April 1076.) as the king selected his successor after he had passed. William's remains were buried in Roskilde Cathedral.

== Sainthood ==
William of Roskilde's date of canonization is unknown, (Note: See talk page for discussion if it ever took place.) but his memorial is observed by the Roman Catholic Church on September 2. (Note: These sources incorrectly state that William of Roskilde died in 1067 and King Sweyn before him without source.)

== See also ==
- Roman Catholic Diocese of Roskilde

== Citations ==
Catholic Church titles
Preceded by Avaco	Bishop of Roskilde c. 1060 – c. 1074	Succeeded by Svend Nordmand
