= Kinlessness =

Kinlessness is the state of having no family members. This is often defined as an adult, especially an older adult, who has no spouse or children. It may be defined in other ways, including having no known relatives at all, or having no first-degree relatives (no surviving parents, spouse, siblings, or children). People who are kinless may call themselves elder orphans or solo agers.

== Prevalence and causes ==
The number of kinless people depends on the definition chosen and the family structures common in their culture. A society in which families have many children will have fewer kinless adults than a society with small families. The grey divorce phenomenon can result in older adults unexpectedly becoming kinless.

In the US, about 1 in 16 adults over the age of 55 have neither living biological children nor a legally recognized spouse. About 1% of Americans over age 55 have no living spouse, children, or siblings. About 3% of American women over the age of 75 have no spouse, children, or siblings. Black people in the US are at particularly high risk of being kinless in old age. These numbers are expected to increase.

Even when an older adult is not technically kinless, they may be unable to receive any care from family members, due to the surviving family member living too far away, a family estrangement, or the other family member being too disabled to provide care.

== Consequences ==
Kinless adults tend to die slightly younger than adults living in a family setting. They receive less physical care as they become disabled, and they are more likely to die in a nursing home.

Some effects can be mitigated by building a family of choice, which can prevent social isolation and loneliness, and accessing various types of social services, such as meal delivery services. However, these tend to be limited to neighborly activities or services, such as running an errand, rather than helping a disabled person with intimate personal needs, such as toileting and bathing.

Stepchildren may or may not be counted as the kin of an aging stepparent, so some people may be considered kinless even though they have a stepchild, and others might not be.

== See also ==
- Only child – children from small families have a higher risk of kinlessness
- Long-term care insurance – a strategy to pay for personal care
- Kodokushi – dying alone, without anyone discovering it for a long time
