= Thomas Heebøll-Holm =

Danish historian

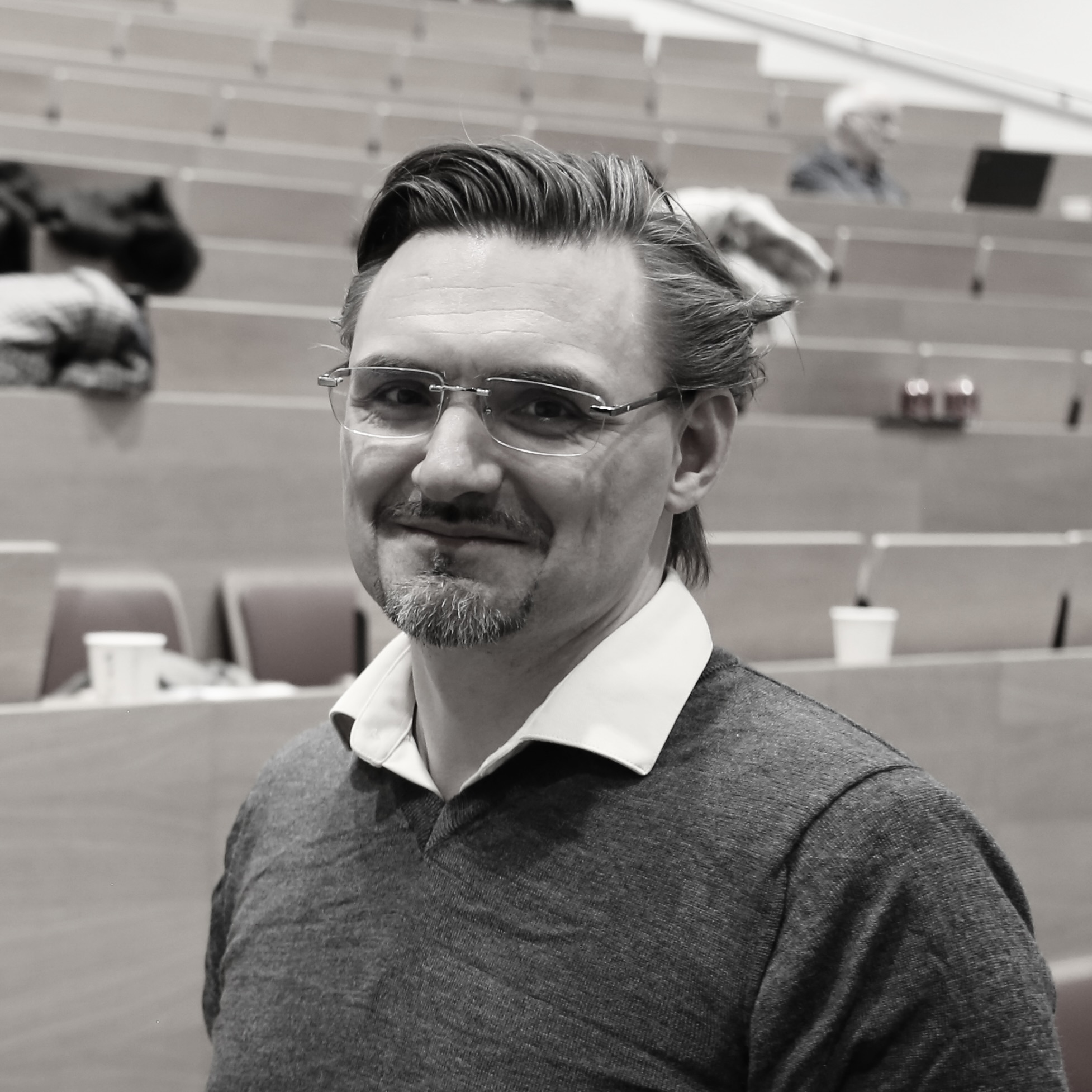
The Danish historian Thomas Heebøll-Holm at a Symposium on Saints in Odense, Denmark, 2025

Thomas Kristian Heebøll-Holm is a Danish medieval historian at the Department of Culture and Language at the University of Southern Denmark.

Heebøll-Holm is most known for his work on medieval piracy. In particular, he has argued that early Danish kings relied in part on piracy to build their political and financial strength. From 2024 and onwards Heebøll-Holm heads the research project Fama in Medieval Denmark (c. 1240-1340): Rumors, Reputation and Public Opinion.

Heebøll-Holm also hosts the two podcasts; Mægtige Middelalder (in Danish) and The Fama Podcast(in English).

== Early life and education ==
Heebøll-Holm was born in 1978 . He attended The University of Copenhagen from 1999, where he achieved a mag.art.- degree in history in 2007.

== Career ==
In 2011 Heebøll-Holm was awarded a Ph.D. from the University of Copenhagen for his doctoral thesis on medieval Anglo-French privacy. The thesis was published in 2013 as Ports, Piracy and Maritime War. Piracy in the English Channel and the Atlantic, c.1280- c. 1330 with Brill.

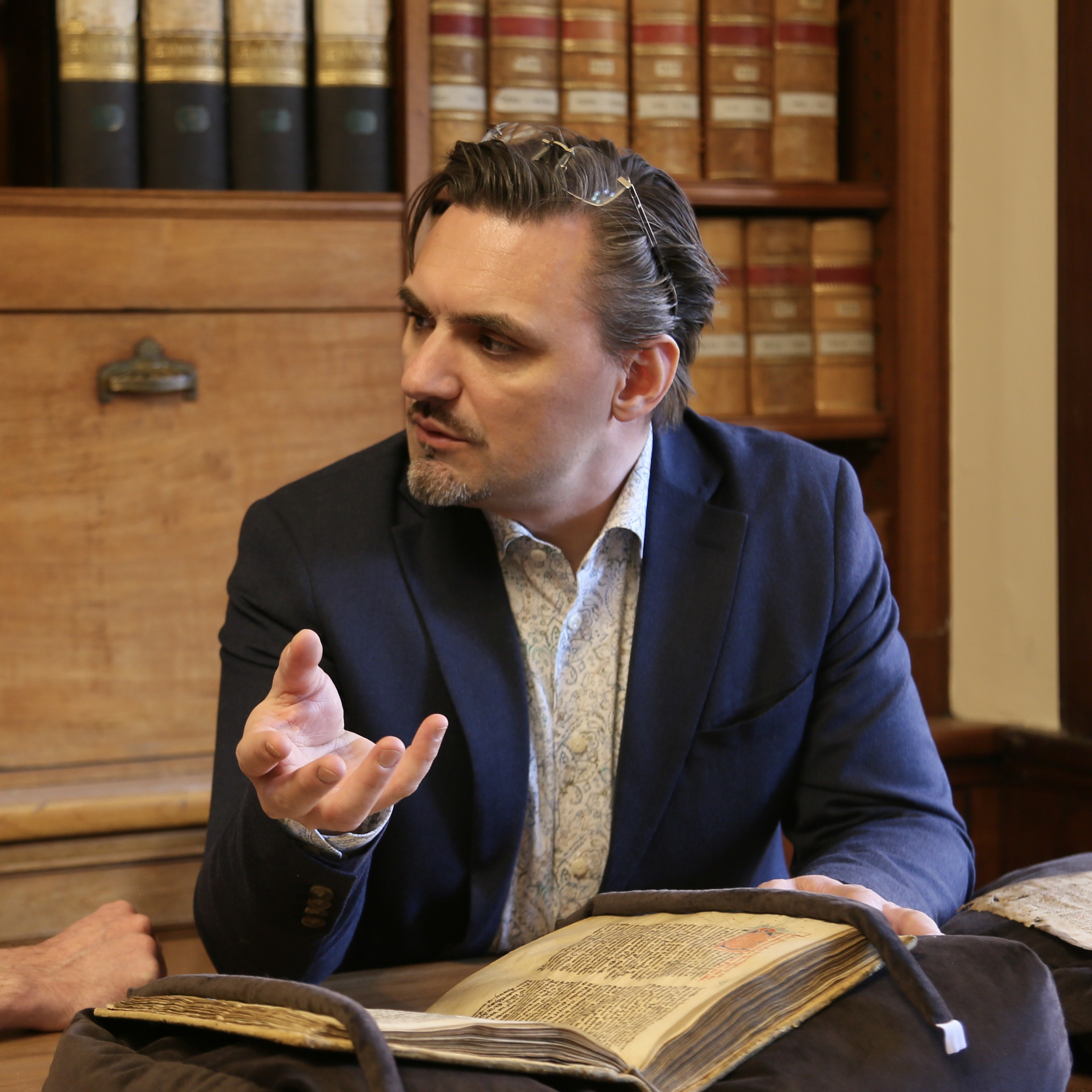
Danish historian Thomas Heebøll-Holm sitting down with a medieval chronicle in an office at the Danish Royal Library

From 2012 to 2015 he worked as a post.doc at the Saxo-Institute at The University of Copenhagen. Here he was attached to the project Danish Historical Writing before 1225 and its Intellectual Context in Medieval Europe. Heebøll-Holm has since continued his professional interest and involvement in this field, and published in 2024 A Companion to Saxo Grammaticus together with professor Lars Boje Mortensen.

In 2015 Heebøll-Holm was hired as an assistant professor at the Institute of History at the University of Southern Denmark, and in 2018 he was appointed to the position of associate professor at the same institution.

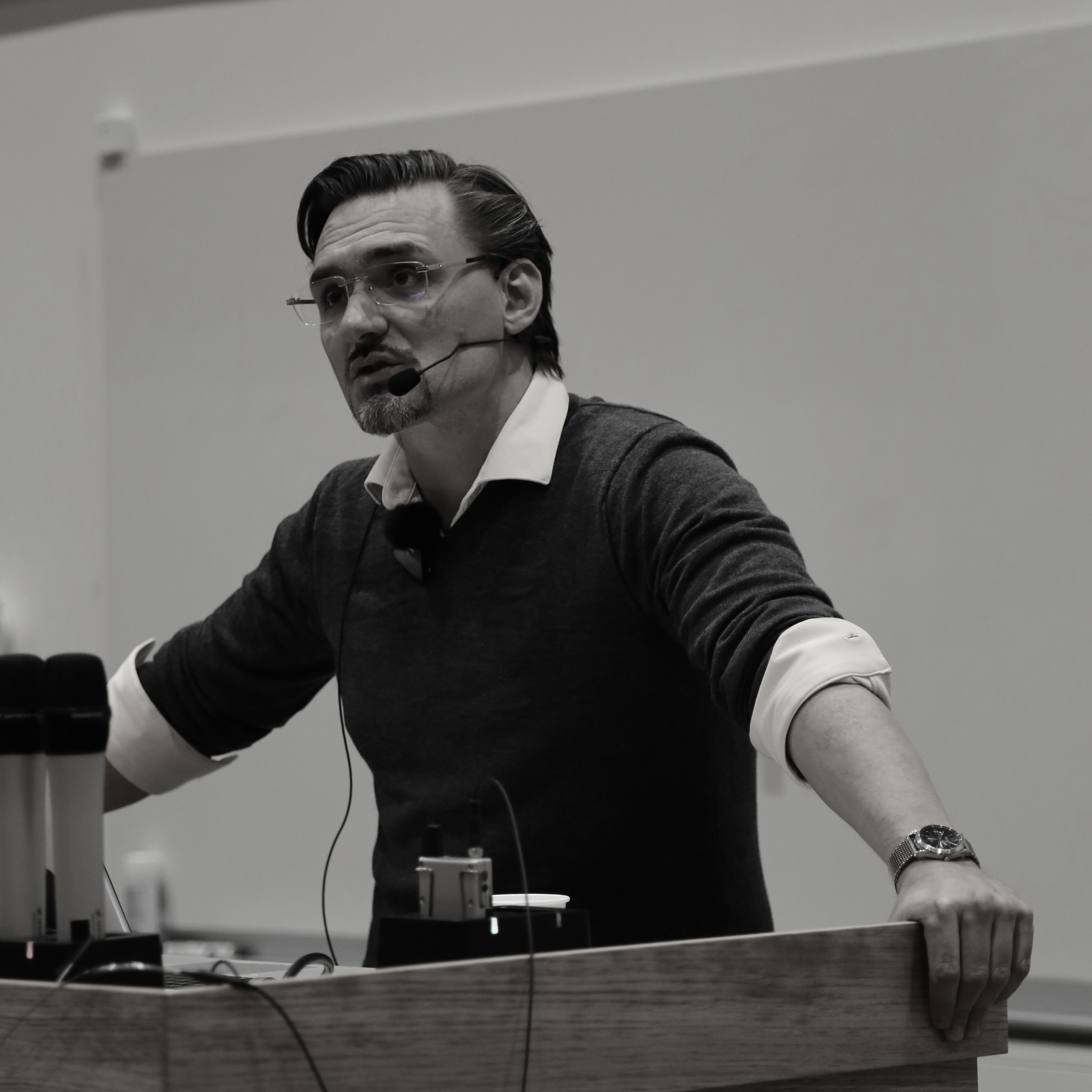
Thomas Heebøll-Holm lecturing, 2025

In 2021 he launched Mægtige Middelalder, a Danish-language podcast, where Heebøll-Holm, in collaboration with a variety of other researchers, disseminates top of the line research and knowledge on medieval history to a broader audience.

From 2024 and onwards Heebøll-Holm heads the research project Fama in Medieval Denmark (c. 1240-1340): Rumors, Reputation and Public Opinion. Through examining how fama shaped Danish politics and jurisprudence, this project offers fresh insights into the evolution of public opinion and social structures in medieval Danish society. As part of the project Heebøll-holm launched the English-language podcast; The Fama Podcast, in the spring of 2025.

Heebøll-Holm is also known for his research involving medieval knights and the possibility that they suffered from Post-traumatic stress disorder and other hardships.
