= Ælnoth of Canterbury =

English monk

Ælnoth or Ailnoth was an Anglo-Saxon Benedictine monk from Canterbury who settled in Denmark, and is known as author of a legend of the Danish king Saint Canute (Canute IV), who had been killed in Odense in 1086 and was canonized by the Pope 1100 or 1101.

== Life ==
Ælnoth may have been prior in the Benedictine community founded in Odense as a daughter house of the Abbey at Evesham. According to the Danish historian Hans Olrik, who wrote the biography of Ælnoth in the first edition of the Danish biographical reference work Dansk biografisk lexikon, Ælnoth came to Denmark and Odense about 1100; he there had compatriots called in earlier by King Eric for the new cathedral planned as the burial church for the slain King Canute, his older brother (in other words at some point after the death of Canute in 1086). However, it has also been suggested that he came as early as 1085, accompanying relics of Saint Alban.

Other than his origins in Canterbury, little is known about the life of Ælnoth, with even the dates of his arrival in Denmark and when he wrote the 'Life and Passion of St Canute' being uncertain. There are hints at persecution from which Ælnoth considered himself the object, possibly from a priest higher up in the hierarchy. According to Olrik, Ælnoth shows familiarity with Denmark and Danish customs, but little sympathy for the Danes, and appears to hate the Normans who had caused him to leave his own country.

== Work ==
When he had been in Denmark 24 years (perhaps between 1109 and 1122, depending on the date he can be assumed to have arrived in Denmark), he wrote his Latin Vita et Passio S. Canuti (English: Life and Passion of St Canute). Olrik calls it "one of the most important sources for the history of Denmark in the Middle Ages". According to Olrik, Ælnoth is unusually frank as he, despite his awe of his hero, nevertheless hints at the faults of the violent king. He switches between prose and poetry in a way Olrik defines as typically Anglo-Saxon. The legend is dedicated to King Niels, and is more generally written with the political purpose of supporting the claims of the dynasty of the sons of Sweyn Estridson.

Early printed editions of Ælnoth's Life of Saint Canute include Historia S. Canuti Regis et Martyris, Othoniæ sepulti, printed in Copenhagen 1602. A more recent edition is Gesta Swenomagni regis et filiorum eius passio gloriasissimi Canuti regis et martyris, in Martin Clarentius Gertz, ed., Vitae sanctorum Danorum (Copenhagen 1908-12), p. 77-136. A recent Danish translation is Ælnoths Krønike, translated by Erling Albrectsen (Odense: Odense Universitetsforlag, 1984). A "rough and partial" English translation of the work was made available by Laura Gazzoli in 2020.
