= Sweyn II of Denmark =

King of Denmark from 1047 to 1076

Sweyn II
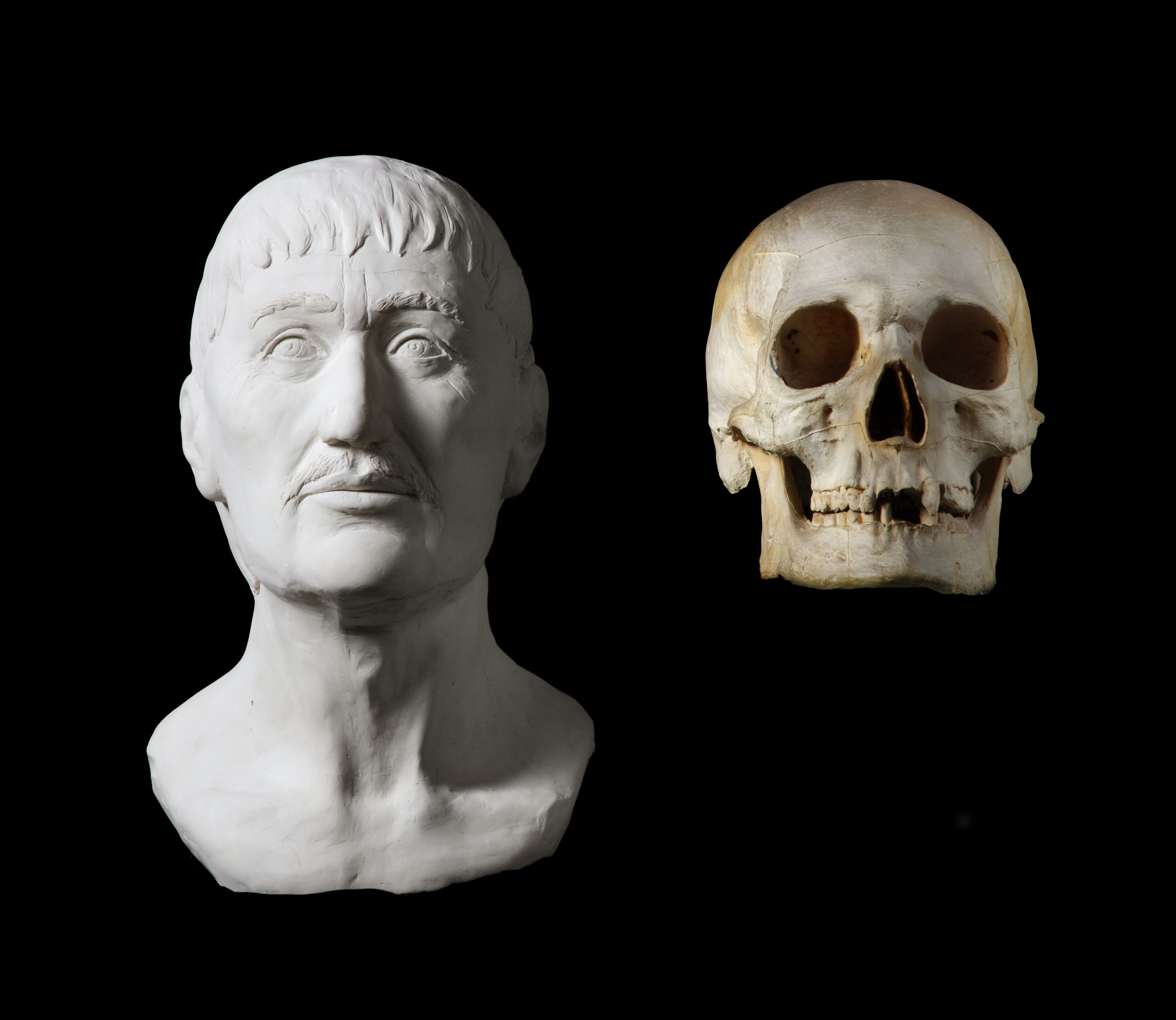
- Reconstruction of Sweyn Estridsson's head based on the skull

King of Denmark
- Reign: 1047–1076
- Predecessor: Magnus the Good
- Successor: Harald III the Whetstone
- Born: c. 1019; England
- Died: 28 April 1076; Søderup, Hjordkær Parish, Denmark
- Burial: Roskilde Cathedral
- Spouses: Gyda of Sweden; Gunnhildr Sveinsdóttir; Tora Torbergsdatter (disputed)
- Issue among others...: Harald Hen; Canute the Saint; Olaf Hunger; Eric Evergood; Niels, King of Denmark; Ingerid, Queen of Norway; Sweyn the Crusader; Svend Tronkræver; Sigrid Svendsdatter
Names
- Sweyn Estridsson; Sweyn Ulfsson
- House: Estridsen
- Father: Ulf Thorgilsson
- Mother: Estrid Svendsdatter

Sweyn II (c. 1019 – 28 April 1076), also known as Sweyn Estridsson (Note: His first name is also spelled Swen, Swein, Svein and Sven, and the matronymic as Estridson, Estrithson or Estridsøn.) (Old Norse: Sveinn Ástríðarson, Danish: Svend Estridsen) and Sweyn Ulfsson, was King of Denmark from 1047 until his death in 1076. He was the son of Ulf Thorgilsson and Estrid Svendsdatter, and the grandson of Sweyn Forkbeard through his mother's line. He was married at least twice, and fathered 20 children or more out of wedlock, including the five future kings Harald Hen, Saint Canute, Oluf Hunger, Eric Evergood, and Niels.

He was courageous in battle, but did not have much success as a military commander. His skeleton reveals that he was a tall, powerfully built man who walked with a limp.

== Biography ==
=== Accession to the throne ===
Sweyn was born in England, as the son of Ulf Thorgilsson and Estrid Svendsdatter, the daughter of King Sweyn I Forkbeard and sister of Kings Harald II and Canute the Great. Sweyn grew up a military leader, and served under King Anund Jacob of Sweden for a time. He pillaged the Elbe-Weser area in 1040, but was caught by the Archbishop of Hamburg-Bremen, who released him shortly thereafter.

The Danish king Harthacnut, Sweyn's cousin, made him a jarl, and Sweyn led a campaign for him against Norway, but King Magnus I of Norway defeated them. When Harthacnut died in 1042, Magnus claimed the Danish throne and made Svend the jarl of Jutland. In 1043, Sweyn fought for Magnus at the Battle of Lyrskov Heath at Hedeby, near the present-day border of Denmark and Germany. Sweyn won a great reputation at Lyrskov Heath, and had the Danish nobles crown him king in Viborg in Jutland. He was defeated by Magnus on several occasions, and had to flee to Sweden. Eventually he managed to return and establish a foothold in Scania.

The war between Magnus and Sweyn lasted until 1045, when Magnus' uncle Harald Hardrada returned to Norway from exile. Harald and Sweyn joined forces, and Magnus decided to share the Norwegian throne with Harald. In 1047 Magnus died, having stated on his deathbed that his kingdom would be divided: Harald would get the throne of Norway, while Sweyn would be king of Denmark. Upon hearing of Magnus' death Sweyn said, "Now so help me God, I shall never yield Denmark".

=== Feud with Harald Hardrada ===
Harald, unwilling to relinquish Denmark, attacked Sweyn and fought a long war. Harald sacked Hedeby in 1050, and also sacked Aarhus. Sweyn almost captured Harald in 1050, when Harald attacked the coast of Jutland and loaded his ships with goods and captives. Sweyn's flotilla caught up with the Norwegians and Harald ordered his men to throw out the captured goods, thinking the Danes would stop to get the goods. Sweyn ordered his men to leave the goods and go after Harald. Harald then ordered his men to throw the captives overboard. For them Sweyn was willing to let Harald slip away. Sweyn came close to losing his life at the naval Battle of Niså off the coast of Halland in 1062. According to the sagas Harald urged Sweyn to meet him in a final and decisive battle at Elv in the spring of 1062. When Sweyn and the Danish army did not show up, Harald sent home a large part of his army, only keeping the more professional warriors in his fleet. When Sweyn finally came to meet Harald, his fleet numbered 300 ships to Harald's 150. The fleets met at night and the battle lasted until morning, when the Danes started to flee. In the sagas the Norwegian victory is largely credited to earl Haakon Ivarsson, who disengaged his ships from the Norwegian flanks and started attacking the weakened ships on the Danish flanks. This might be the aiding Norwegian chieftain that Saxo Grammaticus refers to, as turning the tide in Norwegian favour.

Sweyn managed to escape the battle, reached land and stopped at the house of a peasant to ask for something to eat. "What was the terrible rumbling in the night?" she asked. "Didn't you know the two kings were fighting all night?" asked one of Sweyn's men. "Who won, then?" the woman asked. "Norwegians," came the reply. "It's a shame on us, for a king we already have. He limps and is timid." "No," King Sweyn explained, "Timid the king of the Danes is assuredly not," defended another of the king's men, "but luck isn't with him and he lacks a victory." The housecarl brought the men water and a towel to wash themselves. As the king was drying his hands, the woman tore the cloth from him, "You should be ashamed of yourself for using the whole towel for yourself," she scolded. "The day will come when I will have your permission to use the whole cloth," was the king's comment. Her husband gave the king a horse, and Sweyn continued on his way to Zealand.

Some time later, the peasant was called to Zealand and given lands there for his service to the king, but his wife had to remain behind in Halland. Sweyn had a reputation for generosity and kindness that helped him on several occasions to win the trust of his people. Harald relinquished his claims to Denmark in 1064, in exchange for Sweyn's recognition of Harald as Harald III of Norway. Harald then sailed off to England to claim the crown of England and was killed there.

=== Consolidation of power ===
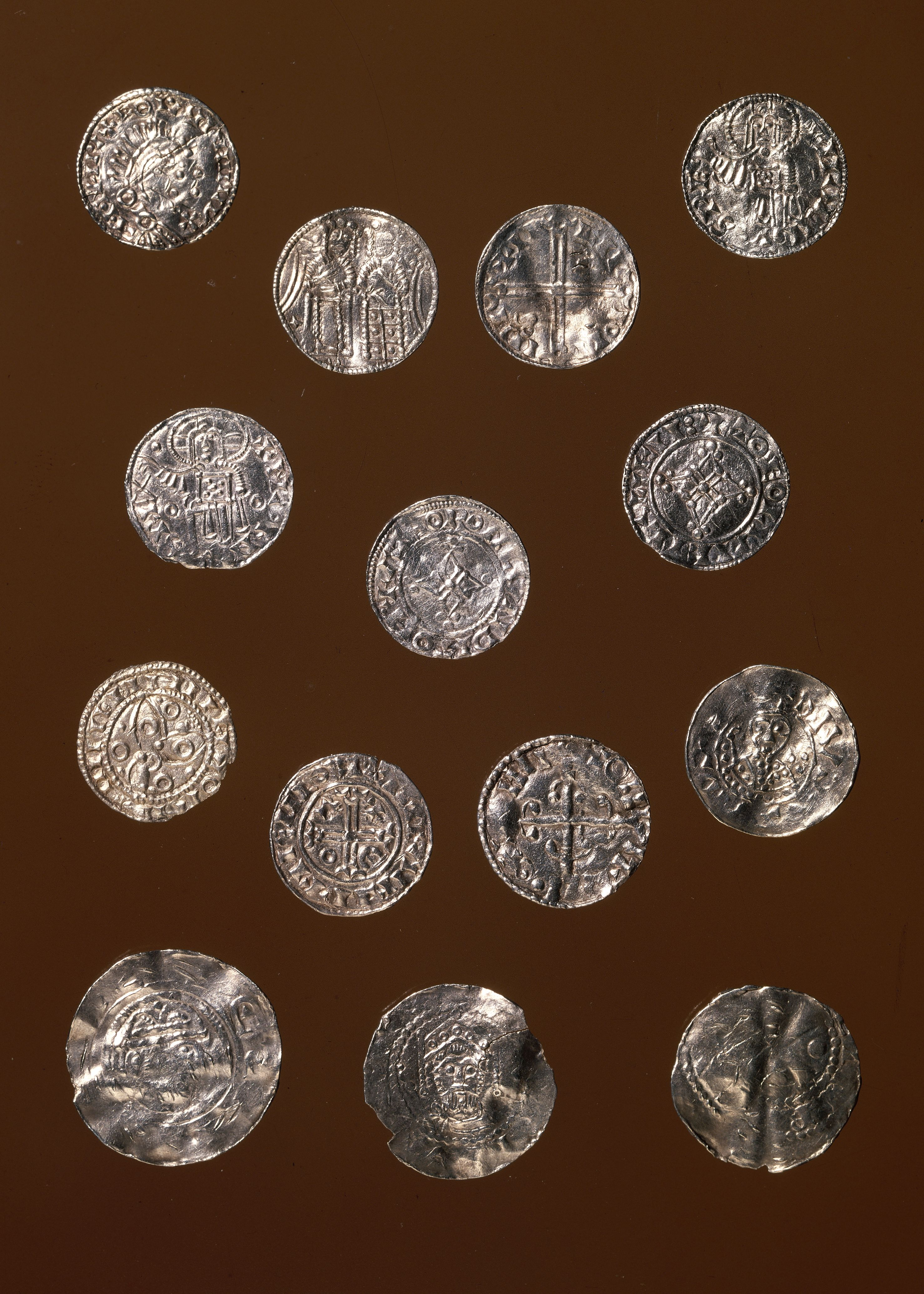
Coins minted during the reign of Sweyn II.

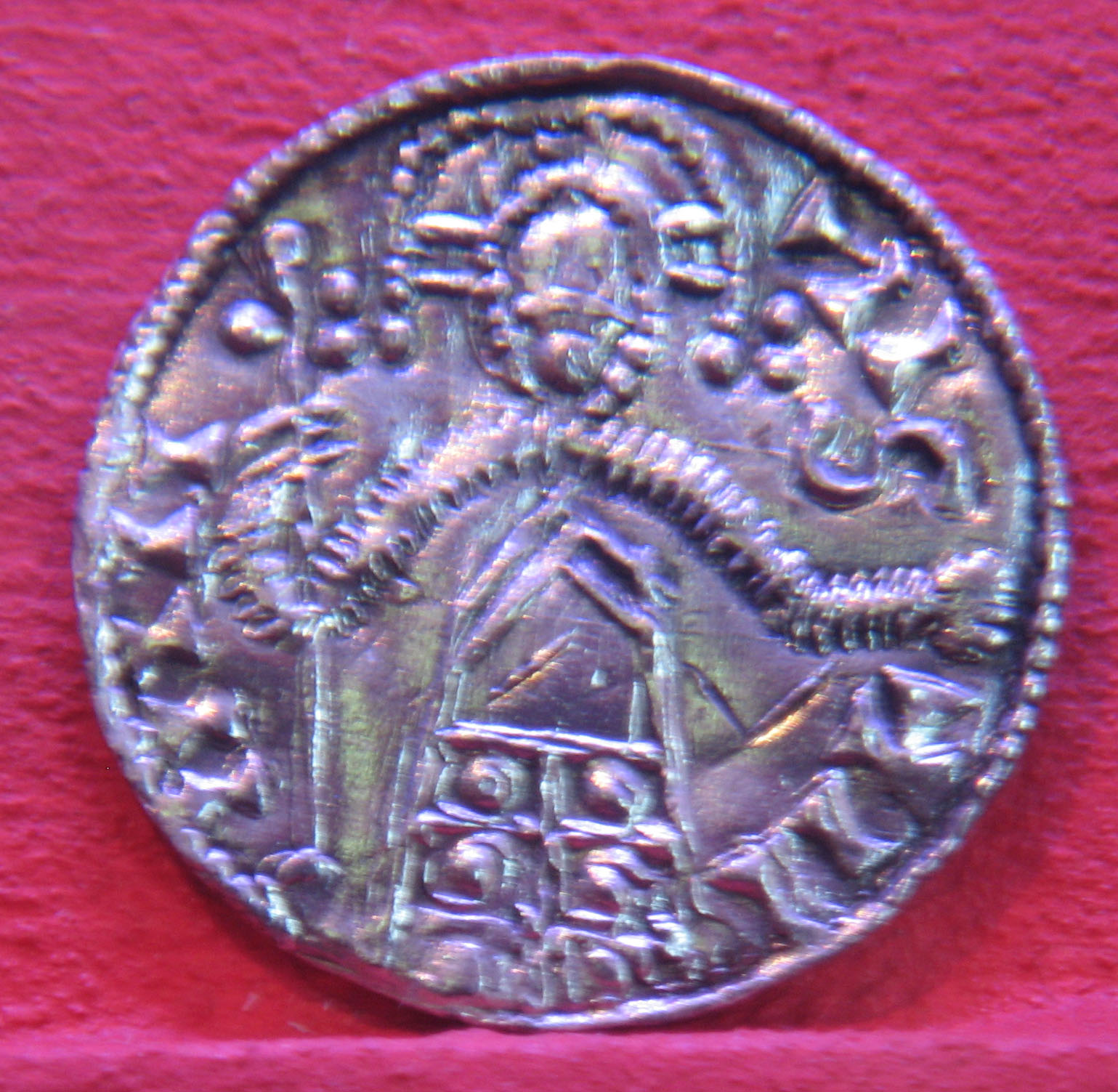
Coin of Sweyn II.

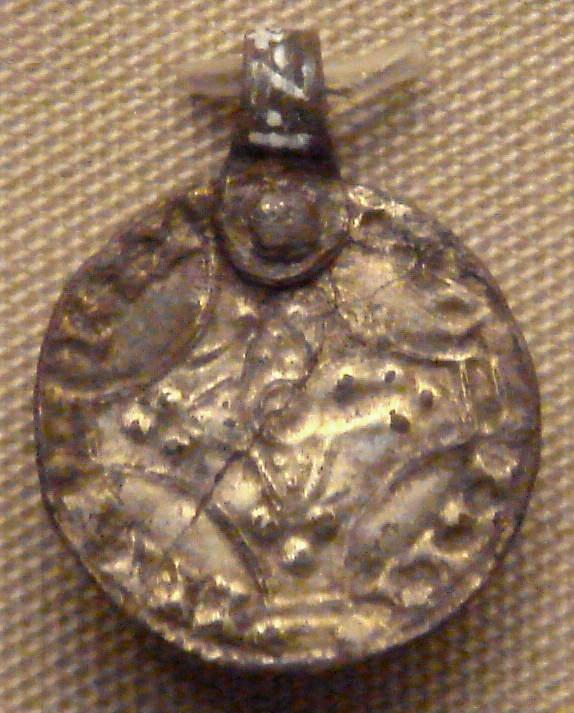
Coin pendant of Sweyn II, found in Mildenhall, Suffolk. British Museum.

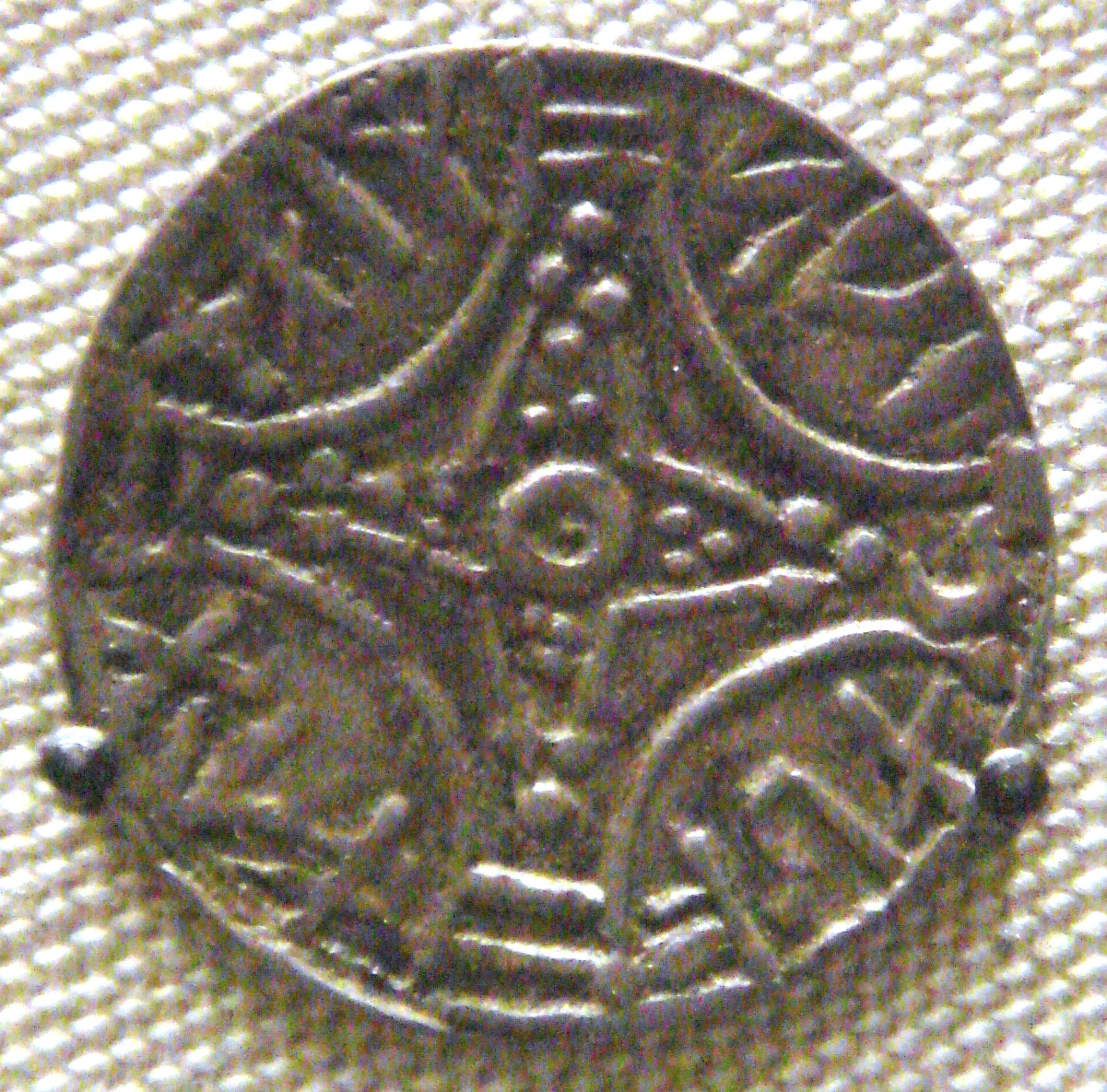
Coin of Sweyn II. British Museum.

Sweyn's connection to the Danish kings was his mother Estrid Svendsdatter, and he took the matronymic surname Estridsson after her, emphasizing his link to the Danish royal house. He also minted his own coins.

Sweyn sought to consolidate his power through links to the church as well as foreign powers, and actively sought the friendship of the popes. He wanted his eldest son Knud Magnus crowned by the Pope, but Knud died on the journey to Rome. He also unsuccessfully pressed for Harald Bluetooth, the first Christian king of Denmark, to be sanctified. He was an ally of Emperor Henry III against Count Baldwin V of Flanders in 1049, and Sweyn assisted his son-in-law Gottschalk in the Liutizi Civil War of 1057.

After Harald Hardrada was killed, and William the Conqueror had conquered England, Sweyn turned his attention to England, once ruled by his uncle Canute the Great and claimed that he had been offered the throne by Edward the Confessor. He joined forces with Edgar Atheling, the last remaining heir of the Anglo-Saxon royal house, and sent a force to attack king William in 1069. However, after capturing York, Sweyn accepted a payment from William to desert Edgar, who then returned into exile in Scotland. Sweyn failed another attempt in 1074/1075.

=== Relationship with the church ===
Sweyn feared that Archbishop Adalbert of Hamburg would fill the upper ranks of Denmark's churches with Germans, so he brought Anglo-Danes over from England to keep the Danish church independent. Under the influence of Sweyn, Denmark was divided into eight dioceses around 1060. He set the dioceses up by donating large tracts of land, with the Diocese of Roskilde being the most-favoured one, as he had a good relationship with Bishop Vilhelm. When Archbishop Adalbert died in 1072, Sweyn was able to deal directly with the Holy See.

He brought scholars to Denmark to teach him and his people Latin so they could converse with the rest of Europe on equal terms. Adam of Bremen travelled to meet this learned king and came away with greater respect for the king's patience and wisdom. Sweyn encouraged the building of churches all over Denmark, and Adam of Bremen was astounded that there were 300 churches in Scania alone, more than in all the other countries of the north put together.

=== Death ===
King Sweyn died at the royal estate Søderup, 10 kilometres (6.2 mi) west of Åbenrå at the Little Belt strait. The Danish chronicles inaccurately date his death to 1074, but it is known that he received and answered letters in 1075 and died in 1076. The king's body was carried to Roskilde Cathedral where he was interred in a pillar of the choir next to the remains of Bishop Vilhelm (who was the actual person who died in 1074). Later he was called the "father of kings" because five of his fifteen sons became kings of Denmark.

He was the last Viking ruler of Denmark and an ancestor of all subsequent Danish kings. The remains of other Danish kings are also entombed in Roskilde Cathedral. According to the saga, Sweyn's mother was entombed inside a pillar across from the chapel. However, analysis of mitochondrial DNA proved that this person was not the king's mother.

== Legacy ==
One of the legacies of King Sweyn was a fundamental change in Danish society which had been based on whether a person was free or a bondsman. Sweyn is often considered to be Denmark's last Viking king as well as the first medieval one. A strengthened church in alliance with the land-owning noble families begin to pit their power against the royal family. The peasants were left to fend for themselves.

Sweyn built a strong foundation for royal power through cooperation with the church. He completed the final partition of Denmark into dioceses by corresponding directly with the pope, bypassing the Archbishop of Hamburg-Bremen. During his reign hundreds of small wooden churches were built throughout the kingdom; many were rebuilt in stone in the 12th century. Sweyn sought to create a Nordic Archbishopric under Danish rule, a feat which his son Eric I accomplished.

Sweyn seems to have been able to read and write, and was described as an especially educated monarch by his personal friend Pope Gregory VII. He is the source of much of our current knowledge about Denmark and Sweden in the 9th and 10th centuries, having told the story of his ancestry to historian Adam of Bremen around 1070.

== Family ==
Sweyn's first marriage was to Gyda of Sweden, daughter of king Anund Jacob of Sweden. His second marriage, in 1050, was to Gunnhildr Sveinsdóttir, the stepmother of Gyda. The Archbishop of Hamburg-Bremen ordered that the union be dissolved, which was effectuated by Pope Leo IX. According to Adam of Bremen, Sweyn had a certain "Tora" at his court. Historian Sture Bolin argues that this "Tora" is actually Tora Torbergsdatter, the mother of king Olaf III of Norway, linking this to a passage about a king marrying the mother of a king named Olof. He took one mistress after another during his life. Sweyn fathered at least 20 children, of whom only one was born in wedlock.

With Gunnhildr:

1. Svend Svendsen, who died young

With various concubines:

1. Knud Magnus
2. Harald III Hen of Denmark (d. 1080)
3. Canute IV the Saint of Denmark (d. 1086)
4. Olaf I Hunger of Denmark (d. 1095)
5. Eric I Evergood of Denmark (d. 1103)
6. Svend Tronkræver (d. 1104)
7. Ulf Svendsen (Ubbe) (d. 1104)
8. Benedict Svendsen (d. 1086)
9. Bjørn Svendsen, Duke of Nordalbingien from 1099 (d. 1100)
10. Niels of Denmark (d. 1134)
11. Sigrid Svendsdatter (d. 1066), wife of prince Gottschalk
12. Ingerid, wife of Olav III of Norway
13. Sweyn the Crusader (d. 1097)
14. Thorgils Svendsen
15. Sigurd Svendsen, died in war against the Wends
16. Guttorm Svendsen
17. Ømund Svendsen
18. Ragnhild Svendsdatter, wife of Svein Aslaksson

=== Previously alleged children ===
1. Gunhild (Helene), whose existence is only known from the Gunhild Cross, used to be considered a daughter of King Sweyn II due to the inscription of the cross mentioning a great King Sweyn, but modern scholarship suggest she was a daughter of Sweyn III Grathe.

== See also ==
- List of Danish monarchs

== Sources ==
- Morris, Marc (2012). The Norman Conquest: The Battle of Hastings and the Fall of Anglo-Saxon England'. ISBN 978-1-4481-3602-5.
- Sturlason, Snorre. Heimskringla – The Norse King Sagas.

Sweyn Estridson House of Estridsen Born: c. 1019 Died: April 28 1076
Regnal titles
Preceded by Magnus the Good	King of Denmark; 1047–1076	Succeeded by Harald III
