= Trinity Church, Kristianstad =

Trinity Church
- Heliga trefaldighetskyrkan
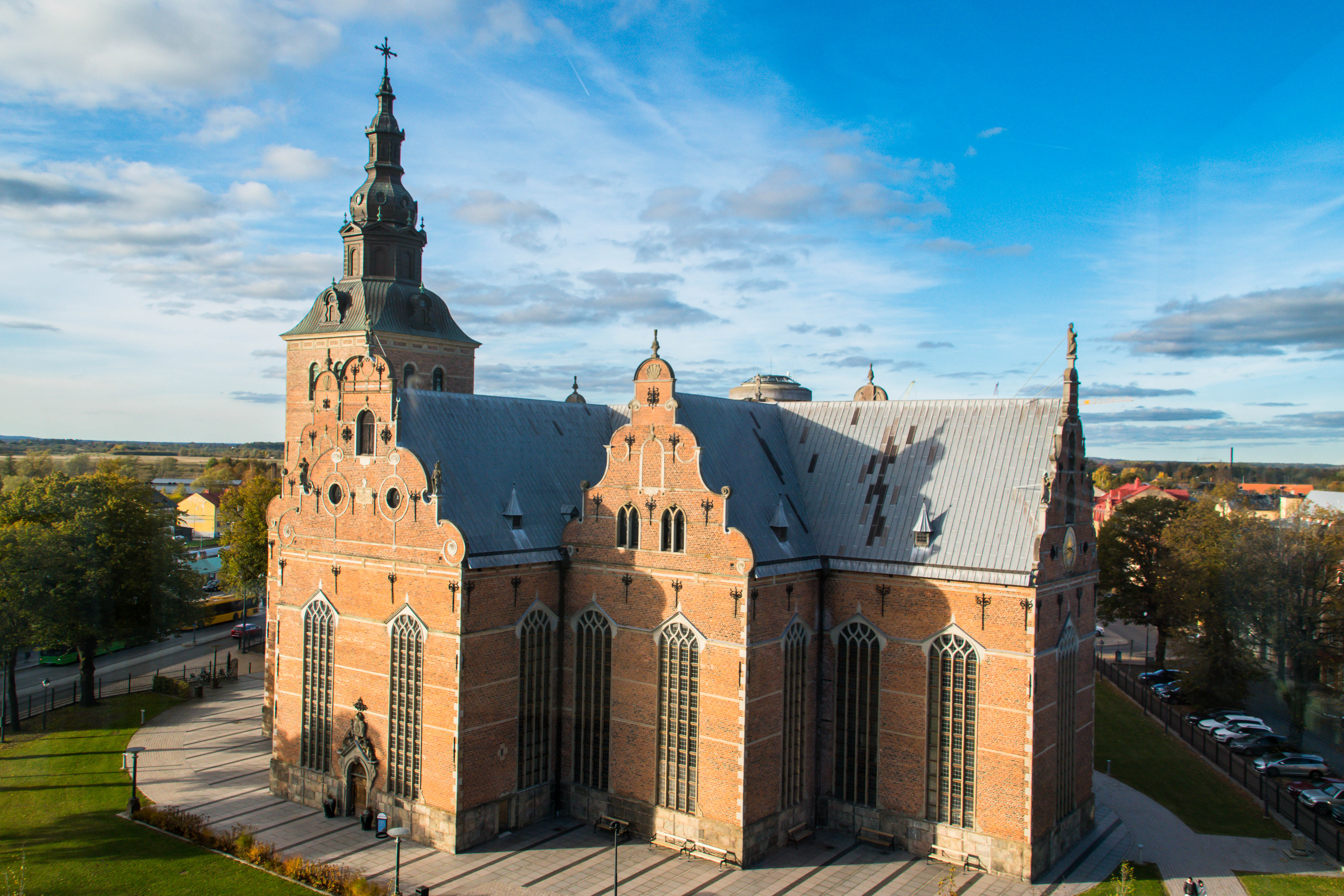
- Trinity Church
- Trinity Church
- 56°1′54.7″N 14°9′10.4″E
- Location: Kristianstad
- Country: Sweden
- Denomination: Church of Sweden

History
- Consecrated: 28 July 1628

Architecture
- Architect: Lorenz van Steenwinckel

Administration
- Diocese: Lund
- Parish: Kristianstad Holy Trinity

Trinity Church (Swedish: Heliga trefaldighetskyrkan) is a church building in Kristianstad, Sweden, built between 1617 and 1628 by Christian IV of Denmark. He had founded the city of Kristianstad in 1614 at a time when Scania was part of the Kingdom of Denmark. The church's large size and style reveal the king's ambitions for his new city.

== Architecture ==
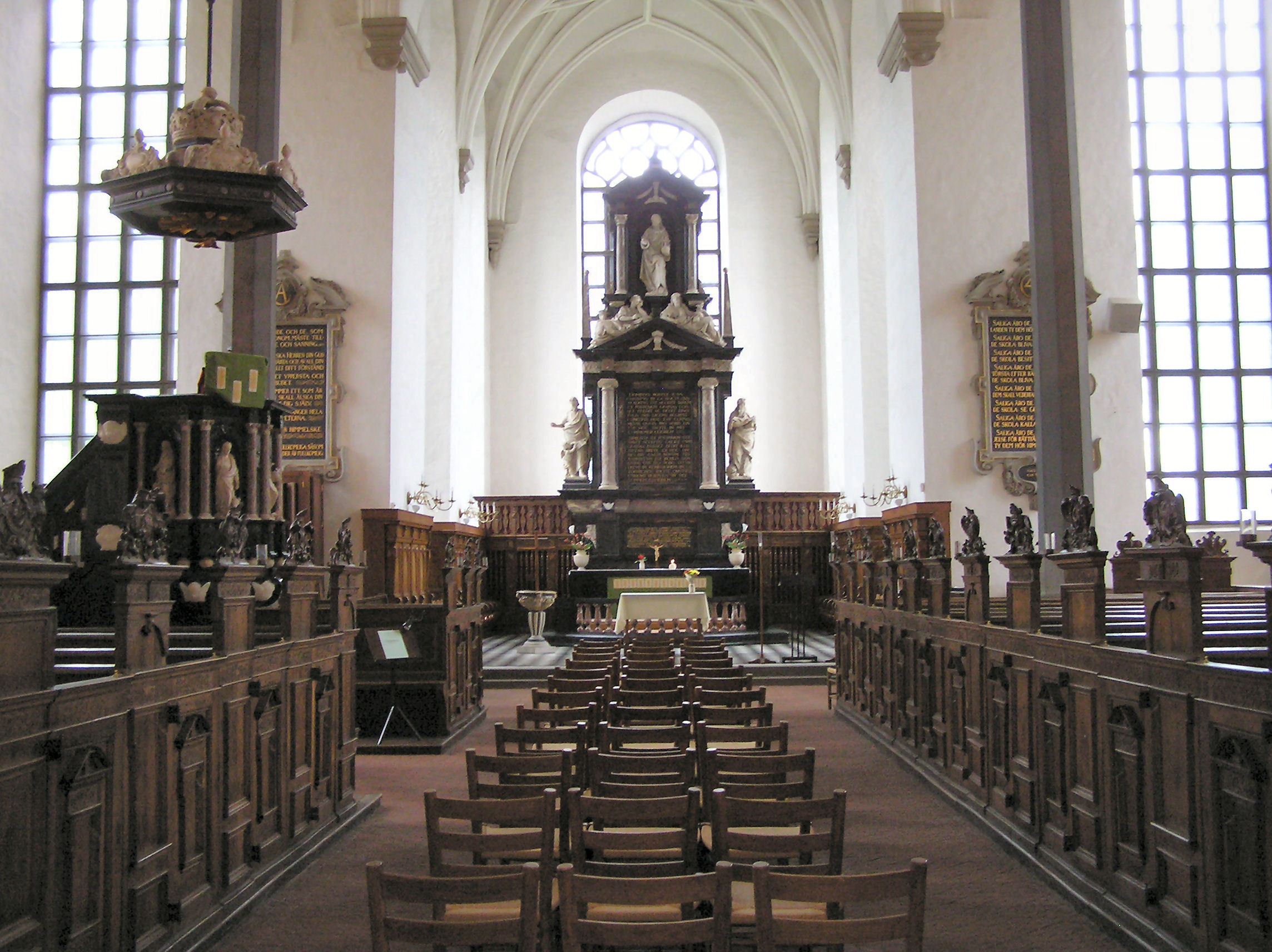
Nave and chancel.

Designed by the Flemish-Danish architect Lorenz van Steenwinckel, the grand building is widely considered by many to be Scandinavia's finest Renaissance church. Its extensive nave is able to accommodate congregations of up to 1,400. Like many Danish churches of the times, it is built of red brick. But this church is decorated with many sandstone statues and ornaments, including several monograms of Christian IV, testifying to his involvement.

The well-preserved interior has star-shaped cross vaults, supported by pillars of granite. Trinity Church has been little altered since it was built. The main addition is its 59-meter-tall tower constructed in 1865. The church is pleasantly and abundantly illuminated thanks to its 26 tall windows.

The entrance through the western tower opens into a six-bay nave, with wide aisles, terminating in a projecting eastern sanctuary. The vaults are covered with a cross-gabled roof, with large ornamented gables on the north and south sides.

== Furnishings and decorations ==
The pulpit, which is sculpted in Belgian and Italian marble, shows Christ and the four evangelists. The impressive canopy hanging above the pulpit weighs almost a ton.

The Baroque organ case survives, including the case pipes, from German-born Johan Lorentz's 1630 organ, but the organ itself has been replaced. The present organ is used both for concerts and church services.

The delicately carved benches are as old as the church itself.

== Gallery ==
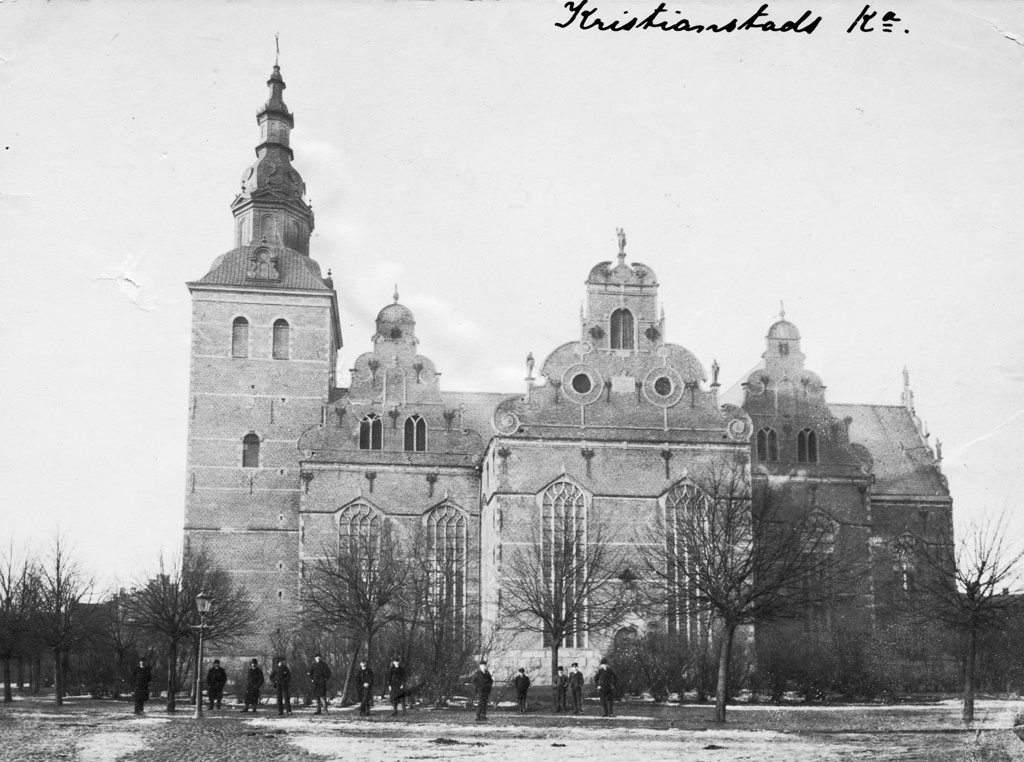
Photograph from the south, c. 1900

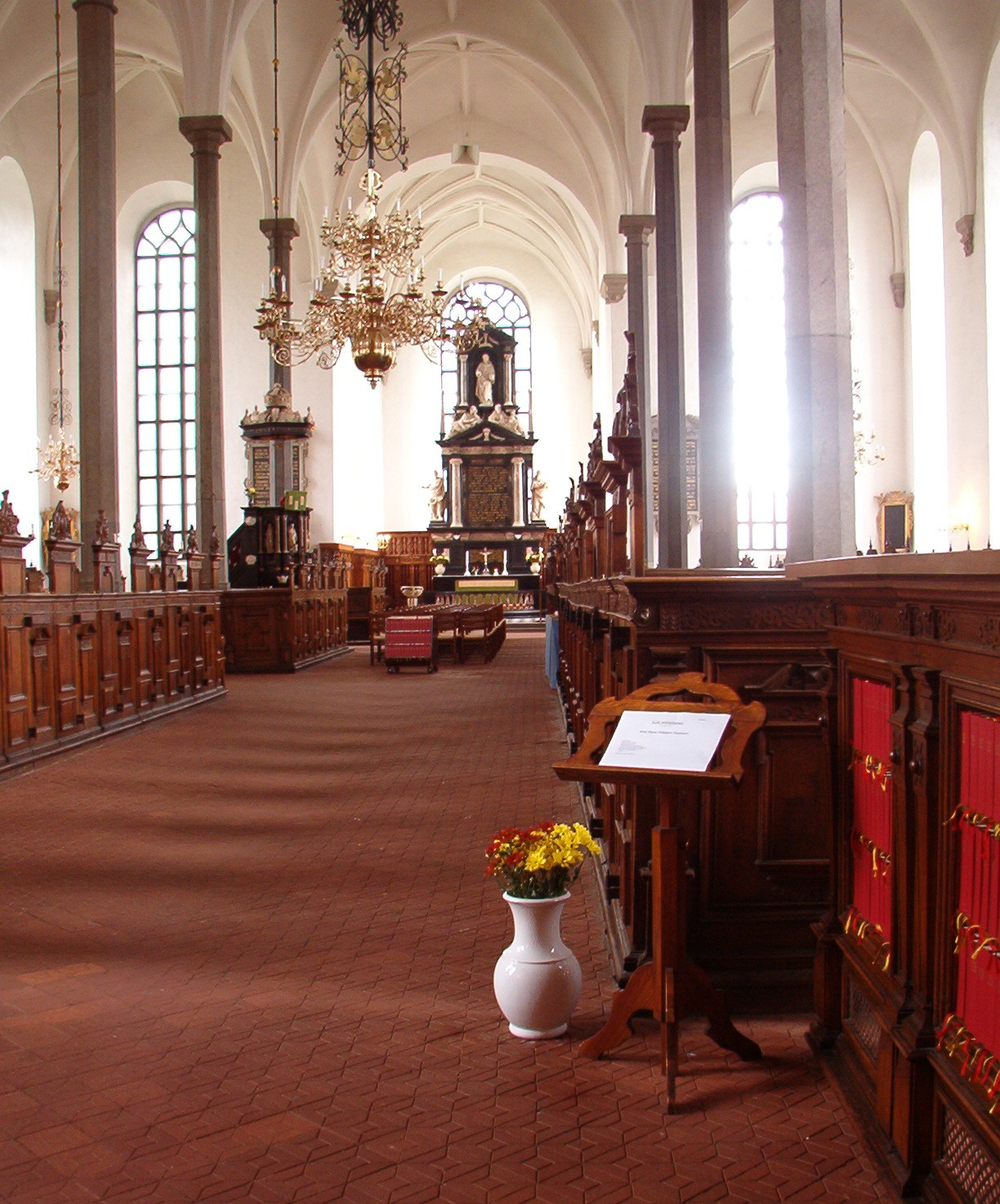
Interior with chandalier

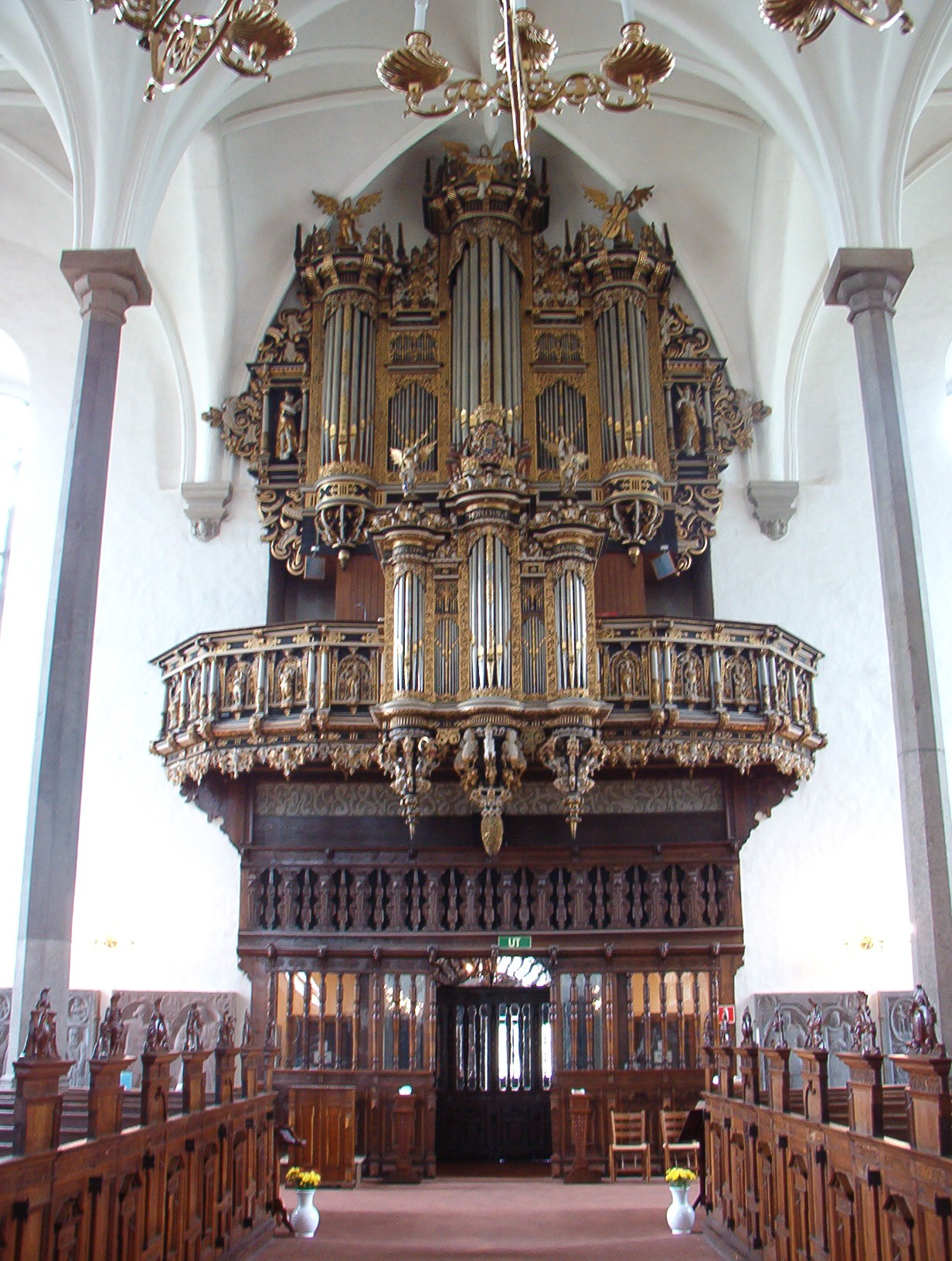
1630 organ case with original pipes

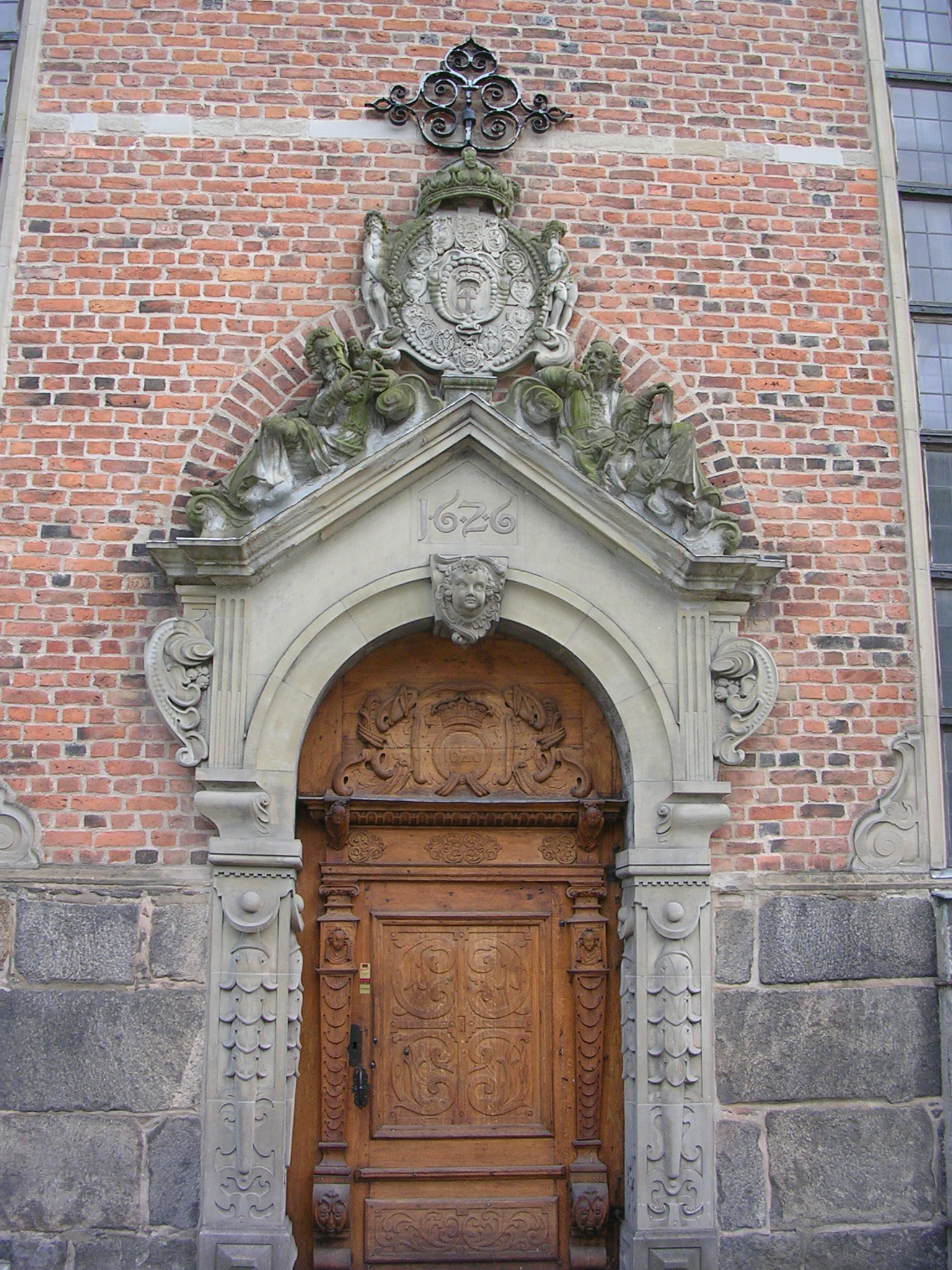
Main entrance through the tower
