= Roskilde Cathedral =

- Danish: Roskilde Domkirke
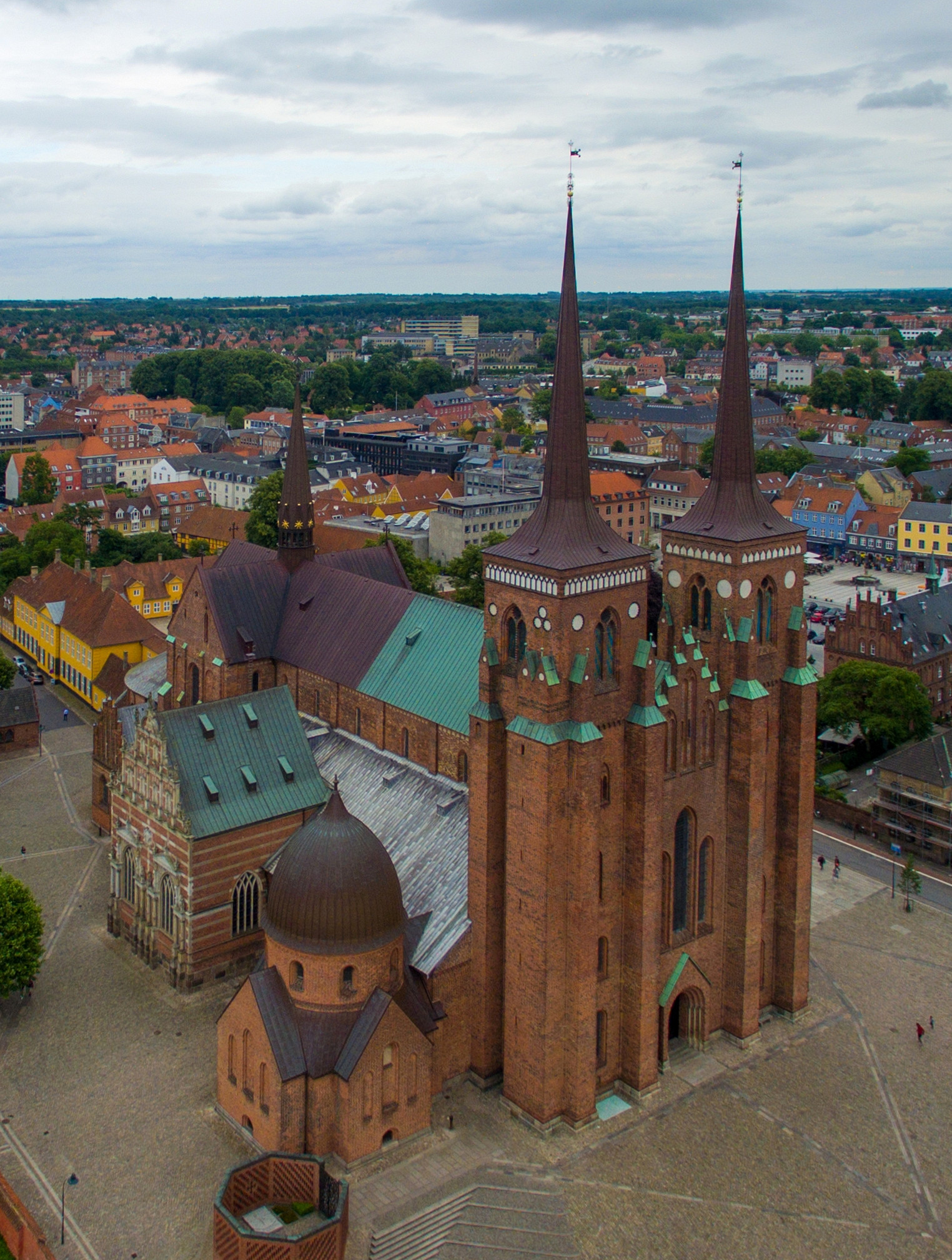
- View from the north-west
- Roskilde Cathedral
- 55°38′34″N 12°4′48″E
- Location: Roskilde
- Country: Denmark
- Denomination: Lutheran
- Previous denomination: Roman Catholic
- Website: www.roskildedomkirke.dk

History
- Status: Active
- Dedication: Virgin Mary (formerly St Lucius and the Holy Trinity)
- Consecrated: 1225

Architecture
- Functional status: Cathedral
- Heritage designation: protected monument 020410-79
- Architect(s): Absalon, Peder Sunesen
- Style: French Gothic, Dutch Renaissance, Neoclassicism, Byzantine Revival, Modernist
- Groundbreaking: c. 1170
- Completed: 1636

Specifications
- Length: 86 metres (282 ft)
- Width: 27 metres (89 ft)
- Height: 75.7 metres (248 ft)

Administration
- Diocese: Roskilde

Clergy
- Bishop: Ulla Thorbjørn Hansen

UNESCO World Heritage Site
- Criteria: Cultural: ii, iv
- Reference: 695
- Inscription: 1995 (19th Session)

Roskilde Cathedral (Danish: Roskilde Domkirke), in the city of Roskilde on the island of Zealand (Sjælland) in eastern Denmark, is a cathedral of the Lutheran Church of Denmark.

The cathedral is one of the most important churches in Denmark, and the official royal burial church of the Danish monarchs. It is also a UNESCO World Heritage Site. This is due to two criteria: the architecture of the cathedral shows 800 years of European architectural styles, and it is one of the earliest examples in Scandinavia of a Gothic cathedral to be built in brick; it encouraged the spread of the Brick Gothic style throughout Northern Europe. Constructed during the 12th and 13th centuries, the cathedral incorporates both Gothic and Romanesque architectural features in its design. The cathedral has been the main burial site for Danish monarchs since the 15th century. As such, it has been significantly extended and altered over the centuries to accommodate a considerable number of burial chapels and the many added chapels show different architectural styles.

The cathedral is a major tourist attraction, bringing in over 165,000 visitors annually. Since 1995, it has been listed as a UNESCO World Heritage Site due to its unique architecture. A working church, it also hosts concerts throughout the year.

== History ==
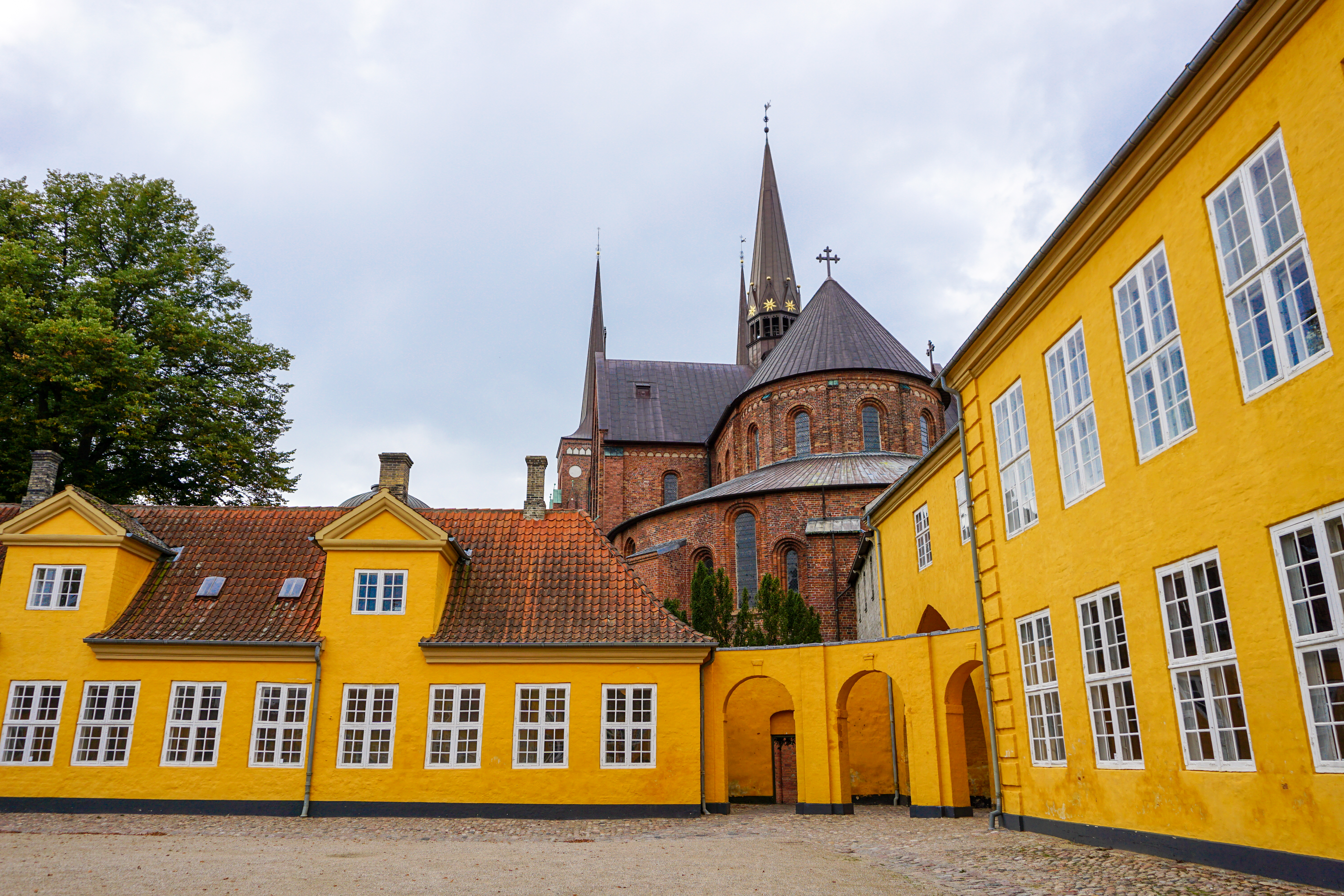
The cathedral seen from the Bispegården (Bishop's house).

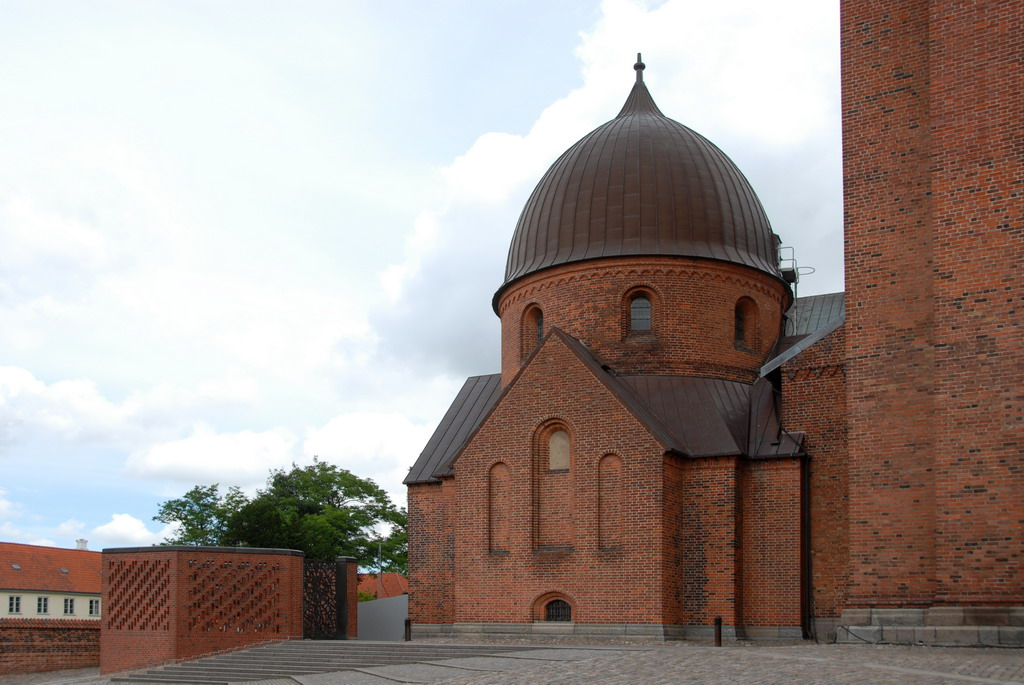
Christian IX's Chapel (right) and Frederik IX's Burial Site (left).

=== Previous churches ===
Roskilde was named the new capital of Denmark by King Harald Bluetooth around the year 960. The King had previously resided in Jelling, where he built a church and raised the Jelling stones, but after uniting the Danes and Norwegians, a move was necessary to enable the monarch to stay close to the centre of power in the new kingdom. According to written sources, when moving to Roskilde, Bluetooth built a royal farm and next to it, a small stave church, dedicated to the Holy Trinity. Little is known of the Trinity Church, let alone its architecture, but despite its brief history at least two events are known to have taken place. In Adam of Bremen's Gesta Hammaburgensis ecclesiae pontificum, there is an account of how the king's son, Sweyn Forkbeard, raised a rebellion against him, forcing him to flee to Jomsborg. When Bluetooth died in 985/986, the army that had been raised against him brought his body to Roskilde and buried him in the church he had built. His son, Swein Forkbeard, may also have been buried in the church. At Christmas in 1026, Ulf the Earl was murdered by one of Cnut the Great's housecarls. Though the sources differ, this happened either inside the church (Chronicon Roskildense) or at the royal farm (Saxo Grammaticus's Gesta Danorum). Ulf had been married to Cnut the Great's sister Estrid, who was outraged by the murder and demanded a weregild.

There is some doubt as to when Roskilde became the seat of the Bishop of Roskilde. When Sweyn Forkbeard conquered England in 1013, he began sending English bishops to Denmark, a process which was continued by his successor Cnut the Great. This caused some conflict with the Archbishop of Hamburg, who regarded Scandinavia as belonging to the Archdiocese of Bremen. The earliest known bishop of Roskilde was Gerbrand, who had been a cleric with Cnut the Great, and who was intercepted by the Archbishop of Hamburg-Bremen's men when he sailed to Denmark in 1022. Only after swearing allegiance to the archbishop was he allowed to continue his journey. The archbishop may have had good reason to be suspicious, as documents of the time suggest that Cnut the Great may have planned to create an archdiocese in Roskilde, with Gerbrand as archbishop.

Funded by the weregild Estrid Svendsdatter had received, the old Trinity Church was torn down and construction of a simple stone cathedral began around 1026. This may have formed the base of the later travertine cathedral, but it is difficult to tell, as two cathedrals have subsequently been built on the same site. However, an archaeological excavation in 1968 showed that the bases of both buildings were at the same height, which would not make sense if two separate buildings had been constructed in a 50-year span.

It is, however, certain that a travertine cathedral was built at the location. Construction had been started by Bishop Wilhelm between 1060–1073 and was completed by his successor Svend Nordmand around 1080. The new cathedral was built using travertine, a stone found in abundance around Roskilde Fjord. It was constructed as a basilica in Romanesque style with half-rounded interior arches to support the flat interior ceiling, with two towers flanking the west front entrance. To the north, a three-sided stone monastery was constructed for monks and others associated with the cathedral. Svend Nordmand's successor, Arnold, added a wall around the building, which was to act as a guarantee of safety for anyone who sought sanctuary there. However, Arnold was also considered the bishop who lost the Archdiocese of Scandinavia to Lund Cathedral, as a result of his lack of drive and motivation.

With the new cathedral completed, there was a desire to obtain a relic for it. Two canons (clerics of the cathedral) were dispatched to Rome to find something suitable. Legend holds that while they were resting after their arrival, St Lucius, who had been pope from 253 to 255, appeared before them and told them that he had been chosen to be the patron saint of Roskilde until the end of time. The next day, the two canons were taken to Santa Cecilia in Trastevere to choose amongst the many relics there. They saw a skull shining brightly, the skull of St Lucius. On their return, while the canons were sailing through the Great Belt, their ship came under attack by a powerful demon that had long lurked in Danish waters. The crew drew straws and the lot fell on the canon carrying the skull of St Lucius. He offered a prayer to the saint, washed the skull three times, threw the water in the ocean, and jumped overboard. To everyone's surprise, the canon was able to walk on the water. The demon disappeared screaming into the depths, never to be seen again.

It is not known for certain which year the relic arrived in Roskilde, only the date, August 25, as it was on that date that the relic's arrival was always celebrated. The first written mention of the relic dates to Ælnoth, a monk in Odense, who described it in a work on the life of Canute the Holy in 1122. Another item of the period, a seal carved from a walrus tusk, depicting St Lucius between the twin towers of the cathedral, has been dated to the early 12th century. The relic may have been acquired to help win Roskilde the archdiocese, which was given to Lund in 1103/1104.

=== Current cathedral ===
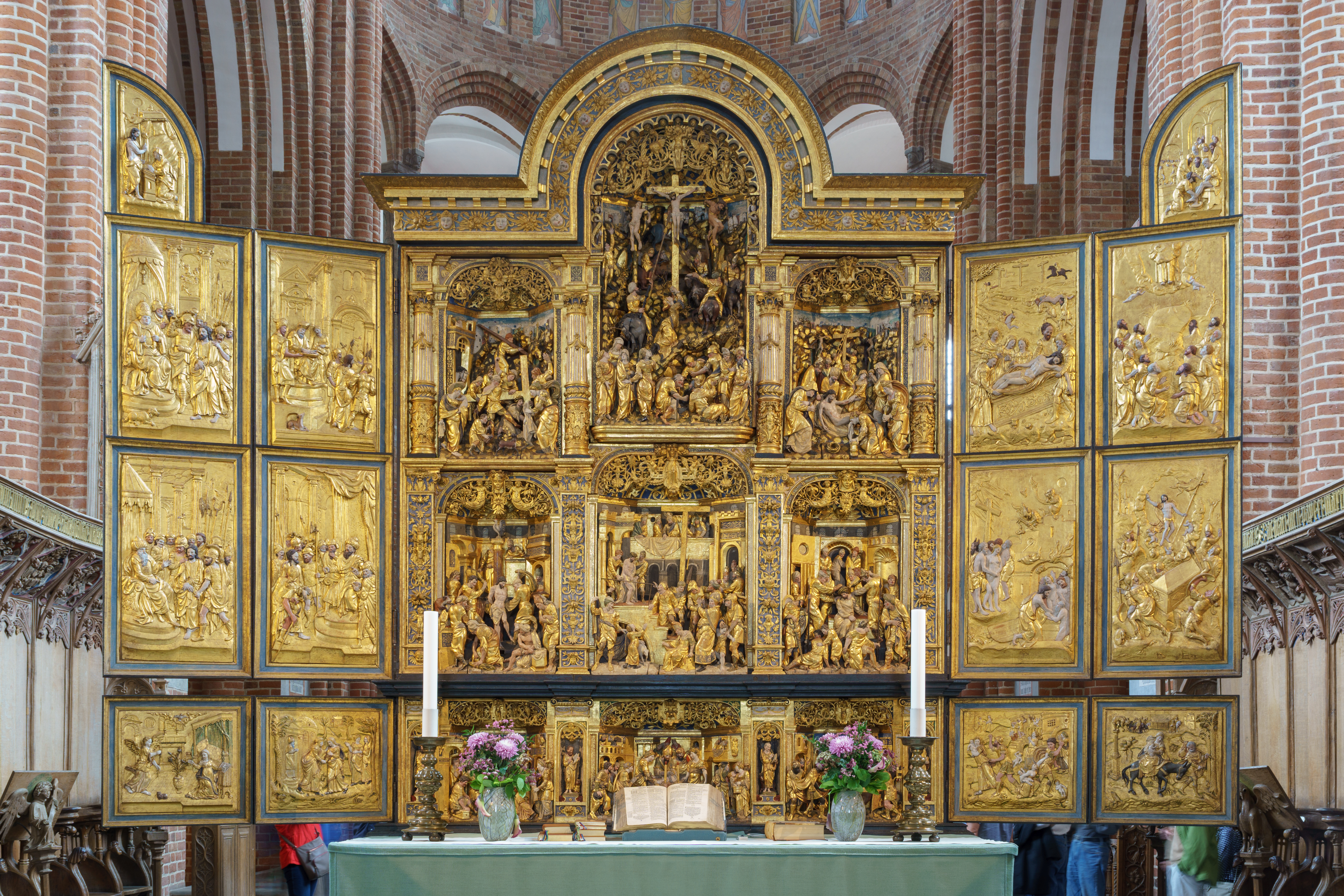
The altar

It has been accepted, that soon after he became Bishop of Roskilde in 1157, Absalon began to expand the travertine cathedral. In 1160, the art of firing bricks was brought to Denmark from Italy by monks, and the new material was employed. Researchers decided to build a new cathedral around the existing one, allowing services to continue during construction. It has long been believed that Bishop Absalon began construction, and when Absalon was forced to surrender his position as bishop of Roskilde in 1191, only the two floors of the apse, the choir towers and part of the transept had been completed. Absalon's successor, Peder Sunesen, embracing the new French Gothic style, later made significant changes to the plans, tearing down the choir towers and reducing the width of the transept. But new research points to Peder Sunesen as the main initiator and hence instead of rebuilding it, it was constructed in the transition period between Romanesque and Gothic show elements from both styles in the cathedral.

The choir was completed and inaugurated in 1225, allowing services to begin there, and the old travertine cathedral was torn down. Work on the nave continued for the next 55 years, limited by funds, lack of kilns to fire the bricks, and the winters. With the exception of the two towers on the west façade, the cathedral was completed by 1280, and work on the interior proceeded, slowed by a fire in 1282 which also destroyed several of the canons' houses in the area. Several chapels were also added to the cathedral, and in 1405, work on the towers was completed.

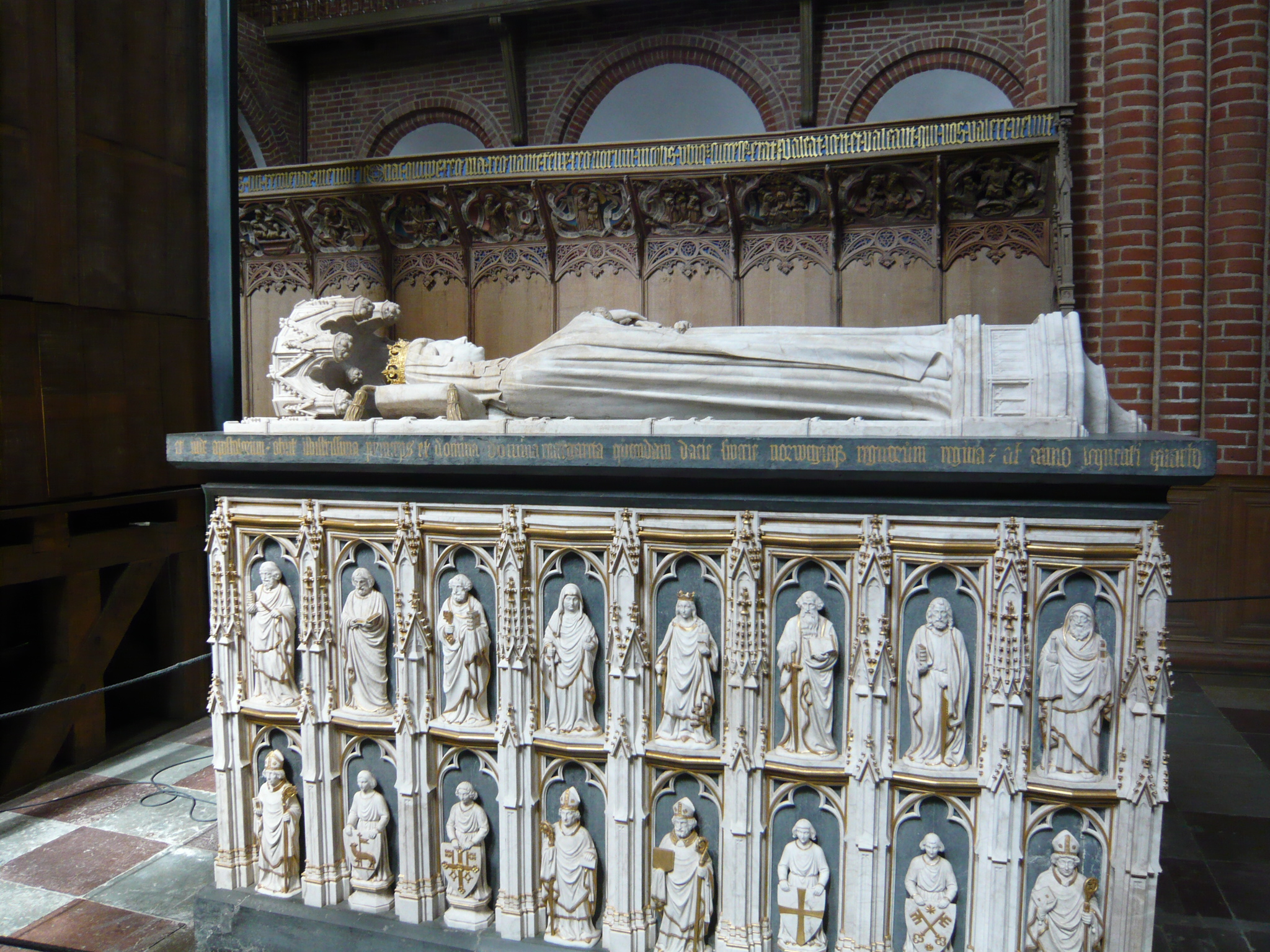
Sarcophagus of Scandinavian Queen Margrethe I.

When Margrethe I died in 1412, she was buried in her family's chapel at Sorø Klosterkirke. But the following year bishop Peder Jensen Lodehat, who had been the queen's chancellor and religious advisor, brought her body to Roskilde Cathedral. The monks in Sorø were outraged, above all because the loss of the Queen's earthly remains would mean a significant loss in income from requiems — at that time monks and clergy would typically have been paid to say requiem masses for a dead person, and for a queen such masses would likely have been said on a regular basis in perpetuity, each one incurring a fee — as well as a loss of prestige. Though often blamed on the Bishop, it is quite possible that the move was orchestrated by the Queen's adoptive son, Eric of Pomerania. This is reinforced by the inscription on the sarcophagus, which describes how it was given by the new king, Eric VII, in 1423.

In his "Chronica novella", German chronicler de:Hermann Korner describes the vast, three-day-long burial ceremony involving King Eric VII, several noblemen, the Archbishop of Lund, and all of the Danish bishops. There is an account of how the procession granted substantial gifts to each of the 50 altars in the cathedral. On the first day, the royal couple would give each altar a golden ornament, a golden antependium and a silver chalice; the noblemen would each bestow a florin on the altars; and the knights, squires, and anyone else who wished to bestow gifts would provide each altar with silver coins from Lübeck. On the second and third days, the royal couple would bestow two nobles on each altar, the noblemen would bestow a florin on them, and the rest of the procession would bestow silver coins as they wished. What was left of silver coins were then put in a bowl, to be cast among the poor in Roskilde.

On 14 May 1443, a fire swept through Roskilde, destroying most of the city and all but three of the clergy's houses. The fire was so intense that the glass windows cracked, and the lead roofing melted. The cathedral was badly damaged and it was not until 1463 that the bishop, Oluf Mortensen, could rededicate it. To help with its reconstruction, the bishops of Denmark each signed a letter granting 40 days of indulgence to whoever would contribute to its cost. The reconstruction could also have been helped by the decision of Christian I to build a chapel at the cathedral. The Chapel of the Magi was built during the 1460s, and together with the sarcophagus of Margrethe I and the remains from the previous churches, it marks the earliest royal burials.

The Reformation arrived in 1536, marking a sharp negative turn for Roskilde Cathedral. Not only was the Bishop of Roskilde, Joachim Rønnow, jailed in Copenhagen Castle, the diocese was moved to Copenhagen and Peder Palladius, became the new Superintendent of Zealand and later a bishop. Hans Tausen, who had sought to encourage wide adoption of the Reformation, was sent to Roskilde in 1538 to help convert the clergymen who were opposed to the new ideas. At a Reformation meeting in 1540, it was decided that all of the bishop's property was now to belong to the King, both symbolically and in reality the head of the Church of Denmark. The cathedral had already been forced to hand over some of its property during the Count's Feud, but following the decision and with an impending war against the Swedes, the confiscation of church property was stepped up. Among the cathedral's most prized possessions was a wooden statue of St Lucius, covered in gold and gems. The chapter fought hard to try and retain its property, at one point asking for a receipt for some of the confiscated goods, to which the king's men replied that the King did not need to hand out a receipt for something that already belonged to him.

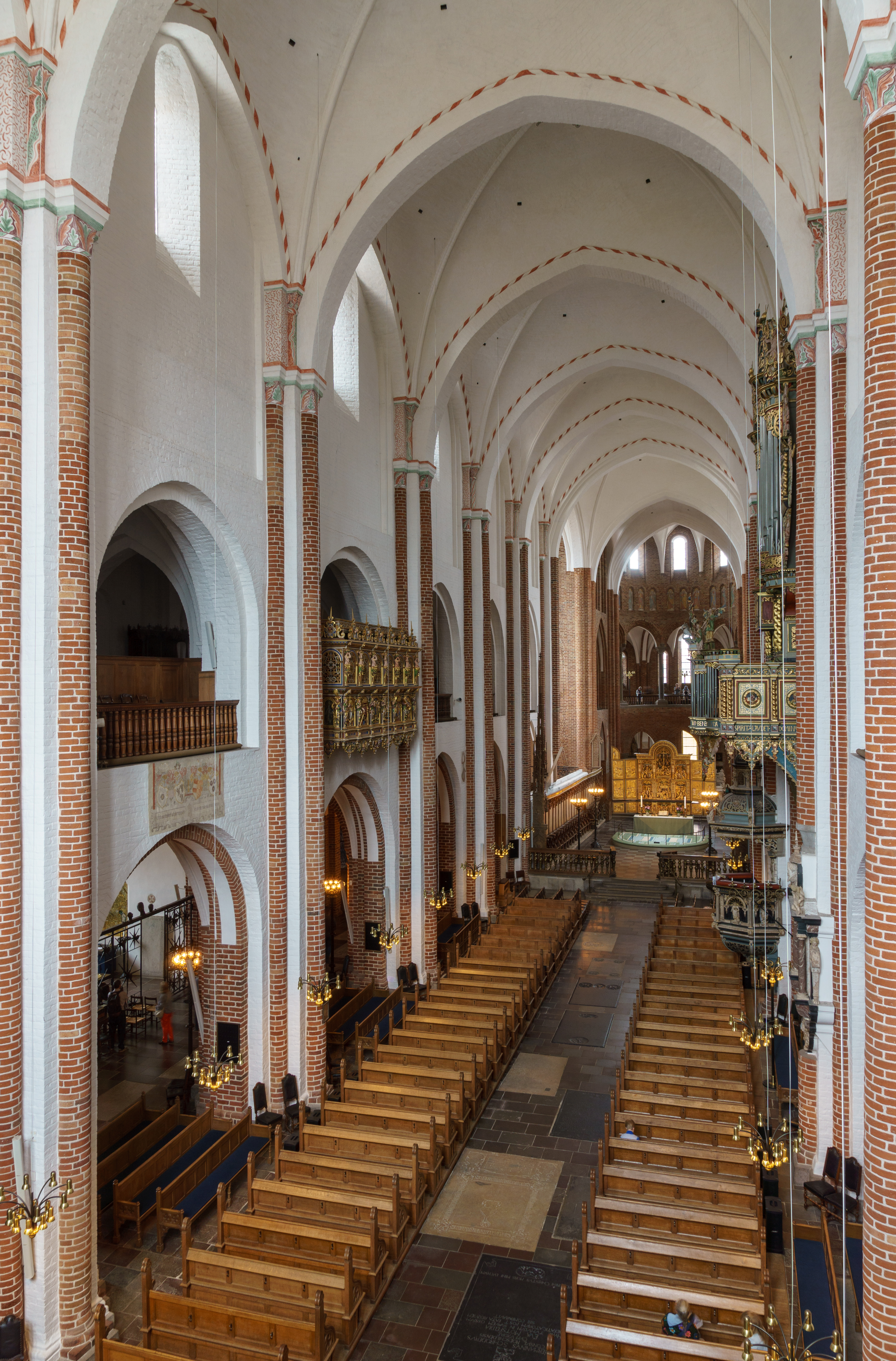
The nave of the cathedral

After the Reformation, the cathedral was opened up to the ordinary congregation, necessitating the purchase of new furniture, especially pews. As in other former Catholic cathedrals, the choir, which had been separated from the nave by a large wall, was left intact with the altar placed against the wall.

In March 1590, James VI of Scotland and his bride Anne of Denmark visited Roskilde Cathedral. They gave rewards to the organists, musicians, and bell ringers.

While the cathedral suffered financial hardship, having been forced to give away all its property (which at the time included one in every four farms on Zealand and 30 large estates), it was endowed with a variety of gifts from Christian IV: The altarpiece (between 1555 and 1623), a royal box ca 1600, the pulpit in 1610, his own burial chapel in 1614, the construction of the iconic twin spires in 1633 and finally a grand Renaissance sandstone entrance portal in 1635.

On 26 February 1658, the Treaty of Roskilde was signed in the cathedral. In the loot the Swedes took from the cathedral, was the golden dress of Margrethe I, which had hung in a closet near her sarcophagus. The dress was taken by the Swedish queen consort Hedwig Eleonora and is now located at Uppsala Cathedral. In 1690, Christian V ordered the old Catholic choir cleared, so he could create a crypt beneath it for the children he had had with his mistress Sophie Amalie. This also allowed for the altar to be moved to its present position.

In 1774, work on the third royal burial chapel, Frederick V's chapel, began with the removal of the pre-existing Chapel of Our Lady. Money soon ran out, and it was not until 1825 that the work was completed. In the meantime, in 1806, the cathedral sold its inventory from its Catholic days at a notorious auction. Among the items sold was a grand crucifix which went to a local coppersmith. While he was sawing the crucifix into firewood, the head of Jesus split open and a small, golden patriarchal cross fell out. Upon closer inspection, it was revealed that the cross was hollow and that a splinter from Christ's cross was hidden inside. Rumour of the find quickly reached the Royal Art Collection, later the National Museum of Denmark, which immediately purchased it.

In 1871, the entrance portal was replaced with one that matched the rest of the cathedral, while the old portal was donated to Holmen Church. However, when the new portal arrived, the churchwarden was horrified to see it was a poor copy of the old style. But he had no choice but to erect it.

Work on the fourth royal burial chapel began in 1915, and prior to its completion in 1924, Roskilde was once again made a diocese. On 27 August 1968, as restoration work on the Margrethe spire was nearing completion, the spire burned, threatening to collapse into the choir. During firefighting operations, members of the civil defense and church staff covered the canons' chairs, the altar, and the sarcophagi in the retrochoir with damp fire blankets, hoping to prevent damage to the invaluable items. The Defence Minister of Denmark ordered a complete ban on jet operations in the area, pending investigations into whether the vaults were in danger of collapsing. It was later discovered, that despite a total ban on any heat sources in the area where the restoration was taking place, the craftsmen had been smoking and using blowtorches in the loft. The latest addition to the cathedral was in 1985, when the New Burial Ground, also known as Frederik IX's Burial Ground, was inaugurated.

In 2018, the future resting place and monument for the then-queen Margrethe II, who abdicated in 2024, were placed in the chapel of St. Brigitte. The design is made by a Danish sculptor Bjørn Nørgaard. A model is at display in the cathedral alongside an exhibition on the tradition of royal burials.

== Description ==
Frescoes of Christian I and Dorothea of Brandenburg's royal coats of arms in the Chapel of the Magi

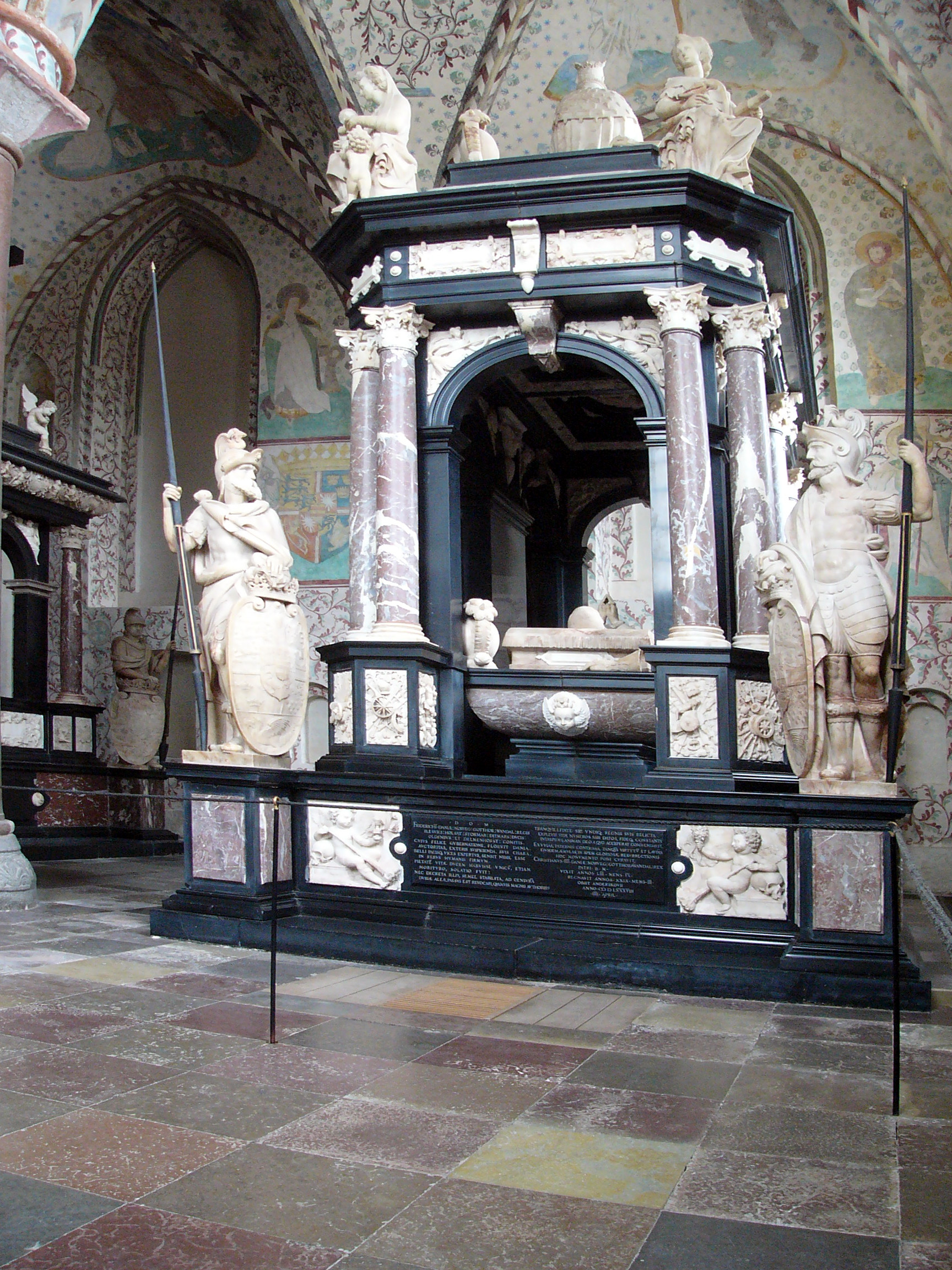
Sepulchral monument of Frederick II by Gert van Egen in the Chapel of the Magi

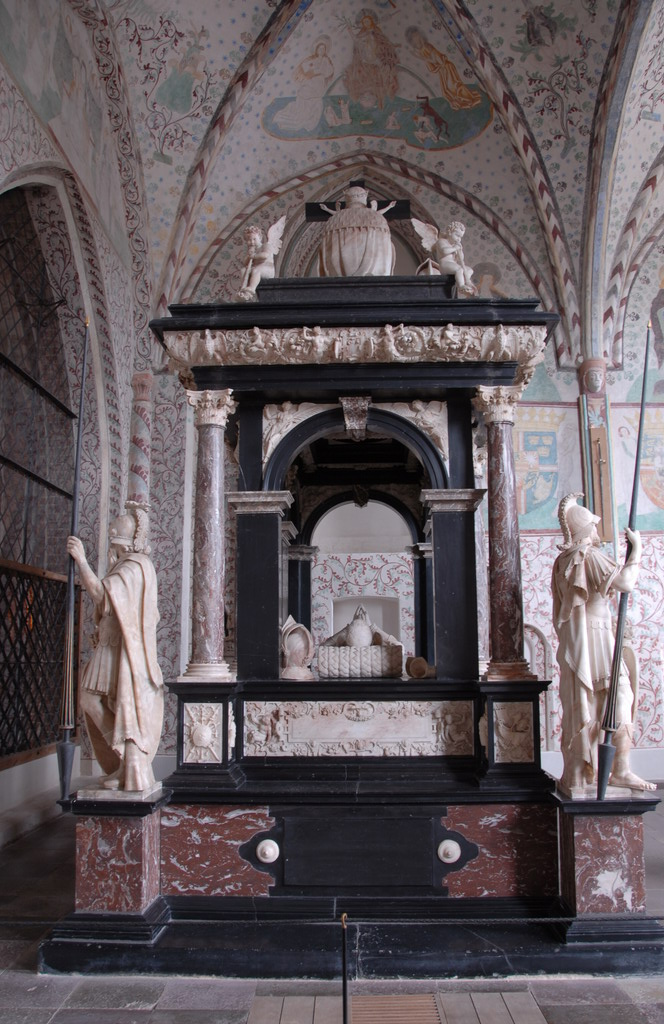
Sepulchral monument of Christian III by Cornelis Floris

=== Chapels ===
==== Chapel of the Magi (Christian I's chapel) ====
When King Christopher III died childless in 1448, his widow Dorothea of Brandenburg remarried the newly chosen king, Christian I. Within a few years, he became king of Denmark, Norway, and Sweden, and Dorothea had given birth to the future king John, thus establishing the House of Oldenburg. Against this background of events, the Christian I decided to build a grand chapel at the cathedral. The instrument of foundation was signed on 28 April 1459, which not only ordered the construction of the chapel but also granted large tracts of land to the church. In the spring of 1462, the king applied to Pope Pius II for indulgence for having constructed the chapel, which was finally granted upon his visit to Pope Sixtus IV in Rome in 1474.

Built in Gothic style, in line with the rest of the cathedral, the chapel consists of two floors, the lower floor intended as a burial chapel for Christian I and the upper floor as Great Hall for the members of the King's newly created Fellowship of the Mother of God, the precursor to the modern-day Order of the Elephant. The two floors rest on a central granite pillar, the so-called King's Pillar, where numerous kings have had their height measured over the years. Amongst the kings measured, Peter the Great, measured in 1716, stands tallest, while Chulalongkorn of Siam, measured in 1907, is the smallest. The height mark for Christian I is believed to be a technical error, as the King may have been tall, but not the giant the marker would suggest.

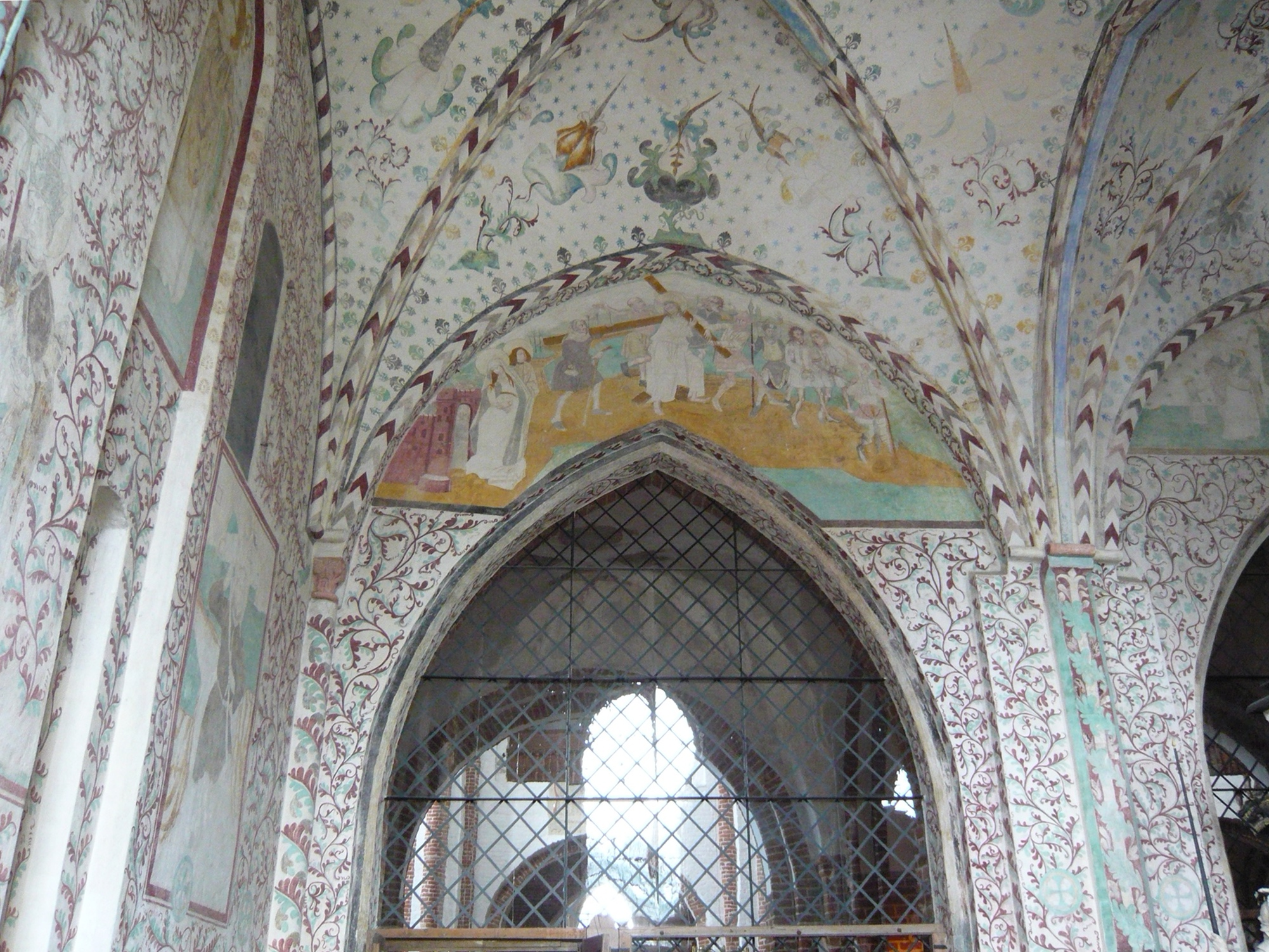
Frescos from c. 1460 decorate the chapel

The burials of Christian I and Queen Dorothea are marked with a pair of simple stones, as the chapel itself was to be considered their sepulchral monument, while the sepulchral monuments of Christian III and Frederick II dominate the lower floor. Christian III's alabaster, Rouge Belge and Noir Belge monument was created 1574–75 by Antwerpian sculptor Cornelis Floris. When the sculptor died in October 1575, the monument was more or less complete, lacking only its weapons and inscriptions, which were to be added by the herald Jan Baptist Guidetty. In fact, they were never added, and when the Spanish sacked Antwerp in November 1576, the monument was held until the widow of Cornelis Floris paid a ransom. The widow then sent word to the Danish court, requesting that the monument be retrieved and her contribution covered, which was not done until 1578. When the monument arrived in Elsinore, two local stonemasons set to work completing the monument, and in the summer of 1580 it was finally placed in the chapel.

Frederick II's monument, crafted from the same materials, was built 1594–1598 by the Flemish sculptor Gert van Egen, who was a pupil of Cornelis Floris and was a resident of Elsinore. Both monuments are empty, however, as the coffins have been buried below the floor of the chapel. King John was also supposed to have been buried in the chapel, but in his later years, he and his wife enjoyed living in Næsbyhoved Castle near Odense so much, that he expressed a preference to be buried in the town's Franciscan cathedral. However, the bishop and canons in Roskilde claimed that the King had determined that he was to be buried in Roskilde. The King's widow, Christina of Saxony, sent a letter to Pope Leo X asking for assistance, and in his reply, the Pope stated that a man's last wish must always be followed, and the King was therefore buried in Odense.

The chapel's vaults and walls are richly decorated with frescos, dating from the 1460s when the chapel was created by Christian I and his wife. Once whitewashed over, they were rediscovered in 1826. The arms of the King and Queen decorate the chapel's east wall.

The upper floor is currently used as a museum, displaying various artifacts such as old coloured stained glass windows and presenting the history of the cathedral.

==== Christian IV's chapel ====
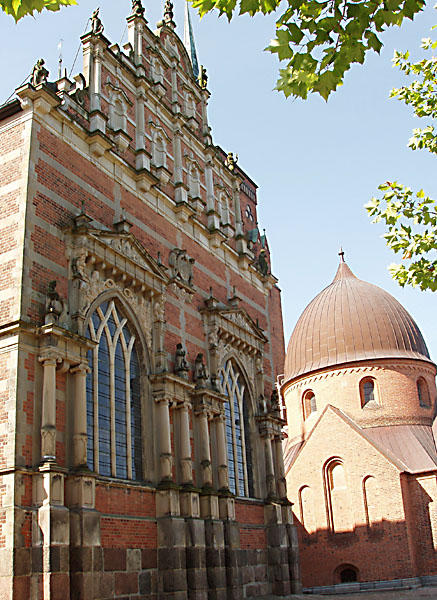
Exterior of Christian IV's Chapel

Construction of the chapel was ordered by Christian IV himself in 1613, after the death of his Queen Anne Catherine the year before, and upon realising that space inside the cathedral was running out. Built in Dutch Renaissance style, work on exterior of the chapel was begun in 1614 by Lorenz van Steenwinckel and completed in 1641 by his brother, Hans van Steenwinckel the Younger. The exterior was constructed in red brick with a corbie stepped gable facing north. On each of the gable steps, a sandstone figure is placed, representing each of the Christian virtues. Next to the gable's windows, four putti are placed, each holding up one of the symbols of death: a skull, a scythe, a torch pointing downwards, and an hourglass. At the centre of the gable, the King's escutcheon is found.

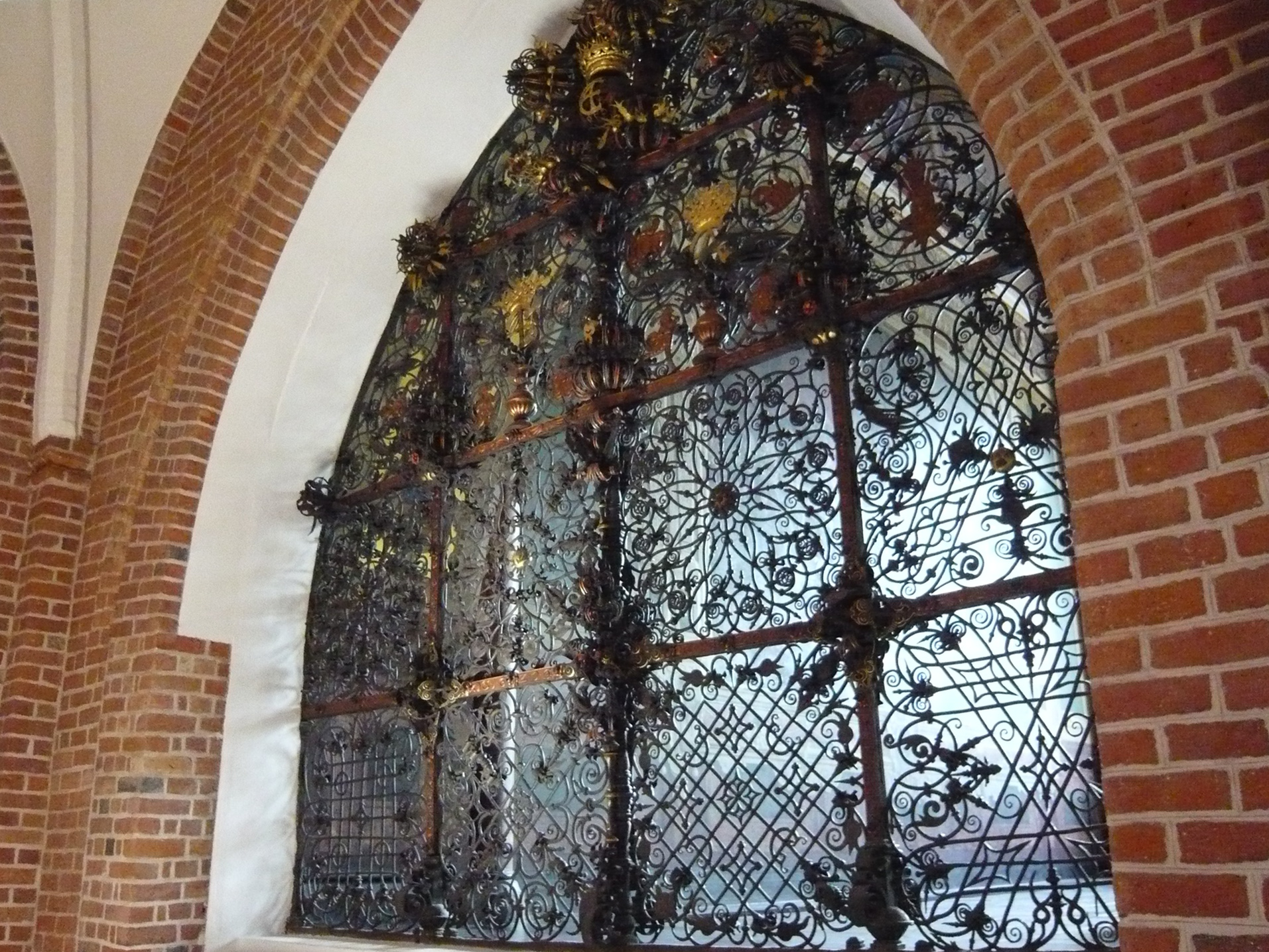
Caspar Finckes latticework

The wrought-iron lattice separating the chapel from the nave was forged by Caspar Fincke in 1619, and contains a quip by its creator:

Caspar Fincke bin ich benant
Dieser arbeit bin ich bekant

(Rough translation: Caspar Fincke I am named, for this work I am famed).

Upon the death of Christian IV in 1648 the interior had not been completed, and the King's coffin was placed in the crypt below instead. The King had commissioned his own monument, depicting him and his queen kneeling before a crucifix, but since it had been completed before his death, the monument had been temporarily placed in storage in the king's arsenal. When the arsenal burned in 1647, all that remained of the monument was the grand sandstone crucifix and a head carved from alabaster. The crucifix was subsequently placed in Holmen Church, while the head was given to the National Museum of Denmark. Christian IV's successors were each unable to provide a fitting resting place for the King, and it was not until 1840 and Christian VIII that work was finally begun. He had hoped to see the project finished by 1848, the 200th anniversary of Christian IV's death, but it was not until 1870 that the work was completed.

Work on the interior began in 1840 when Christian VIII ordered a statue of Christian IV from famed sculptor Bertel Thorvaldsen. This was to be part of a planned monument for Christian IV, which was to be designed by architect G.F. Hetcsh, but it still had to be decided who was going to create the decorations. In 1845 a commission tasked Heinrich Eddelien with the job, but work progressed slowly, perhaps due to Christian VIII's close concern with the matter and criticism of the proposed works. When Christian VIII died in 1848, the project lost its major motivational force, as the new king, Frederick VII, was not sufficiently interested in seeing project finished. When Eddelien died in 1852, only the work on the starry vaulted ceiling and the allegory motives beneath it had been completed, and work ground to a complete halt.

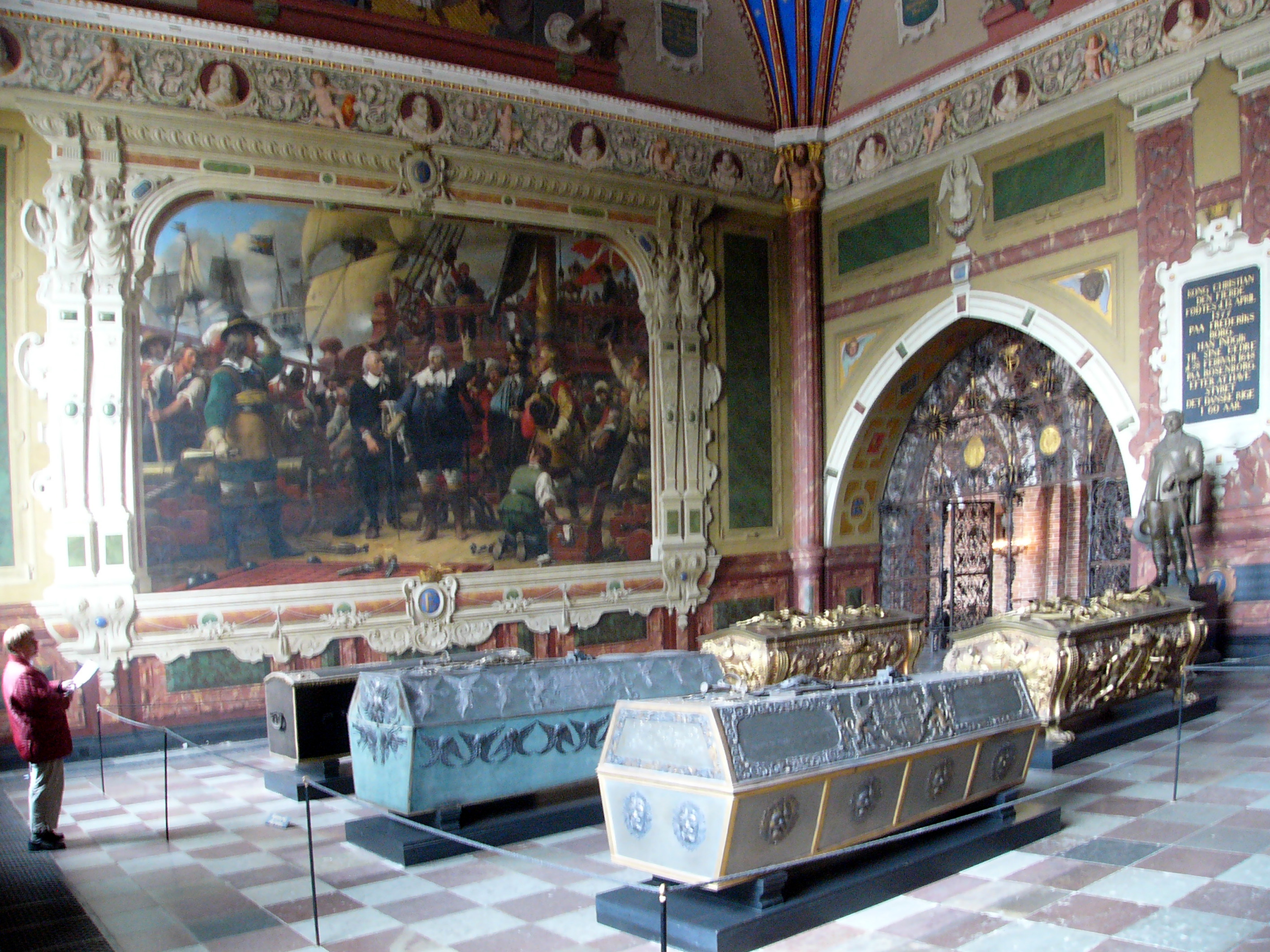
Interior of Christian IV's Chapel.

In 1856, Georg Hilker added a frieze below the ceiling vault, which was to act as a separator between the ceiling and wall decorations. When Wilhelm Marstrand and Heinrich Hansen were finally appointed in 1860, it was the finance minister, C.E. Fenger, who was responsible. The original commission was outraged that the minister had acted behind their backs, but times had changed since the commission had been formed, and with the National Liberal Party in power, there was an increased focus on the national attitude. The National Liberal minister felt that seeing the completion of Christian IV's chapel, which he regarded as a national relic, would strengthen the national sentiment in the developing conflict with Prussia.

Marstrand and Hansen submitted their decoration proposals in 1861, having decided that Marstrand would paint the paintings while Hansen would paint the framings. That year the pair traveled to France to study oil painting on plaster. Marstrand then spent the summers of 1864–1866 in Roskilde, painting one wall per year. When Marstrand had finished his work, the five coffins in the chapel were placed in their current positions.

==== Frederick V's chapel ====
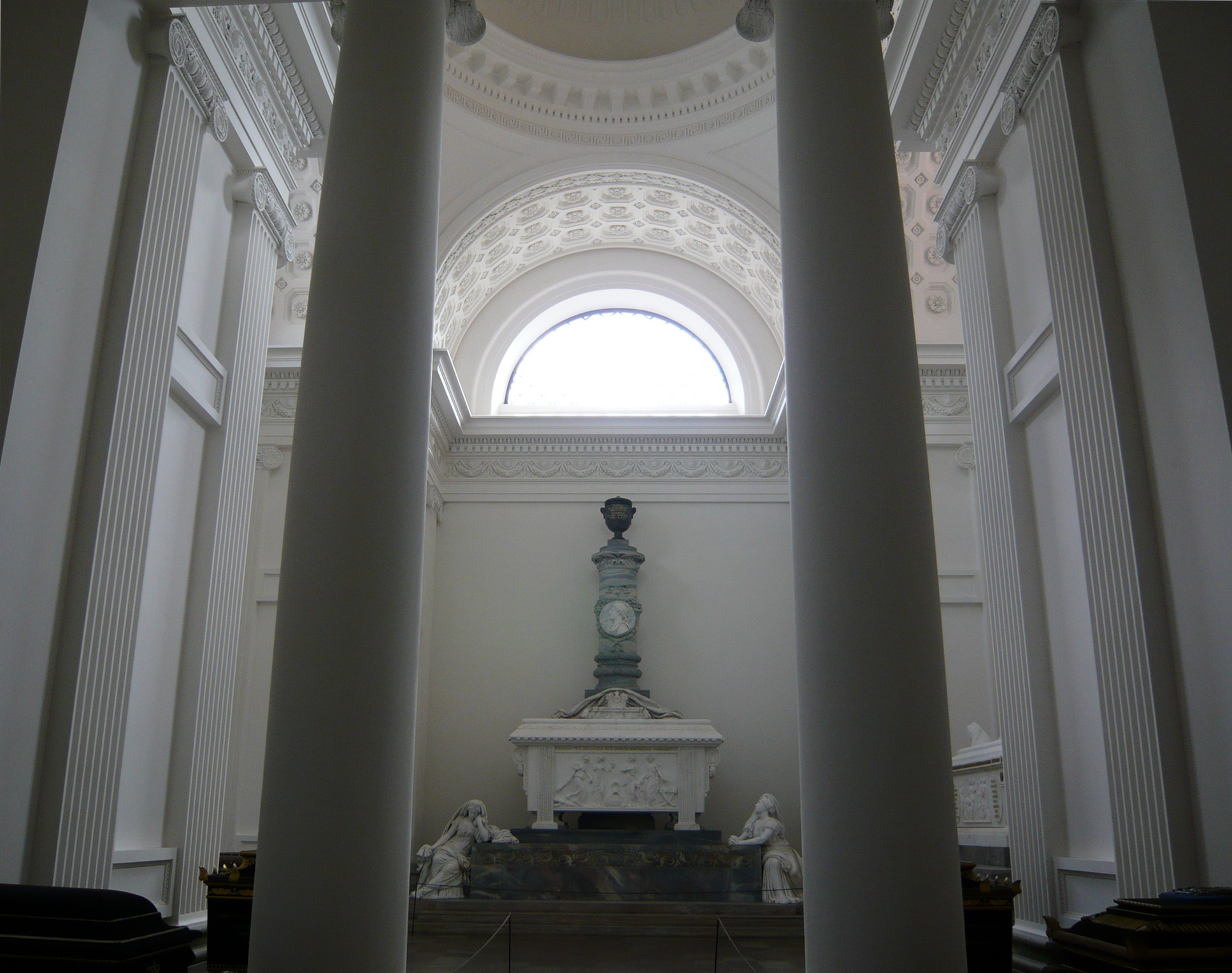
Interior of Frederick V's Chapel

Consisting of two chapels in neoclassical style, the construction spanned 51 years (1774–1825) and required the removal of a previous existing chapel, the Chapel of Our Lady.

Construction of the chapel was started by Caspar Frederik Harsdorff in 1774, possibly using early sketches made during his travels to Rome 1762–1764, but due to a lack of funding the work was suspended in 1779. It was resumed by his apprentice Christian Frederik Hansen in 1820 and completed in 1825. The chapel consists of a vestibule with two adjoining rooms on the north and south sides, usually referred to as Christian VI's chapel, and a domed cruciform-shaped hall, Frederick V's chapel. While the interior of the building had classical, whitewashed walls, the exterior retained the red brick characteristic of the rest of the cathedral.

When the chapel was inaugurated in September 1825, coffins that had been temporarily stored in Christian IV's chapel were moved to the new chapel, and as members of the royal family died, more were added. This led to the chapel, which had been designed for five marble sarcophagi, holding upwards of 17 coffins in 1912. However, the addition of Christian IX's chapel, the removal of some coffins to the crypts, and a rearrangement of the coffins, led to the present situation where only 12 coffins and sarcophagi are present. It has however led to confusion, as some of the coffins have not been arranged in the pairs which correspond to the relationships that existed during their lifetimes.

The chapel shows a gradual trend in moving from grand marble sarcophagi to more simple, velvet-covered coffins, and in the case of Frederick VII, a wooden coffin.

==== Christian IX's chapel ====
When the Constitution of Denmark was revised in 1915, the Folketing decided to honour the royal family, granting King Christian X's wish, by constructing a new chapel at the cathedral, dedicated to the House of Glücksburg which had held the throne since Christian IX became king in 1863. The chapel was designed by then cathedral architect, Andreas Clemmensen.

Construction of the chapel, overseen by a master builder Schledermann, began in 1919 and was completed in 1924, built in a Byzantine Revival style, with a Roman inspiration. Built as an extension of the northwestern weaponporch, which then ceased to exist as an independent building, the chapel is cruciform with grey walls and a domed roof. Upon its completion, there was a heavy debate in the Danish newspapers, with some believing that the chapel was completely removed from the prevailing style of the cathedral.

In the northern arm stands the double sarcophagus of Christian IX and his Queen Louise. Designed by Hack Kampmann, the sarcophagus was originally to have stood in the eastern arm of Frederick V's chapel. Surrounding the sarcophagus are three statues of female figures, designed by Edvard Eriksen. The statues are named "Grief", "Memory", and "Love" and were cut from Italian Carrara marble. The statue of "Grief" bears a notable resemblance to the statue of the Little Mermaid in Copenhagen, which is not without reason. Eriksen had created the statue of the Little Mermaid in 1911, two years before he created the statues in the chapel, and his wife Eline Eriksen was model for both. In the western arm stands the double sarcophagus of Frederik VIII and his Queen Louise, designed by Utzon-Frank. The eastern arm houses the simple marble coffins of Christian X and his Queen Alexandrine. The coffins were designed by Kaare and Naur Klint, made from Norwegian marble, and have a stylized Dannebrog covering the lid and sides.

Following the death of Maria Feodorovna in 1928, and following a short ceremony in the Alexander Nevsky Church in Copenhagen and a Russian Orthodox ceremony in Roskilde, the coffin of the dowager empress was placed in the chapel close to the tomb of her parents and brother and sister-in-law. In 1957, the coffin was placed in the crypt under the chapel, until September 2006, when it was returned to Russia. It had been the wish of the dowager empress to be buried when possible next to her husband Alexander III in the Peter and Paul Cathedral. This was possible after extensive negotiations between Queen Margrethe II and President Vladimir Putin.

Following Frederik IX's death in 1972, his coffin was placed in the chapel, draped with his Royal Standard, guarded by three silver lions from the Danish Crown Regalia, and flanked by a pair of candelabra in the shape of anchors. After the King's coffin was buried in 1985, only the candelabra remain in the chapel.

==== St Andrew's Chapel and St Bridget's Chapel ====
These two chapels, on the north side of the cathedral, are the only remnants of the many medieval chapels that were attached to the original cathedral. St Andrew's chapel was constructed in 1396, and St Bridget's in 1485.

St Andrew's chapel was completely redecorated in 2010 by artist Peter Brandes, who provided a new altarpiece as well as a latticework separating the chapel from the nave. It is the intention of the parochial church council that in the future the chapel will provide a more intimate setting for some of the church functions in the cathedral, such as weddings or baptisms. The chapel has its own small organ for these services.

Since the Reformation, St Bridget's chapel has mainly been used to store various items of church inventory from Catholic times, no longer needed in the Lutheran era. These include the three-seated celebrant's chair, the cantor's chair, and the canons' letter box. The chapel also has the oldest gravestone in the cathedral, dating back to ca. 1250. Queen Margrethe II has chosen St Birgitte's Chapel as the future burial site for herself with a sarcophagus created by artist Bjørn Nørgaard. The sarcophagus is finished and installed, but is covered until the death of the former sovereign.

=== Frederik IX's burial site ===
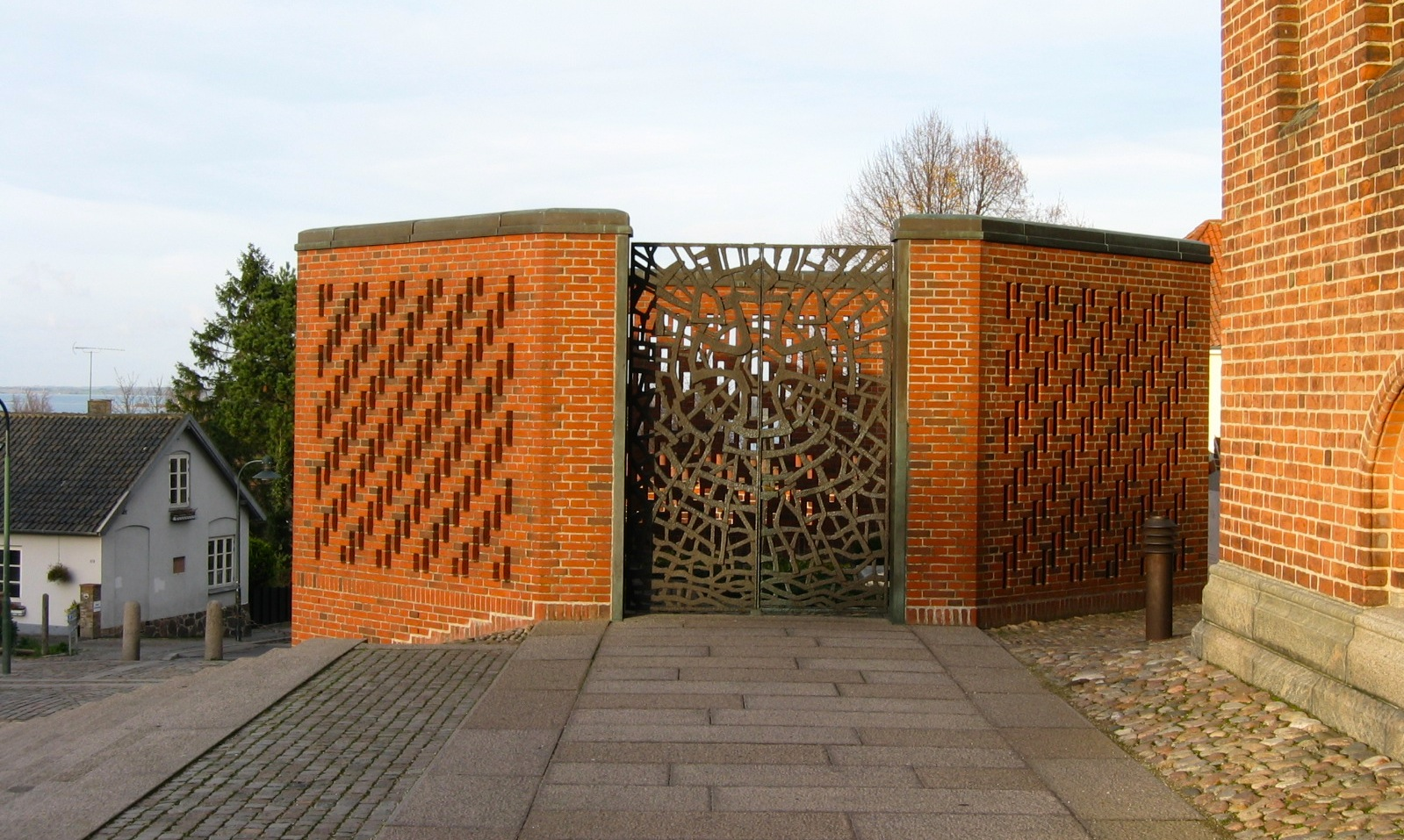
Frederik IX's Burial Site

Opened on 23 September 1985, it was the first burial site outside of the cathedral itself. The reason for the construction was twofold: it had been Frederik IX's wish to be buried outside the cathedral, in view of Roskilde Fjord (the King was a keen sailor and closely connected to the navy), and in any case there was no space left in the chapel of Christian IX. It was only on the King's death in January 1972 that debate was opened on how his wish could be granted. A meeting was held in May of the same year, involving the municipality, the parochial church council, the National Museum of Denmark, and a foundation for building and landscaping culture. In 1974 a discussion paper was presented, which spelled out how the area would be preserved and the new burial site established. There was some opposition from members of the parochial council, who insisted that the tradition of burying monarchs inside the cathedral be upheld. The zoning plan for the area was finished in 1982 and work on the burial site could begin.

The burial site was designed by architect Vilhelm Wohlert in cooperation with Inger and Johannes Exner, and consists of a simple, uncovered brick octagon with a bronze gate designed by Sven Havsteen-Mikkelsen. The gravestone was cut from Greenlandic granite by sculptor Erik Heide, though the grave was not sealed permanently until the burial of Queen Ingrid in 2000. At the wish of Queen Ingrid, the grounds of the burial site are covered in wild vines and plants from throughout the kingdom.

== Royal burials ==
=== Choir ===
- Margrethe I (d. 1412): immediately behind the high altar

=== Piers flanking the apse ===
- Harald Bluetooth (d. 985–986): supposedly buried in the northwestern pier, but no grave or remains have been found
- Sweyn II Estridsen (d. 1076) in the southeastern pier

Estrid Svendsdatter (d. between 1057 & 1073) was widely believed to have been buried in the northeastern pier, but a DNA test in 2003 dispelled the myth as the remains belonged to a woman much too young to be Estrid Svendsdatter. The new theory is that the sign on the pier refers to Margareta Hasbjörnsdatter, who was also known as Estrid and who married Harald III Hen, the son of Sweyn Estridsen. In the southwestern pillar lie the remains of two bishops, Asser and William.

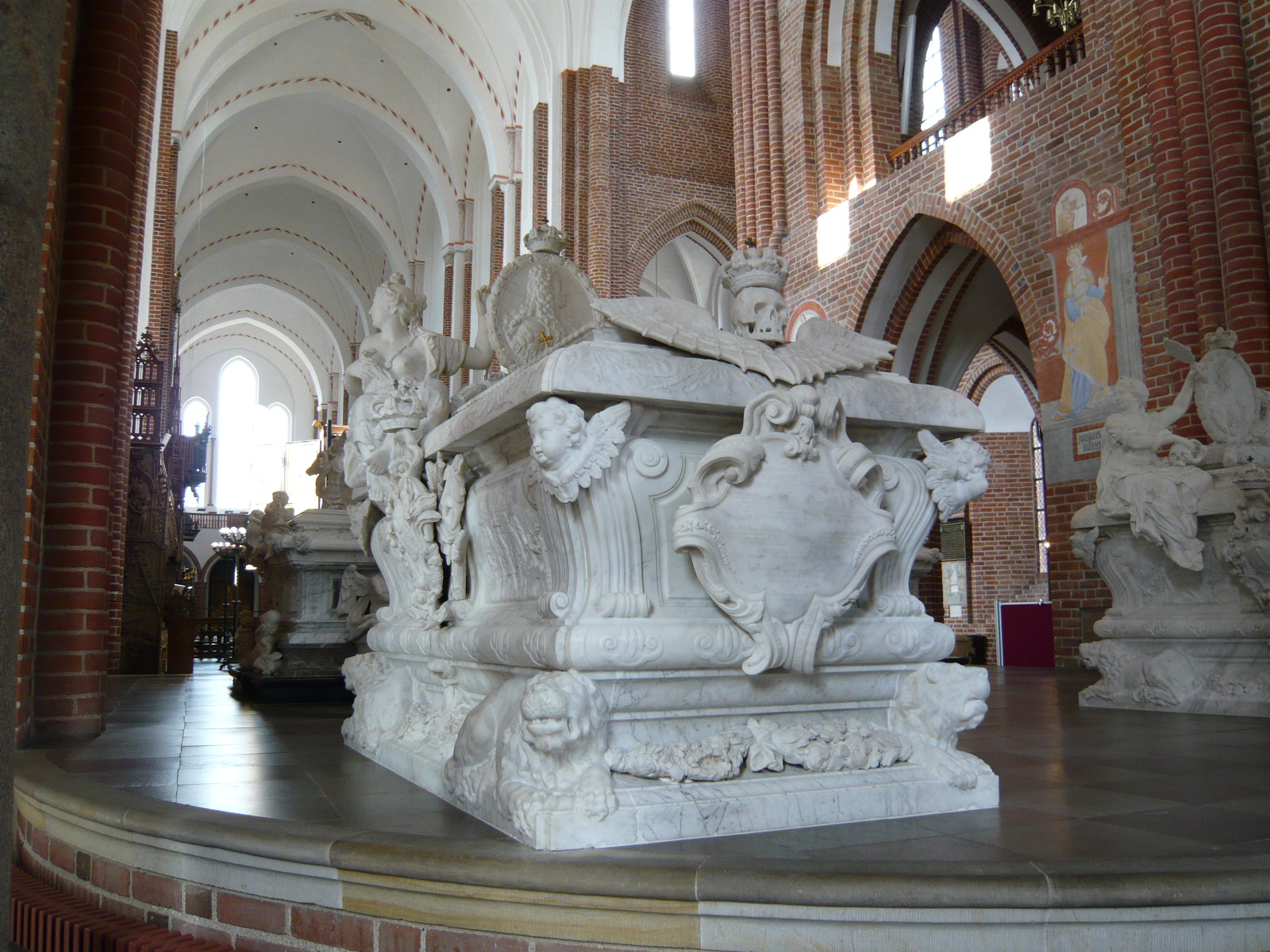
Sarcophagus of Christian V (1646–1699)

=== Apse ===
- Christopher III of Bavaria (d. 1448)
- Christian V (d. 1699) and Queen Charlotte Amalie of Hesse-Cassel (d. 1714)
- Frederick IV (d. 1730) and Queen Louise of Mecklenburg-Güstrow (d. 1721)

=== Chapel of the Magi (Christian I's Chapel) ===
- Christian I (d. 1481) and Queen Dorothea of Brandenburg (d. 1495)
- Christian III (d. 1559) and Queen Dorothea of Saxe-Lauenburg (d. 1571)
- Frederick II (d. 1588) and Queen Sophia of Mecklenburg-Güstrow (d. 1631)

=== Frederick V's chapel ===
- Christian VI (d. 1746) and Queen Sophie Magdalene of Brandenburg-Kulmbach (d. 1770)
- Frederick V (d. 1766) and Queens: Louise of Great Britain (d. 1751) and Juliana Maria of Brunswick-Wolfenbüttel (d. 1796)
- Christian VII (d. 1808)
- Frederick VI (d. 1839) and Queen Marie of Hesse-Kassel (d. 1852)
- Christian VIII (d. 1848) and Queen Caroline Amalie of Schleswig-Holstein-Sonderburg-Augustenburg (d. 1881)
- Frederick VII (d. 1863)

=== Christian IV's chapel ===
- Christian, Prince Elect (d. 1647)
- Christian IV (d. 1648) and Queen Anne Catherine of Brandenburg (d. 1612)
- Frederick III (d. 1670) and Queen Sophie Amalie of Brunswick-Calenberg (d. 1685)

=== Christian IX's chapel ===
- Christian IX (1818–1906) and Queen Louise of Hesse-Kassel (1817–1898)
- Frederik VIII (1843–1912) and Queen Lovisa of Sweden-Norway (1851–1926)
- Christian X (1870–1947) and Queen Alexandrine of Mecklenburg-Schwerin (1879–1952)

=== Frederik IX's burial site ===
- Frederik IX (1899–1972) and Queen Ingrid of Sweden (1910–2000)

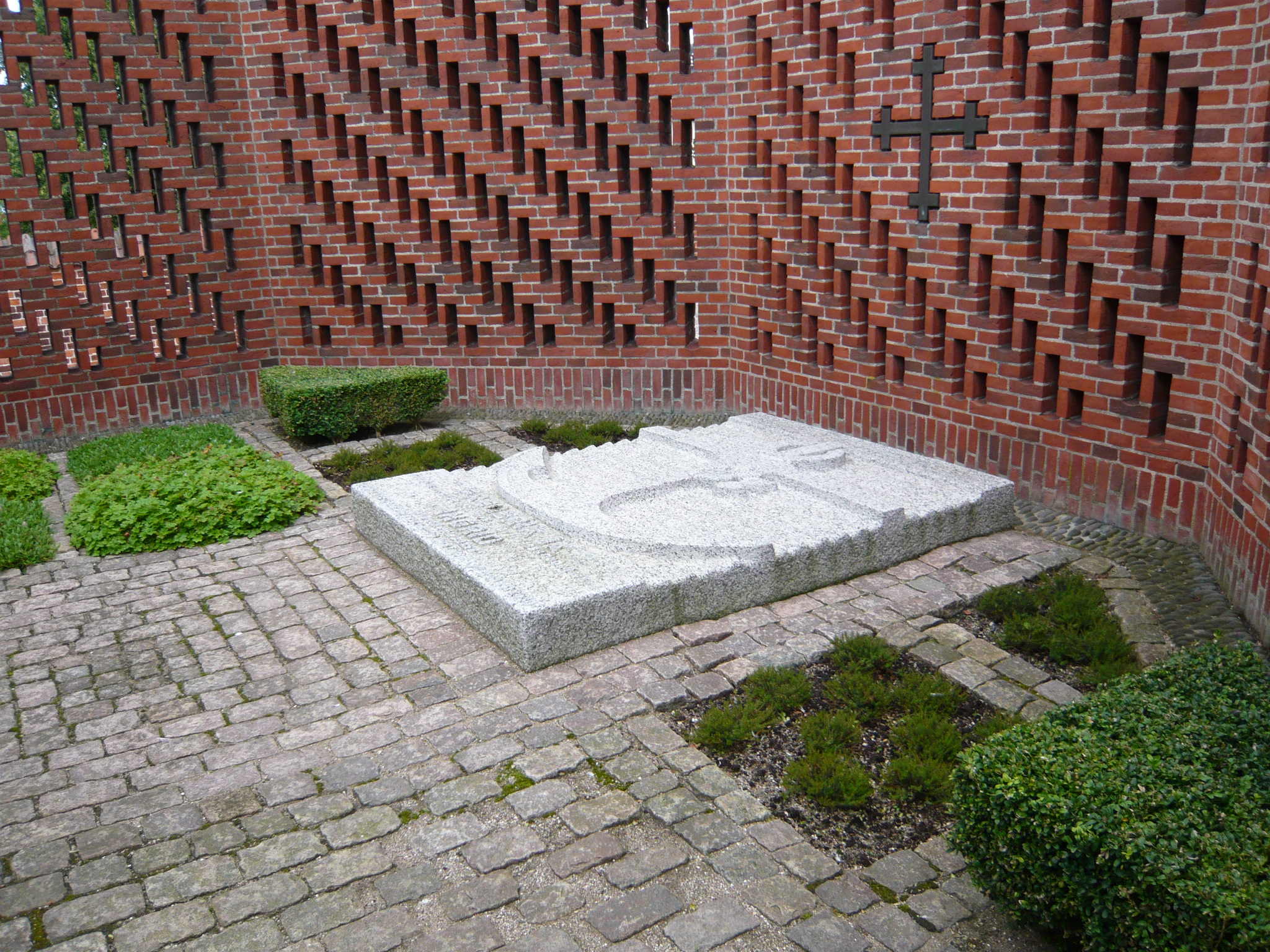
Gravestone of Frederik IX and Queen Ingrid

=== Maria Feodorovna's burial site ===
- Maria Feodorovna (1847–1928), Danish princess and Empress of Russia as spouse of Tsar Alexander III was buried here from her death in 1928 until she was reinterred in Russia through a number of ceremonies, between 23 and 28 September 2006. Since then, her remains rest next to her husband's in Saints Peter and Paul Cathedral, Saint Petersburg.

== Boys' choir ==
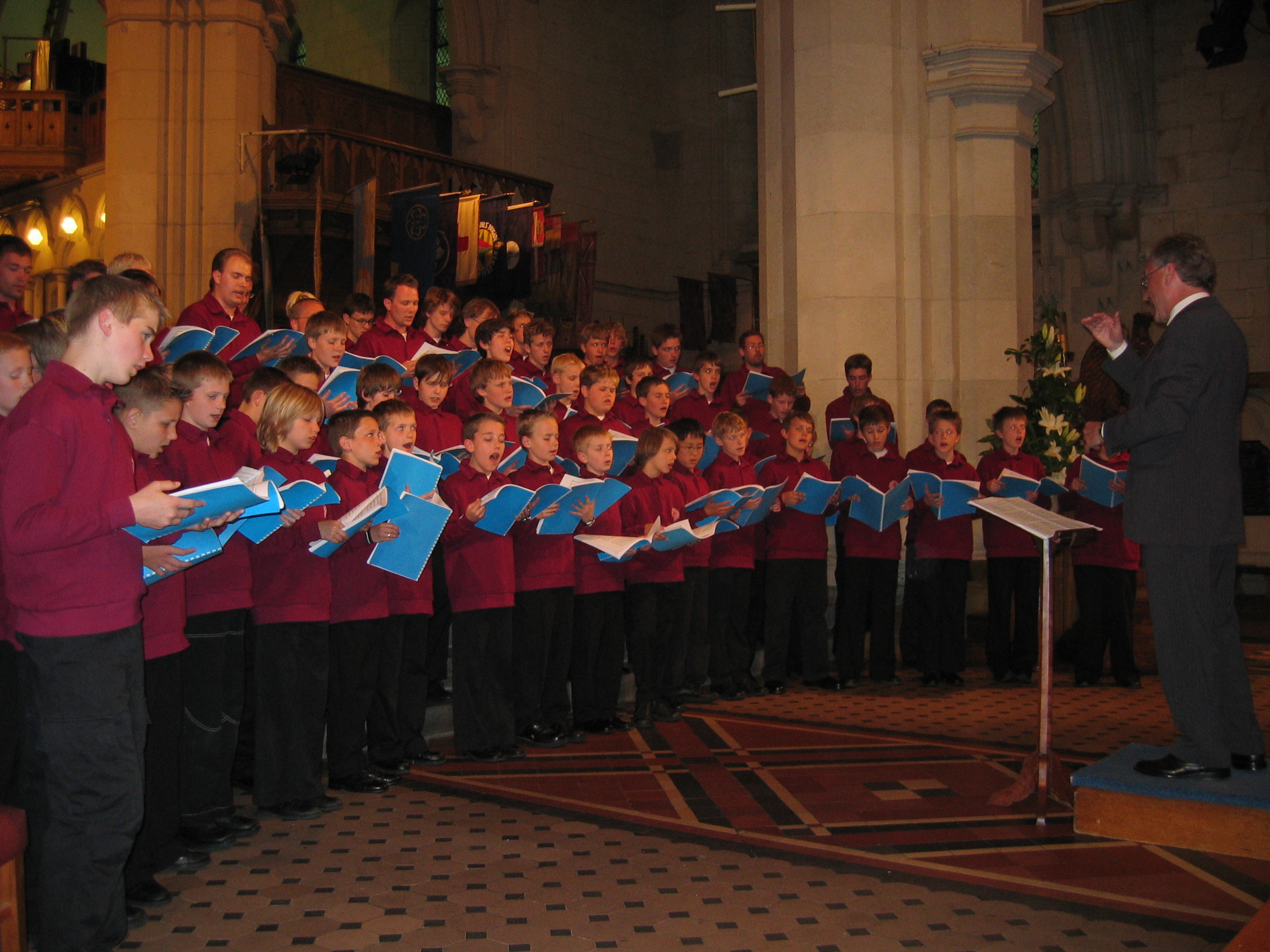
The Boys' Choir

Since 1987, the cathedral has been home to one of Denmark's leading boys' choirs, the Roskilde Cathedral Boys' Choir. The choir is a key resource in parish youth work. All choristers go to normal school but meet 2–3 times a week to rehearse. Every second year the choir travels abroad to different destinations, such as New Zealand, Scandinavia, England, Greenland, France, and Canada.

== Organ ==
In 1554 a new organ built by Herman Raphaelis (also known as Hermann Rodensteen) was donated to the cathedral for services. It was updated/enlarged in 1611, 1654, the 1690s (?), 1833, 1926 and the 1950s. During the 1980s tonal and technical problems became apparent. A thorough investigation—and the presence in the instrument of a considerable quantity of 16- and 17th-century pipework—led to the decision to re-create a classical Danish organ of the 17th century. This work was carried out by Marcussen & Søn and completed in 1991.

== See also ==
- Roskilde Cathedral School
- List of Gothic Cathedrals in Europe
