= Caspar Fincke =

Bohemian-Danish court smith

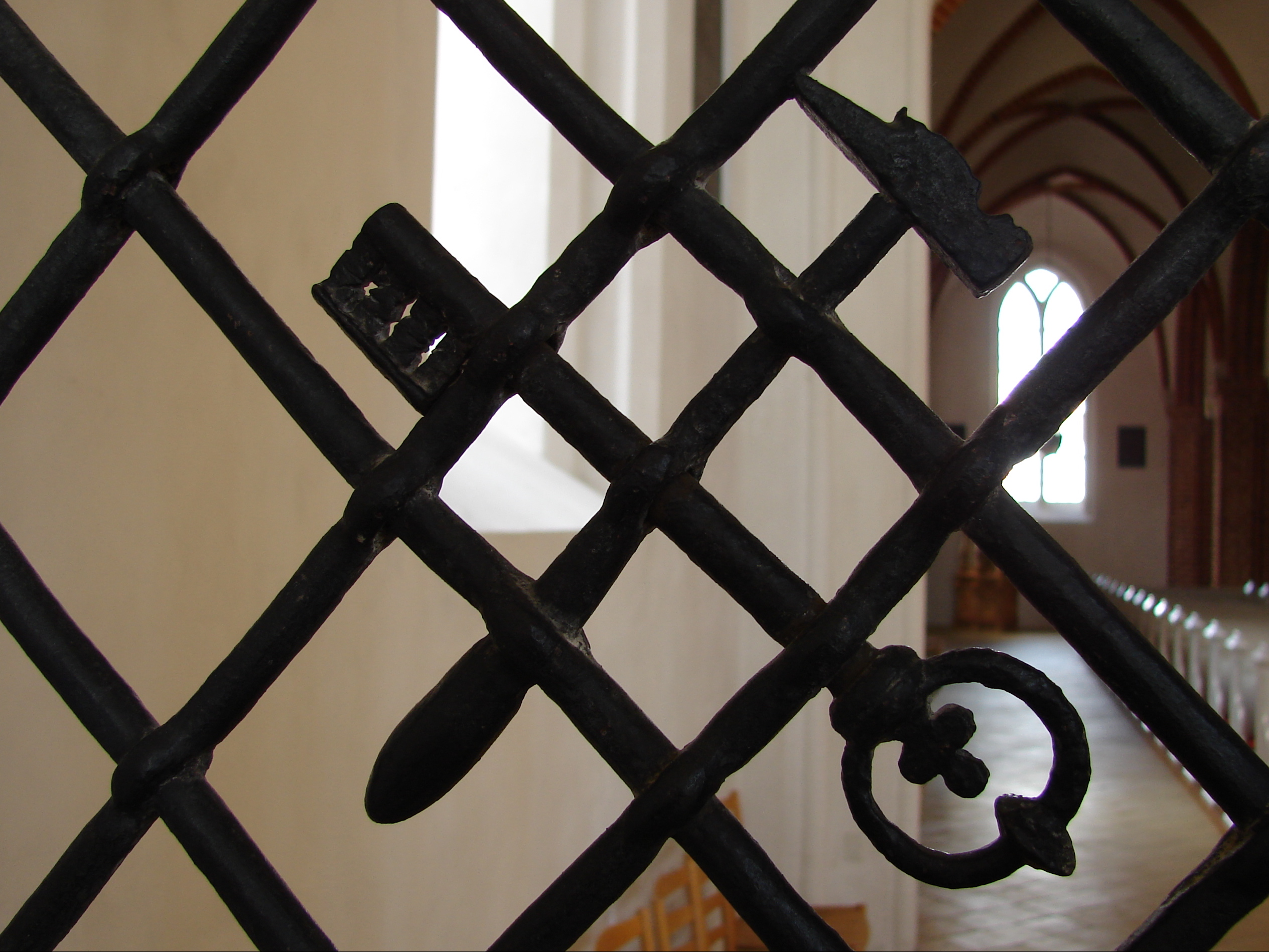
Casker Fincke's mark in the Church of Our Lady in Nyborg.

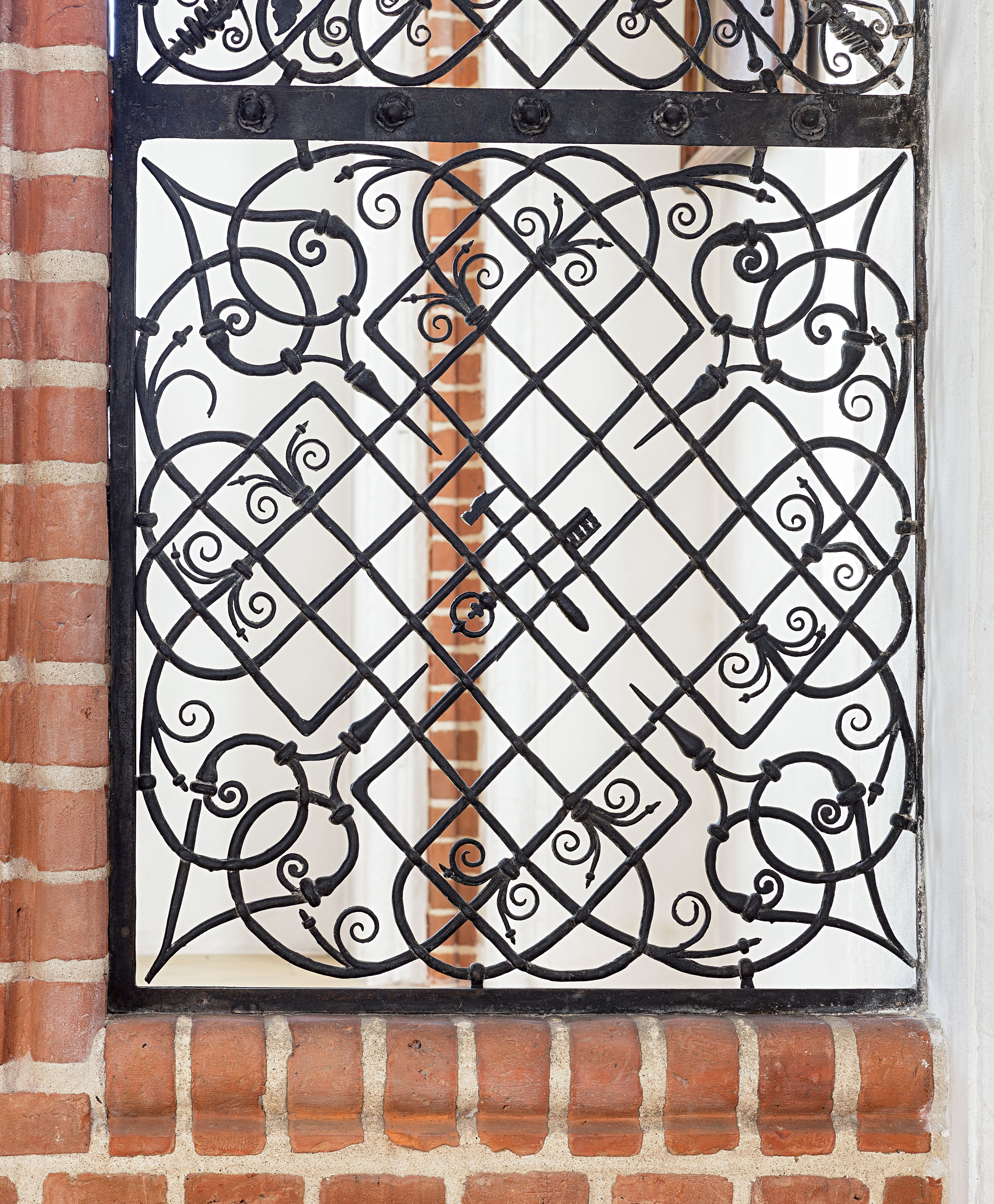
Fincke's mark in Karen Krabbe's former chapel.

Caspar Fincke (1584 – 9 February 1655) was a Bohemian-Danish court smith during the reigns of Christian IV and Frederick III. He has created some of the finest decorative metalwork for some of the most prominent buildings of the time, including Frederiksborg Castle, Kronborg Castle Christian IV's Chapel in Roskilde Cathedral and a number of churches around the country.

== Early life and education ==
Fincke was born in Bohemia. He came to Denmark in an early age. He was trained as a smith before moving to Denmark.

== Career ==
In 1610, he was employed at Kronborg Rifle Factory. In 1612, he was admitted to Helsingør Smiths Guild. His workshop was located at the corner of Sankt Annagade and Kongensgade. The latter street was for a while known as Caspar Finckes Stræde. In c. 1615, he created some of the decorative wrought iron work for Frederiksborg Castle. By 1618–18, he had already created his elaborate wrought iron gate for Christian IV's Chapel in Roskilde Cathedral. It features the inscription "CF. bin ich genant, diser Arbeit bin ich bekant". In 1622–30, he was back at Hammermøllen in Hellebæk. In 1631, he was appointed as court smith at Copenhagen Castle. Frederiksborg Castle and Kronborg Castle. The railing on the observation platform of the Round Tower in Copenhagen is also attributed to him. He also contributed with decorative metalwork for a number of churches around the country. Many of his works incorporate his mark, a hammer crossed with a key.

== Personal life and legacy ==
He married twice. His first wife was Sofie Berendsdatter (c. 1595 - 2 December 1624). His second wife was Karen Andersdatter (died 1767). In 1650, Frederick III appointed his son Morten Finckas his successor.

== Gallery ==
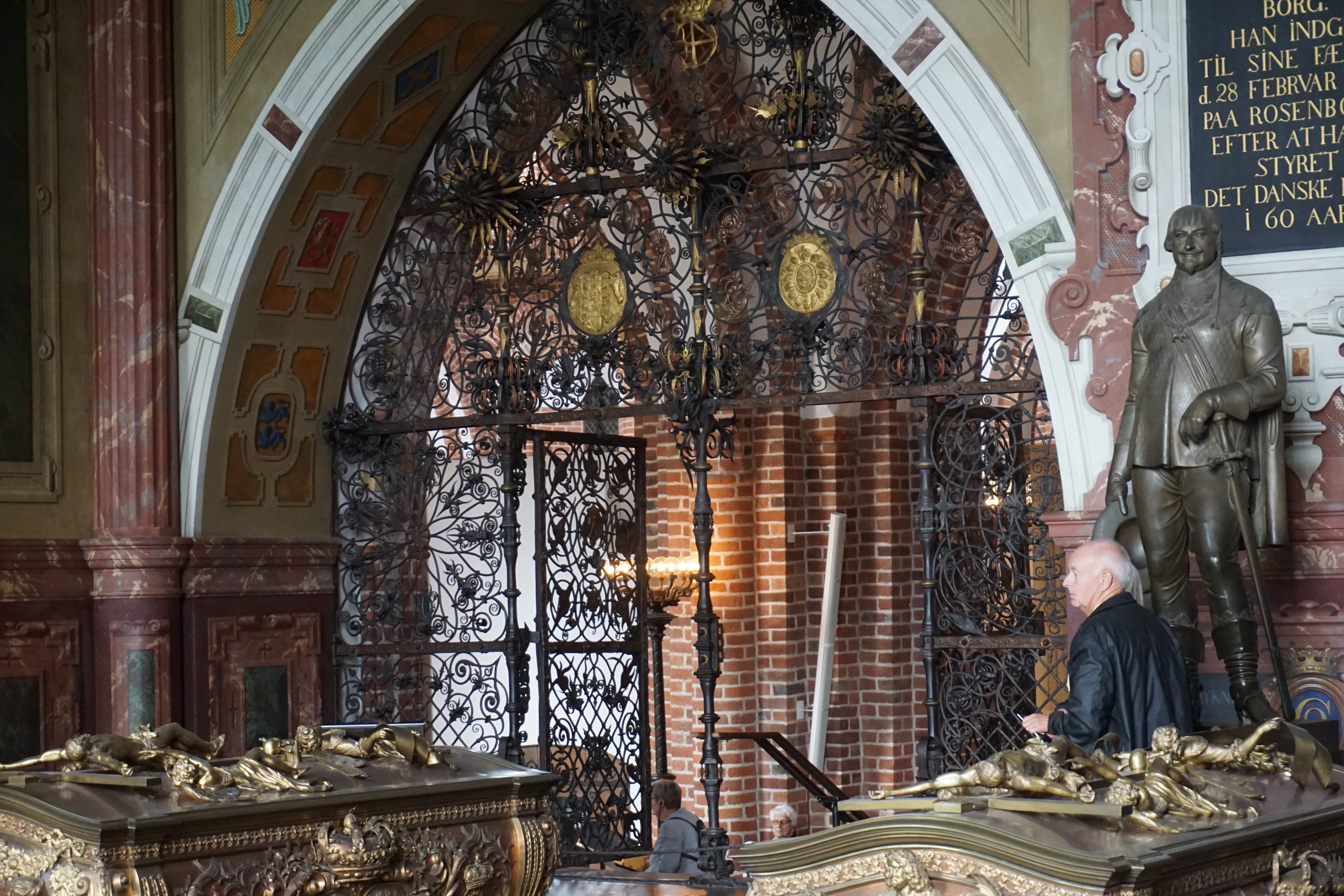
Christian IV's Cjapel, Toskilde Cathedral

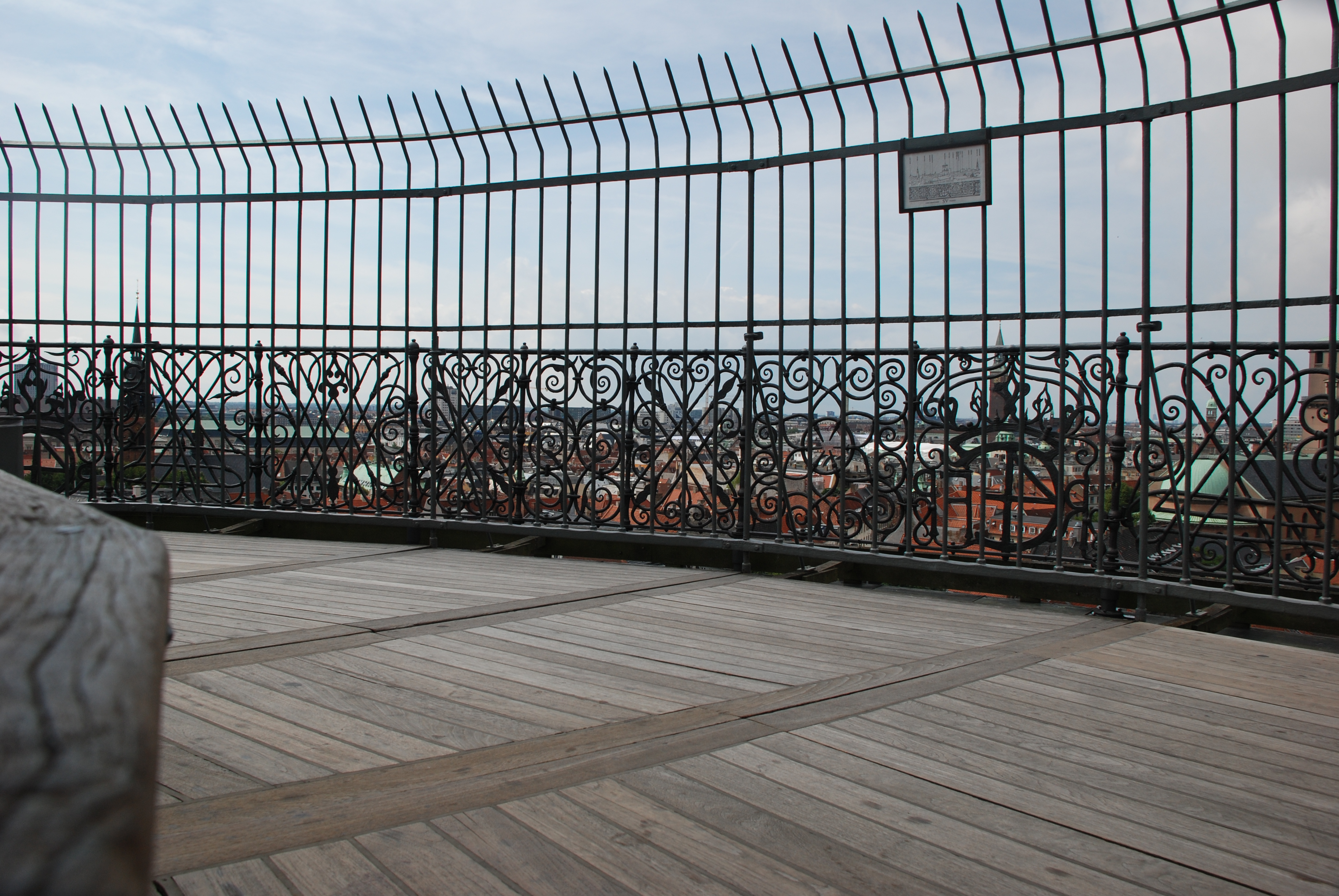
The observation platform of the Round Tower in Copenhagen.

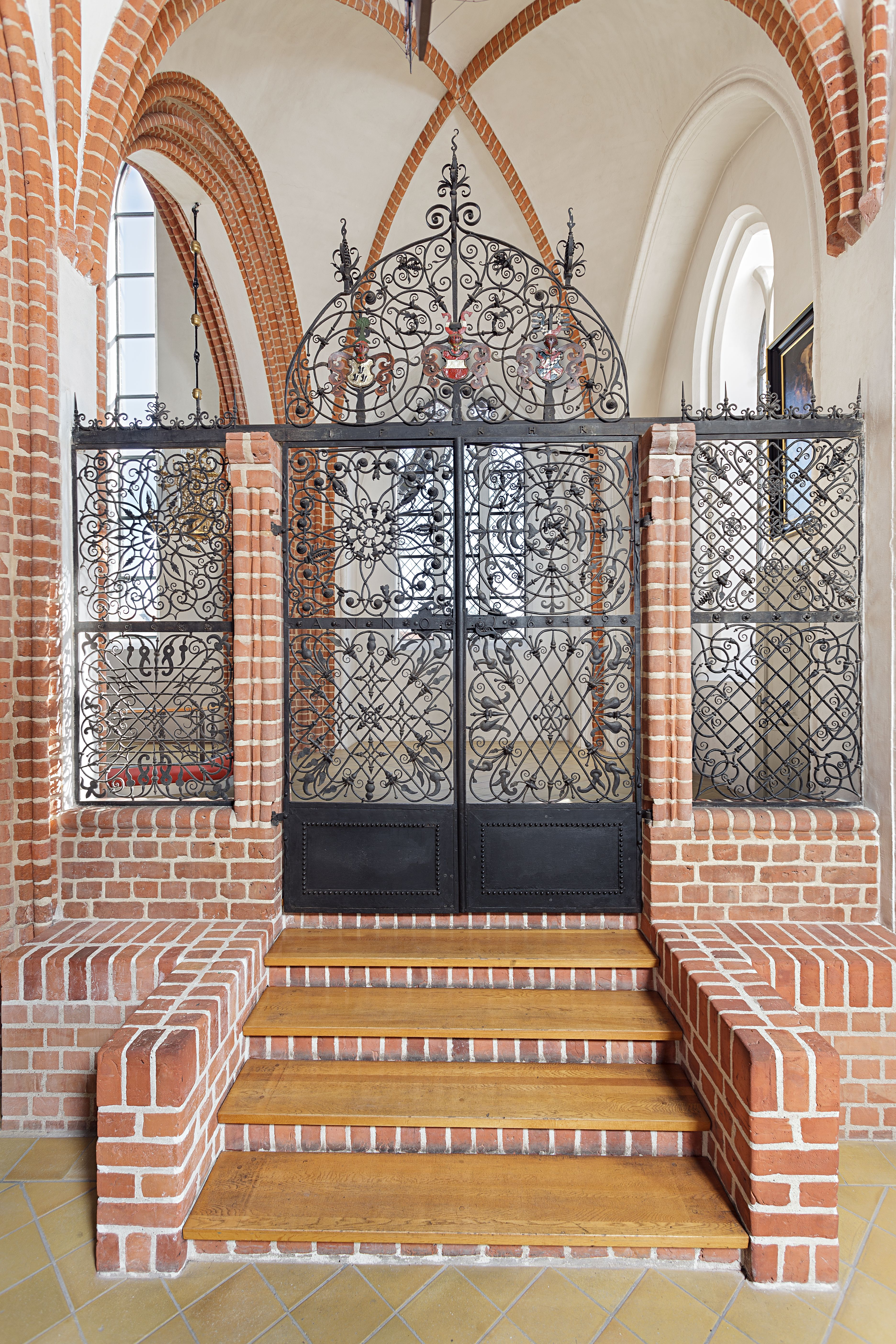
The door to Karen Krabbe's former chapel in the Church of Our Lady in Nyborg.

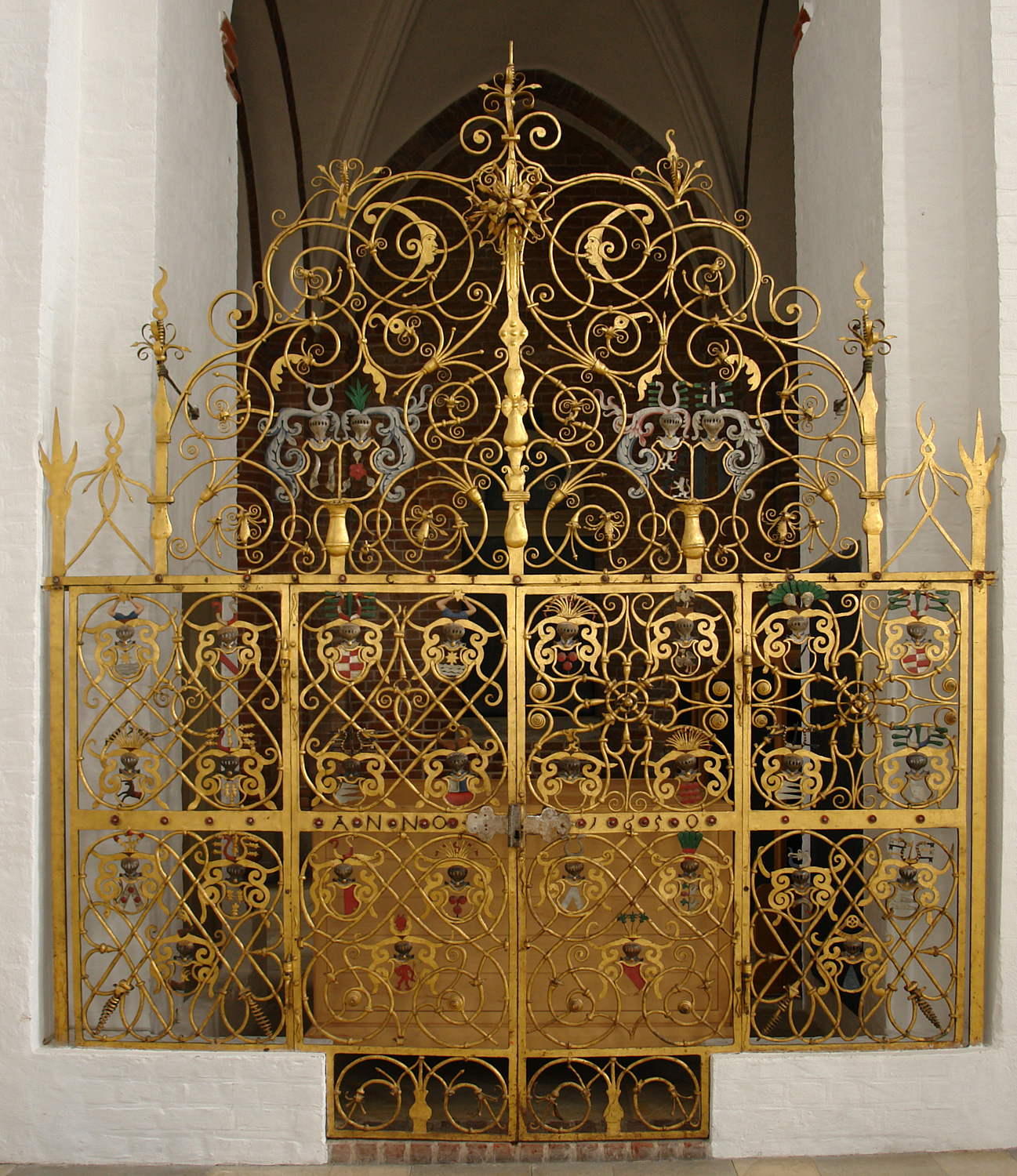
Door in Aarhus Cathedral.
