= Lorenz van Steenwinckel =

Flemish-Danish architect and sculptor

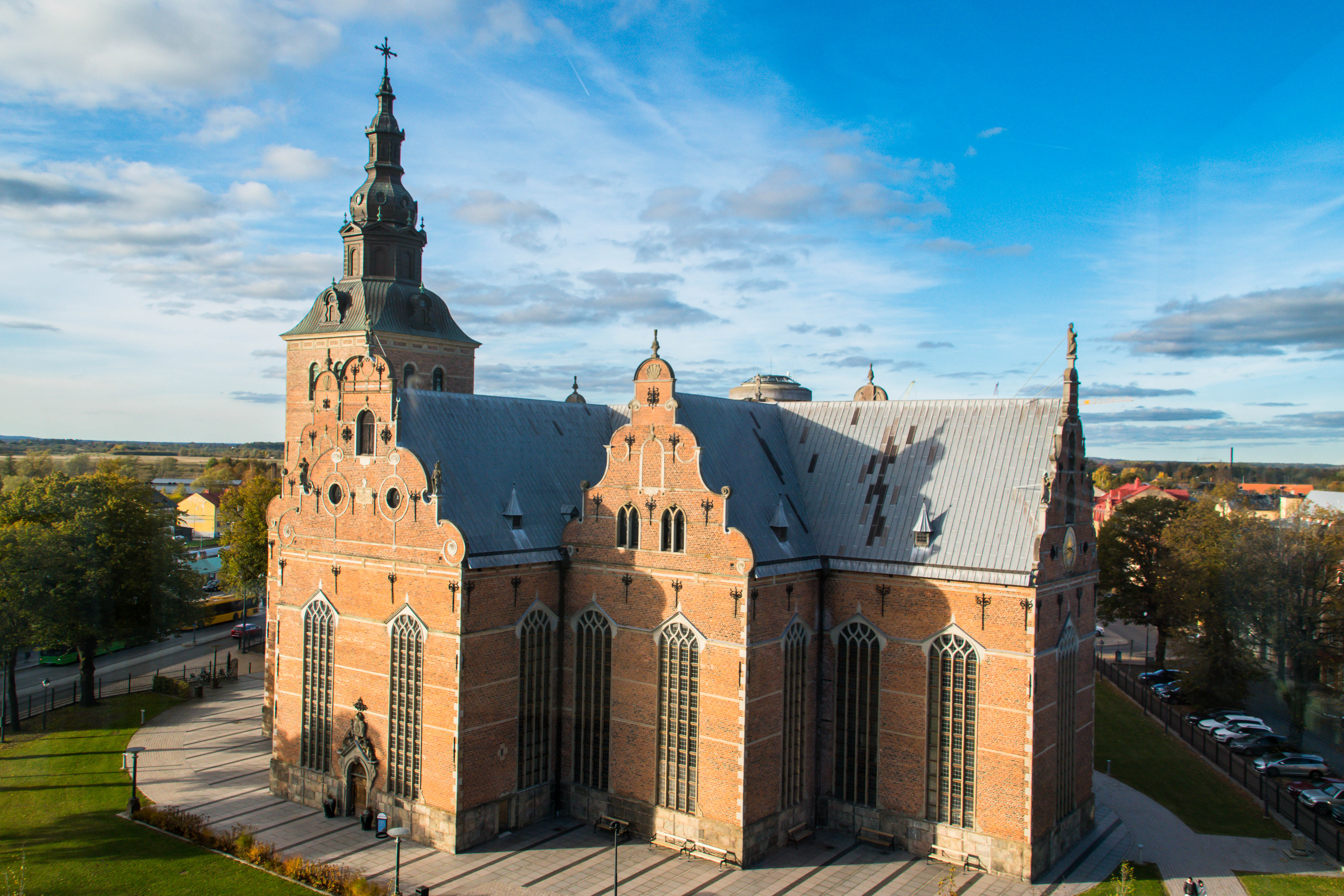
Trinity Church, Kristianstad

Lorenz van Steenwinckel (1585–1619) was a Flemish-Danish architect and sculptor, son of Hans van Steenwinckel the Elder and brother of Hans van Steenwinckel the Younger. From 1613, he was responsible for numerous projects commissioned by Christian IV. Christian IV's Chapel at Roskilde Cathedral and the Stock Exchange in Copenhagen were among his many projects underway when he died in 1619, only 34 years old. The projects were completed by his brother Hans van Steenwinckel.
