= Queen Blanche =

Queen Blanche may refer to:

== Queens regnant ==
- Blanche I of Navarre (1387–1441)
- Blanche II of Navarre (1424–1464)

== Queens consort ==
- Blanche of Castile (1188–1252), queen consort of France
- Blanche of Artois (1248–1302), queen consort of Navarre
- Blanche of Anjou (1289–1310), queen consort of Aragon
- Blanche of Namur (1320–1363), queen consort of Sweden and Norway
- Blanche of Navarre (1331–1398), queen consort of France

== Objects ==
- Queen Blanche (painting), painting by Albert Edelfelt (1877)
