= Bengt Algotsson =

Swedish noble (died 1360)

Bengt Algotsson (Latin: Benedictus, d. 1360) was a Swedish nobleman and a favourite of King Magnus Eriksson. A member of the high nobility with royal ancestry, he rose quickly in rank. After serving as a squire on Magnus's crusade against Novgorod in 1350, he was knighted in 1351, appointed to the Privy Council in 1352, and made duke of Finland and Halland around 1353–55. He is the only non-royal in Swedish history to have been granted a ducal title.

His extraordinary advancement and the king's anti-aristocratic policies and increased taxation, enforced by Bengt, provoked strong hostility among the other magnates. They rebelled in 1356, forcing Bengt into exile and raising Magnus's son Erik as co-king. Although Magnus was compelled to swear that Bengt would never return, he re-entered Scania in 1360 and was killed.

== Ancestry ==
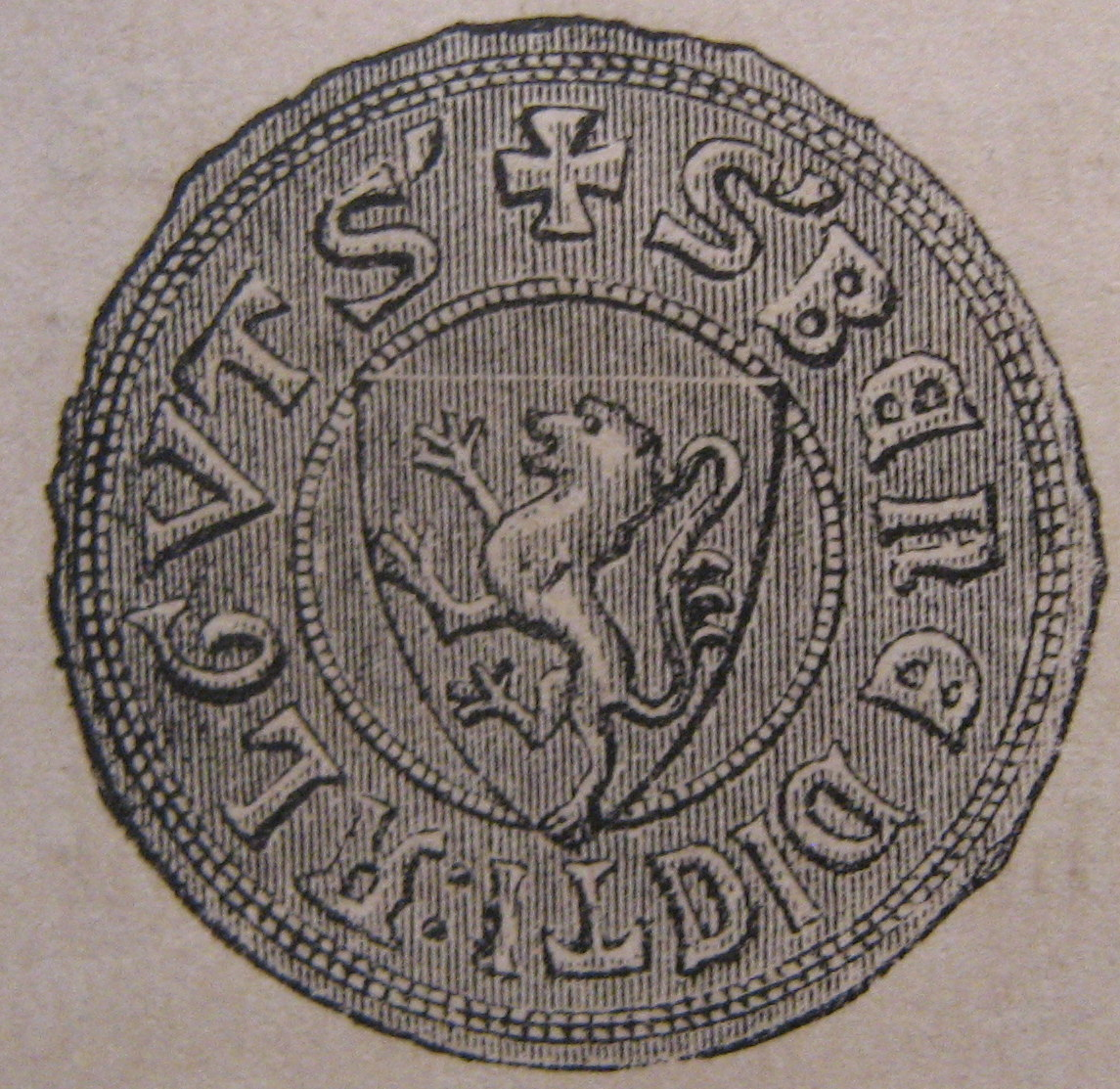
Bengt Algotsson's seal

Bengt Algotsson belonged to the highest ranks of the Swedish nobility. Bengt's mother was the unnamed daughter of the knight Tolf Petersson. Tolf's wife, Ingegärd, was the daughter of Svantepolk Knutsson and a descendant of both the Sverker dynasty and the Danish king Valdemar II.

On his father's side, Bengt belonged to the Bjälbo family and bore a coat of arms featuring a rampant lion. His father, Algot Brynolfsson, was the son of Brynolf Bengtsson, who was likely a son of Bengt Hafridsson, a lawman in Västergötland. Neither Bengt's father nor his grandfather held significant offices, although his uncle was appointed marsk in 1331.

Bengt was also related to Saint Birgitta, who was his father's cousin. Birgitta's eldest daughter also married Bengt's brother Knut in 1355. Despite these close family ties, Birgitta viewed Bengt with marked hostility.

== Rise to power ==
Bengt Algotsson participated in Magnus Eriksson's crusade against Novgorod in 1350 as a squire, and was knighted after it. From 1352 he is known to have had a seat in the kingdom's Privy Council. In about 1353, Bengt was created Duke of Finland and Halland by the King Magnus. The reasons for this rapid rise in rank are not known. Propaganda from Saint Birgitta's circle and the aristocracy that opposed Magnus claimed that Bengt was elevated due to the personal attraction of Magnus and Queen Blanka to him.

In reality, the motivations were likely economic and related to Magnus's efforts to centralize power and reduce the influence of the secular and ecclesiastical nobility. To finance his crusade against Novgorod, Magnus had secured a papal loan, but when the Black Death struck in the mid-1350s, tax revenues plummeted, leaving the king unable to repay the debt. The loan had been guaranteed by the bishops and aristocracy, who could face excommunication if the loan was not repaid. By granting Finland to Bengt, who was not a guarantor, Magnus shielded the region's revenue from the creditors but angered the aristocracy. To increase the tax revenue, Bengt's bailiffs tried to restrict free peasant trade by enforcing the new city law that permitted trade only in specific cities.

According to tradition preserved in Vadstena Abbey, Bishop Hemmingus of Åbo sought to prevent Bengt's appointment as Duke of Finland. However, Bengt's seal from 1355 includes the phrase Secretum Benedicti ducis Osterlandiarum et Hallandi, where "Österland" refers to Finland, indicating that any such resistance had been overcome by that time.

In 1355, Bengt confiscated the properties of the Archdiocese of Lund upon the death of Archbishop Peder Jensen, which angered his successor Jacob Nielsen. This action is recorded in the Chronica Sialandie, which states: per ducem Benedictum (imo maledictum!) et prefectum Schanie [...] omnimode sunt confiscata. According to Michael Nordberg, this passage does not indicate that Bengt served as governor of Scania, although some researchers have interpreted it that way.

== Conflict and exile ==
In 1356, a rebellion erupted against Duke Bengt and King Magnus, with Magnus's eldest son Erik Magnusson as the figurehead. On 17 October, Erik issued an open letter from Kalmar to the inhabitants of the Diocese of Linköping, urging them to help him fight the hated Duke Bengt. Although the rebellion was also directed against King Magnus, he was not mentioned in the letter. The rebellion proceeded quickly. The army arrived in Lund on 30 October and then proceeded to Halland. There, they captured the Varberg Fortress and forced Bengt into exile. Magnus was forced to give most of his realm to his son, who obtained control over Scania, southern Halland, Finland, and some other parts of Sweden. The division of the realm was formalized in Jönköping on 28 April 1357. Bengt's elder brother Knut Algotsson was also exiled, but was later allowed to return.

Erik Magnusson's discontent stemmed from his lack of power. In 1355, his younger brother Haakon was declared of age and became the sovereign ruler of Norway. Meanwhile, Erik remained powerless in Sweden, where his father continued to rule. Since Magnus was also only 39 years old, so no change was expected in the near future. Magnus's decision to appoint Bengt Algotsson as Duke of Halland and Finland only added to the resentment because the ducal title had traditionally been reserved for members of the royal house.

Erik's revolt drew support from Swedish and Scanian magnates who opposed Magnus and Bengt for various political and financial reasons. He was supported by five of Sweden's seven bishops, who had guaranteed Magnus's papal loan. Tensions between the king and the clerical frälse escalated further when Magnus abolished their tax immunity in 1352. Among Erik's supporters was also Jacob Nielsen, archbishop of Lund, whose properties Bengt had confiscated in 1356.

When Erik died suddenly in 1359, Magnus regained his kingdom, but was forced to renew his oath barring Bengt from returning. Bengt Algotsson was also declared an outlaw. Nevertheless, Bengt returned to Scania in 1360 and was killed at Rönneholm Castle. Sixteenth-century genealogist Rasmus Ludvigsson identified his killers as Karl Ulfsson and Magnus Nilsson Röde. Ludvigsson recorded a legend stating that the killing was motivated by a broken betrothal to Karl's sister, Ingeborg. She was member of the Sparre family and the daughter of Ulf Ambjörnsson, the Lawspeaker of Tiohärad. Allegedly, Bengt abandoned Ingeborg after being elevated to the rank of duke. Johannes Messenius adds that Ingeborg died of a broken heart while on a pilgrimage. However, the legend is doubtful, because Ingeborg was much older than Bengt and was already a widow.

== Allegations of sodomy ==
Bengt Algotsson's rapid elevation made him a central figure in political propaganda against King Magnus. In some of her early Revelations, Saint Birgitta accused Magnus of harboring an affection for a certain knight that bordered on obsession. Historians generally identify this knight with Bengt. She asserted that Magnus loved this man "more than he loves his God, his wife, and his own soul". Later pamphlets, such as Libellus de Magno Erici rege, explicitly claimed the King neglected Queen Blanka to commit acts "against nature" with his favorite.

Modern historians interpret these accusations as political rhetoric rather than factual evidence of sexual orientation. They were utilized to portray the king as weak and unfit to rule, mirroring the political strategies used against Edward II of England. Although Bengt Algotsson was of high birth, Birgitta referred to him as a "thrall" (slave) to highlight a inversion of the social order.

== Works cited ==
- Nordberg, Michael (1995). I kung Magnus tid (in Swedish). Stockholm: Norstedt. ISBN 91-1-952122-7.
- Suvanto, Seppo (1997). "Bengt Algotinpoika (K 1360)". Kansallisbiografia (in Finnish). Suomalaisen Kirjallisuuden Seura. (available via Biografiasampo)
- Suvanto, Seppo (2000). "Eerik Maununpoika". Kansallisbiografia (via Biografiasampo) (in Finnish).
- Tunberg, S. (1922). "Bengt Algotsson". Svenskt Biografiskt Lexikon.
- Kroman, Erik (1980). Danmarks middelalderlige annaler (PDF) (in Danish). København: Selskabet for Udgivelse af Kilder til Dansk Historie. ISBN 978-87-7500-138-5.
- Annerstedt, Cl. (1904). "Bengt Algotsson". Nordisk familjebok / Uggleupplagan. 2. Armatoler - Bergsund (in Swedish). pp. 1350–1351.
- Karlsson, K.H. (1911). "Knut Algotsson". Nordisk familjebok / Uggleupplagan. 14. Kikarsikte - Kroman (in Swedish). p. 423.
- Bagerius, Henric; Ekholst, Christine (2008). "En olydig sodomit: Om Magnus Eriksson och det heteronormativa regentskapet". Scandia (in Swedish). 73 (2): 7–38.

Preceded by Valdemar Magnusson	Duke of Finland; 1353/4–1356	Succeeded by John III of Sweden
