= Beatrix of Bavaria =

Queen of Sweden from 1356 to 1359

Queen consort of Sweden
- Tenure: 1356–1359
- Died: 1359; Sweden
- Spouse: Erik Magnusson, King of Sweden
- Father: Louis V, Duke of Bavaria
- Mother: Margaret of Denmark

Beatrix of Bavaria (also of Brandenburg, of Wittelsbach; died 1359) was Queen of Sweden as the wife of King Erik Magnusson (1339–1359) who co-ruled Sweden with his father King Magnus Eriksson.

== Biography ==
Beatrix was the daughter of Margrave Louis V of Brandenburg (1315–1361), the eldest son of Holy Roman Emperor Louis IV. Her mother was Louis' first wife Margaret (1305–1340), daughter of King Christopher II of Denmark.

Sometime before October 1356, she married Erik Magnusson, who as the elder of two sons, became co-monarch after a rebellion against his father, Magnus Eriksson (1316–1374) who was monarch of both Norway and Sweden. The younger son, Haakon (1340–1380), was to become became ruler of Norway. Beatrix was queen jointly with her mother-in-law, Blanche of Namur (1320–1363).

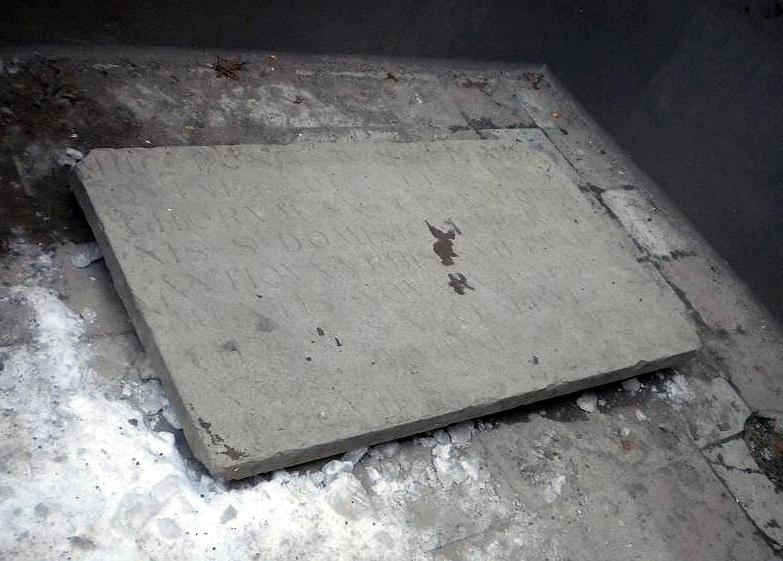
Memorial stone to burials at Black Friars' Monastery of Stockholm

Beatrix and Erik both died in 1359. It is believed that her husband died of the Black Death, and that Beatrix, who gave birth to a stillborn son, also died of plague. Some historians believe she and her son were buried at the Black Friars' Monastery of Stockholm.

Beatrix of Bavaria House of Wittelsbach Born: 1344 Died: 25 December 1359
Royal titles
Preceded by Blanche of Namur as sole queen	Queen consort of Sweden; 1356–1359 with Blanche of Namur	Succeeded by Blanche of Namur as sole queen
