= Arvid Gustavsson, Lord of Vik =

Swedish magnate

Arvid Gustavsson, Lord of Vik (died c. 1379/1380) was a medieval Swedish magnate and justiciar of Finland. His principal seat was his manor of Vik in Balingsta, Uppland. Through his paternal grandmother Ramborg Israelsdotter And, younger Arvid descended from the And family. His grandfather Arvid Gustavsson had the same name and coat of arms.

Younger Arvid Gustavsson's father was Gustav Arvidsson, knight and member of the Privy Council of Sweden, justiciar of Södermanland, whose seat probably already was Vik. Arvid's mother probably (but not certainly, because some history gives him as son of a second wife of his father, of whose existence and name there are however no contemporary evidence) was Kristina Petersdotter of the tre rutor family, daughter of Birgitta Jonsdotter, possibly of the Aspenäs family, and certainly widow of Erengisle Näskonungsson, Lord High Constable of Sweden.

The younger Arvid Gustafsson was member of the Privy Council of Sweden from 1362, and from 1366 lawspeaker of Finland, Swedish province.

His wife was Helena Magnusdotter, daughter of Birgitta Knutsdotter of the Algotssöner family and Magnus Gislason, PC, Lord of Aspnäs, who also bore spar as his Coat of Arms, and is therefore also dubbed as "Sparre" (Sparre of Aspnäs) in genealogies. Magnus Gislason's line and Gustav/Arvid line may well have been of the same origin, but there exists no evidence of that.

Helena and Arvid inherited the manor of Örby when her parents' inheritance was divided between her and her full sister (whose family received Aspnäs). Her half-sister had been the first wife of Karl Ulfsson, Lord of Tofta, thus a brother-in-law of Arvid.

Arvid and Helena had an only surviving child, daughter Margareta Arvidsdotter (died on 9 April 1415), who became their heiress. Margareta married sir Ture Bengtsson (of the Bielke, died 20 November 1414), PC, justiciar of Uppland. Their descendants inherited Vik, Örby etc., a veritable bunch of properties in Uppland, which ultimately ended to their descendants the Vasa, and its scion, the king Gustav I.

Justiciar Arvid died either in 1379 or 1380. His father's first name was given to his 7th-generation descendant who became Gustav I of Sweden and because of whom, the name Gustav has since remained in common names of Swedish royal families.

== Sources ==
- Äldre svenska frälsesläkter, by Folke Wernstedt, 1965
