= Ulvsson =

Ulvsson is a surname. Notable people with the surname include:

- Charles Ulvsson, Lord of Tofta (1320-30–1407), Swedish magnate
- Jakob Ulvsson (1430s–1521), Roman Catholic archbishop
