= Arvid Gustavsson Sparre =

Icelandic lawspeaker (1245–1317)

His Coat of Arms with the chevron

Arvid Gustavsson Sparre, born 1245 in Vik, Balingsta and died in 1317 (at Nyköping Banquet). He was Lord of Ekholmen in Veckholm, Uppland, Sweden. He had in his coat of arms a spar, for which his family has been retrospectively named in genealogies as Sparre of Vik. He was the councillor of dukes Erik and Valdemar Magnusson.

- Father was Gustaf Knutsson Sparre (born 1222, Adelsö, Sweden); grandfather was Knut Sixtensson Sparre (born 1190, Adelsö, Sweden); great grandfather was Sixten Sixtensson Sparre (born 1165 in Tofta, Uppsala, Sweden)
- Married with Ramborg Israelsdotter And.
- Child, Gustav Arvidsson, became knight and member of the Privy Council of Sweden, justiciar of Södermanland.
- His grandson is known as Arvid Gustavsson, Lord of Vik.
- Arvid also had a child named Gisles Arvidsson Sparre with Helena (Elin) Magnusdotter Sture.

== Sources ==
- Äldre svenska frälsesläkter, by Folke Wernstedt, 1965
- https://web.archive.org/web/20070927093311/http://www.artursson.se/0002/2744.htm
