= Benedict of Finland =

Benedict of Finland (Swedish: Hertig Bengt av Finland) may refer to:

- Benedict, Duke of Finland (1254–1291), also Bishop of Linköping
- Benedict, Duke of Halland (c. 1330–c. 1360), also Duke of Finland
