= Queen Blanche (painting) =

Painting by Albert Edelfelt

- Drottning Blanka (Swedish), Kuningatar Blanka (Finnish)
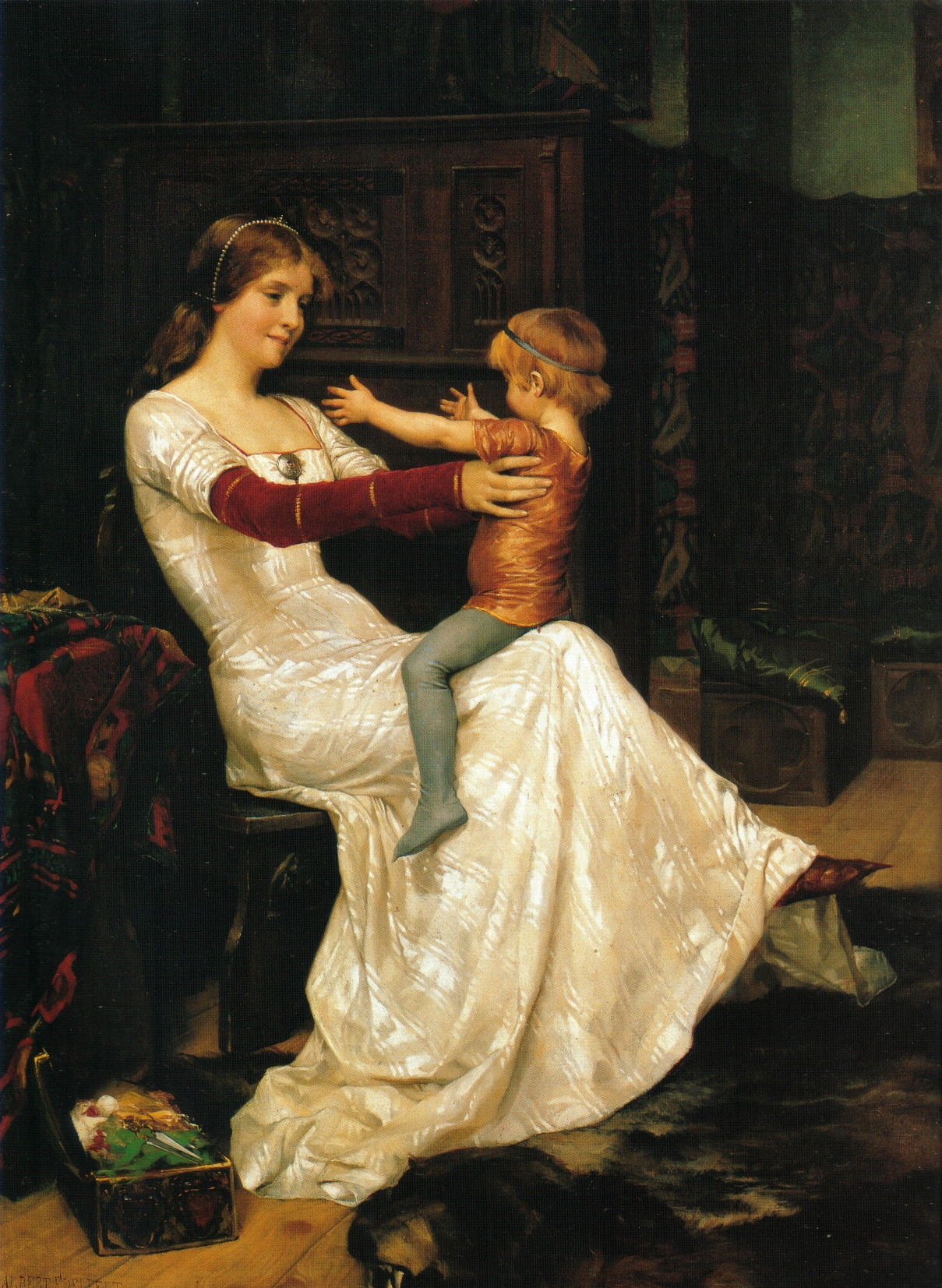
- Artist: Albert Edelfelt
- Year: 1877
- Medium: oil on canvas
- Dimensions: 96,5 cm × 75,5 cm (380 in × 297 in)
- Location: Ateneum, Helsinki
- Website: www.kansallisgalleria.fi/en/object/409717

Queen Blanche is a painting by Finnish painter Albert Edelfelt completed in 1877.

The painting depicts a young blond woman depicting Queen Blanche of Namur (1320–1363), the wife of Swedish king Magnus Eriksson (1316–1374) with a boy riding on her knee.

Albert Edelfelt painted the picture in Paris.

The painting is on display at Ateneum in Helsinki, Finland.
