= Blanche of Namur =

Queen of Norway (1335–1343) and Sweden (1335–1363)

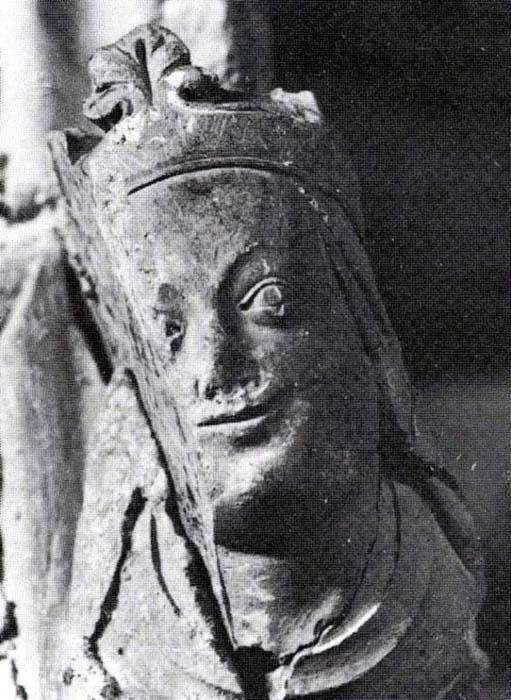
- Contemporary bust of Queen Blanche

Queen consort of Sweden
- Tenure: 1335–1363
- Coronation: 22 July 1336

Queen consort of Norway
- Tenure: 1335–1343
- Born: 1320
- Died: 1363 (aged 42–43)
- Spouse: Magnus Eriksson
- Issue: Haakon VI of Norway; Eric XII of Sweden
- House: Dampierre
- Father: John I, Marquis of Namur
- Mother: Marie of Artois

Blanche of Namur (Swedish and Norwegian: Blanka; 1320–1363) was Queen of Norway and Sweden as the wife of King Magnus Eriksson.

== Background ==
Blanche was the eldest daughter of John I, Marquis of Namur and Marie of Artois. On her father's side, she was a member of the powerful House of Dampierre, being a grandchild of Count Guy of Flanders. On her mother's side Blanche was related to the French royal house, as her mother was a daughter of Philip of Artois, a patrilineal great-grandson of Louis VIII of France, and thus a member of a junior line of the House of Capet. She was related to the English royal house as well, through her great-grandmother, Beatrice of England.

== Marriage ==
It is unknown why a marriage was arranged between the king of Sweden and Norway and a member of the House of Namur. In June 1334 king Magnus travelled from Norway to Namur to propose. They were engaged in Namur and Magnus returned to Sweden in the fall of 1334. Blanche left Namur in the fall of 1335 and the wedding took place in October or early November 1335, possibly at Bohus Castle. As a wedding gift Blanche received the province of Tunsberg in Norway and Lödöse in Sweden as fiefs; Tunsberg was exchanged in 1353 to Bohus, Marstrand, Elfsyssel, Rånrike and Borgarsyssel. Blanche's coronation took place in July 1336, possibly 22 July, in the Great Church in Stockholm. She was accompanied to Sweden by an entourage which included her brothers Robert and Louis, who came to be in service of her spouse: it is known that Louis remained in the king's service as late as 1354.

== Queenship ==
After her coronation, Queen Blanche was given her own seal with the inscription: "Blanche, by the Grace of God Queen of Sweden, Norway and Scania", in which she is depicted with a crown and holding a scepter: unusually for a married woman of that period, she did not cover her hair with a veil.

The queen was described as wise and as an extraordinary beauty. At this point, Sweden did not have an official capital, and Queen Blanche accompanied the King in their travels between the royal residences. In 1345, her brothers Louis and Robert were made vassals of her husband.

Blanche and Magnus had two sons, Eric and Haakon, plus at least three daughters who died as children. In 1343, it was agreed that the two kingdoms of Sweden and Norway should again be divided, and that their eldest son Eric should inherit Sweden and their second son Haakon Norway. The same year, Haakon was invested as King of Norway at the age of three. At this occasion, the members of the Norwegian council guaranteed the right of Magnus to govern Norway during the minority of Haakon and to resist all attempts from Haakon’s elder brother to take over Norway: they swore their promise not only to King Magnus, but also to Queen Blanche. On 18 November 1343, the archbishops and bishops of Sweden swore an oath to assist Blanche in the event Magnus should die when Eric was still minor.

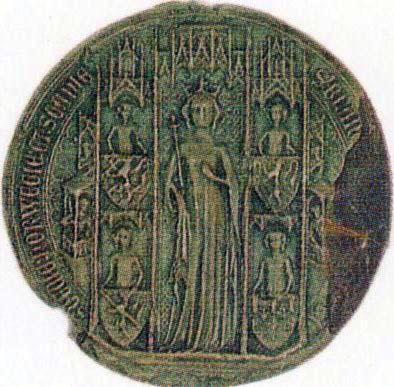
The seal of Blanche of Namur as Queen

The future saint Bridget of Sweden served as magistra or mistress of the robes to the queen at an unknown period, and regularly socialized with the royal couple before she left Sweden for Rome in 1349, and Bridget left descriptions of them and their court. In the will of the royal couple from 1 May 1346, they made large donations to Bridget's planned Vadstena Abbey and asked to be buried there. Bridget, however, opposed their burial in her convent, and described the royal couple in a negative fashion. She accused Queen Blanche of having been a negative influence on state affairs by discrediting capable advisers before the king; "She is a snake with the tongue of a harlot, the bile of dragons in her heart and the most bitter poison in her flesh. Therefore all her eggs became poisonous. Lucky are those who never experience their burden." Bridget expressed great dislike over the fact that the king and queen decided to live in a marriage without intercourse after the queen's seventh pregnancy; she claims that this was the reason for the king's rumored homosexuality, that Queen Blanche had been responsible when King Magnus made his controversial favorite Bengt Algotsson duke of Finland, and that Algotsson was the lover of them both.

In the 1350s, a crisis occurred because of the Black Death in Sweden and Norway and the failed politics in the Baltic, followed by the division of the kingdom of Sweden and Norway, in 1355, when their second son Haakon VI of Norway was declared of legal majority and free from his father's regency, resulting in the end of the First Swedish–Norwegian union. In 1356, the opposition supported their eldest son Eric in a rebellion against his parents, resulting in a mediation where king Magnus had to make Eric his co-ruler and divide Sweden between them. During this conflict, Queen Blanche seems to have supported her husband against their son. When Eric and his wife Beatrix died in 1359, Blanche was accused of having poisoned them, accusations that are however regarded as but propaganda against her. It is now believed that they died from the plague.

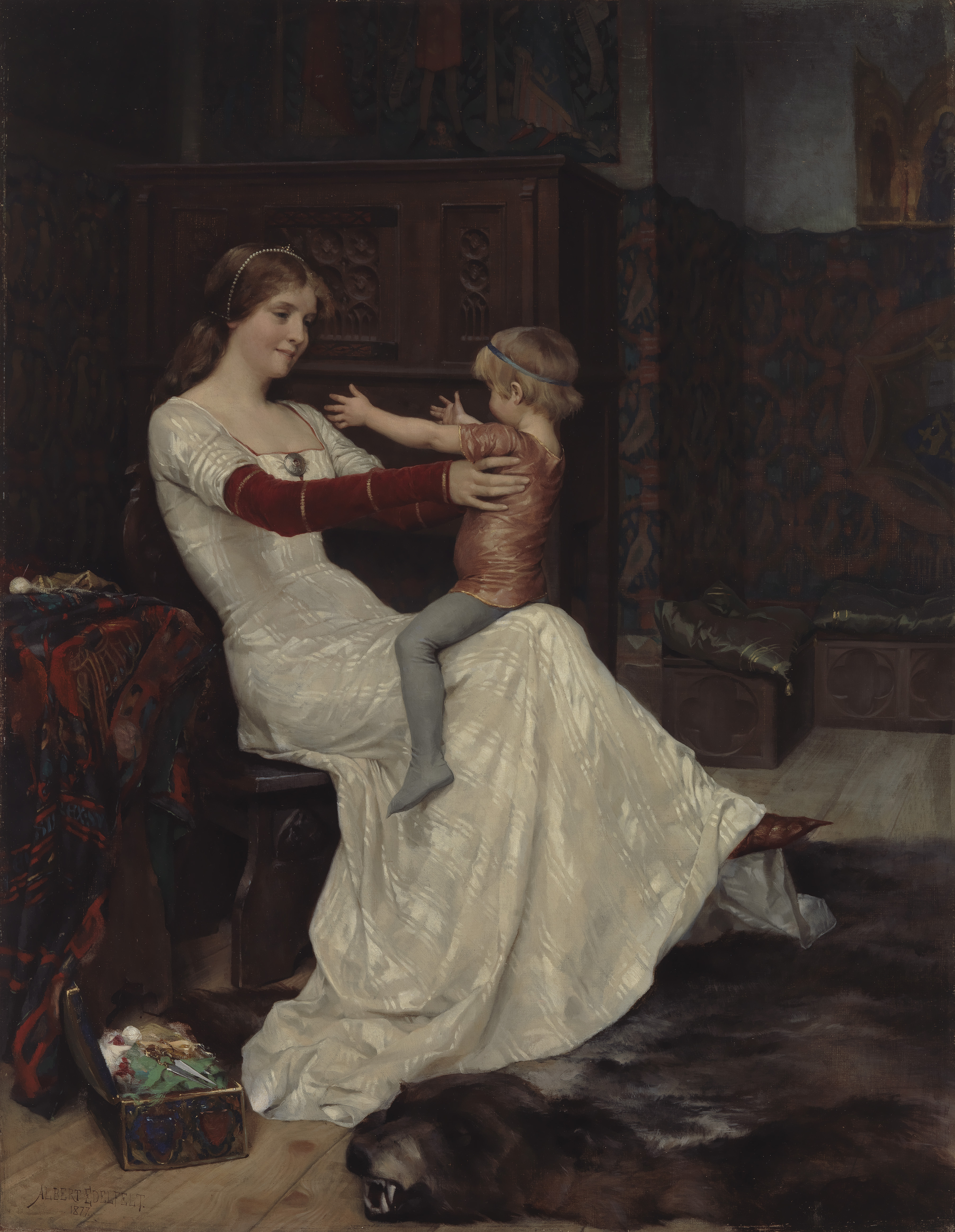
Albert Edelfelt's romanticised painting of Blanche of Namur and her son Haakon, singing the children's song "Rida rida ranka, hästen heter Blanka... (Riding a horse named Blanche...)"

From 1359, she seems to have resided in Tønsberg Castle in Norway. Tønsberg was a part of her dower lands, and she ruled the area as her dower. It appears that her finances were somewhat strained during these years.

On 9 April 1363, she and Magnus attended the wedding of their son Haakon with Margaret, daughter of Valdemar IV of Denmark, in Copenhagen. Shortly after the wedding, Blanche fell ill and died. The cause of death and the place where she is buried are unknown.

== Issue ==
1. Eric XII of Sweden
2. Haakon VI of Norway
3. At least three daughters who died in infancy or early childhood, some buried at Ås Abbey.

== Legacy ==
Queen Blanche is one of the most well-known of the Swedish/Norwegian medieval queens. Apparently, she was very politically and socially active and noticeable, not only as a queen, as many stories and songs were written about her.

In Sweden, Queen Blanche is also remembered for the song: "Rida rida ranka, hästen heter Blanka" ("Ride, ride on my knee, the horse is called Blanka"), which has influenced the famous historical painting by Albert Edelfelt of her and her son Haakon.

== Bibliography ==
- Nordberg, Michael (1995). I kung Magnus tid. Norstedts. ISBN 91-1-952122-7.
- Wilhelmina Stålberg (Swedish): Anteqningar om svenska qvinnor [Notes on Swedish women]

Blanche of Namur House of Dampierre Born: 1320 Died: 1363
Royal titles
| Preceded by Martha of Denmark | Queen consort of Sweden; 1335–1363 with Beatrix of Bavaria | Succeeded by Margaret of Denmark |
| Preceded by Euphemia of Rügen | Queen consort of Norway; 1335–1343 | Succeeded by Margaret of Denmark |
