= Ås Abbey =

Cistercian monastery in Halland

Coordinates: 57°13′31.86″N 12°13′7.83″E

Seal of Ås Abbey from 1377; the text reads: "S'[CON]VENTUS S'MARIE DE ASYLO"

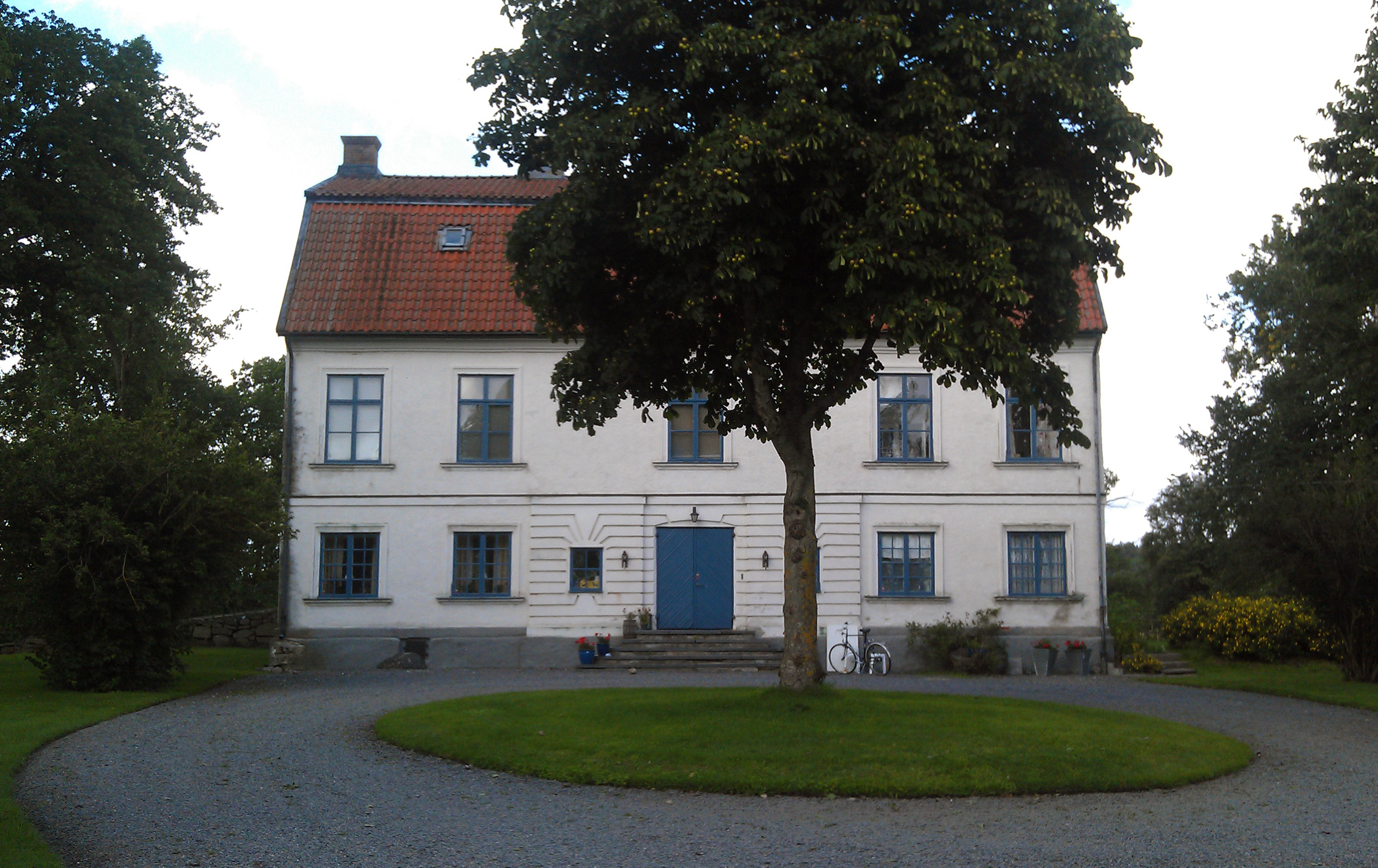
Åsklosters kungsgård from 1806 built on the former site of Ås Abbey

Ås Abbey (Swedish: Ås Kloster; Latin: Asylum) was a Cistercian monastery situated near the present village of Åskloster about 14 km north of Varberg, in Varberg Municipality. It was located near the mouth of the River Viskan into the Kattegat in Halland, formerly part of Denmark but now in Sweden.

== History ==
Ås Abbey was founded as a Cistercian monastery in 1192 and settled in 1194 by a community from its mother house, Sorø Abbey. The monastery was the first, largest and richest in Halland.

According to Kong Valdemars Jordebog, King Valdemar II (1170–1241) gave the new monastery the royal farm of Ås (the exact location of which is no longer certain). The abbey was eventually the owner of about 250 farms and estates. The abbey enjoyed great standing and prestige: two or three children of Magnus Eriksson, King of Sweden (1316–1374) and his queen, Blanka of Namur, were buried here.

Ås Abbey was closed in the early 16th century and the buildings were destroyed during the Count's Feud in 1535. There are no visible ruins and the site lies buried under the manor house Åsklosters kungsgård. The manor house was built between 1806 and 1813 on the basis of plans originally drawn by Swedish architect Carl Hårleman (1700–1753).

The exact location of the monastery buildings was uncertain for a long time since there are no visible ruins above ground on site. In 2009–2010, the Swedish National Heritage Board carried out a survey of the area. The analysis revealed underground remains. A small area was excavated by archaeological excavation. Parts of the monastery's eastern length and an extension to it from the 13th-14th century were exposed. In 2011, the southeast part of the monastery was excavated where there was a room with a stone floor.

== Abbots ==
- 1194- unknown
- 1238-1241 Th[omas?]
- 1259 [Nicolaus - formerly abbot of Sorø, possibly abbot of Ås)
- 1343-1350 Andreas
- 1362-1378 Petrus
- 1379-1386 Johannes Mattisson
- 1386-1392 Niels (Nicolaus) Clemensen
- 1392 Nicolas Johannis (Pr[o]fessus)
- 1393 Niels (the same as Nicolas Johannis?)
- 1396-1398 Sven
- 1403?-1405? Nicolaus (Niels)
- 1403?-1405? Peter
- 1406? Nicolaus
- 1408-1458 Peter Thuwasson
- 1462-1481 Lindorm
- 1491-1492 Anders Bengtsson
- 1498 Anders Nilsson
- 1514-1532 Mats (Mattias) Eriksson

== Other sources ==
- Nielsen, Oluf (red.) (1873) Liber Census Daniæ. Kong Valdemar den Andens Jordebog (Copenhagen: Gads Forlag)
