= Walborg and Karin Jota =

Walborg and Karin Jota (Floruit 1350), were two Swedish women who, according to legend, were appointed officials of the court after the great Black Death in Sweden. If the legend is true, they had a unique position for their time.

The legend says that when the judge of the county of Värmland reassembled the court, after the great black plague had passed Sweden in 1350, they were two members short. Instead of the stipulated twelve officials, they were only ten left. It was not possible to elect two new men to fill their places, because of the great death numbers of the plague. The judge therefore decided to call upon these two women, Karin Jota from Kallhyttan and Walborg from Nordmarkshyttan, to fill the places of the court to make the number complete. These were not only formal positions; the two women took an active part in the affairs of the court. According to the legend, the judge had great respect for their judgement and wisdom, he often asked for their opinion and advice, and often followed it.
