= Tofta, Adelsö =

Coordinates: 59°23′13.4″N 17°28′20.5″E

Tofta was a seat farm and noted manorial lordship in medieval Sweden, located in Adelsö, Uppland. Its most prominent holder was Karl Ulfsson, Lord of Tofta, maternal grandfather of king Charles VIII of Sweden.

Charles VIII had an invented, partially fabricated genealogy published (see Nils av Tofta in Swedish) to create himself a descent from an invented granddaughter of king Eric IX of Sweden the Saint through some historically unattested earlier lords of Tofta.
