= Erik Magnusson, King of Sweden =

King of Sweden from 1356 to 1359

Erik Magnusson
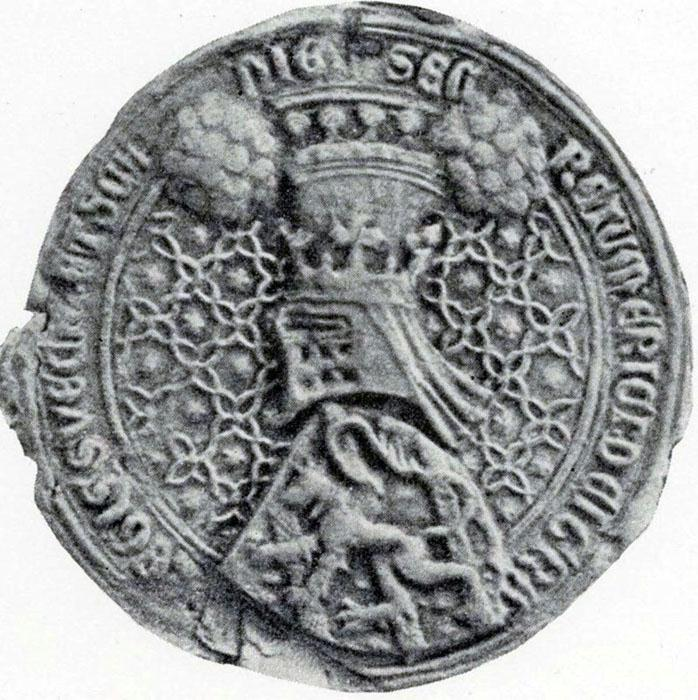
- The seal of King Erik Magnusson

King of Sweden
- Reign: 1356 – 20 June 1359
- Predecessor: Magnus Eriksson (as sole king)
- Successor: Magnus Eriksson
- Born: Early 1339
- Died: 20 June 1359 (aged 20)
- Spouse: Beatrix of Bavaria
- House: Bjälbo
- Father: Magnus Eriksson
- Mother: Blanche of Namur

Erik Magnusson (1339 – 20 June 1359), sometimes known as Erik XII, (Note: Referring to Erik Magnusson as King Erik XII is a later invention, counting backwards from Erik XIV (1560–68). Erik XIV and his brother Charles IX (1604–1611) adopted numerals according to a fictitious history of Sweden. The number of Swedish monarchs named Erik before Erik XIV (at least seven) is unknown, going back into prehistory. It would be speculative to try to affix a mathematically accurate one to this king.) was a Swedish prince who was formally elected King of Sweden in 1344. He held no real power before 1356, when he led a rebellion against his father, King Magnus Eriksson, forcing Magnus to divide the kingdom with him. Erik then ruled large parts of Sweden and Scania alongside his father until his sudden death in 1359, possibly from the Black Death.

== Early life ==
Erik was born in early 1339 as the eldest son of King Magnus Eriksson (1316–1374) who ruled both Sweden and Norway. When Magnus' second son, Haakon, was born the following year, Magnus decided to divide the kingdoms between his sons. Erik was designated to succeed his father as King of Sweden, while Haakon would become King of Norway during his father's lifetime. Although, by Norwegian law, Erik was the rightful heir to the Norwegian throne, the Norwegian Council of the Realm agreed to this arrangement in 1343. In 6 December 1344, Erik was formally elected King of Sweden at the Stones of Mora.

== Marriage ==
In 1342, Magnus's brother-in-law Albert II, Duke of Mecklenburg, approached Holy Roman Emperor Louis IV to propose a union between Erik and Beatrix of Bavaria, Louis IV's granddaughter. Beatrix's parents were Louis I of Brandenburg, the eldest son of Emperor Louis, and Margrete, daughter of King Christopher II of Denmark. The marriage aligned with Magnus's strategic interests, as Beatrix's dynastic claims could strengthen his position in the ongoing conflicts with Valdemar IV of Denmark. Additionally, the union could also advance Magnus' ambitions in Estonia, which Valdemar had nominally ceded to Louis as compensation for Margrete's unpaid dowry. However, both Emperor Louis IV and Louis of Brandenburg had been excommunicated by the Catholic Church, and Magnus had to petition Pope Clement VI regarding the marriage arrangement, as noted in a letter from the pope to the king in 1347.

The exact date of the wedding is unknown. Beatrix is believed to have been around the same age as Erik, and one of Saint Bridget's revelations indicates that the marriage took place while she was still a minor. Some sources suggest that the wedding occurred as early as 1346, but the only certainty is that it took place before 25 October 1356.

== Rebellion against Magnus ==
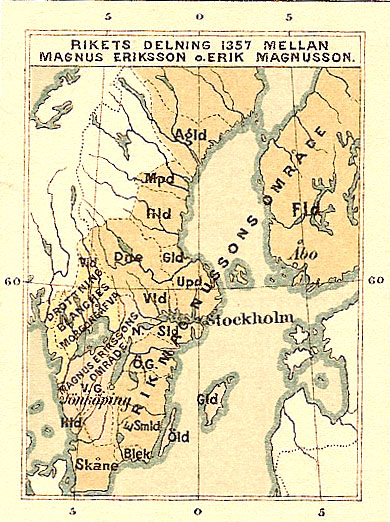
Partition of Sweden between Magnus and Erik in 1357

In 1356, Erik became the figurehead of a rebellion against King Magnus. His discontent stemmed from his lack of power. In 1355, his younger brother Haakon had been declared of age and had become the sovereign ruler of Norway. Meanwhile, Erik remained powerless in Sweden, where his father continued to rule. Magnus was also only 39 years old, so no change was expected in the near future. Magnus's decision to appoint his favourite, the non-royal Bengt Algotsson, as Duke of Halland and Finland only added to the resentment. This position was traditionally reserved for members of the royal house.

The rebellion proceeded quickly. On 17 October 1356, Erik issued an open letter from Kalmar to the inhabitants of the Diocese of Linköping, urging them to help him fight Duke Bengt. Although the rebellion was directed against King Magnus, he was not mentioned in the letter. Erik assumed the title of king in the letter. The army arrived in Lund on 30 October and then proceeded to Halland. There, he captured the Varberg Fortress and forced Duke Bengt into exile.

Erik's revolt drew support from Swedish and Scanian magnates who opposed Magnus for various political and financial reasons. Among his supporters were Archbishop Jacob Nielsen of Lund and five of Sweden's seven bishops. The clergy's opposition stemmed from Magnus's debts from the acquisition of Scania and his campaign against Novgorod. After the Black Death reached Sweden in 1350, Magnus's tax revenues collapsed, leaving him unable to repay his debts. In 1351, he acquired a short-term papal loan, guaranteed by the bishops, who risked excommunication if the loan was not repaid. Tensions escalated further when Magnus abolished the tax immunity for clerical frälse in 1352 and ordered the confiscation of the properties of the archbishopric of Lund in 1356.

Magnus was forced to give half of his realm to his son. This division was formalized in Jönköping on April 28, 1357. Erik was granted control over Scania, southern Halland, Finland, and some other parts of Sweden. The following summer, he traveled to Finland to take control of his castles there.

However, Erik did not remain satisfied with his portion of the realm for long, as the rebellion had left him in heavy debt and he had to distribute the lands to his followers. Duke Albrecht of Mecklenburg, who had provided troops for Erik's service, received Skanör and Falsterbo for 12 years. His sons Heinrich and Albrecht the Younger (later King Albrecht of Sweden) received southern Halland and the hundreds of Bjäre and Norra Åsbo as hereditary fiefs. Other allies received bonds of debt, and Bengt Algotsson's confiscated estates were distributed to the Swedish magnates.

Erik's demands led to a revision in November 1357. Magnus handed over Stockholm, as well as Södermanland, Uppland, Västmanland and Dalarna, to his son.

== Foreign policy and further conflict ==
King Valdemar Atterdag of Denmark had supported Erik's rebellion against Magnus. However, after the Jönköping Agreement, Erik began to pursue an aggressive foreign policy against Denmark. In September 1357, Erik formed an alliance with the Counts of Holstein-Rendsburg against Valdemar and Bengt Algotsson, who had sought refuge in Denmark. In early January 1358, Erik declared war on Valdemar Atterdag, alongside Duke Albrecht of Mecklenburg and the counts of Holstein, as well as other German princes. Erik gathered troops from Sweden and Finland. After mid-August 1358, Duke Albrecht's army arrived in Scania, leading to a standoff with Valdemar Atterdag's forces at Helsingborg. Peace negotiations began in October 1358, and shortly afterwards, King Valdemar concluded peace with the German princes. According to the Chronica Sialandie, Erik committed atrocities during this war by ordering the burning of a church sheltering refugees.

The conflict between Erik and Magnus erupted again, and by the late autumn of 1358, Magnus had obtained Helsingborg Castle. Sources regarding the events are sparse. From Helsingborg, Magnus issued a letter which announced that reconciliation would be sought. The letter names supporters of King Magnus as Queen Blanka, his son Haakon, Valdemar Atterdag, and the archbishop of Lund, who had also defected to Magnus's side. On Erik's side, Bishop Nils Markusson of Linköping, and Erengisle Sunesson, the Earl of Orkney, are mentioned. According to the letter, the terms of the reconciliation would be announced on March 17.

Magnus and Erik seem to indeed have been reconciled in 1359 and co-ruled Sweden until Erik's death a few months later. Quite soon after his death his wife, Beatrix, died as well. It is generally believed that they both died of the Black Death.

== Works cited ==
- Nordberg, Michael (1995). I kung Magnus tid (in Swedish). Stockholm: Norstedt. ISBN 91-1-952122-7.
- Suvanto, Seppo (1997). "Bengt Algotinpoika (K 1360)". Kansallisbiografia (in Finnish). Suomalaisen Kirjallisuuden Seura. (available via Biografiasampo)
- Engström, Sten (1953). "Erik Magnusson". Svenskt biografiskt lexikon. Archived from the original on 2023-10-20.
- Schütz, Alois (1987). "Ludwig der Brandenburger". Neue Deutsche Biographie (in German).
- Suvanto, Seppo (2000). "Eerik Maununpoika". Kansallisbiografia (via Biografiasampo) (in Finnish).

Erik Magnusson House of Bjälbo Born: 1339 Died: 1359
Regnal titles
Preceded by Magnus Eriksson as sole king	King of Sweden; 1356–1359 with Magnus Eriksson	Succeeded by Magnus Eriksson as sole king
