= Karl Ulfsson, Lord of Tofta =

Swedish magnate and High Constable of Sweden

Karl Ulfsson (Sparre av Tofta) (c. 1317 – 1407–11) was a 14th-century Swedish magnate and High Constable of Sweden.

== Biography ==
His birth year is unknown, but scholarly estimates point to 1320s or early 1330s at latest. He was born as the son of the first marriage of knight Ulf Abjörnson of Engso, justiciar of Tiohärad (d. 1347) with Kristina Sigmundsdotter of the family of Tre Klöverblad. His and his father's coat of arms was a chevron ('spar'), and so this family is one of the numerous medieval Scandinavian families retrospectively named Sparre. Through his paternal grandmother, Karl was a descendant of the Ulv branch of the House of Bjälbo (Folkungaätten) and numbered some ancient Swedish earls among his ancestors.

Karl was literate and studied in Paris. He was knighted between 1354 and 1358, and summoned to the membership of the High Council of Sweden from 1356 at latest. He also acted as lawspeaker of Uppland from no later than 1362.

His step-mother Märta Sunadotter of Hultboda, heiress of Fogelvik, was sister of Erengisle Sunesson, Earl of Orkney. From 1356, they supported the efforts of King Erik Magnusson to rise to equal rulership with, or to depose, his father King Magnus Eriksson.

His half-sister, Ingeborg Ulfsdotter married a young nobleman Bengt Algotsson (c. 1330 – c. 1360) in the early 1350s. He was a favorite of King Magnus Eriksson. However, the duke was under increasing attacks and dissatisfaction from the party of high nobility. Bengt repudiated Duchess Ingeborg sometime in c. 1356. In 1360, Karl was with troops in Scania. Bengt Algotsson was besieged at Rönneholm Castle, and Karl reportedly took part in killing him personally.

Karl supported King Albert III of Mecklenburg. During Albert's reign, he was Lord High Constable of Sweden (Riksmarsk) in 1364–71. However, he accepted Queen Margaret's rule when she deposed Albert in 1388–89. Albert had appointed him as the castellan of Viborg (see Fief of Viborg) sometime in the 1380s. He continued in this responsible and very autonomous position over the change of ruler until 1399.

== Personal life ==
He was married several times, possibly as many as five, but had fairly few surviving children. With his first wife (wed 6 May 1352) Ingrid Eriksdotter of Boberg, daughter of Erik Larsson of Boberg and his wife Birgitta Knutsdotter, he had a son Knut Karlsson of Tofta. He was the only son to survive to adulthood. Knut also was knighted and was from 1376 justiciar of Södermanland, but predeceased his father, dying probably in 1389 and was apparently unmarried and childless.

Karl's second wife (from 1363) was Helena Israelsdotter of Finsta, who died ca. 1375. She was the daughter of Israel Birgersson of Finsta, justiciar of Uppland. Helena was sister of Karl' first cousin Philip Nielson of Salsta's wife Ramborg Israelsdotter of Finsta. There are no indications of any surviving children of either marriage.

His third wife was named Cecilia. The names of the fourth and the possible fifth wife's names are unknown, but one of them bore a daughter, Margareta Karlsdotter of Tofta, sometime around the 1380s or early 1390s.

Karl inherited in ca. 1389 from his son who had inherited a sizable property from his maternal kin. Also in ca. 1389, Karl inherited from his half-sister, Kristina Ulfsdotter, heiress of Fogelvik, widow of lord Peder Ribbing and of Niels of Rickeby, heiress of her sister Duchess Ingeborg of Halland and Finland, and her mother Märta Sunadotter, a daughter of Sune Jonsson, justiciar of Tiohärad, one of the first margraves of Viborg.

Karl was survived by his daughter Margareta Karlsdotter of Tofta (c 1380s - 1429), who was married twice; first to Knut Tordsson Bonde of Penningby and secondly in 1414 to Sten Turesson, Lord of Vik and Örby. Margaret was the mother of King Karl Knutsson (1408–1470) and of Birgitta Stensdotter of Vik, heiress of Örby and Ekholmen. Her descendants included Regent Sten Sture the Elder and Birgitta Gustavsdotter of Revsnes, who became grandmother of Gustav Vasa.

== Other Sources ==
- Folke Wernstedt (1957) Äldre svenska frälsesläkter (Stockholm : Riddarhusdirektionen)
