= Rasmus Ludvigsson =

Swedish 16th-century genealogist

Rasmus Ludvigsson (late 1510s - 1594), was a Swedish royal secretary, historian and genealogist. He was the son of the baker Ludvig (d. 1546) and Anna Persdotter. He is known for his comprehensive books with records of the history and connections of Swedish noble families, and although some earlier genealogical books of similar nature exist, he has been called "Sweden's first genealogist." In 1567 he was accused of making false registers and sentenced to death, but was pardoned.

== Works ==
Rasmus enrolled in 1539 at the University of Rostock and entered Gustav Vasa's service in the 1540s. He is mentioned as royal chancery clerk 1542–1549, as royal secretary from 1555 and continued as such under kings Erik XIV and John III. He was commissioned to examine the letters of churches and monasteries for assessment of the king's right to reclaim property in connection with the Reformation, and thereby gained extensive knowledge of the noble families' origins and connections. He wrote down his genealogical investigations in numerous books, which are now found in the National Archives' Genealogica collection and in other public collections.

Rasmus' genealogies have been used as material by subsequent genealogists, who have gained knowledge of Sweden's medieval families and which have been prevailing several hundred years later (and partly still today). He also established a register of the properties the nobility had wrongfully "seized and grabbed" from the former ecclesiastical nobility and made extensive investigations regarding the Danish nobility's properties in Sweden as well as the Swedish nobility's in Denmark. In all these documents, important contributions to medieval property and family history are provided.

Furthermore, he wrote a continuation of Peder Swart's history of Gustav Vasa (a text formerly known under the name "Rasmus Karlsson's chronicle"). From his hand there are also some annalistic notes regarding Sweden's history, which partly seem to be derived from some now lost chronology, as well as some minor writings of lesser historical significance.

== Critical readings ==
Rasmus' books in the Genealogica series were the subject of a doctoral dissertation by Holger Rosman in 1897, whereby his information was reevaluated. Previously, his information had been uncritically accepted as truth. K. H. Karlsson wrote in Nordisk familjebok how Rasmus' work often was based on guesswork and that since his work had been accepted, without question or critique, by subsequent historians there is still a large degree of confusion and ignorance surrounding the Swedish Middle Ages.

In the years 1946–1952, a further major and more public review of the material was carried out by Hans Gillingstam. A genealogical book by Rasmus often cited in older literature probably burned up in the castle fire of 1697, but its contents are preserved in the Skokloster collection and the Rålambska collection. Rasmus Ludvigsson's commission when he wrote his genealogical tables was to establish an inventory list of land deeds in the archives of cathedrals and monasteries. According to Gillingstam, Rasmus' genealogical books are most reliable regarding contemporary family relationships. Gillingstam assumes that he also used extensive, now lost, older source material, something that Rosman in his time rejected. In addition to historical documents, Rasmus used Saxo's historical work and other foreign books that existed in Sweden at his time, gravestones and epitaphs, as well as oral material.

Peder Månsson Utter, probably related to Rasmus, continued his work, and in certain books in the Genealogica series there are traces of both their hands. According to Rosman, Utter's work derives from Rasmus', but Gillingstam believes it is difficult to determine whether these are Utter's own excerpts or copies.

== Grave monuments at Vreta Abbey ==
During the reign of John III work was done to replace the royal gravestones in Vreta Abbey with newer and more ornate ones. Rasmus Ludvigsson was charged with writing the inscriptions on the new monuments. His inscriptions were based on whole or parts of inscriptions originating from the Middle Ages that had been preserved through the Reformation.

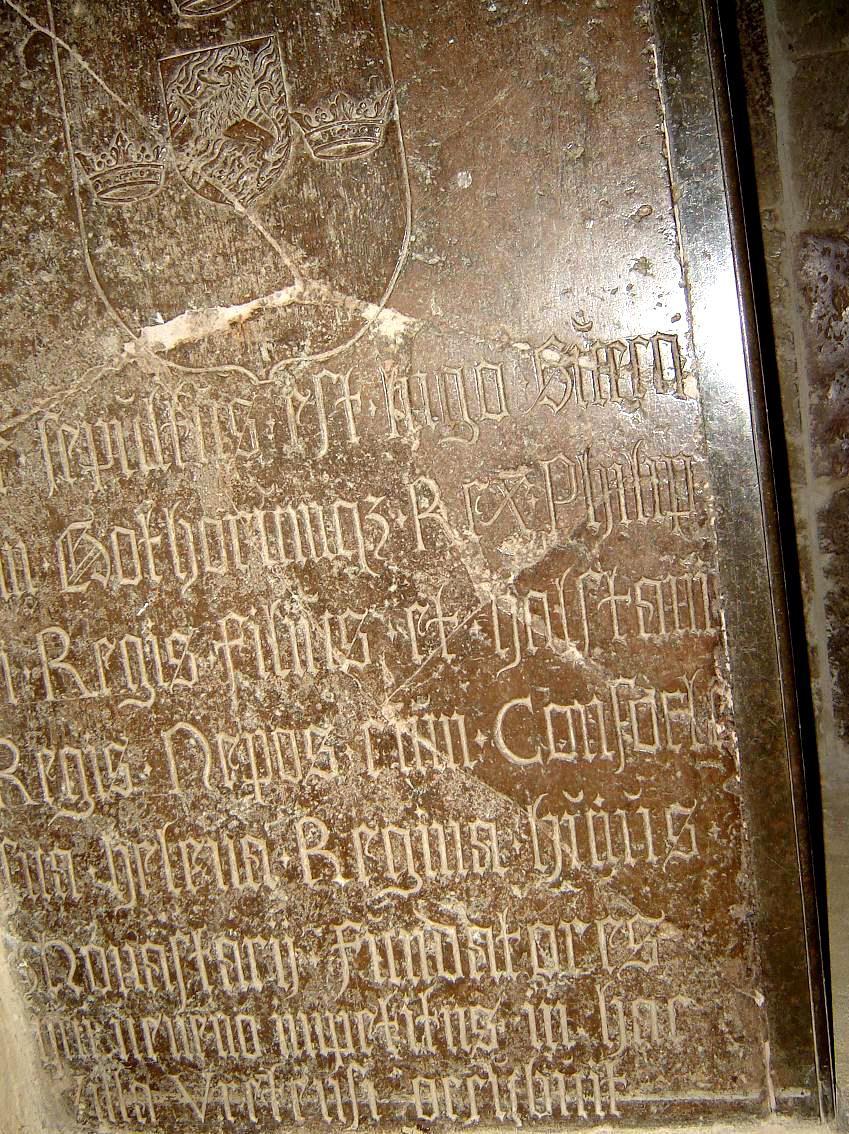
Grave Rasmus identified as Inge, son of Philip, and grandson of Halsten, who died from poison in Vreta. He is buried with his wife Helena, the founders of the monastery.

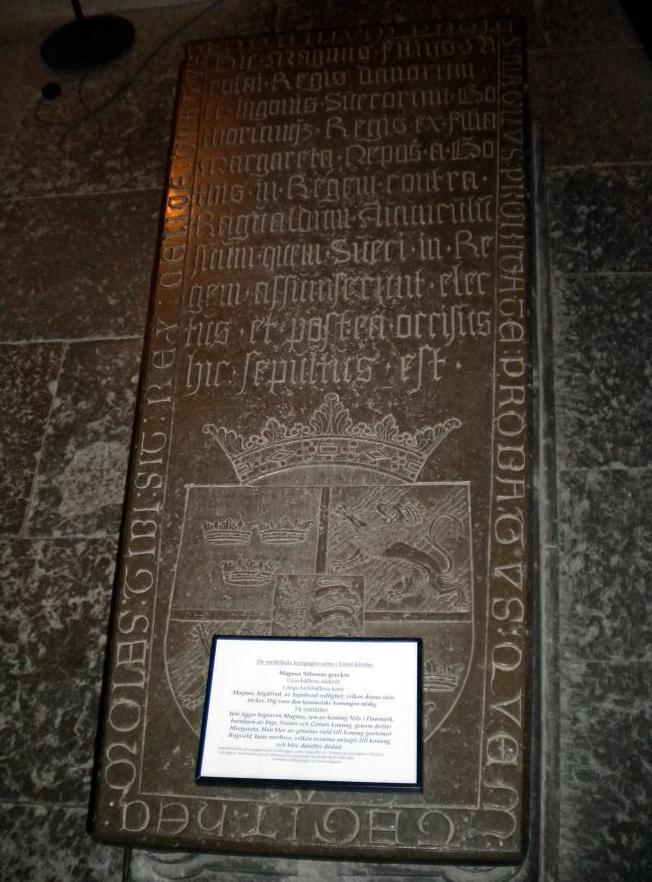
Grave identified by Rasmus as Magnus, the son of king Niels of Denmark, and grandson of king Inge through his daughter Margareta.

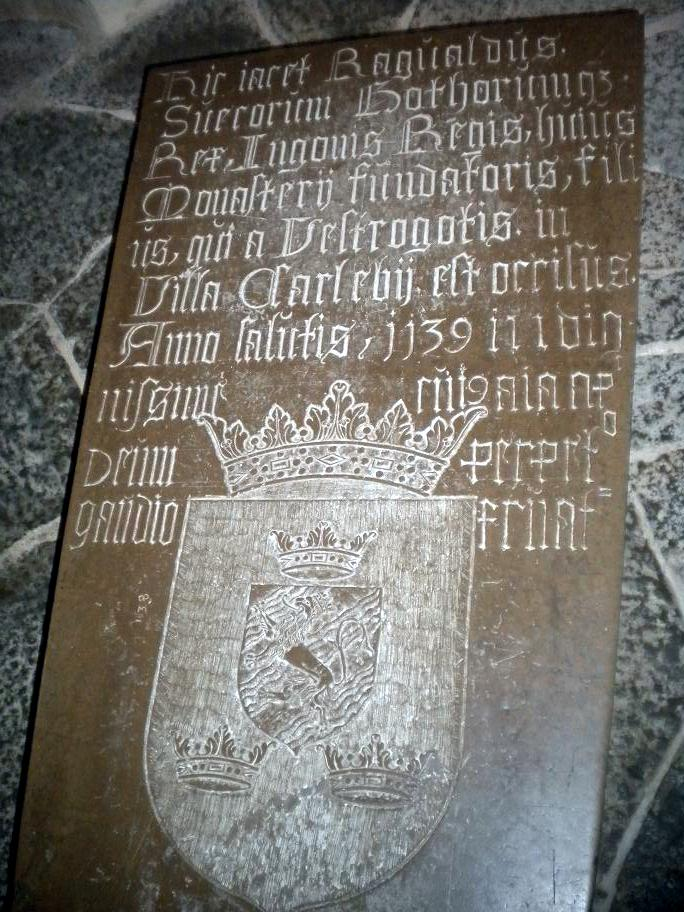
Grave Rasmus identified as Ragnvald, the son of Inge, who was killed by the Westgoths in Karlsby in 1139.

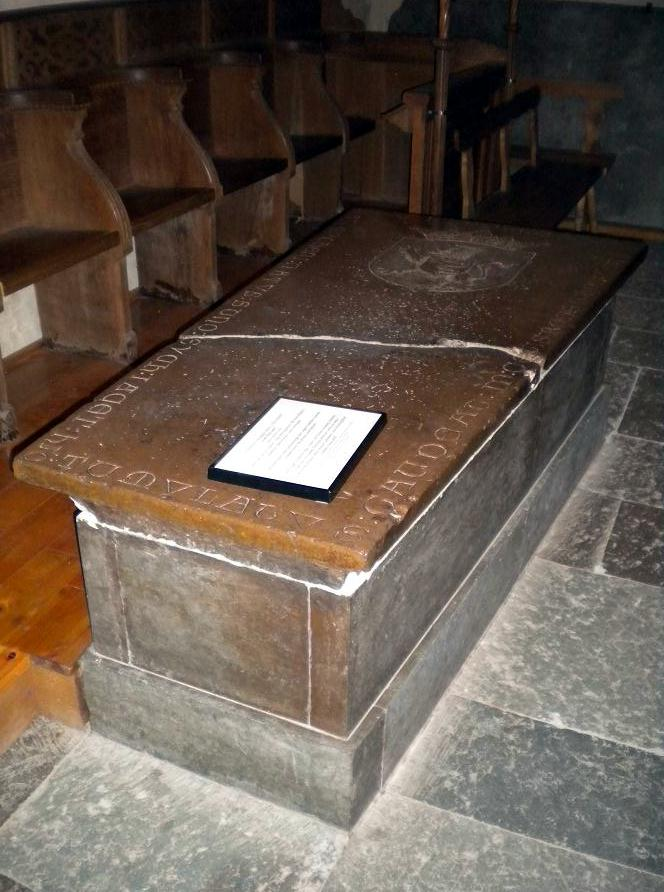
Grave of Sune Sik, son of king Sverker.

== Bibliography ==
- Holger Rosman, Rasmus Ludvigsson som genealog, (1897)
- Hans Gillingstam: Rasmus Ludvigsson in Svenskt biografiskt lexikon (1995-1997), volume 29, pages 700-703. Contains comprehensive list of sources and older literature.
- Jan Liedgren, "Rasmus Ludvigsson och förteckningarna över Vasahusets jordabrev" in: Individ och historia. Studier tillägnade Hans Gillingstam 22 februari 1990. Stockholm 1990.
