= Magnus Eriksson =

King of Sweden (1319–1364) and Norway (1319–1355)

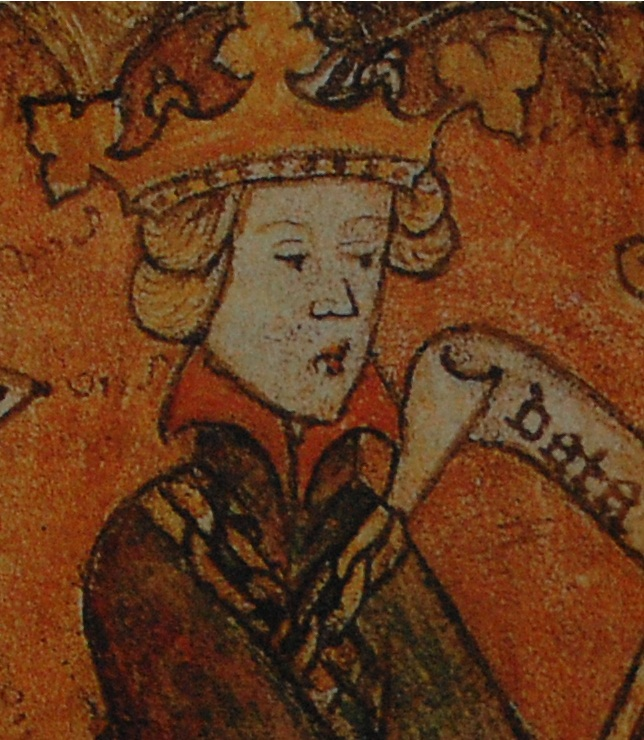
- Magnus on the title page of his Swedish national lawcode (issue 1430)

King of Sweden
- Reign: 8 July 1319 – 15 February 1364
- Coronation: 21 July 1336
- Predecessor: Birger
- Successor: Albert

King of Norway
- Reign: August 1319 – 1355
- Predecessor: Haakon V
- Successor: Haakon VI
- Born: April or May 1316; Norway
- Died: 1 December 1374 (aged 58); Bømlafjorden, Norway (shipwreck)
- Spouse: Blanche of Namur (m. 1335; died 1363)
- Issue: Erik XII of Sweden; Haakon VI of Norway
- House: Bjälbo
- Father: Erik Magnusson
- Mother: Ingeborg of Norway

Magnus Eriksson (April or May 1316 – 1 December 1374) was King of Sweden from 1319 to 1364, King of Norway as Magnus VII from 1319 to 1355, and ruler of Scania from 1332 to 1360. His long reign saw major legal and administrative reforms, including the introduction of Magnus Erikssons landslag, the first law code intended to apply throughout the Swedish countryside.

Medieval Swedish kings did not use regnal numbers as part of their titles. Magnus is therefore variously referred to in modern sources as Magnus II, Magnus III, or Magnus IV. He was also known by the later epithet Magnus Smek, the meaning of which has been variously interpreted. Magnus remained Sweden's longest-reigning monarch until 2018, when the length of his reign was surpassed by Carl XVI Gustaf.

== Biography ==
=== Early life and accession ===
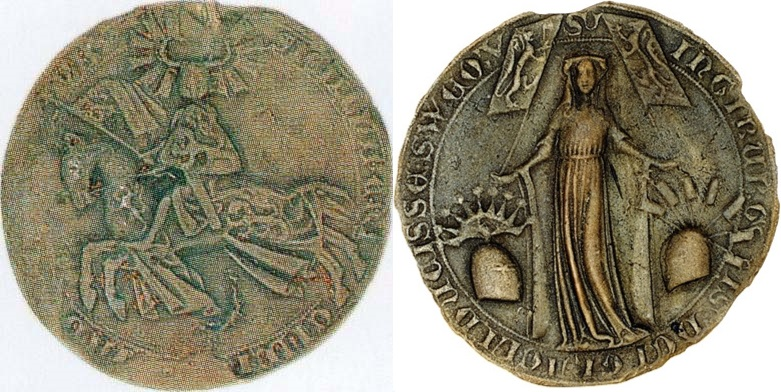
Royal seals of Magnus's parents Duke Erik and Duchess Ingeborg

Magnus was born in Norway, either in April or May 1316. His father was Duke Erik Magnusson, son of King Magnus Ladulås of Sweden. His mother was Ingeborg, daughter of King Haakon V of Norway. Magnus was elected king of Sweden on 8 July 1319 at Mora Thing to prevent the previous king Birger Magnusson, his uncle, from returning to power. Magnus was also acknowledged as the hereditary king of Norway at Haugating in Tønsberg in August of the same year. After his mother Ingeborg was removed from the regency in 1322–1323, the countries were ruled by local magnates until Magnus came of age.

Magnus was declared to have come of age at 15 in 1331. This provoked resistance in Norway, where a statute from 1302 stipulated that a king came of age at the age of 20, and a rising by Erling Vidkunsson and other Norwegian nobles ensued. In 1333, the rebels submitted to King Magnus.

=== Treaty of Nöteborg ===
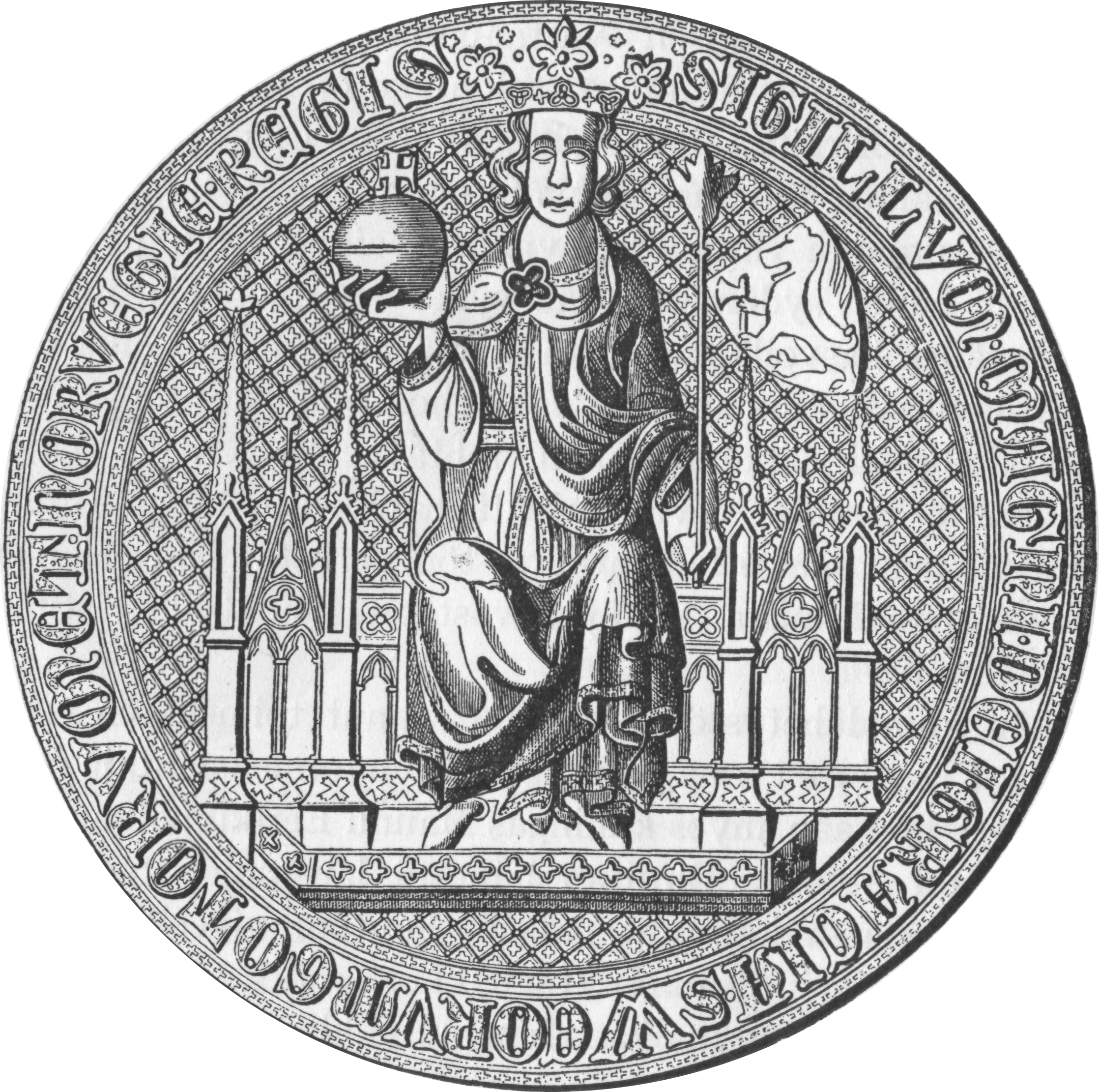
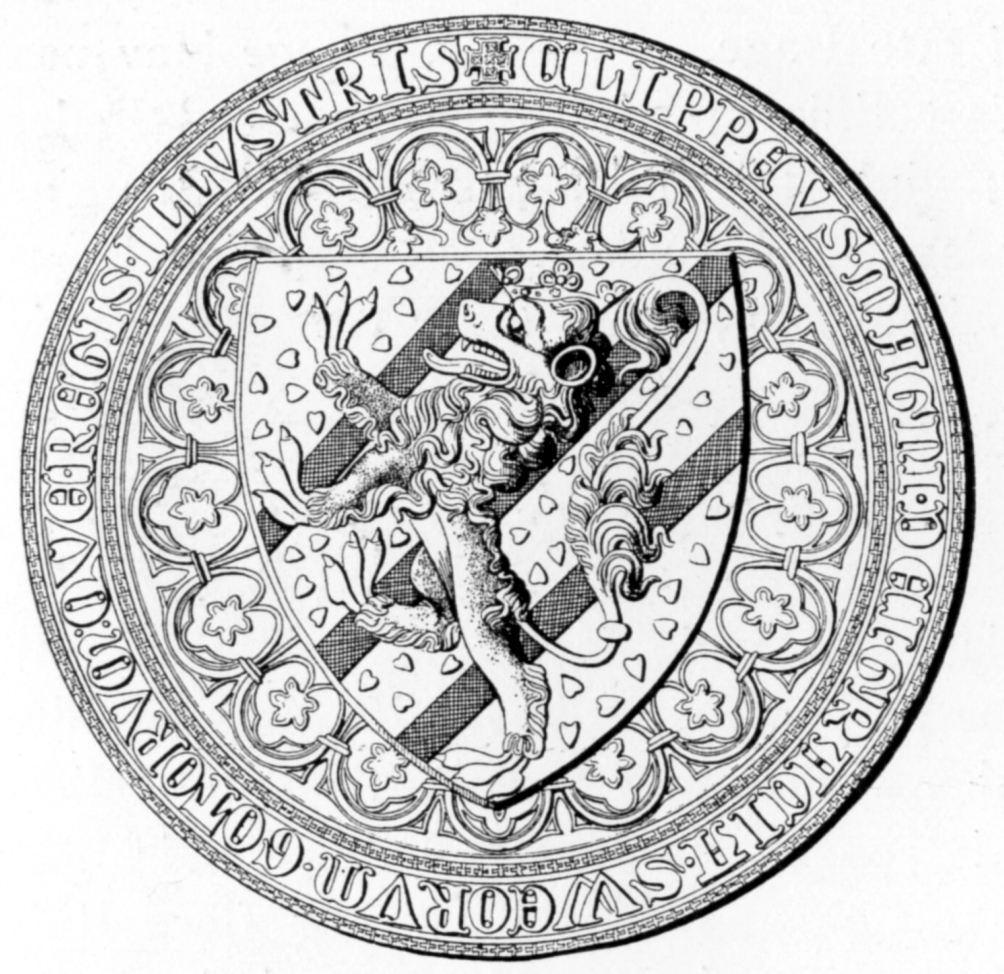
Seal of King Magnus, here showing the front (left) and reverse (right)

On 12 August 1323, Magnus concluded the first treaty between Sweden and Novgorod (represented by Grand Prince Yury of Moscow) at Nöteborg (Orekhov) where Lake Ladoga empties into the Neva River. The treaty delineated spheres of influence among the Finns and Karelians and was supposed to be an "eternal peace", but Magnus' relations with the Russian states were not so peaceful. In 1337, religious strife between Orthodox Karelians and the Swedes led to a Swedish attack on the town of Korela (Keksholm, Priozersk) and Viborg (Viipuri in Finnish, Vyborg in Russian), in which the Novgorodian and Ladogan merchants there were slaughtered. A Swedish commander named Sten also captured the fortress at Orekhov. Negotiations with the Novgorodian mayor (posadnik) Fedor were inconclusive and the Swedes attacked Karelians around Lake Ladoga and Lake Onega before a peace was concluded in 1339 along the old terms of the 1323 treaty. In this treaty, the Swedes claimed that Sten and others acted on their own without the consent of the king.

=== Early reign ===
==== Acquisition of Scania ====
In 1332, the lands of the eastern Danish provinces, which included Scania, Blekinge and Ven were sold to King Magnus by Duke Johan of Holstein (who had received the provinces from the Danish king), after the local population expressed dissatisfaction with Duke Johan and stated they would rather be ruled by the Swedes. The Duke started negotiations with the Swedes and it was agreed that the Swedish king would redeem the pledge for 34,000 marks of silver (6 432 kilo). When the Danish king refused to recognise King Magnus's ownership of Skåneland, Magnus turned to the Pope, requesting confirmation of the purchase but received only evasive answers. Mainly as a result of his mother's lien on certain castles in Denmark, Magnus waged war with King Valdemar in the Kalundborg War. Peace between them was concluded in the autumn of 1343 in Varberg, when Valdemar formally renounced all claims to Scania, Blekinge and Halland.

==== Abolition of thralldom ====
In 1335, Magnus outlawed thralldom (slavery) for thralls "born by Christian parents" in Västergötland and Värend, being the last parts of Sweden where slavery had remained legal. This put an end to Medieval Swedish slavery – though it was only applicable within the borders of Sweden, which left an opening – used long afterwards – for the 17th- and 18th-century Swedish slave trade.

==== Marriage and succession ====
In 1335, Magnus married Blanche, daughter of John I, Marquis of Namur, and Marie of Artois, a descendant of Louis VIII of France. The wedding took place in October or early November 1335, possibly at Bohus castle. As a wedding gift Blanche received the province of Tunsberg in Norway and Lödöse in Sweden as fiefs. They had two sons, Erik and Haakon, plus at least two daughters who died in infancy and were buried at Ås Abbey.

On 21 July 1336, Magnus was crowned king of both Norway and Sweden in Stockholm. This caused further resentment in Norway, where the nobles and magnates desired a separate Norwegian coronation. A second rising by members of the high nobility of Norway ensued in 1338.

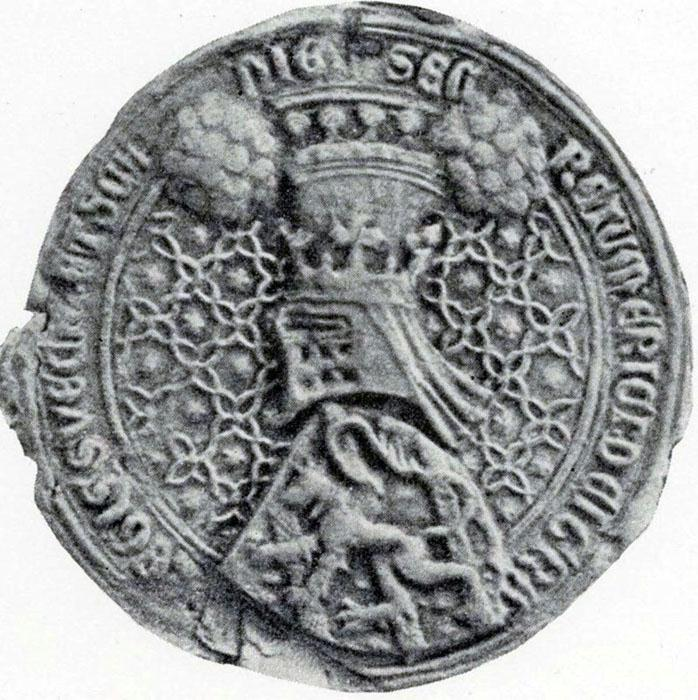
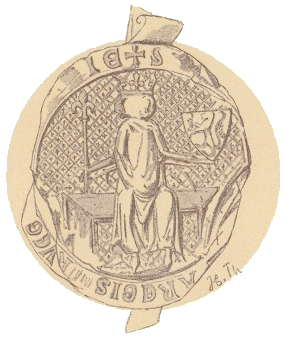
Seals of Magnus's sons Erik of Sweden (left) and Haakon VI of Norway (right)

Opposition to Magnus' rule in Norway led to a settlement between the king and the Norwegian nobility at Varberg on 15 August 1343. In violation of the Norwegian laws on royal inheritance, Magnus' younger son, Haakon, would become king of Norway, with Magnus as regent during his minority. Later the same year, it was declared that Magnus' elder son, Erik, would become king of Sweden on Magnus' death. Thus, the union between Norway and Sweden would be severed. This occurred when Haakon came of age in 1355.

=== Crusade against Novgorod ===
Russian chronicles describe that in 1347 Magnus invited the Novgorodians either to engage in a theological debate or to embrace his religion; however, they refused, and Magnus proceeded with his Neva campaign. In 1348, Magnus led a crusade against Novgorod, marching up the Neva, forcibly converting the tribes along that river, and briefly capturing the fortress of Orekhov for a second time, in August. The city of Pskov took advantage of the situation and was able to pressure Novgorod into granting the city its formal independence. The Novgorodians retook the fortress in February 1349 after a six-month siege, without the aid of Pskov and with minimal aid from Moscow. Magnus fell back, in large part due to the ravages of the plague farther West. While he spent much of 1351 trying to drum up support for further crusading action among the German cities in the Baltic States, he never returned to attack Novgorod.

=== Greenland expedition ===
In 1355, Magnus sent a ship (or ships) to Greenland to inspect its Western and Eastern Settlements. Sailors found settlements entirely Norse and Christian. The Greenland carrier (Groenlands Knorr) made the Greenland run at intervals till 1369, when she sank and was apparently not replaced.

=== Conflict with Erik ===
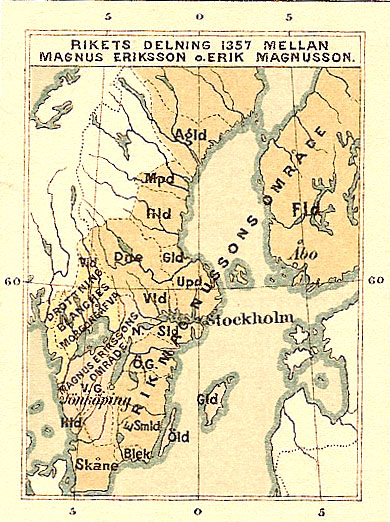
Historic map of when Sweden was divided between Magnus Eriksson and Erik Magnusson during 1357

Because of the increase in taxes to pay for the acquisition of the Scanian province, some Swedish nobles supported by the Church attempted to oust Magnus, setting up his elder son Erik as king. Erik died supposedly of the plague in 1359, with his wife Beatrix and their son.

=== Deposition and final years ===
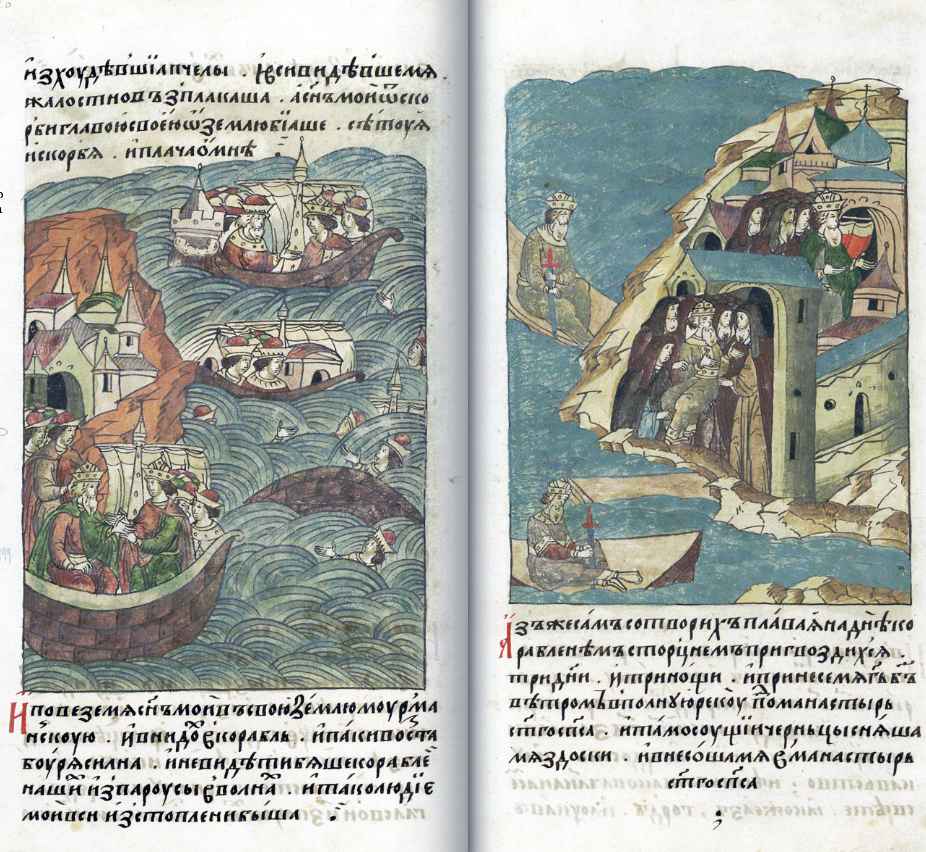
King Magnus's shipwreck from the Illustrated Chronicle of Ivan the Terrible

King Valdemar IV of Denmark reconquered Scania in 1360. He went on to conquer Gotland in 1361. On 27 July 1361, outside the city of Visby, the main city of Gotland, the final battle took place. It ended in a complete victory for Valdemar. Magnus had warned the inhabitants of Visby in a letter and started to gather troops to reconquer Scania. Valdemar went home to Denmark again in August and took a lot of plunder with him. Either in late 1361 or early 1362 the inhabitants of Visby raised themselves against the few Danish that Valdemar left behind and killed them.

In 1363, members of the Swedish Council of Aristocracy, led by Bo Jonsson Grip, arrived at the court of Mecklenburg. They had been banished from Sweden after a revolt against King Magnus. At the nobles' request, Albert of Mecklenburg launched an invasion of Sweden supported by several German dukes and counts. Several Hanseatic cities and dukes in Northern Germany expressed support of the new king. Stockholm and Kalmar, with large Hanseatic populations, also welcomed the intervention. Albert was proclaimed King of Sweden and crowned on 18 February 1364.

Magnus found refuge with his younger son in Norway. According to Icelandic annals, he drowned in a shipwreck at Lyngholmen in Bømlafjorden on 1 December 1374. He had retained his sovereignty over Iceland until his death.

== Reputation and legacy ==
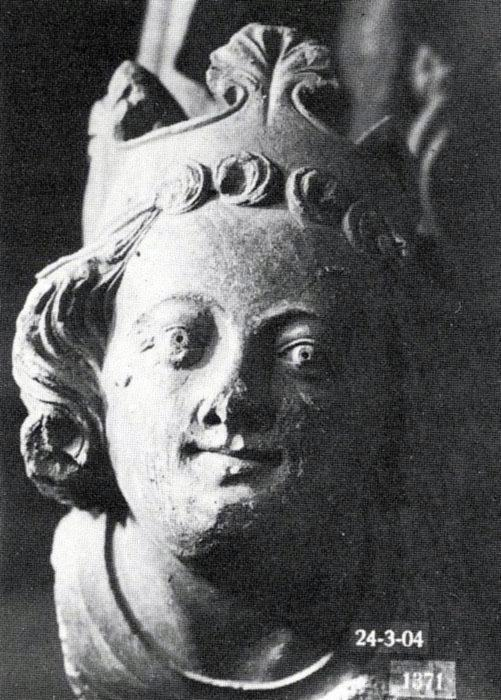
Head from Trondheim thought by Professor Jan Svanberg to be King Magnus

In spite of his many formal expansions, his rule was considered a period of decline both for Swedish royal power and for Sweden as a whole. Foreign powers such as Denmark (after its recovery in 1340) and Mecklenburg intervened, and Magnus appears to have been unable to counter the internal opposition that arose. He was regarded as a weak king and criticised for giving favourites too much power.

Magnus's young favourite courtier was Bengt Algotsson, whom he elevated to Duke of Finland and Halland, as well as Viceroy of Scania. Accusations of sexual relations between Magnus and men, including Algotsson, formed part of the political attacks directed against the king. Bridget of Sweden was among his most prominent critics, and historians Henric Bagerius and Christine Ekholst have interpreted her accusations of sodomy against Magnus in the context of the political conflict between the king and the aristocracy. There is no firm historical evidence that Magnus had a sexual relationship with Algotsson. The later epithet Magnus Smek has sometimes been associated with these allegations, although its meaning and origin are disputed. Olle Ferm has argued that smek was not originally a reference to homosexuality, but rather a derogatory term implying weakness, foolishness or naivety.

Later historiography has generally taken a more nuanced view of Magnus's reign. His reputation in Sweden was strongly influenced by the hostile tradition associated with Bridget of Sweden and by later chronicles written in political contexts unfavourable to him. The Svenskt biografiskt lexikon notes that his enemies effectively had the last word in shaping his early posthumous reputation, while Magnus appears to have been remembered more favourably in Norway and Iceland. From the eighteenth century onward, historians increasingly questioned the older hostile accounts. Sven Lagerbring rejected many of the traditional accusations against Magnus in 1776, and later Swedish, Norwegian and Finnish historians gave greater attention to the political difficulties he faced and to his achievements in legislation and government.

Despite the political difficulties of his later reign, Magnus left a substantial institutional, legal, and economic legacy. In 1335, he issued an ordinance abolishing thralldom, while other reforms concerned legal security, communications, royal administration and mining. During his reign, a commission was appointed to prepare a common law for the Swedish countryside, resulting in Magnus Erikssons landslag, while a corresponding national law for the towns was also developed. Economically, Magnus laid the foundation for Sweden's state-regulated mining industry by issuing charters for key resource districts, including Norberg and Stora Kopparberget in Falun. During the reign of Magnus, the Falun mine had grown into a vital national resource, and a large part of the revenue for the Swedish state in the coming centuries would come from the mine. Magnus visited the area personally in 1347 to grant a formal privilege charter for mining operations, securing state regulation, defining miners' rights, and ensuring a steady stream of revenue for the Crown. The Swedish History Museum characterises his early reign as a successful period of reform and identifies the abolition of slavery and the introduction of a common law code as measures with a lasting impact on Swedish history. His dominions also reached an exceptional extent: the Svenskt biografiskt lexikon notes that by 1343 Magnus had attained a position enjoyed by few Nordic monarchs, while the Swedish History Museum states that no Swedish king has ruled over a larger realm.

Russians drew up an allegedly autobiographical account known as the Testament of Magnus (Rukopisanie Magnusha) which was inserted into the Russian Sofia First Chronicle, composed in Novgorod; it claimed that Magnus did not, in fact, drown at sea, but saw the errors of his ways and converted to Orthodoxy, becoming a monk in a Novgorodian monastery in Karelia. The account is apocryphal.

== Popular culture ==
Most of the Kristin Lavransdatter trilogy by Sigrid Undset takes place in Norway during Magnus's reign. He appears in one scene, and is presented in a relatively critical manner.

== See also ==
- Unions of Sweden
- List of abolitionist forerunners

Magnus Eriksson House of Bjälbo Born: Spring of 1316 Died: 1 December 1374
Regnal titles
| Vacant Ingeborg's regency Title last held by Birger | King of Sweden; 1319–1364 with Erik XII (1356–1359); Haakon VI (1362–1364) | Succeeded by Albert |
| Preceded by Haakon V | King of Norway; 1319–1343 | Succeeded by Haakon VI |
