= 1306 =

1306 in various calendars
- Gregorian calendar: 1306; MCCCVI
- Ab urbe condita: 2059
- Armenian calendar: 755; ԹՎ ՉԾԵ
- Assyrian calendar: 6056
- Balinese saka calendar: 1227–1228
- Bengali calendar: 712–713
- Berber calendar: 2256
- English Regnal year: 34 Edw. 1 – 35 Edw. 1
- Buddhist calendar: 1850
- Burmese calendar: 668
- Byzantine calendar: 6814–6815
- Chinese calendar: 乙巳年 (Wood Snake); 4003 or 3796 — to — 丙午年 (Fire Horse); 4004 or 3797
- Coptic calendar: 1022–1023
- Discordian calendar: 2472
- Ethiopian calendar: 1298–1299
- Hebrew calendar: 5066–5067
- Hindu calendars
- Vikram Samvat: 1362–1363
- Shaka Samvat: 1227–1228
- Kali Yuga: 4406–4407
- Holocene calendar: 11306
- Igbo calendar: 306–307
- Iranian calendar: 684–685
- Islamic calendar: 705–706
- Japanese calendar: Kagen 4 / Tokuji 1 (徳治元年)
- Javanese calendar: 1217–1218
- Julian calendar: 1306; MCCCVI
- Korean calendar: 3639
- Minguo calendar: 606 before ROC 民前606年
- Nanakshahi calendar: −162
- Thai solar calendar: 1848–1849
- Tibetan calendar: ཤིང་མོ་སྦྲུལ་ལོ་ (female Wood-Snake); 1432 or 1051 or 279 — to — མེ་ཕོ་རྟ་ལོ་ (male Fire-Horse); 1433 or 1052 or 280

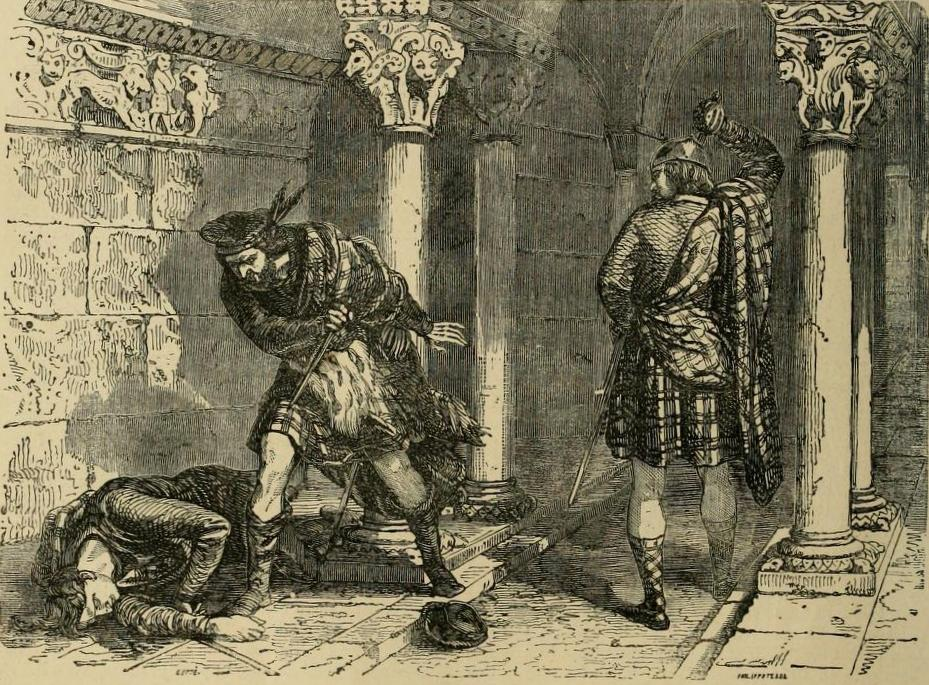
Death of John Comyn III by Robert the Bruce at Greyfriars Church (Dumfries).

Year 1306 (MCCCVI) was a common year starting on Saturday of the Julian calendar.

== Events ==
=== January – March ===
- January 3 – Deshou Khan, the only son of Chinese Emperor Chengzong of the Yuan dynasty (Temür Khan) dies, leaving the Mongol Emperor without an heir.
- January 27 – The University of Orléans is created by a papal bull issued by Pope Clement V endowing the Orléans institutes in France with the title and privileges of a university.
- January 28 – After two hearings, Sunni Muslim theologian Ibn Taymiyyah is found innocent of charges of heresy by the Indian Qur'an scholar Safi al-Din al-Hindi. Taymiyyah is found guilty three months later by a panel of judges in the Mamluk state and imprisoned for four months.
- February 10 – Robert the Bruce murders John Comyn III, Scottish nobleman and political rival, before the high altar of the Greyfriars Church at Dumfries. Bruce and Comyn meet to discuss their differences at the church (without their swords). An argument between the two ensues, and Bruce draws his dagger in anger and stabs Comyn. He flees the church, telling his followers outside what has occurred. Roger de Kirkpatrick, cousin of Bruce, goes back inside and finishes off the seriously wounded Comyn. In response, Bruce is excommunicated by Pope Clement V.
- March 21 – In France, Hugh V, at the age of 11, becomes the new Duke of Burgundy upon the death of his father, Robert II.
- March 25 – Robert the Bruce is crowned king of Scotland by Bishop William de Lamberton at Scone, near Perth. Despite lacking the traditional coronation stone, diadem and scepter, all of which have transferred to London. During the ceremony, the Scottish nobles of Atholl, Lennox, Mar and Menteith are present – while the 18-year-old Elizabeth de Burgh is crowned queen of Scots. The coronation takes place in defiance of the English claims of suzerainty after King Edward I of England, strips John de Baliol of his crown as King of Scots.

=== April – June ===
- April 26 – French knight Amalric, Lord of Tyre, with the aid of the Knights Templar, stages a Coup d'état against his older brother Henry II, King of Cyprus. Although Henry remains the nominal king, he is confined at the Cypriot city of Strovolos, and Amalric assumes all of the King's powers. Amalric will be assassinated in 1310.
- May 5 – Charles the Lame, King of Naples, accuses Philip I of Piedmont and Isabella of Villehardouin of disloyalty, and deprives them of the right to rule the Principality of Achaea (located in southern Greece on the Peloponnese peninsula). King Charles awards Achaea to his son, Philip I, Prince of Taranto.
- May 13 – (29 Shawwal 705 AH) A Moorish Nasrid fleet sent by Sultan Sultan Muhammad III of the Emirate of Granada (now part of Spain) makes a surprise attack on Africa and captures Ceuta. Nasrid forces land in Ksar es-Seghir, Larache, and Asilah, occupying these Atlantic ports (→ Battle of the Strait). At the same time, Prince Uthman ibn Abi al-Ula of the Marinid Sultanate, leads a rebellion against Sultan Abu Yaqub Yusuf an-Nasr. He conquers a mountainous area in northern Morocco and allies himself with Granada.
- May 22 – Feast of the Swans: At Westminster Abbey King Edward I of England proclaims that all squires, who agree to march in an invasion of Scotland, will be knighted. After the feast, the King has two swans brought in and swears "before God and the swans" to avenge the murder of Lord John Comyn III of Badenoch, the desecration of Greyfriars Church in Dumfries by Robert Bruce, and to fight the infidels in the Holy Land. The King knights his son, Prince Edward of Caernarfon. The Prince knights 266 other men. King Edward then gives his "Raise the Dragon" orders, proclaiming that no mercy is to be granted to Scotland, and all Scots taken in arms are to be executed without trial. Among the persons knighted, the King appoints Aymer de Valance, lieutenant for Scotland. Valence will make his base at Perth, along with Henry Percy and Robert Clifford, to organize an army.
- May 30 – The English Parliament meets at Westminster in a one-day session, on orders of King Edward I, a week after Whit Sunday and passes a five percent tax on "citizens and burgesses and communities of all the cities and boroughs of the realm and the tenants of our demesne."
- June 8 – After bringing the Flemish War to a victorious conclusion, King Philip IV of France orders the silver content of new livre coins to be raised back to the 1285 level of 3.96 grams of silver, and orders the devaluation of the coins of 1303, 1304 and 1305 to one-third of their face value. The economic decree leads to rioting.
- June 19 – Battle of Methven: Scottish forces (some 5,000 men) under Robert the Bruce are defeated by the English army at Methven. During the battle, the Scots are overwhelmed by a surprise attack on their camp. They are outnumbered, but Bruce manages to form a phalanx to break free. Finally, he is forced to retreat, leaving many of his followers dead or soon to be executed.
- June 23 – The Knights Hospitaller, led by Grand Master Foulques de Villaret, land with 600 men on the island of Rhodes, one of the Dodecanese Islands off of the coast of Byzantium, and begin a four-year long war to capture the fortified city of Rhodes (which will not fall until August 15, 1310).

=== July – September ===
- July 22 – The Great Exile of 1306: King Philip IV of France turns his attentions to Italian bankers and orders the Jews to be exiled in France. The Jewish quarter in Paris is cleared and goods are confiscated – to regain money spent on expanding the domains of Flanders and Gascony. Meanwhile, rumors of a secret initiation ceremony of the Knights Templar create distrust, and Philip – while being deeply in debt to the Order for loans from his war against England, uses this distrust for political and religious motivations against the Templars.
- August 4 – King Wenceslaus III of Bohemia is assassinated at the age of 16 after a reign of only 14 months, being stabbed to death at Olomouc (now in the Czech Republic), bringing an end to the Přemyslid dynasty. His sister Anne of Bohemia administers the nation until her husband Henry of Carinthia is elected as the new King of Bohemia by the Bohemian nobles.
- August 11 – Battle of Dalrigh: Robert the Bruce is defeated by rival Scottish forces (some 1,000 men) led by John the Lame of Argyll chieftain and uncle of John Comyn the Red of the Clan MacDougall at Dalrigh (known as "King's Field"). ("After the defeat which Robert Bruce experienced in Perthshire from Edward I, soon after his coronation at Scone, he was endeavoring to make his way toward the West Highlands with a few followers, when, on the 11th of August 1306, he was encountered at a place, since called Dalrigh (the King's field) near Tyndrum, on the border of Argyllshire, by that powerful chief, or rather potentate, Allaster or Alexander MacDougall of Argyll...") During the battle, Bruce himself narrowly escapes capture and takes with the remnants refuge in the mountains of Atholl (Scottish Highlands).
- September 13 – In Scotland, English forces under Edward of Caernarfon capture and sack Kildrummy Castle in Aberdeenshire. Edward takes Elizabeth de Burgh, Christina Bruce and Mary Bruce (sisters of Robert the Bruce), and Princess Marjorie Bruce (daughter of Bruce) as prisoners. He executes Nigel de Brus (younger brother of Bruce) for high treason, who is later hanged, drawn and quartered at Berwick.
- September 20 – The Knights Hospitaller, besieging on the island of Rhodes, capture the Feraklos Castle.
- September 29 – The Hatuna Games are played in Sweden. Duke's Eric Magnusson and Valdemar Magnusson, arrive at the estate of their brother, King Birger Magnusson, by Lake Malar. They are invited as guests at a feast, but during the night Birger and his wife, Martha of Denmark, are captured by the two brothers and are imprisoned in the dungeon at Nyköping Castle – while Eric and Valdemar jointly take over the Swedish throne.

=== October – December ===
- October 9 – Robert FitzWalter, 1st Baron FitzWalter is pardoned of all debts owed to King Edward I of England, in honor of his service in the war against the Scots.
- October 16 – In a ceremony at Prague, King Rudolf I of Bohemia marries Elizabeth Richeza, the widow of Rudolf's predecessor, King Wenceslaus II of Bohemia.
- October 23 – James Stewart, 5th High Steward of Scotland, after having been defeated in battle by King Edward of England, swears fealty to King Edward again at Lanercost Priory. To render his oath inviolable, Stewart's oath is taken upon the two crosses of Scotland most esteemed for their sanctity, the holy gospels and on various relics of saints. Stewart agrees to submit to instant excommunication if he should break his oath of allegiance to Edward.
- November 3 – From Lanercost Prior, King Edward of England summons Parliament to meet in Carlisle, starting on January 20, "to "treat of the ordering and settling of the land of Scotland."
- December 6 – The monetary policy of King Philip IV of France triggers a revolt in Paris. The provost's house is burned, and King Philip the Fair has to flee to the fortress of the Temple.

=== By location ===
- Winter – Robert the Bruce retires to the Isle of Rathlin with a small group of followers, including Bruce's brothers Edward, Thomas and Alexander, as well James Douglas, Niall mac Cailein and Malcolm II. He is welcomed by the Irish Bissett family and stays at Rathlin Castle (or "Bruce's Castle"). Robert reorganizes his resources and musters troops for the campaign in Scotland.

==== Asia ====
- Mongol invasion of India: Mongol forces invade the Delhi Sultanate, Sultan Alauddin Khalji sends an army under Malik Kafur to deal with the invaders and defeats them at the banks of the Ravi River. The Delhi army kills and captures many Mongols in their pursuit. Alauddin orders the survivors to be trampled under the feet of elephants.

=== By topic ===
==== Economy ====
- In London, a city ordinance decrees that heating with coal is forbidden when Parliament is in session (the ordinance is not particularly effective).

==== Religion ====
- Storkyrkan, the current cathedral of Stockholm, is consecrated.

== Births ==
- August 8 – Rudolf the Blind, Duke of Bavaria (d. 1353)
- Ashikaga Tadayoshi, Japanese nobleman, samurai and general (d. 1352)
- Isabella of Brienne, Latin noblewoman (suo jure) and claimant (d. 1360)
- Sasaki Takauji, Japanese bureaucrat, warrior, poet and writer (d. 1373)

== Deaths ==
- February 10 – John Comyn the Red, Scottish nobleman (b. 1274)
- March – Araniko ("Anige"), Nepalese court architect and painter (b. 1245)
- March 21 – Robert II, French nobleman (House of Burgundy) (b. 1248).
- May 5 – Constantine Palaiologos, Byzantine prince and general (b. 1261)
- August 4 – Wenceslaus III, king of Hungary, Croatia and Poland (b. 1289)
- September 12 – An Hyang, Korean scholar and philosopher (b. 1243)
- September 21 – Wonbi Hong, Korean noblewoman and royal consort
- September 22 – John of Paris, French scholar, theologian and writer
- November 7 – John of Strathbogie, Scottish nobleman and Justiciar
- December 6 – Roger Bigod, English nobleman, knight and Marshal
- December 12 – Conrad of Offida, Italian monk and preacher (b. 1241)
- December 25 – Jacopone da Todi, Italian monk and mystic (b. 1230)
