= Ingeborg Magnusdotter =

Queen of Denmark from 1296 to 1319

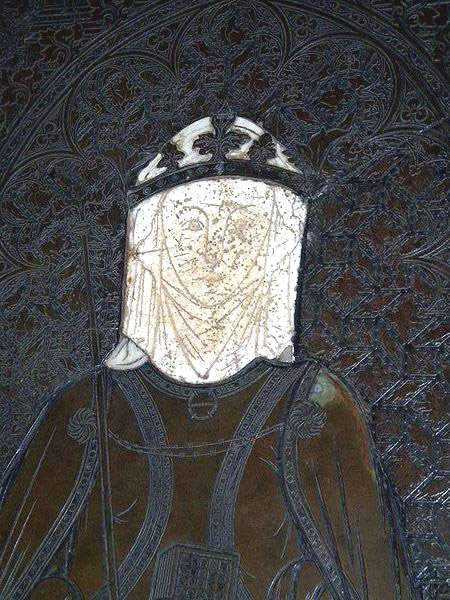
- Sculpted image of Queen Ingeborg on her tomb

Queen consort of Denmark
- Tenure: 1296–1319
- Born: c. 1277; Sweden
- Died: 5 April or 15 August 1319; Convent of St. Clare, Roskilde
- Burial: St. Bendt's Church, Ringsted
- Spouse: Eric VI of Denmark
- House: House of Bjälbo
- Father: Magnus Ladulås
- Mother: Helvig of Holstein

Ingeborg Magnusdotter (1277 – 5 April or 15 August 1319) was Queen of Denmark by marriage to King Eric VI. She was the daughter of King Magnus Ladulås of Sweden and Helvig of Holstein.

== Life ==
Ingeborg was born a daughter of King Magnus Ladulås of Sweden and Helvig of Holstein.

In 1288, she was engaged to marry to King Eric Menved of Denmark, a marriage which took place in Helsingborg in 1296. The marriage was as a part of dynastic policies: in 1298, her brother king Birger of Sweden married her husband's sister, Princess Martha of Denmark. The dispensation necessary for the marriage was not obtained until 1297 because of the conflict between her spouse and the archbishop Jens Grand.

=== Queen ===
Queen Ingeborg was described as beautiful and tender; songs describe how she asked for a prison amnesty at her wedding, and contemporary songs both in Denmark and Sweden praise her for her compassion and sense of justice. She was a popular queen in Denmark, where she was referred to as "gode Frue" or 'the Good Lady'.

There is no information that she ever played any political role. Her husband was the ally of her eldest brother, King Birger, and her husband's sister queen Martha of Sweden during the Swedish throne conflicts: they received their son in 1306 after the Håtuna games, and later Birger and Martha themselves as refugees after the Nyköping Banquet in 1318.

She had eight sons who died as children, as well as six miscarriages, although the sources differ between eight and fourteen children: whatever the case, her many pregnancies led to miscarriages, or the birth of children who died soon after.

In 1318, Queen Ingeborg gave birth to a son who lived, which was a cause of great celebrations after so many miscarriages. However, when the queen showed off the infant to the public from her carriage, the carriage suddenly broke and fell over, during which the infant fell from her grip, broke his neck and died.

There is some evidence that she may have borne one last son with Erik VI after the tragic death of that infant, named Erik Sjællandsfar (ca. 1300–1364) who is buried at Orebygård on Zealand, buried in Roskilde Cathedral with a crown, although this cannot be confirmed completely.

=== Later life ===
After the accidental death of her infant son, she entered the St. Catherine's Priory, Roskilde. The reason for this is questionable. One version claims that she did this voluntarily; either because of sorrow for the death of her son, or alternatively, because of her grief caused by the deaths of her brothers, Erik Magnusson and Valdemar Magnusson.

According to another legend, she was forcibly confined to the convent by her husband, who blamed her for the death of their son. According to another version, he had her imprisoned for being too involved in the political causes of her brothers.

Regardless of whether she was a guest or a prisoner of the monastery, it is known that she had been the benefactor of this particular convent prior to entering it.

In 1319, she allegedly foretold her own death and those of her spouse and the archbishop. She died soon after, followed by her husband.

She was buried in St. Bendt's Church, Ringsted with the inscription:

"I, Ingeborg of Sweden, once queen of Denmark, ask for forgiveness from anyone to whom I may have caused sorrow, to be please to forgive me and to remember my soul. I died in the year of Our Lord 1319."

Ingeborg Magnusdotter House of Bjälbo Born: 1277 Died: 1319
Danish royalty
Preceded by Agnes of Brandenburg	Queen consort of Denmark; 1296–1319	Succeeded by Euphemia of Pomerania
