= Nyköping Banquet =

1317 Christmas celebration in Sweden

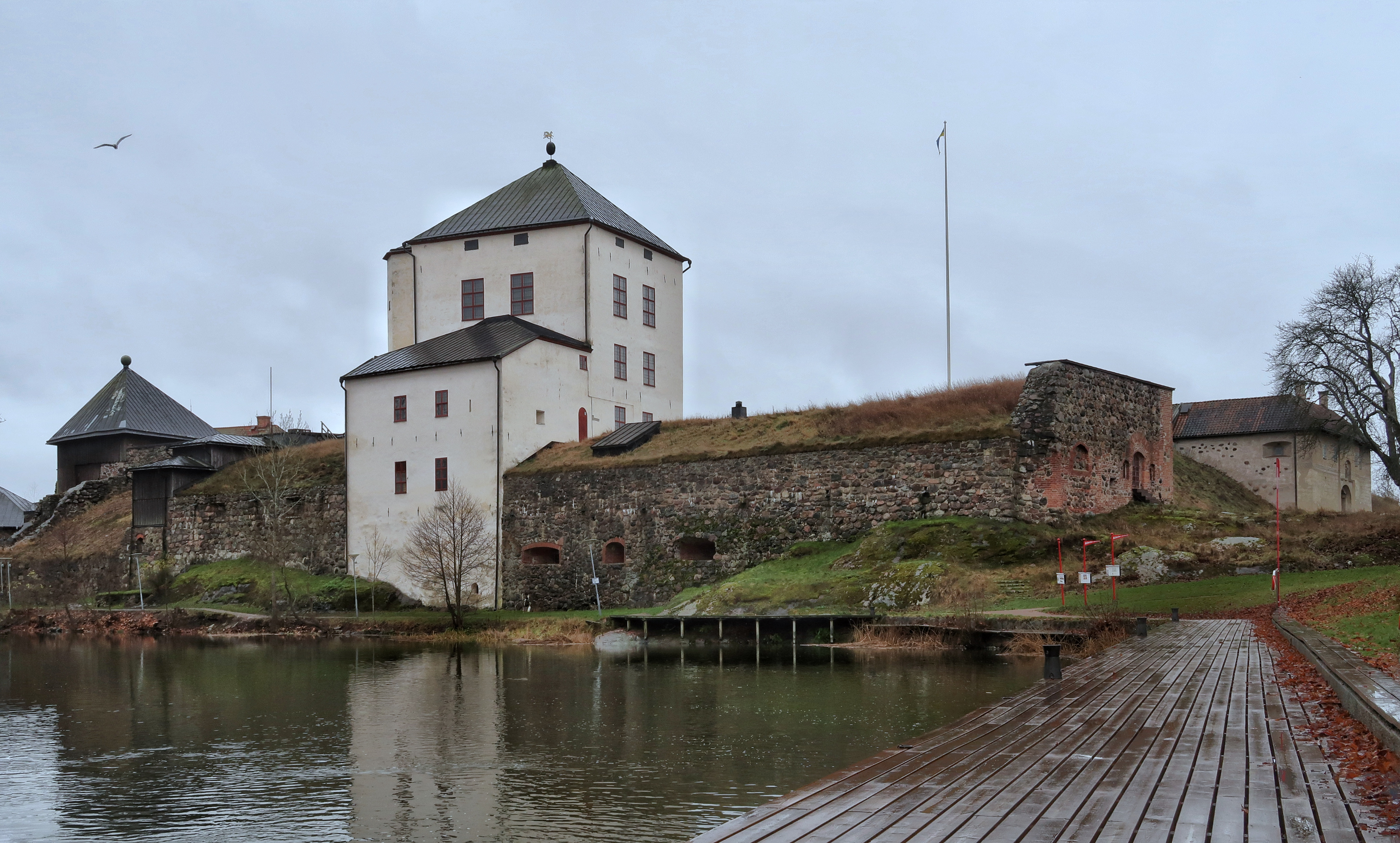
Present-day appearance of Nyköping Castle, in which the Dukes were starved to death.

The Nyköping Banquet (Swedish: Nyköpings gästabud) was King Birger of Sweden's Christmas celebration 11 December 1317 at Nyköping Castle in Sweden. Among the guests were his two brothers Duke Valdemar and Duke Eric, who later that night were imprisoned and have been assumed to have subsequently starved to death in the dungeon of Nyköping Castle. The principal source to these events is the very biased Eric Chronicle. The author Vilhelm Moberg called it "a Shakespearean episode" in his work Min svenska historia.

== Background ==
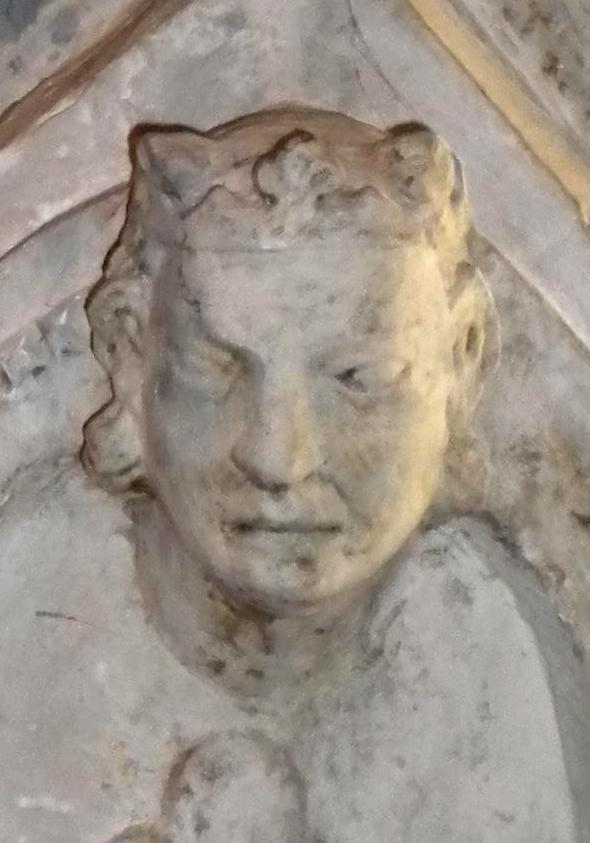
King Birger

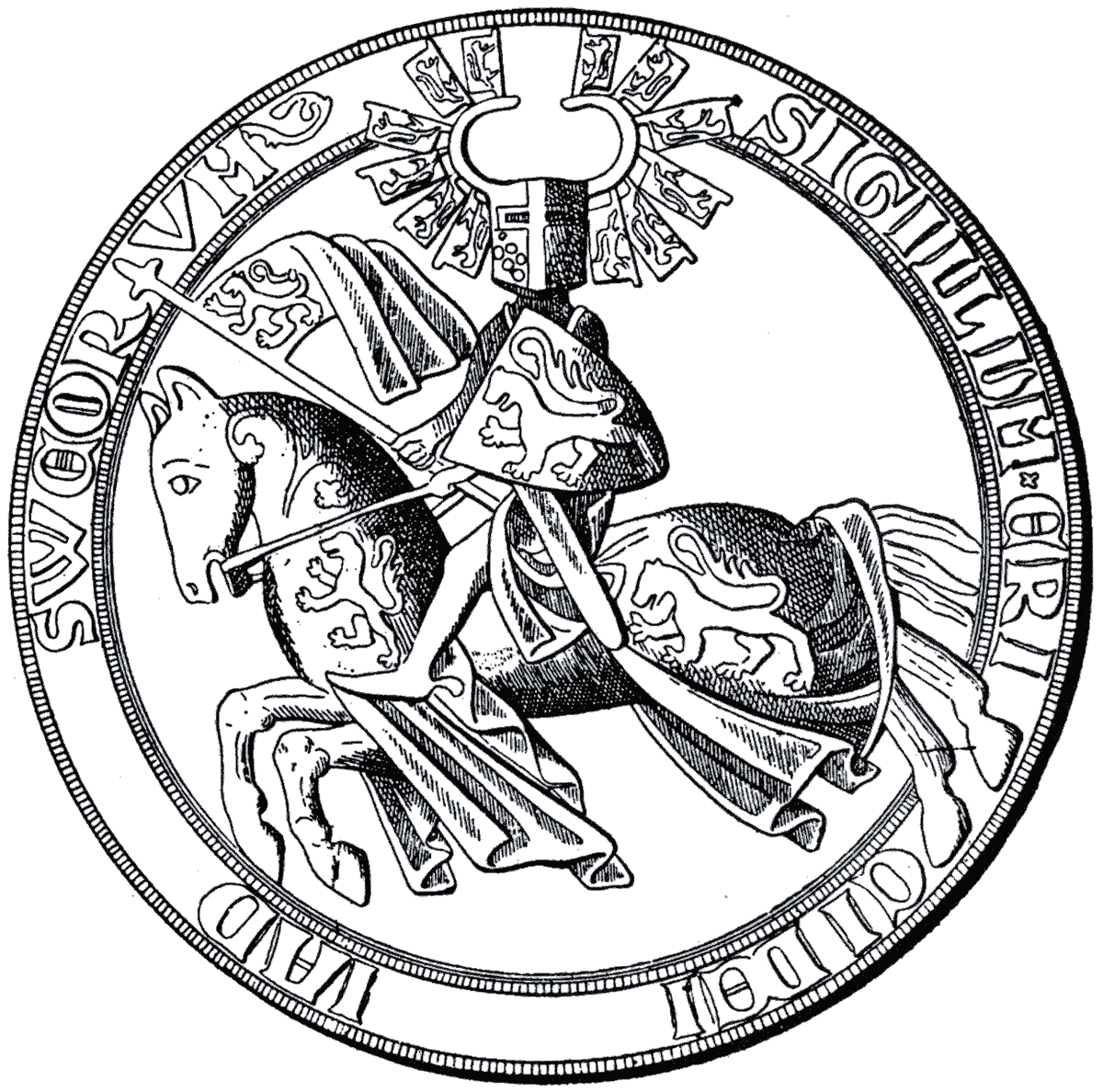
Duke Eric's seal

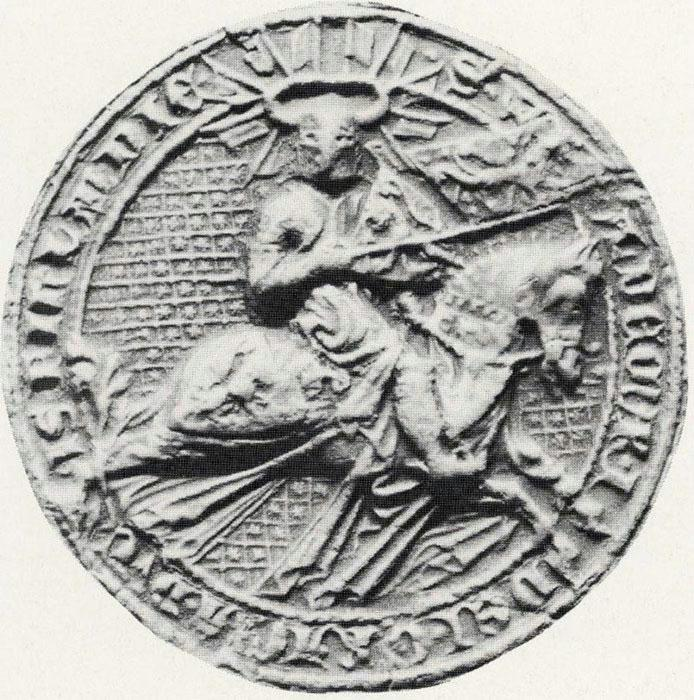
Duke Waldemar's seal

King Magnus Ladulås died in 1290, leaving three minor sons. Birger Magnusson was the successor to the throne, but was only ten years old. In this time Sweden was governed by a council of regents, led by Birger's guardian, marshal Torgils Knutsson. Even after Birger reached majority and married Martha of Denmark, King Erik Menved's daughter, Torgils remained the real ruler of the realm. In 1302 Birger was crowned king in Söderköping and he came into the inheritance of his father. His brothers Eric and Valdemar became dukes of Södermanland, and of parts of Uppland and Finland, respectively. It is probably only at this time that Birger gained any real political power, even if the regency led by Torgils still had some control.

The relations between king Birger and his two brothers were strained, since Eric in particular sought after the throne for himself. He soon became a leading force in the opposition to Torgils. In 1304 Birger and Torgils demanded loyalty oaths to the king and the marshal from Eric and Valdemar. The two brothers fled to Norway, where Eric gained control of the county of Kungahälla and northern Halland due to his betrothal to the Norwegian king's daughter Ingeborg. Eric and Valdemar plotted a rebellion against Birger and carried out raids into Sweden. Despite receiving support from Norway, they had to admit defeat at the treaty of Kolsäter in 1305. The three brothers then reconciled and later that year Birger had marshal Torgils arrested. The following year, 1306, Torgils was executed after accusations of treason.

However, Eric and Valdemar turned on Birger again and staged a coup against him (the Håtuna games). After an intervention by the Danish and Norwegian kings, a settlement was reached in 1310 and Sweden was divided among the brothers into three sovereign states. The dukes received the western parts of Sweden, with the exception of the castles Tre Kronor in Stockholm, Kalmar Castle and Borgholm Castle. Duke Eric received as hereditary domain the provinces of Västergötland, Dalsland, and Värmland. The authority of Birger was not acknowledged in these territories. Eric was son-in-law to Norway's king Håkan Magnusson, and aimed to gain the Norwegian throne. The parts of the realm assigned to the dukes, as well as those assigned to the king, were treated as a shared inheritance. Should one of the dukes die without heirs, the surviving duke would inherit his lands. Eric's realm has been called "the only truly feodal arrangement that has ever existed in Sweden" by Michael Nordberg While the greater part of the Swedish realm was now under Eric's control, King Birger desired to reunite the whole realm under his rule.

== The Banquet according to the Eric Chronicle ==
During a journey to Kalmar in the autumn of 1317, Duke Valdemar was invited to celebrate Christmas with King Birger and Queen Martha at Nyköping Castle, together with the royal court. Duke Valdemar stayed overnight and was treated royally, according to the Eric Chronicle. Valdemar was positively surprised by the king's new demeanour. He convinced his brother Eric to come to the Christmas feast.

The banquet was held on the night between 10 and 11 December 1317. When the dukes arrived at the castle, they were received by the king himself. He took them by the hand, and led them into the castle with fair words. Even Queen Martha was happy and excited. The dukes' retinues were lodged not in the castle, but in the town of Nyköping, the pretext being lack of space. When the last of the duke's men had left the castle gate, it was locked shut.

After the dukes had retired to bed, the king's drots Brunke (Johan von Brunkow) arrived with a company of crossbowmen and handcuffed them. According to the Eric Chronicle, King Birger himself was present, reminding the dukes of the Håtuna Games:

Mynnes jder nakot aff hatwna leek? Fulgörla mynnes han mik
(Remember ye aught of the Håtuna Games? I remember them clearly)

The following morning, the dukes' retinues were also apprehended.

== Imprisonment ==
The dukes were imprisoned in the castle's dungeon, with neck irons tethering them to the stone walls. The Eric Chronicle states that now that Birger's plan had come to fruition, he clapped his hands together delightedly, laughed loudly, and behaved like a madman. He exclaimed: "Now I have Sweden in my hand!"

After five weeks in the dungeon, the brothers knew that no mercy would be forthcoming from Birger, and had their wills drawn up. These documents, dated 18 January 1318 and which survive to this day, grant money to churches, monasteries, and hospitals, for the salvation of their souls. One of the executors was Birger Persson, the lawspeaker in Uppland. Soon thereafter, both dukes died in the dungeon. It is not clear how they died; they may have been murdered or starved to death.

Meanwhile, King Birger attempted to take Stockholm, but failed, having misjudged the political situation in the country. Despite help from Denmark, Birger could not stop a rebellion that broke out in support of the dukes, led by the aforementioned Birger Persson and Mats Kettilmundsson. According to legend, when he realized he had no way to prevail, King Birger threw the keys to the dungeon into the Nyköping river. A large medieval key was indeed found during the 19th century near the castle.

Birger was forced to flee to Gotland with Martha, whence he soon had to continue his flight to Denmark.

== Aftermath ==
Following a year of regency by his mother Duchess Ingeborg, the three-year-old son of Duke Eric, Magnus, was elected King in 1319 at the Stones of Mora in Uppland. King Birger's son Magnus resisted forces that tried to take Nyköping Castle but was defeated and fled with the senechal Brunke. They lost a sea action and were captured and executed in Stockholm in 1320. Brunke was executed on a sandy ridge which has since been known as the Brunkeberg Esker; the heir apparent was decapitated on the Isle of the Holy Spirit where the Riksdag Building is today. The deposed king Birger died in 1321 in exile in Denmark.

Thus, of the royal family, there remained only the old queen mother Helvig of Holstein, (widow of Magnus Ladulås), the exiled Queen Martha, the young king Magnus Eriksson, his sister Euphemia, their mother Ingeborg and her cousin Duchess Ingeborg of Öland (widow of Duke Valdemar).

== See also ==
- Black Dinner
