= Martha of Denmark =

Queen of Sweden from 1298 to 1318

Queen consort of Sweden
- Tenure: 1298–1318
- Coronation: 2 December 1302
- Born: 1277–1280/1282; Denmark
- Died: 2 March 1341; St. Peter's Abbey, Næstved
- Burial: St. Bendt's Church, Ringsted
- Spouse: Birger of Sweden
- House: House of Estridsen
- Father: Eric V of Denmark
- Mother: Agnes of Brandenburg

Martha of Denmark (after 1277 – 2 March or 3 October 1341) was Queen of Sweden by marriage to King Birger. She was the daughter of King Eric V of Denmark and sister of King Eric VI. She was given the name Margrete at birth, but in Sweden was called Märta, and has been known to history by that name. She was a politically influential queen and an important figure in the Håtuna games and the Nyköping Banquet.

== Life ==
=== Early life ===
Martha, the daughter of King Eric V of Denmark and Agnes of Brandenburg and the sister of King Eric VI, was born sometime between 1277 and 1282. Her elder brother Christopher was born in 1277, and by 1282, peaceful relations had been restored between Denmark and Sweden, leading to agreement that Princess Martha would marry Prince Birger, the heir to the Swedish throne. According to Petrus Olai, this agreement was made as early as 1280. The papal dispensation for the marriage, necessary due to the previous family ties, was obtained in 1284. The alliance between the royal dynasties of Denmark and Sweden was further strengthened in 1288, when a marriage agreement was made in Helsingborg between Martha's brother, King Eric VI, and her future sister-in-law, Ingeborg Magnusdotter. Their marriage was celebrated in 1296.

According to the Erikskrönikan, Martha left Denmark already after her engagement was declared, and spent the rest of her childhood raised at the Swedish royal court until her wedding. It is not known exactly when she left Denmark, but it is considered likely that she did so prior to the death of her father in 1286.

=== Queen ===
The wedding between Martha and Birger was celebrated in Stockholm 25 November 1298. The wedding celebrations are described as very elaborate, with a procession of knights, amateur theater by nobles and the king naming his brothers dukes. She was praised when she asked for no dower other than the freedom of Magnus Algotsson, a noble arrested for involvement in an abduction of a bride in 1288. Regardless, she was given a dower land consisting of Fjärdhundraland (Western Uppland) and Enköping as her personal fief, which was granted to her in 1300. She was crowned Queen of Sweden in Söderköping 2 December 1302.

Märta and Birger grew up together; their marriage is described as a happy one, and she is credited with a large influence over him and the affairs of state and is described as politically active. In 1304, Queen Martha as well as her sister-in-law Queen Ingeborg attended the border meeting between King Birger and her brother King Eric at Knäred or Fagerdala. At this occasion, her eldest son Magnus was proclaimed heir to the throne.

On 29 September 1306, Martha and Birger were invited to festivities and then captured by the king's brothers Duke Eric and Duke Valdemar, during the so-called Håtuna games. They were held captive at Nyköping Castle, while the dukes seized power. Two of their sons and a daughter were imprisoned with them, while their eldest son Magnus managed to escape to Denmark. In a treaty between her brother, the King of Denmark, and the dukes the following year, her brothers-in-law guaranteed her possession of her dower, and in 1308, Martha and Birger were released.

Queen Martha reportedly played a significant part in the famous Nyköping Banquet in 1317, where the king and queen retaliated against the dukes and had the king's brothers invited to festivities, after which they were imprisoned and died in the dungeons; she is in fact pointed out as the creator of the plot. According to Erikskrönikan, Queen Martha and the king's official Johan Brunkow initiated the arrest of the dukes, while the chronicle of Lübeck claims that she influenced Birger supported by her brother the King of Denmark. Erikskrönikan describes how the queen received her brothers-in-law with assurances that she loved them as if they were her brothers by blood. The chronicle mentions her participating in the festivities: "Everyone danced all the way from indoors to outdoors; the queen had never looked so happy before". Her good mood was seen as a cruel sign of excitement that she and her spouse were to have their revenge for the Håtuna games, as she was aware of the plan to capture the dukes in the middle of the festivities.

The murder of the dukes, however, led to a conflict with the forces of their widows, who defeated the king's forces in 1318. This forced the king and queen to flee to Gotland, and from there to Zealand in Denmark. Magnus, the eldest son of Queen Martha and heir to the throne, remained behind to lead the defense against the dukes' men but was captured and imprisoned. He was later executed by beheading after the son of one of the dukes was proclaimed king of Sweden.

=== Exile ===
In Denmark, Birger and Martha were accompanied by their daughters Agnes and Katarina. On 4 September 1318, King Eric of Denmark granted Martha the manor of Hjarup in Jutland for her income. The following year, her brother Eric died and was succeeded by her younger brother Christopher II of Denmark, with whom she was reportedly not on as good terms as with her elder brother, possibly because Christopher had earlier sided with Birger's brothers against Eric. Christopher II granted Martha and Birger the manor of Spegerborg in Skælskør on Zealand, along with two parishes.

Martha was widowed in 1321. It appears that she was forced to accompany King Christopher when he was exiled to Germany in 1326 and was unable to return for three years. In 1329, she was guaranteed the return of her property. After Christopher II's death in 1332, Denmark was disrupted by interregnum. Nothing is known of Martha during these years, but at some point during her later years, she retired to St. Peder's Priory in Naestved in Zealand.

Her second son Erik died in exile in 1319. The chronicles therefore almost only mention the two daughters of the royal couple, Agnes and Katarina. Nothing is known about the younger daughter Katarina, and the only recorder detail about the eldest daughter, Agnes, is that the King of Denmark donated lands to Slangerup Abbey for her upkeep in 1344.

She was buried in St. Bendt's Church in Ringsted.

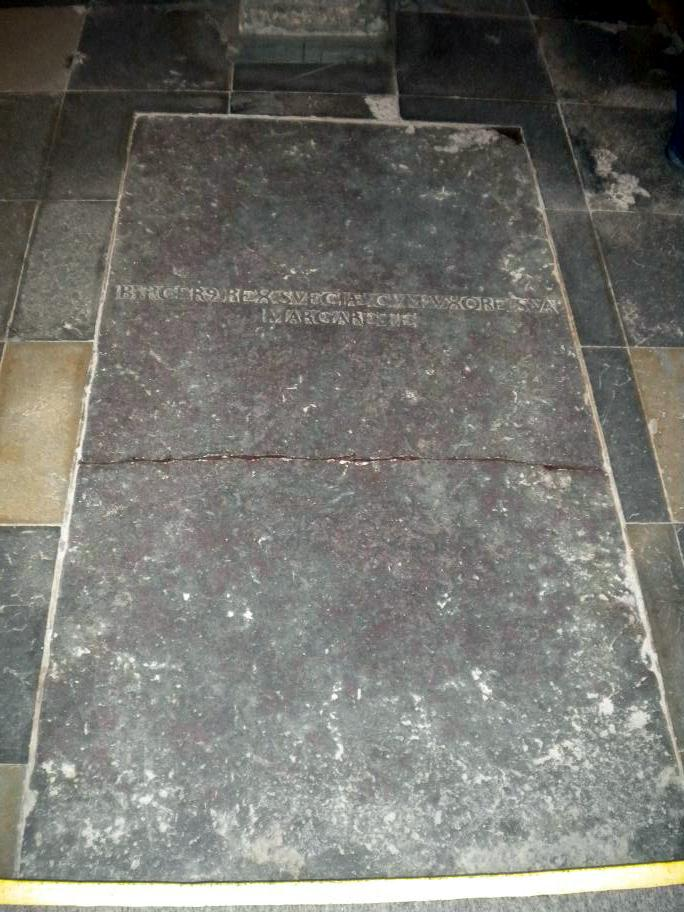
Gravestone from 1582 for Margaret and her husband Birger at St. Bendt's Church in Ringsted (not placed upon the actual grave)

== Issue ==
The following children of Martha and Birger are known:

- Magnus (1300–1320), heir to the throne; executed in Sweden
- Erik (d. 1319), archdeacon in Uppsala; died in exile
- Third son of unknown name
- Agnes (d. after 1344), a nun in Slangerup Abbey
- Katarina (d. after 1320); accompanied Birger and Martha in exile

== Notes ==
Märta Eriksdotter Born: 1277 Died: 1341
Swedish royalty
Vacant Title last held by Helvig of Holstein	Queen consort of Sweden; 1298–1318	Vacant Title next held by Blanche of Namur
