= Magnus Birgersson (1300–1320) =

Heir to King Birger of Sweden

- Born: September 1300; Tre Kronor Castle
- Died: 1 June 1320 (aged 19); Helgeandsholmen
- Parents: Birger, King of Sweden (father); Martha of Denmark (mother)

Magnus Birgersson (September 1300 – 1 June 1320) was the eldest son of King Birger Magnusson of Sweden. He was hailed as the heir to the Swedish throne and became embroiled in the power struggles between his father and his uncles, dukes Erik and Valdemar, who had rebelled against King Birger.

In 1317, King Birger imprisoned his brothers, Erik and Valdemar, during the infamous Nyköping Banquet and had them killed in 1318. This led to a rebellion by their supporters. While Birger fled the country, Magnus was captured by his father's enemies. In 1319, King Birger was deposed and Magnus Eriksson, Magnus Birgersson's cousin, was elected King of Sweden. Magnus Birgersson was subsequently executed on Helgeandsholmen in Stockholm in 1320.

== Election as future king of Sweden ==
Magnus Birgersson was born in 1300 at Tre Kronor Castle in Stockholm as the eldest son of King Birger of Sweden and Queen Märta, daughter of King Erik Klipping of Denmark. His parents had married in 1298, and Magnus had four younger siblings: a brother Erik and three sisters, of whom only Agnes and Katarina are known by name.

Magnus' position as the heir to the throne was confirmed when he was just a child. According to Ericus Olai, King Birger's brothers, Dukes Erik and Valdemar, together with bishops and councilors, sealed a letter on 24 June 1303 confirming Magnus' selection as the future king. In the summer of 1304, he was elected heir to the throne by Swedish prelates, nobles and peasants at a meeting in Fagerdala.

Erik and Valdemar had received separate fiefs in connection with Birger's coronation in 1302, but they were not content with their position. In 1304, a conflict between Birger and his brothers broke out, and the dukes fled to Norway, where they were welcomed by King Haakon. In response, Birger confiscated their duchies in Sweden. However, King Haakon donated them Kungaälv at the Norwegian-Swedish border as a fief, and from there, the dukes waged open war against Birger. The dukes were initially successful, but Birger managed to gain upper hand with Danish troops, and the dukes were forced to submit in February 1305. They formally approved Magnus as the heir in a letter from Herrevad Abbey on September 14, 1305.

== Håtuna game and shifting alliances ==
On September 29, 1306, in an event known as the Håtuna game, Erik and Valdemar captured Birger and Märta and three of their children at Birger's estate in Håtuna, Uppland. According to Erikskrönikan, the six-year-old Magnus was rescued by a squire from Småland and carried in his back to Denmark where he was taken up by his maternal uncle, King Erik Menved. King Birger joined him after being released by Erik and Valdemar in April 1308.

After 1308, the alliances between the Scandinavian rulers shifted. Previously, the dukes had been supported by the Norwegian King Haakon, who had also promised his young daughter Ingeborg (born 1301) to Duke Erik. The throne of Norway was at stake in this betrothal, since Haakon had changed the order of succession so that Ingeborg's future children and possibly his husband would succeed him. In 1308, Haakon joined the front against the dukes, and the betrothal between Erik and Ingeborg was broken.

Ingeborg was now promised to Magnus instead. According to Sverre Bagge, King Haakon might have wanted Magnus as his successor, since his future seemed promising: he was already the heir to the throne of Sweden, and it was also possible that he might inherit the Danish throne, since King Erik Menved had no son. Magnus could thus become the king of all three Scandinavian kingdoms. In the summer of 1309, Magnus, his father and his uncle granted the power of attorney to three Danes, a bishop, a provost, and a knight, to arrange the marriage between Ingeborg and Magnus. The formal betrothal took place at the St. Mary's Church in Oslo, with Bishop Peder of Viborg standing in for Magnus in the ceremony. The marriage agreement was confirmed in the treaty of Hälsingborg between the Scandinavian kings and the dukes in 1310.

This marriage agreement was broken after King Haakon reconciled with the dukes, and in the autumn of 1312, Ingeborg was married with Duke Erik. A marriage between Magnus and Prince Vitslav III of Rügen's daughter, Eufemia, was arranged in 1313. However, she does not appear in records after this, suggesting that she may have died, and that the marriage did not take place.

== Banquet at Nyköping and its aftermath ==
In 1317, King Birger decided to get his revenge against the dukes and to regain the full control over Sweden, which had been divided between the three brothers in 1310. He invited Valdemar and Erik to celebrate Christmas with him and Queen Märta at Nyköping Castle. This event, known as Nyköping Banquet, is described dramatically in Erikskrönikan. After a day of celebration, King Birger imprisoned the dukes to the castle dungeon, where they later died in 1318. During the Banquet, Magnus was away in Denmark.

The dukes' deaths caused an uproar and King Birger was faced with a rebellion which he tried to control with Erik Menved's support. According to Erikskrönikan, Magnus arrived from Denmark in early 1318 with 600 Danish cavalrymen which joined Birger's forces in Östergötland. Birger and Märta fled to Gotland, while Magnus was left behind to command Stegeborg Castle, which was sieged by the dukes' supporters. When Stegeborg was forced to capitulate, Magnus was handed to his father's enemies and was imprisoned in Stockholm. In the truce of Roskilde in Autumn 1318, it was agreed that he would not be harmed physically. Erikskrönikan emphasizes that he was treated well in captivity and did not starve, in contrast to King Birger's treatment of the dukes.

In 1319, Birger was deposed and Duke Erik's three-year old son Magnus Eriksson was elected King of Sweden. He also inherited the Norwegian throne after King Haakon's death the same year. Magnus Birgersson was now seen as a potential rival to the throne of Sweden and a threat to Magnus Eriksson's legitimacy. As a result, he was executed by beheading on Helgeandsholmen in Stockholm in 1320. Erikskrönikan, which is biased against Birger, holds Magnus Birgersson innocent to his father's misdeeds and treats him with sympathy, emphasizing that his body was treated with respect after the execution. He was buried in the tomb of his grandfather, King Magnus Ladulås, in Riddarholmen Church.
