= Håtuna game =

1306 conflict between King Birger of Sweden and his brothers

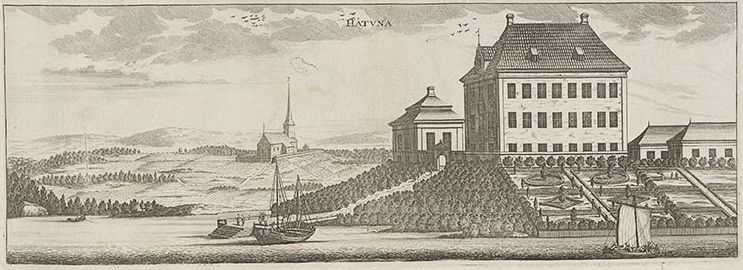
Håtuna

The Håtuna game (Swedish: Håtunaleken) was a conflict in 1306 between Birger, King of Sweden (1280–1321) and his brothers, the dukes Eric Magnusson (c. 1281–1318) and Valdemar Magnusson (c. 1282–1318).

== Background ==
When Magnus Ladulås died in 1290, his eldest son Birger Magnusson was only 10 years old. Birger had been designated heir during his father’s reign, and when Magnus Ladulås died in 1290, both he and the kingdom came under the guardianship of the marshal, Torgils Knutsson. In 1304 his brothers signed a document that forbade them from conducting their own foreign policy and kept them out of the royal court unless they had specifically been summoned. The bitterness over this agreement was probably the cause of the Håtuna games.

When marshal Torgils Knutsson returned from the third and last crusade in Finland in 1293, a feud had developed between the brothers, with Torgils supporting King Birger. Duke Eric, as a leader of men and politician possibly better king material than Birger, tried to establish an independent kingdom around Bohuslän, which he had received as part of his marriage to the princess Ingeborg of Norway, and Halland at the boundary between Sweden, Norway, and Denmark. A civil war broke out, but by 1306 emotions had cooled to the point where the dukes acknowledged the son of Birger, Magnus Birgersson, as the successor to the throne. The marshal, Torgils Knutsson, was captured in 1305 by the dukes and was executed in 1306 in Stockholm by decapitation.

== Events at Håtuna ==
On 29 September 1306, Duke Eric and Duke Valdemar arrived at King Birger's estate in Håtuna Parish by Lake Mälaren. They came from a wedding feast in Bjälbo, and Birger received them as guests at a celebration that derailed during the night. Birger and his wife, Martha of Denmark, were seized by the dukes and imprisoned in the dungeon of Nyköping Castle for two years. King Birger's son, Magnus Birgersson, was rescued by a courtier and sent to Denmark, where he was received by King Eric VI.

== Aftermath ==
Duke Eric took over power in Sweden. He was already sovereign in Halland and Bohuslän, and through his marriage to Princess Ingeborg he harboured ambitions that connected him to the Norwegian succession. But his alignment with Denmark soon became a threat, and King Eric VI of Denmark attacked Sweden, harassing Västergötland. Duke Eric's brother Valdemar retaliated by plundering Skåne with a force of German mercenaries. The Norwegian king allied himself with the Danish king, forcing a settlement that allowed Birger to leave Nyköping Castle after two years of imprisonment.

For ten years the brothers maintained a tense peace, with only minor skirmishes. In 1317–1318 the conflict reached its final phase during the Nyköping Banquet and the events that followed.
