= Helvig of Holstein =

Queen of Sweden from 1276 to 1290

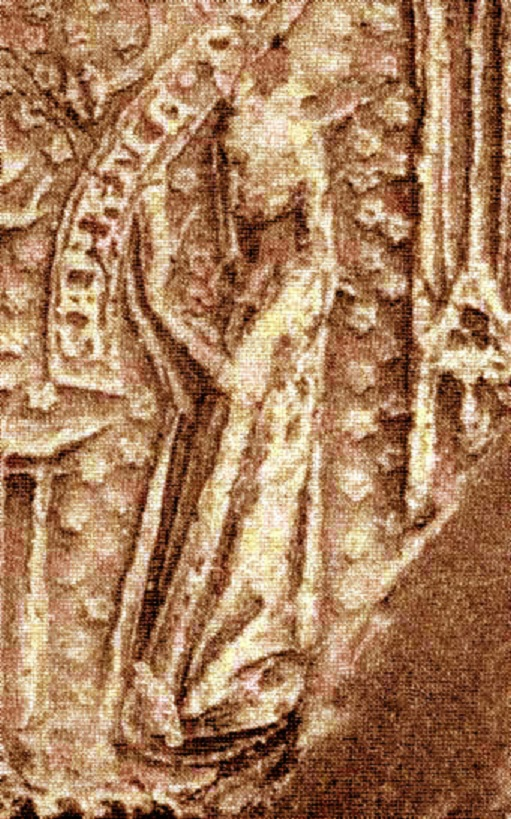
- Seal of Queen Helvig

Queen consort of Sweden
- Tenure: 1276–1290
- Coronation: 29 June 1281
- Born: c. 1259
- Died: c. 1325 (age c. 65–66)
- Burial: Riddarholm Church
- Spouse: Magnus Ladulås
- Issue: Ingeborg, Queen of Denmark; Birger, King of Sweden; Eric, Duke of Södermanland; Valdemar, Duke of Finland; Rikissa Magnusdotter
- House: Schauenburg
- Father: Gerhard I, Count of Holstein-Itzehoe
- Mother: Elisabeth of Mecklenburg

Helvig of Holstein (also known as Hedwig; c. 1259 – c. 1325) was Queen of Sweden as the consort of King Magnus Ladulås. Her parents were Gerhard I, Count of Holstein-Itzehoe (died 1290) and Elisabeth of Mecklenburg (died 1280).

== Biography ==
Helvig's years of birth and death are only approximately known, but she is believed to have been born in early 1260s. Unlike many other medieval brides, she was almost adult when she married King Magnus III in 1276. By marrying Helvig, Magnus prevented his brother Valdemar from obtaining help from Holstein against him. Her father Gerhard I received from an annual salary of 600 marks from Magnus.

Many previous ties existed between Magnus' and Helvig's families, as his father Birger Jarl had married Helvig's aunt Matilda of Holstein in 1261, and Magnus' niece Ingeborg had married Helvig's brother Gerhard II in 1275.

Her father was captured during the Folkunge party revolt (Folkungaupproret) by rebellious noblemen in Skara in 1278 and the queen was also targeted. The actions of the rebels were well timed; they coincided with her journey through Sweden. She sought refuge in the convent in the city.

Helvig was crowned Queen of Sweden in the city of Söderköping on 29 June 1281; this is the first confirmed coronation of a queen consort in Sweden. She founded the Franciscan convent (Gråmunkekloster) in Stockholm and several other churches and convents. As a queen, however, she is not very much heard of, despite the fact that she held the position for fourteen years, she lived a discreet life, both as a queen and as a dowager queen. She took a prominent part in processions which accompanied the inauguration of bishops, celebrations of a feast day and the installation of relics, such as the Mass for Saint Erik in 1277.

After the death of her spouse in 1290, Helvig acted as one of the executors of the will of the King, and withdrew to her estate Dåvö in Västmanland, which had been given to her as dower. She is not known to have taken any political role, formal or informal, during or after the reign of her spouse. She was described as a noble, loyal and peace-loving mother figure, tormented by the conflicts between her sons. She acted as a foster mother for her son's future bride, Martha of Denmark, who spent a lot of her childhood in Sweden as the future Queen of Sweden after 1290. In 1302, she was present at the coronation of her son.

The death of Queen Helvig was not recorded in the annals. She was still alive in early 1324 but dead by early 1326.

== Modern research ==
The tomb of Magnus Ladulås in Riddarholmen Church was investigated between 1914 and 1920. During this investigation, two female skeletons were found and were initially identified as Queen Helvig and her daughter Rikissa. However, modern analyses have since revealed discrepancies in these identifications. Radiocarbon dating of the remains conducted in 2011 determined that the skeletons dated from the 15th and early 16th centuries, and are likely not related to Magnus Ladulås or his immediate family. The burial sites of Queen Helvig and Rikissa remain unknown.

== Name ==
Her name is found in few contemporary sources. In Erikskrönikan, which was probably written in 1320s, her name is spelled helewigh (in Old Swedish). The name variant with a middle vowel may have been chosen for poetic reasons. In the documents that have survived, her name is consistently written in Latin as Heluighis. In German, her name is usually given as Heilwig, which was also the name of her grandmother Heilwig of Lippe.

In some modern texts, her name is spelled Hedwig or Hedvig. This has been attributed to the influence of a namesake (in German), the daughter of Gerhard VI and the mother of Christian I, who came to be known in Swedish as Hedvig of Holstein (Danish: Hedevig).

== Issue ==
On 11 November 1276, at Kalmar Castle, Helvig married Magnus Ladulås of Sweden. They had at least three sons and two daughters:

- Ingeborg (1277 – 1319); married King Eric VI of Denmark.
- Birger (1280 – 1321), King of Sweden from 1290 to 1318
- Eric (c. 1282 – 1318), Duke, father to King Magnus Eriksson; the Eric's Chronicle is named after him
- Valdemar (after 1282 – 1318), Duke of Finland. Eric and Valdemar died of starvation 1318 at Nyköpingshus Castle while imprisoned by his brother, King Birger.
- Rikissa (c. 1285 – 1348), Abbess of the convent of St. Clare's Priory, Stockholm.

== Notes ==
Helvig of Holstein Born: 1260 Died: 1324
Swedish royalty
Preceded by Sofia of Denmark	Queen consort of Sweden; 1276–1290	Vacant Title next held by Martha of Denmark
