= Magnus Birgersson (disambiguation) =

Magnus Birgersson (c. 1240 – 1290), also known as Magnus Ladulås, was King of Sweden from 1275 until his death.

Magnus Birgersson may also refer to:

- Magnus Birgersson (1300–1320), the eldest son of King Birger of Sweden
- Magnus Birgersson, Swedish electronic music artist with the stage name Solar Fields
