= Birger of Sweden =

Birger of Sweden may refer to:

- Birger, King of Sweden also called Birger Magnusson (c. 1280–1321), King of Sweden 1290–1318
- Birger Jarl also called Birger Magnusson (c. 1200–1266), Jarl of Sweden and statesman
