= Ida Östenberg =

Roman historian

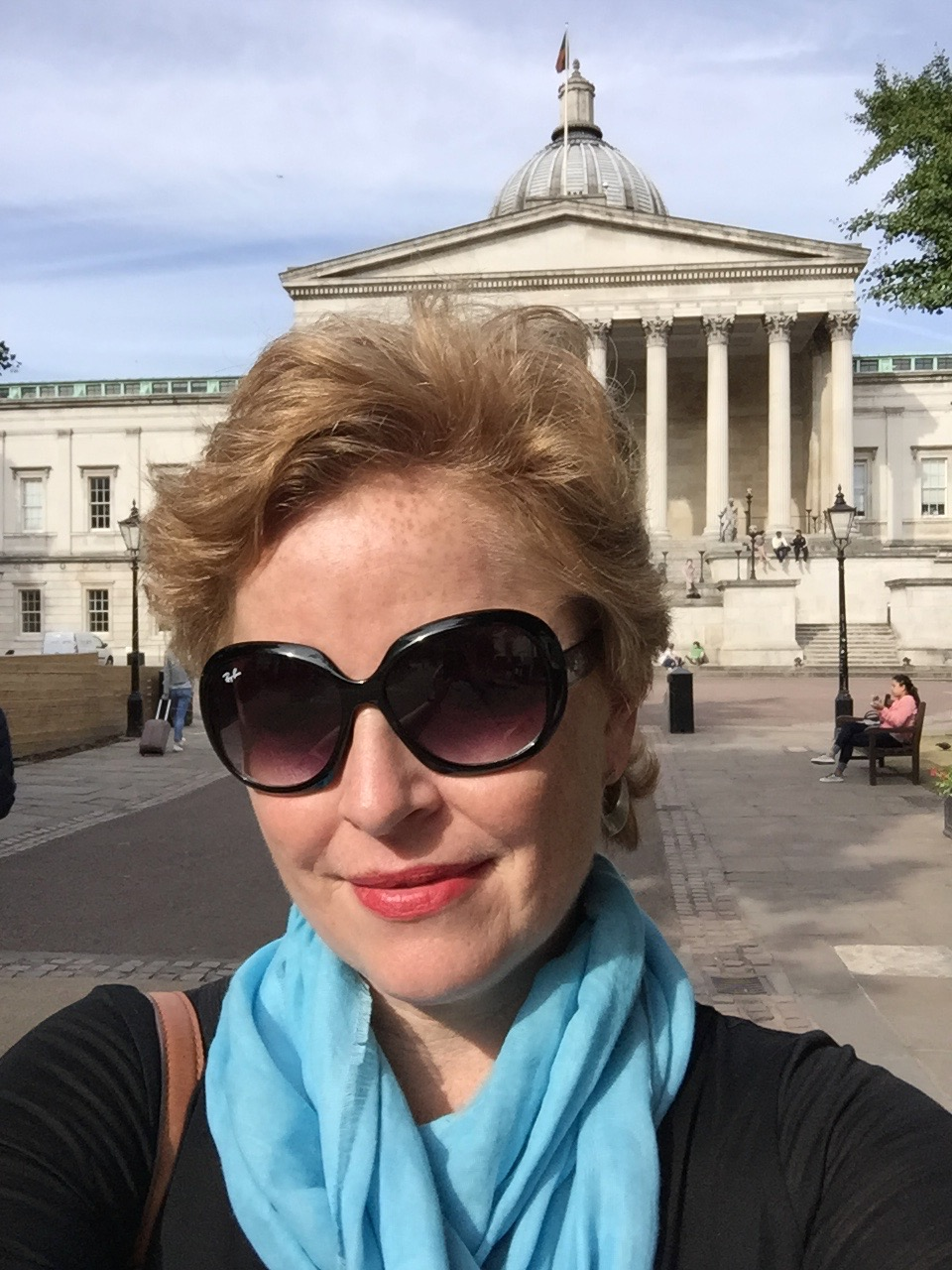
- Ida Östenberg at University College London in 2017
- Born: 1965 (age 60–61)

Academic background
- Education: Lund University
- Thesis: Staging the world. Rome and the other in the triumphal procession

Academic work
- Discipline: Ancient History
- Sub-discipline: Roman history
- Institutions: University of Gothenburg
- Notable works: Staging the world. Spoils, captives, and representations in the Roman triumphal procession

Ida Östenberg (born 1965) is a Roman historian, working in the areas of Roman political culture, Roman rituals, performances and spectacles, and Classical reception. She is known in particular for her work on the Roman triumph, and is an expert selected by the Swedish Research Council for inclusion in AcademiaNet. She is the 2018 winner of the Stora historiepriset, Sweden's largest history prize.

== Career ==
Östenberg completed her PhD in 2001 at Lund University, and her habilitation in 2010. Since 2015 she has been a Research fellow at the Royal Swedish Academy of Letters, History and Antiquities. She is a Full Professor in the field of Classical Archaeology and Ancient History at the Department of Historical Studies at the University of Gothenburg.

Östenberg has published numerous articles and a monograph entitled Staging the world (2009), focusing on the Roman triumph, which was described as a "welcome expansion of our factual knowledge of the triumph".

Östenberg is included in AcademiaNet, the Expert Database for Outstanding Female Academics, following nomination by the Swedish Research Council for meeting the project's criteria of outstanding academic qualifications and independent leadership activities.

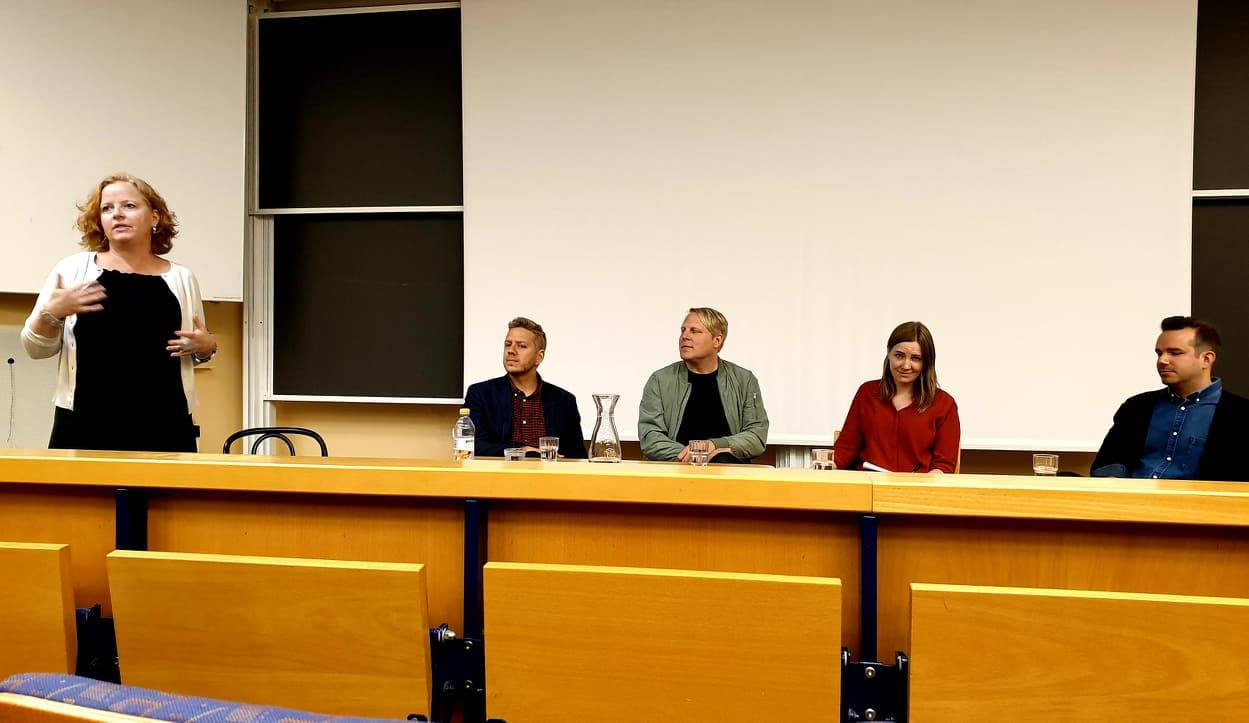
Ida Östenberg introducing a seminar on public outreach held at The University of Gothenburg in May 2019

Östenberg is a frequent contributor to Svenska Dagbladet, writing principally on how ancient literature and culture can influence the modern world, including what can be learnt from experiences of the past, and other publications, bringing historical perspectives to modern discourse. In 2018, Östenberg received the Stora historiepriset (Great History Prize) for using historical perspectives in modern social and political debates through her academic and journalism work. The prize is Sweden's largest history prize and was awarded to Östenberg at an event at Sörmlands Museum.

Östenberg delivered a plenary lecture on "Dulce et decorum. Dying for the fatherland (or not) in ancient Rome" at the FIEC / CA 2019 conference on 8 July 2019.

== Honours and awards ==
- Prize from Inga and John Hain's foundation, 2004
- Johan Lundblad Award from the Swedish Academy, 2016
- Humtank, prize 2017
- Stora historiepriset (Great History Prize), 2018

== Selected publications ==
- Östenberg, I. Staging the world. Spoils, captives, and representations in the Roman triumphal procession. Oxford University Press 2009.
- Östenberg, I. 'Veni vidi vici and Caesar's triumph' in Classical Quarterly 63 (2):p. 813-827 (2013).
- Östenberg, I., S. Malmberg and J. Bjørnebye (eds). The Moving City: Processions, passages and promenades in ancient Rome. Bloomsbury, London 2015.
- Östenberg, I. 'Damnatio Memoriae Inscribed: The Materiality of Cultural Repression' in (eds.) Andrej Petrovic, Ivana Petrovic and Edmund Thomas The Materiality of Text – Placement, Perception, and Presence of Inscribed Texts in Classical Antiquity Brill Studies in Greek and Roman Epigraphy 11 2018, p. 324-47.
