= Magnus of Sweden =

Magnus of Sweden may refer to:

- Magnus the Strong (c. 1106 – 1134), King in Götaland from 1120s to c. 1132
- Magnus Henriksson (c. 1130 – 1161), King of Sweden from 1160 to 1161
- Magnus Ladulås (c. 1240 – 1290), King of Sweden from 1275 to 1290
- Magnus Eriksson (1316–1374), King of Sweden (1319–1364) and Norway (1319–1355)
- Magnus Birgersson (1300–1320), eldest son of King Birger Magnusson of Sweden
- Magnus, Duke of Östergötland (1542–1595), third son of King Gustav Vasa of Sweden
