= Hedwig of Sweden =

Hedwig or Hedvig of Sweden may refer to:

- Helvig of Holstein, Queen consort of Sweden 1276, sometimes called Hedwig
- Hedvig Eleonora of Holstein-Gottorp, Queen consort of Sweden 1654
- Hedvig Elisabeth Charlotte of Holstein-Gottorp, Queen consort of Sweden 1809, officially named Charlotte
- Hedwig Sophia, Princess of Sweden 1681
