= Mats Kettilmundsson =

Swedish regent (c. 1280–1326)

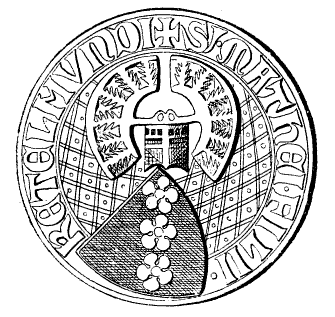
Seal of Mats Kettilmundsson, Nordisk familjebok (1913)

Mats Kettilmundsson (also Mattias) (ca. 1280 - died 11 May 1326) was a Swedish knight, riksdrots and statesman.

== Biography ==
In 1302, Mats Kettilmundsson was one of the knights and confidants of Duke Eric Magnusson (c. 1282–1318). He joined the Swedish regency council under Duchess Ingeborg (1301–1361) together with her sister-in-law Ingeborg, Duchess of Öland (1297-1357), a regency for the minor King Magnus Eriksson (1316-1374). During 1319, Mats Kettilmundsson resigned but continued to occupy a significant place among the council and as the king's guardian.

In 1322 he participated in the meeting of nobles at Skara.

During his later years, he was a courtier in Finland. As commander of the military in Swedish Finland, but against the wishes of the Swedish government, in 1325 he crossed the Gulf of Finland and attacked Tallinn (then a Danish possession), alleging that the city must be punished for executing four of his soldiers who had gone on a rampage there. He died in May 1326, probably at Turku.
