= Älvsala =

- Location within Stockholm Location within Sweden Location within European Union
- Coordinates: 59°18′14″N 18°38′6″E
- Country: Sweden
- Province: Uppland
- County: Stockholm County
- Municipality: Värmdö Municipality

Area
  - Total: 0.335 km^{2} (0.129 sq mi)

Population (31 December 2020)
  - Total: 381
  - Density: 1,140/km^{2} (2,950/sq mi)
- Time zone: UTC+1 (CET)
  - Summer (DST): UTC+2 (CEST)

Älvsala is a locality situated in Breviken, in the southeastern part of Värmdö Municipality, Stockholm County, Sweden.

== History ==
The Värmdö maritime district was for a long time divided into quarters. In 1538, there was an Ulffzala quarter which consisted of the current Östra and Västra Älvsala as well as several farms situated westward. In 1580 these farms were merged into the Hemmesta quarter.

In 1719, Älvsala was burned down by the Imperial Russian Fleet, becoming one of many settlements in the Stockholm archipelago that got attacked in the Russian pillage of 1719–1721 as part of the Great Northern War.

Alongside Statistics Sweden's changing of its method for determining agglomerations in 2015, four small areas of Älvsala, Fagerdala, Bullandö and Björkvik were merged, forming a new locality. In 2020, the Fagerdala area was mined out and renamed to Västra Älvsala.

== Society ==
Today, the area is partly covered by holiday home developments. Värmdö municipality officials predict that the number of permanent residents is eventually going to increase.
