= Slangerup Abbey =

Former monastery in Denmark

Coordinates: 55.8447°N 12.1692°E

Slangerup Abbey (Slangerup Kloster) was a nunnery first of Benedictine nuns, then of Cistercian nuns. It was in operation between 1170 and 1555 and was located in Slangerup, Denmark. It has left no visible remains.

== History ==
Slangerup was a royal residence dating from perhaps as early as 1000. It was part residence, part farm, and enclosed so it could serve as a small fort. About 1095 King Erik Ejegod, who was born here, replaced the wooden stave church with a limestone church dedicated to Saint Nicholas. Its final dimensions were 60 meters long and 13 meters wide. The church was later enlarged to comprise a nave with two side aisles and an apse added onto the choir. It also had twin towers about 30 meters in height.

In 1170 King Valdemar den Store gave the farm and church of Slangerup to a community of Benedictine nuns, to establish an abbey. It was dedicated to Our Lady and Saint Nicholas at the suggestion of Absalon, Bishop of Roskilde. Valdemar moved his unmarried daughters to the abbey where they could be watched over and educated. The church became one wing of the cloister, in which the nuns were separated from the world. They had their own private entry to the choir of the church which was gated off from the rest of the congregation, who usually attended the church only on holy days.

In 1187 a letter was written to Bishop Absalon, complaining that not all the nuns were "virtuous". This complaint led to the replacement of the Benedictine nuns with the new and strict Cistercian Order, which was seen as a reform. The original nuns either left or conformed to the new observance. Throughout the 13th-14th centuries, the abbey received many rental properties and gifts of money from noble families for services rendered by the nuns for recently departed family members or for burial inside the Church. They also received donations and allowances from families who sent unmarried women to live a quasi-religious life in the abbey until they married or took the vows of chastity, poverty, and obedience. By 1344, Princess Agnes Birgersdotter, the daughter of King Birger Magnusson and Queen Märta of Denmark, and her retinue were sent to live at Slangerup by King Erik VII. To ensure the abbey's continued existence it was given the town of Slangerup and several other large properties.

=== Dissolution ===
The Protestant Reformation in Denmark brought an end to the abbey at Slangerup. In 1529 the estate was given to Martin Bussert, who lost it during the Count's Feud. All religious houses were closed and became Crown property in 1536 when Denmark accepted the Smalcald Articles and officially became a Lutheran realm. Monasteries including Slangerup Abbey were secularized, with the nuns allowed to live in the former monasteries under the supervision of a secular prioress. Nobles were given the use and income of the estate with the condition that they assume responsibility for the remaining nuns. At Slangerup this arrangement lasted until 1555 when Arild Ubbe was given the estate by King Christian III. In 1559 the valuable estate and its rent properties were broken up and divided between Copenhagen Castle, the University of Copenhagen, and the town of Slangerup.

St. Nicholas' church was adjudged superfluous and demolished in 1572; the materials were used to construct St. Michael's Church (Slangerup kirke Skt. Mikaels) in Slangerup. Part of the altarpiece at St. Michael's includes the wooden altarpiece from Slangerup Abbey Church. By 1600 the entire monastic complex was completely demolished. The building materials were sold to Frederik II to be used in the construction of Frederiksborg Castle at Hillerød.

== Other Sources ==
- Slangerup Parish website: history of the abbey and church (in Danish)
