= Västra Älvsala =

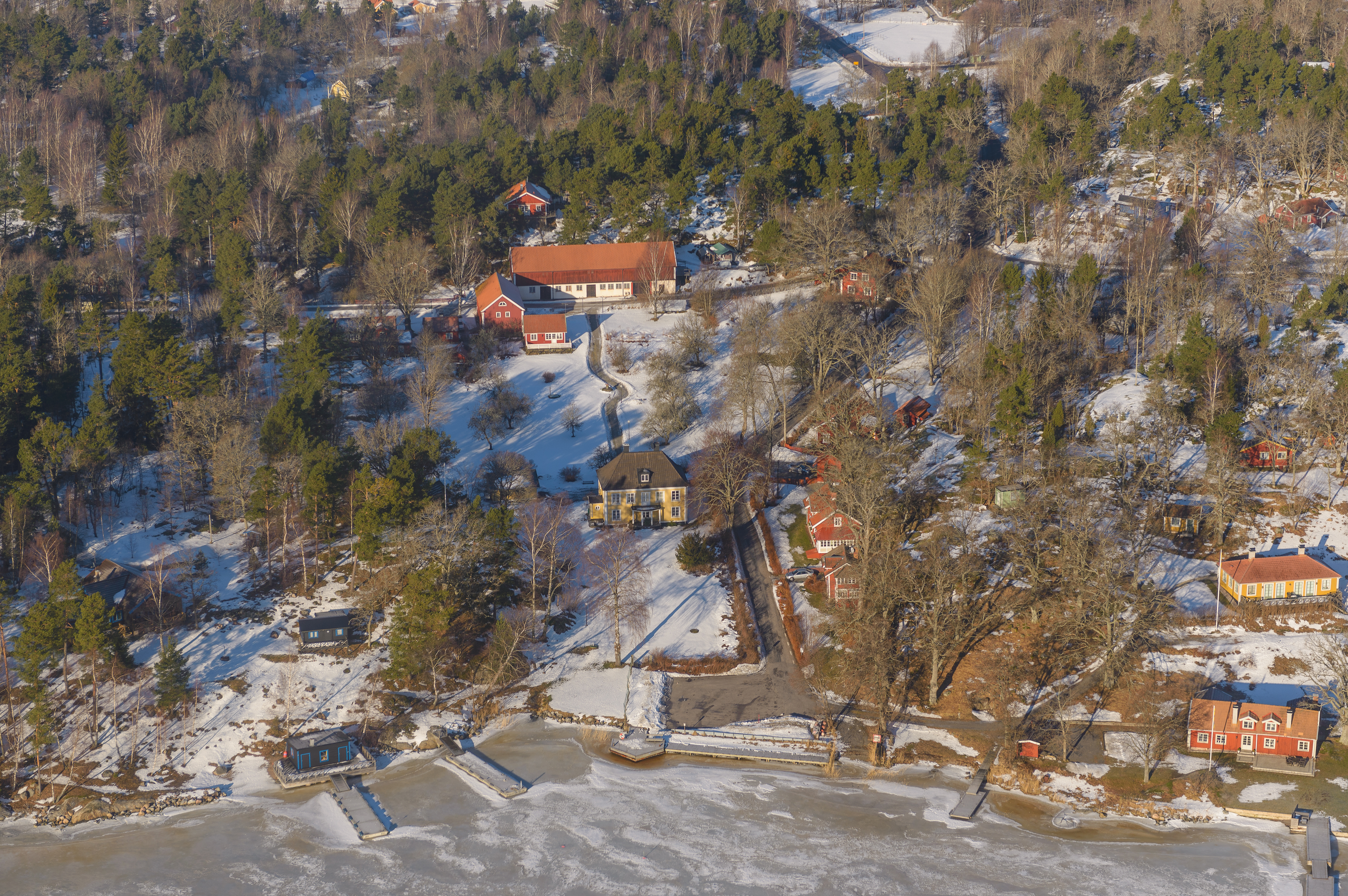

- Location within Stockholm Location within Sweden Location within European Union
- Coordinates: 59°17′32″N 18°37′9″E
- Country: Sweden
- Province: Uppland
- County: Stockholm County
- Municipality: Värmdö Municipality

Area
  - Total: 0.132 km^{2} (0.051 sq mi)

Population (2020)
  - Total: 203
- Time zone: UTC+1 (CET)
  - Summer (DST): UTC+2 (CEST)

Västra Älvsala is a locality situated in Värmdö Municipality, Stockholm County, Sweden.

Statistics Sweden demarcated the settlement into a small town between 1995 and 2015 called Fagerdala. In the delimitation of urban areas in 2015, Fagerdala was included in the new urban area of Älvsala. At the clearing in 2020, the settlement was separated from Älvsala and reclassified as a separate locality named Västra Älvsdala.

== History ==
Fagerdala was included in Ulffzala quarter in 1538. The farm was granted in 1638 to Axel Oxenstierna. Hemmanet was burned in 1719 by the Imperial Russian Fleet. During the latter part of the 18th century, the farm was owned by the Psilanderhjelm family in nearby Brevik.

== Society ==
Near the jetty there are some older wooden houses. Some buildings are used as holiday homes, but with an increasing proportion of permanent residences.

== Nature ==
West of Västra Älvsala is the Morträsket wetland with bird and plant life worthy of protection.
