= Sörmland Museum =

Cultural museum in Sweden

Coordinates: 58.75004°N 17.01155°E

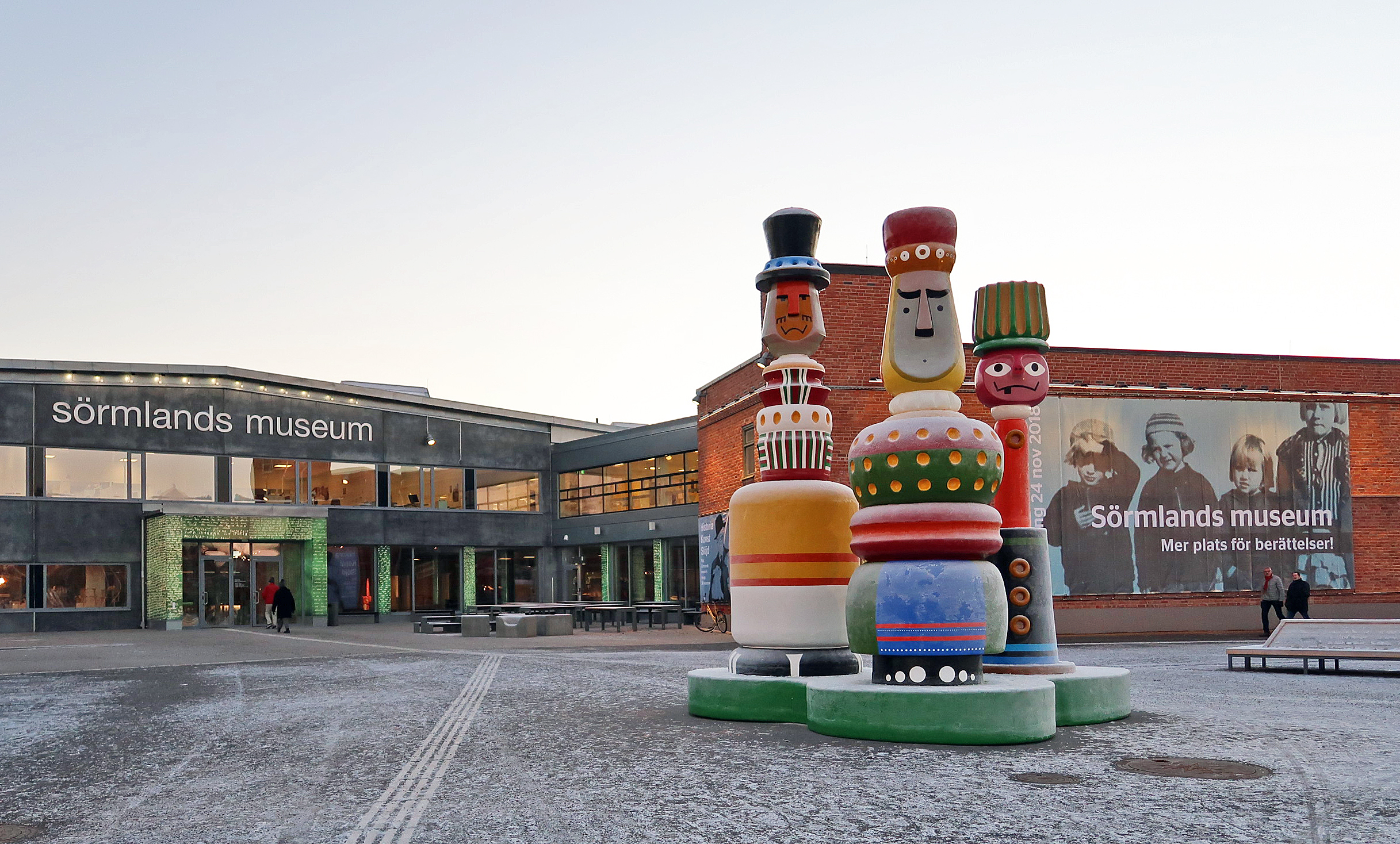
Sörmland Museum entrance

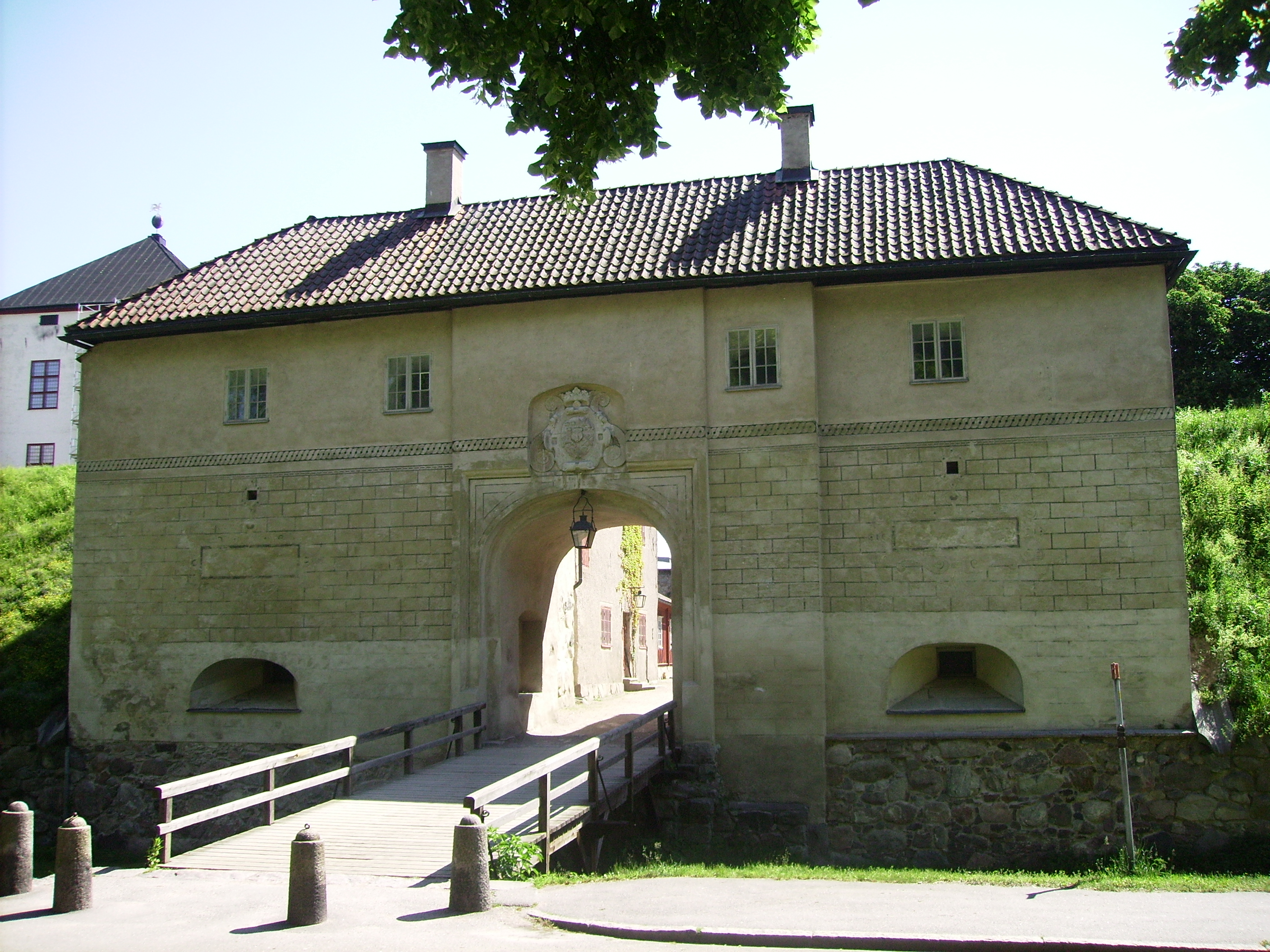
Nyköping Castle housing part of the museum exhibits

Sörmland Museum (Sörmlands museum) is the cultural-historical museum of Södermanland County, Sweden. The institution is responsible for preservation and conducting research in the area of the cultural history and archaeology of the county, including the medieval city of Nyköping.

The museum was first located in Nyköping Castle (Nyköpingshus)) on the river in central Nyköping. In 2018, new premises were inaugurated for the Sörmlands Museum in Nyköping. The new facility contains collections with more than 70,000 objects together with libraries, concert halls, lecture halls and workshops.
