= Ingeborg, Duchess of Öland =

Ingeborg
- Duchess of Finland
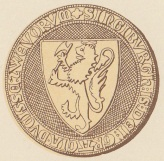
- Seal of Ingeborg.
- Born: 1297
- Died: 1357 (aged 59–60)
- Spouse: Valdemar, Duke of Finland
- House: Sverre
- Father: Eric II of Norway
- Mother: Isabel Bruce

Ingeborg, Duchess of Öland (Norwegian: Ingebjørg Eiriksdatter; 1297–1357) was a Norwegian princess and a Swedish duchess. She was Duchess of Uppland, Öland and Finland. As a widow, she had a seat in the regency government of her nephew Magnus, who reigned as king of both Sweden and Norway.

== Family ==
Ingeborg was the daughter of King Eric II of Norway and Isabel Bruce. Her father, Eric II, died on 15 July 1299, when Ingeborg was one or two years old. He was succeeded by his younger brother, Haakon V, as he died without sons. In 1300, Ingeborg's mother arranged her three-year-old daughter's engagement to Jon Magnusson, Earl of Orkney (died 1311). The marriage never took place; it is unclear whether the engagement was called off or if he died before her coming of age.

== Marriage ==
In a 1312 double wedding in Oslo (another match arranged by her mother), Ingeborg married the Swedish king Birger's youngest brother, Valdemar, Duke of Finland, while her younger cousin Ingeborg, the only legitimate child of King Haakon V, married Birger's eldest brother Duke Eric. The elder Ingeborg's dower included the island of Öland, whereby she was occasionally mentioned as Duchess of Öland. In 1316, she had a son who probably died young.

On the night between the tenth and eleventh of December 1317, her husband Valdemar and his brother Eric were arrested and chained during a call on their elder brother King Birger in Nyköping. At the imprisonment of her husband and brother-in-law, she and her cousin and sister-in-law, Ingeborg Håkansdotter, became the leaders of their spouses' followers. On 16 April 1318, "the two duchesses Ingeborg" made a treaty in Kalmar with the Danish duke Christoffer of Halland-Samsö and archbishop Esgar of Lund to free their husbands and not to make peace with the kings of Sweden and Denmark before they agreed to this, and the two duchesses promised to honour the promises they gave in return in the names of their husbands. Later the same year, their husbands were confirmed to have died. They either starved to death or were murdered.

== Widowhood ==
The "two duchesses Ingeborg" are thus mentioned once in 1318 as acting for the government alongside Mats Kettilmundsson. It appears then as if Ingeborg had a seat at that time in the guardian government of her cousin Ingeborg's underage son, King Magnus, though there is no list of those seat members and no other evidence that she actually was on it. Her sister-in-law did remain a powerful politician for decades. Ingeborg Eriksdotter was styled Duchess of Öland from at least 1340, surviving her late husband long after his death and staying in Sweden until her own death.
