= Erik's Chronicle =

Swedish chronicle

Erik's Chronicle (Note: Also translated as Eric's Chronicle, The Chronicle of Erik or Erik Chronicle) (Swedish: Erikskrönikan) is the oldest surviving Swedish chronicle. It was written by an unknown author (or, less probably, several authors) between about 1320 and 1335.

It is the oldest in a group of medieval rhymed chronicles recounting political events in Sweden. It is one of Sweden's earliest and most important narrative sources. Its authorship and precise political significance and biases are debated, but it is clear that the chronicle's protagonist and hero is Duke Erik Magnusson, brother of King Birger of Sweden.

The chronicle is written in knittelvers, a form of doggerel, and in its oldest version is 4543 lines long. It begins in 1229, with the reign of King Erik Eriksson (d. 1250) but focuses on the period 1250–1319, ending when the three-year-old Magnus Eriksson was elected to the throne of Sweden and inherited the throne of Norway.

The chronicle was composed after 1320, based on its description of the most recent event, the execution of the young Magnus Birgersson. Since it does not mention Magnus Eriksson's rule over Skåne, it is often assumed to have been written before 1332. At the latest, it was completed by 1335, prior to Magnus Eriksson's coming of age and ascension as king.

The chronicle survives in six manuscripts from the 15th, and a further fourteen from the 16th and 17th centuries.

== Example ==
Dödhin han er ekke söther
thz rönte herra jwan
en höwelik riddare ok wäl dan
han war ther skutin i häll
thz edde hertoganom ekke wäl
En riddare heyt gudzsär
han fik ther ok slikt sama wärk
han hörde konung birge till
mannen dör tho han ey will
Ther miste han sith liiff
fult gaff han fore thera kiiff

Death is not mild:
Sir Ivan experienced it,
a courteous, excellent knight:
an arrow transfixed him and he died.
The duke was not happy for that.
A knight's name was Gudsärk,
the same thing happened to him,
he was one of King Birger's men.
Men die even if they don't want:
he lost his life,
he paid for their conflict. (Note: Lines 3269-79, quoted and translated by Fulvio Ferrari, here with minor amendments to punctuation.)
