= Birger, King of Sweden =

King of Sweden from 1290 to 1318

Birger Magnusson
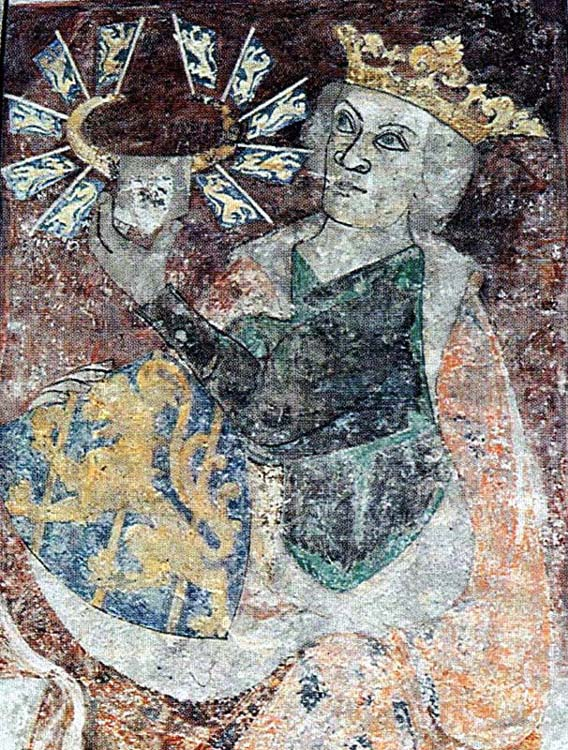
- Memorial portrait of Birger at St. Bendt's Church, Ringsted, Denmark

King of Sweden
- Reign: 18 December 1290 – March/April 1318
- Coronation: 2 December 1302, Söderköping
- Predecessor: Magnus Ladulås
- Successor: Magnus Eriksson
- Born: c. 1280; Sweden (possibly Stockholm)
- Died: after 31 May 1321; Denmark
- Burial: St. Bendt's Church, Ringsted, Zealand
- Spouse: Märta Eriksdotter of Denmark (m. 1298)
- Issue: Magnus Birgersson
- House: Bjälbo
- Father: Magnus Ladulås
- Mother: Helvig of Holstein

Birger Magnusson (c. 1280 – after 31 May 1321) was King of Sweden from 1290 until his deposition in 1318. He was the son of King Magnus Ladulås and Helvig of Holstein, and was crowned during his father's lifetime. He married Märta Eriksdotter, daughter of King Eric V Klipping of Denmark.

Birger's reign was dominated by conflict with his younger brothers, Dukes Erik and Valdemar Magnusson, who sought greater influence within the kingdom. In 1306, the dukes seized and imprisoned Birger during the Håtuna games, although he later regained his freedom and royal authority. In 1317, Birger retaliated by capturing his brothers at the Nyköping Banquet, after which they died in captivity. Their deaths provoked a widespread rebellion, and Birger was deposed and forced to flee to Denmark in 1318. He remained there in exile until his death. His eldest son, Magnus, was captured by his father's opponents and executed in 1320.

== Background ==
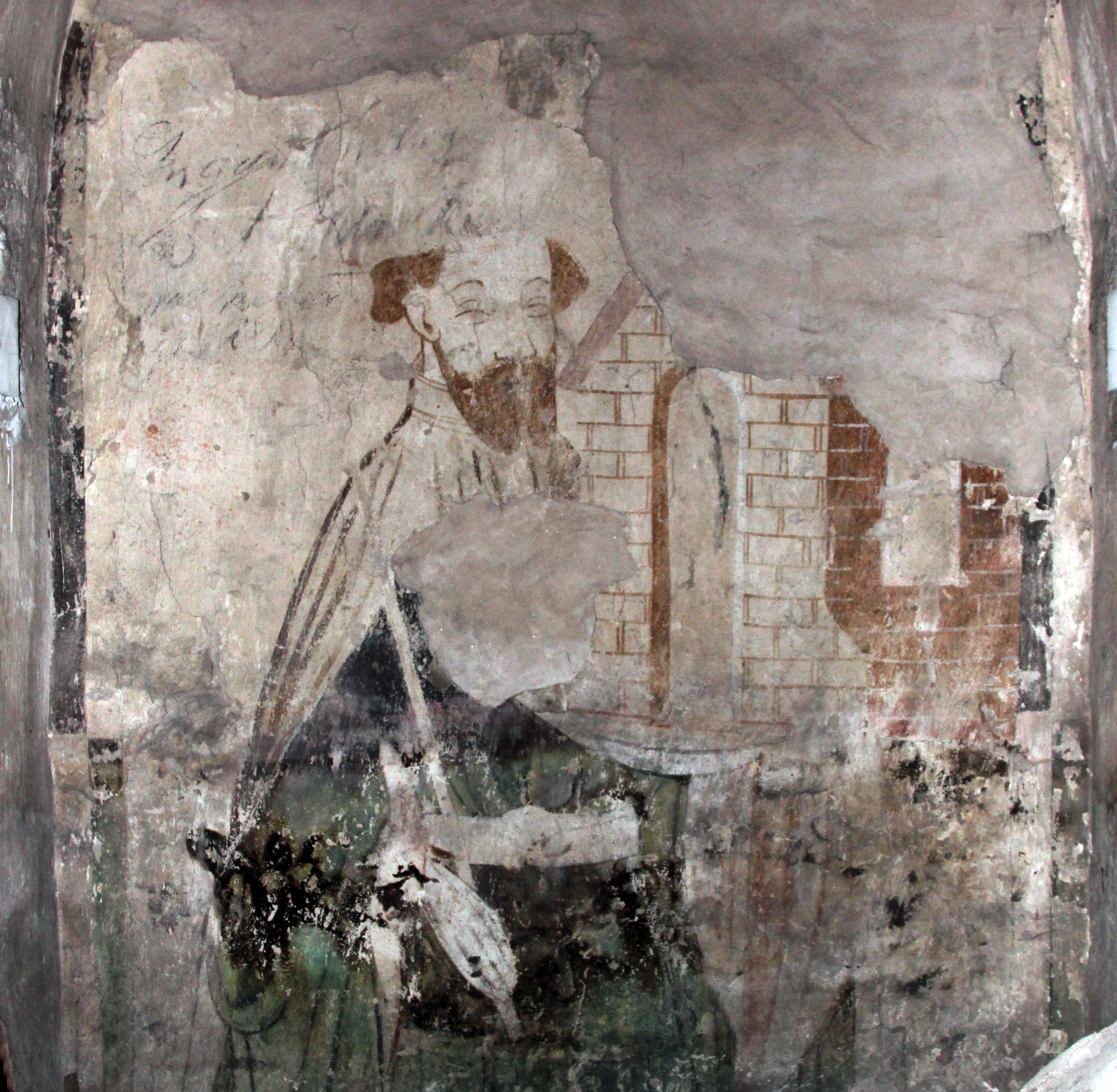
Birger's father, Magnus Ladulås

Birger Magnusson was the son of King Magnus Ladulås and Helvig of Holstein. In order to secure the succession, King Magnus had Birger hailed as king of Sweden when he was four years old. In 1275, Magnus had led a rebellion against his elder brother, King Valdemar, and ousted him from the throne. Before his death, Magnus ordered his kinsman, Torkel Knutsson, the Constable of the Realm, to be Birger's guardian. In 1302, Birger was crowned at Söderköping after marrying Martha of Denmark, the daughter of King Eric V of Denmark.

== Reign ==
Birger was only ten years old when his father died, at which time Torkel Knutsson was the most influential statesman in Sweden. In 1293, Torkel Knutsson led the Swedes to a victory which won a part of western Karelia. This expedition has traditionally been dubbed as the Third Swedish Crusade. When Torkel Knutsson returned from leading the crusade in Finland, a feud had developed between the brothers. Torkel Knutsson supported King Birger.

Birger came of age when there was a conflict within the Church of Sweden over interpretation of the Privileges of 1280, which had been the cost of the support of the Church for his father's usurpation. The king's brothers, dukes Erik and Valdemar, took advantage of this conflict. Duke Erik tried to establish an independent kingdom around Bohuslän, which he had received as part of his marriage to the Norwegian princess Ingeborg, and Halland at the boundary between Sweden, Norway and Denmark. A civil war broke out, but by 1306 emotions had cooled to the point where the dukes acknowledged Birger's son, Magnus, as the successor to the throne. Torkel Knutsson, who was Duke Valdemar's father-in-law, was executed in 1306 as a token of reconciliation between King Birger and his brothers. The same year, in an event known as the Håtuna games (Håtunaleken), Birger was taken captive by his brothers on the Håtuna royal estate in Uppland and taken as prisoner to Nyköping Castle (Nyköpingshus).

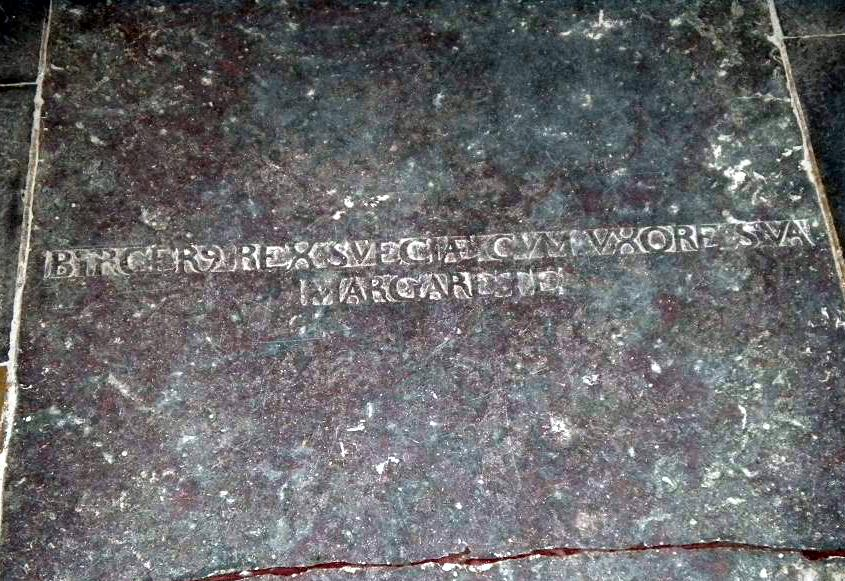
Detail of Birger's and Martha's gravestone at Ringsted

In 1308, Erik and Valdemar were forced by the Danish king to release King Birger, but they did so under humiliating conditions. When King Birger was free, he sought aid in Denmark, and the strife began anew. Birger remained king in name, but had to give up the Royal Domain, exchanging it for eastern Uppland, Närke, his brother Erik's former Duchy Södermanland, Östergötland, Gotland and the Castle of Viborg.

In 1312, Duke Erik married Ingeborg of Norway, daughter of King Haakon V of Norway, in a double wedding in Oslo. At the same time, Duke Valdemar married Ingeborg Eriksdottir of Norway, the daughter of King Eric II of Norway.

Duke Erik also held Bohuslän from Norway as well as northern Halland and was creating a separate kingdom centered on Göta älv. In 1317 however, Birger captured his brothers during the Nyköping Banquet (Nyköpings gästabud), which led to their death. According to Erik's Chronicle (Erikskrönikan), the dukes were starved to death in a cellar of Nyköping Castle.

Birger was ousted by his brothers' supporters in 1318 and eventually went into exile under his brother-in-law King Eric VI of Denmark, taking the Royal Archives with him. His 18-year-old son Magnus had arrived that year with Danish troops to save Birger but an army under Canute Porse defeated them at Söderköping, practically putting an end to the conflict. Birger first fled to Gotland and left Magnus to defend the important Stegeborg Castle. Magnus was captured there only to be executed in Stockholm in 1320, with a younger brother Erik having died the year before and ex-king Birger dying in Denmark the year after. In 1319, the three-year-old son of Duke Erik, also called Magnus, had then already been hailed King of Sweden after the short regency of his mother Duchess Ingeborg.

== Children ==
Birger had the following children with Martha:

- Magnus (c. 1300 – 1320), executed in Sweden
- Erik (d. 1319), archdeacon in Uppsala; died in exile
- Third son of unknown name
- Agnes (d. after 1344), a nun in Slangerup Abbey
- Katarina (d. after 1320); she accompanied Birger and Martha in exile

== Modern depiction ==
In 2003, the band Falconer released The Sceptre of Deception, a concept album based on this period of Swedish history. The album covers events during the reign of King Birger of Sweden and lengthy strife with his brothers, and the Danish and Norwegian crowns.

== Other sources ==
- Barck, Sven Eric; Persson, Åke. Kungligt skvaller genom tusen år: En annorlunda bok om svensk historia. Sundbyberg: Semic, 2000.
- Lindqvist, Herman. Historien om Sverige. Från islossning till kungarike. Norstedts, 1997.
- Harrison, Dick. Jarlens sekel: en berättelse om 1200-talets Sverige. Ordfront, 2002.
- Bergman, Mats. Nyköpingshus. En rundvandring i historia och nutid. Almqvist & Wiksell, 1992.
- Mannervik, Cyrus. Sagor och sägner – Från Nordens forntid och medeltid. AV Carlsons, 1958.

Birger Magnusson House of Bjälbo Born: 1280 Died: 31 May 1321
Regnal titles
Preceded by Magnus Ladulås	King of Sweden; 1290–1318	Vacant Regency of Duchess Ingeborg Title next held by Magnus Eriksson
