= Valdemar Magnusson =

Swedish prince (c. 1285 – 1318)

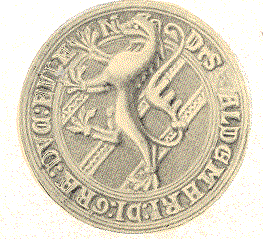
Seal of Duke Valdemar of Finland

Valdemar Magnusson (c. 1285 – 1318) was a Swedish duke from the House of Bjälbo. He was the third son of King Magnus Ladulås and the younger brother of King Birger and Duke Erik.

Valdemar was created Duke of Finland in 1302. Together with his brother Erik, he rebelled against King Birger in a struggle for control of the Swedish kingdom. The brothers captured the king in 1306 in the event known as the Håtuna game, but were later forced to release him through Danish intervention. After the peace of Helsingborg in 1310, the realm was divided between Birger and his brothers, with Valdemar and Erik ruling their portion as a hereditary fief. In 1315, Valdemar and Erik partitioned their territories. Valdemar received the eastern part of the kingdom, including Stockholm and most of Finland, and established his court at Öland.

In 1317, he and his brother were seized by Birger at the Nyköping Banquet and died in captivity the following year. Their deaths led to a rebellion that deposed King Birger and resulted in the accession of Valdemar's nephew Magnus Eriksson to the throne.

== Background ==
Valdemar was born around 1285 as the third son of King Magnus Ladulås and Queen Helvig. Upon his father's death in 1290, the throne passed to his eldest brother Birger, who was still a minor. Sweden was then governed by a regency dominated by Marshal Torgils Knutsson.

In the Bjälbo dynasty, it had become customary to grant the king's younger brothers ducal titles. In 1302, at Birger's coronation, Valdemar was created Duke of Finland, while his brother Erik received a duchy in Sweden. These titles carried both revenues from their respective territories and certain administrative powers, although the king retained ultimate authority.

At the coronation, Valdemar was betrothed to Kristina, the daughter of Marshal Torgils Knutsson, who remained the de facto ruler of Sweden even after Birger's accession.

== Political career ==
The first conflict between the dukes and King Birger arose in 1304, and Birger took control over the castles in Finland. Valdemar then began using the title of Duke of Sweden, like his brother Erik, although his seal still bore the old title.

Valdemar's father-in-law, Torgils Knutsson, was arrested in December 1305 and executed the following February. Valdemar subsequently divorced his wife, claiming that they were spiritually related (baptism siblings) because Torgils was his godfather.

In 1306, in an event known as the Håtuna game, King Birger was captured by his brothers on the Håtuna royal estate in Uppland and taken as prisoner to Nyköping Castle. Two years later, King Eric VI of Denmark forced Valdemar and Erik to release King Birger under humiliating conditions. King Birger sought aid in Denmark after his release and the strife resumed.

In 1310, a peace agreement was concluded at Helsingborg, bringing a temporary end to the conflict between the king and the dukes. The kingdom was divided. Under the terms of the settlement, Birger retained Södermanland, Närke, Östergötland, Gotland, and the castle of Viborg in Finland, while the remaining territories of the realm were granted to Dukes Erik and Valdemar as an inheritable fief. Although the dukes formally swore fealty to Birger, the king exercised no authority over their domains.

Initially, the duchy shared by Erik and Valdemar was not divided between them, and, for example, Finland was administered jointly. In 1315, however, the brothers partitioned their territories: Valdemar received the eastern half, which included Stockholm and parts of Uppland, the castles of Tavastehus and Åbo in Finland, as well as the island of Öland, where he set up his court. Duke Erik established himself in the western part of the realm, along the borderlands adjoining Norway and Denmark, where he also had his Danish and Norwegian fiefs of northern Halland and Kungahälla.

In the fall of 1312 in Oslo, Valdemar married Ingeborg Eiriksdottir, daughter of the late King Eirik II of Norway. It was a double wedding, as Valdemar's brother Erik married Ingeborg Haakonsdotter, daughter of the reigning King Haakon V of Norway. In 1316, Valdemar and Ingeborg had a son, Erik, who is presumed to have died in childhood.

== Death ==
On 10 December 1317, Valdemar and Erik were captured and imprisoned by Birger at the Nyköping Banquet. Valdemar and Erik's wives assumed leadership roles after their husbands' imprisonment. On 16 April 1318, the two duchesses entered into a treaty in Kalmar with Esger Juul, Archbishop of Lund and Christopher, brother of Eric VI of Denmark and Duke of Southern Halland, to free their husbands. This treaty was not honored, and their husbands died later that same year. Although their exact cause of death is unknown, the brothers are thought to have been murdered or starved to death.

The dower Ingeborg had included the island of Öland. Ingeborg was styled Duchess of Öland from at least 1340, surviving her late husband long after his death and staying in Sweden until her own death.

The dukes were initially buried in Stockholm's town church, but their remains were moved to Uppsala Cathedral in the early 1320s. There, they came to be regarded as saints. The cult was likely introduced to strengthen the position of the underage King Magnus Eriksson, and disappeared once the political need vanished. Their grave was rediscovered in 1729.

== Bibliography ==
- The Chronicle of Duke Erik: A Verse Epic from Medieval Sweden. Nordic Academic Press. 2012. ISBN 978-91-87121-32-6. Translated by Erik Carlquist and Peter C. Hogg; introduction by Eva Österberg
- Helle, Knut, ed. (2003). Cambridge History of Scandinavia. 1: Prehistory to 1520. Cambridge University Press. ISBN 978-1-139-05357-0.
- Lovén, Christian; Bengtsson, Herman (2011). "De heliga hertigarna Erik och Valdemar" [The holy dukes Erik and Valdemar]. Historisk Tidskrift (in Swedish). 131 (2): 227–249.
- Scott, Franklin (1988). Sweden, the Nation's History. SIU Press. ISBN 0-8093-1513-0.
- Suvanto, Seppo (2000). "Valdemar Maununpoika". Kansallisbiografia [National Biography of Finland] (via Biografiasampo).
- Tunberg, S. A. D. (1921). "Valdemar, svensk prins". Nordisk familjebok / Uggleupplagan (in Swedish). Vol. 31. Ural - Vertex. p. 384.

Valdemar Magnusson House of Bjälbo Born: 1280s Died: 1318
Preceded by Bengt Birgersson	Duke of Finland; 1300–1318	Succeeded by Bengt Algotsson
