= Erik Magnusson (duke) =

Swedish duke (c. 1282–1318)

- Duke of Södermanland
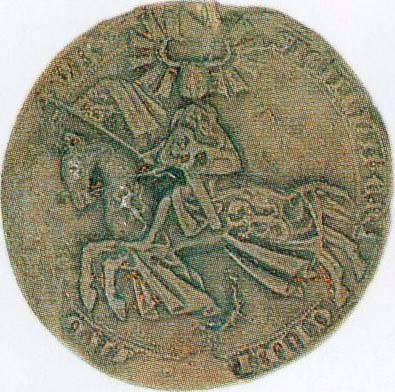
- Erik's royal seal
- Born: c. 1282
- Died: 1318; Nyköping Castle
- Spouse: Ingeborg Haakonsdatter
- Issue: Magnus, King of Sweden and Norway; Euphemia, Duchess of Mecklenburg
- House: Bjälbo
- Father: Magnus Ladulås
- Mother: Helvig of Holstein

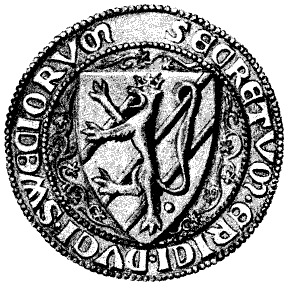
Erik's personal seal

Erik Magnusson (c. 1282 – 1318) was a Swedish prince and Duke of Södermanland, the second son of King Magnus Ladulås. His duchy consisted of large parts of Sweden, as well as smaller parts of Norway and Denmark. He had a troubled relationship with his brother, King Birger Magnusson, resulting in several uprisings. His son, Magnus, became king of Sweden and Norway. The Erik's Chronicle, the oldest Swedish chronicle, is named after him.

== Background ==
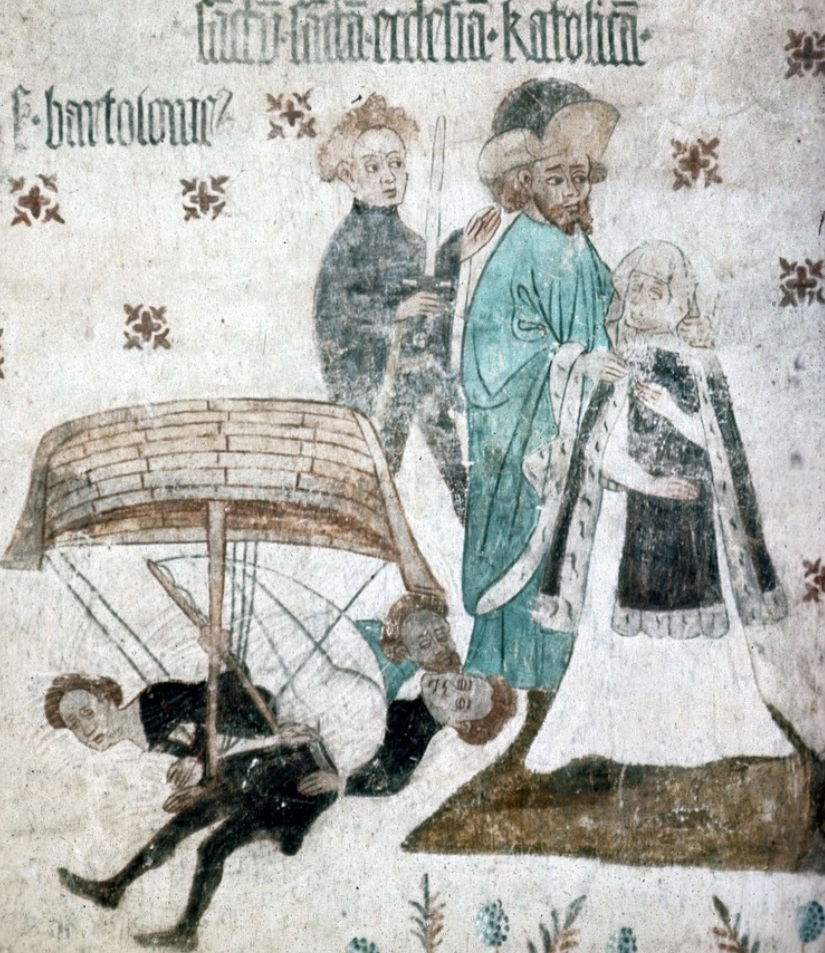
A 1437 painting of Erik rescuing Saint Bridget's mother from a shipwrecking

Erik was born around 1282, the second son of King Magnus Ladulås of Sweden and his queen consort, Helvig of Holstein. In 1284, as his elder brother Birger was designated as the future king, Erik was granted the title of duke, receiving Södermanland and part of Uppland as his fief. However, it was not until Birger's coronation in 1302 that Erik formally assumed his duties as duke.

Historian Jerker Rosén described Erik as an energetic and resourceful political figure who pursued his ambitions with considerable ruthlessness. He gained support from the secular aristocracy in his struggle against his elder brother, King Birger. His younger brother, Valdemar, became his close political ally.

== Life ==
King Birger, who feared his brothers' plans, forced them to sign a paper, in 1304, so as to render them less dangerous. They then fled to Norway, but in 1305, they reconciled with the king and regained their duchies.

Erik was also in possession of Kungahälla, which he had been given during his exile by the Norwegian king, and northern Halland which he had been given by the Danish king Eric VI of Denmark. Duke Erik planned to topple Birger's marshal Torkel Knutsson who was in the way of his ambitious plans. As the clergy were in opposition to the marshal, they joined Erik. They prevailed on the weak Birger in 1306 to execute Torkel, who was a faithful counsellor. Little more than half a year later, Birger was imprisoned by his brothers (September 1306), and his brothers took control of Sweden.

Birger's brother-in-law, Eric VI of Denmark arrived with his army to support Birger. Haakon V of Norway, however, was on the side of the younger brothers. In 1308, Erik and Valdemar were forced by the Danish king to release Birger, but they did so under humiliating conditions. When Birger was free, he sought aid in Denmark, and the strife began anew. The course of events turned against duke Erik. By concluding a peace treaty with the Danish king, unbeknownst to Haakon V, Erik lost Haakon's trust. Håkon wanted to have Kungahälla back, but Erik refused.

=== War ===
A war broke out between Haakon V of Norway and Erik in 1309, and the kings of Norway and Denmark concluded peace, and allied against the dukes. Through his strategic skills, Erik managed to ride out the storm, and defeated the Norwegians, and also the Danes who arrived as far as Nyköping in 1309.

He attacked Norway and reconquered Kungahälla, which he had lost to Haakon in 1310. Finally, there was peace at Helsingborg, in which Sweden was divided between Birger and his brothers. Erik received Västergötland, Dalsland, Värmland and Kalmar County, as well was northern Halland as a fief from Denmark, but he promised to return Kungahälla to Norway.

=== Marriage ===
Despite never returning Kungahälla and breaking almost all his promises to Haakon V, Erik still managed to gain his favor. In 1312, Erik married Haakon's 11-year-old daughter, Ingeborg Haakonsdatter, in a double wedding in Oslo. At the same ceremony, Erik's brother Valdemar married Ingeborg Eriksdottir, the daughter of King Eric II of Norway. In 1316, Duke Erik and Ingeborg had a son, Magnus, who would later become king of both Sweden and Norway. In 1317, they had a daughter, Euphemia, who married Albert II of Mecklenburg; their son, also named Albert, would eventually become king of Sweden.

Duke Erik seemed close to reaching his goals: he was now in possession of a composite territory consisting of some parts of all the three Scandinavian kingdoms, centered on the coast of Skagerrak-Kattegat with Varberg as his ducal seat, he had a son who was the heir apparent of the kingdom of Norway, and he was the de facto ruler of Sweden.

=== Treachery ===
However, his career was stopped and his life was shortened by the treachery of his brother King Birger, the de jure ruler of Sweden. During a call on his brother in Nyköping, the so-called Nyköping Banquet, Erik and his brother Valdemar were arrested and chained, the night between 10 and 11 December 1317. No one knows for certain what happened to the two brothers; it was widely assumed that they were starved to death – and for whatever cause, both died within months of being imprisoned.

At the imprisonment of their husbands, their wives became the leaders of their spouses' followers. On 16 April 1318, the two duchesses entered into a treaty in Kalmar with Esger Juul, Archbishop of Lund and Christopher, brother of Eric VI of Denmark and Duke of Halland-Samsö, to free their husbands. Later the same year their husbands were confirmed to have died.

== Legacy ==
King Birger was subsequently ousted by his brothers' supporters in 1318 and sent into exile to his brother-in-law King Eric VI of Denmark. Erik's son, Magnus was elected king of Sweden on 8 July 1319 and acclaimed as hereditary king of Norway in August of the same year under the regencies of his grandmother Queen Helvig and his mother Duchess Ingeborg.

In all of Scandinavia, the deaths of Erik and Valdemar caused great dismay and sorrow, which caused many people to forgive their misdeeds, and only to remember their positive qualities. However, their ambitions had caused great troubles for Sweden. The time of civil war between the brothers were one of the grimmest eras in Swedish history.

Erik's life was portrayed in a positive light in Erik's Chronicle (Erikskrönikan) created by his supporters. Erik's Chronicle is the oldest surviving Swedish chronicle written between about 1320 and 1335. It is one of Sweden's earliest and most important narrative sources. Its authorship and precise political significance and biases are debated, but it is clear that the chronicle's main protagonist and hero is Erik.

== Sources ==
- Lindqvist, Herman Historien om Sverige. Från islossning till kungarike (Norstedts: 1997)
- Harrison, Dick Jarlens sekel: en berättelse om 1200-talets Sverige (Ordfront. 2002)
- Bergman, Mats Nyköpingshus. En rundvandring i historia och nutid (Almqvist & Wiksell. 1992)
- Mannervik, Cyrus Sagor och sägner – Från Nordens forntid och medeltid (AV Carlsons. 1958)
