= Nyköping Castle =

Medieval castle in Sweden

Coordinates: 58°44′54″N 17°00′42″E

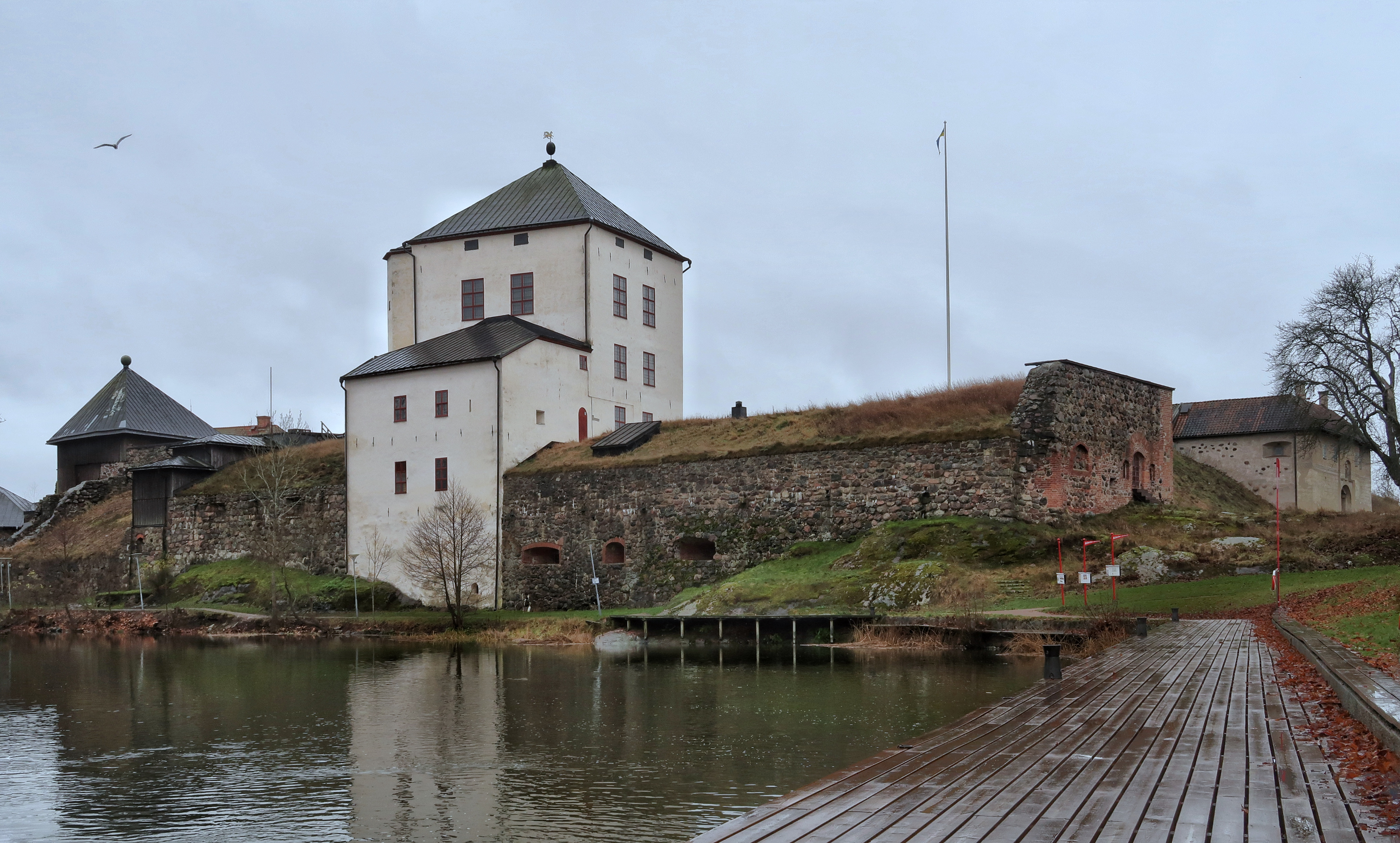
Nyköping Castle

Nyköping Castle (Swedish: Nyköpingshus or Nyköpings slott) is a medieval castle, located in Nyköping, from the Birger Jarl era, partly in ruins, mostly known for the Nyköping Banquet which took place here in 1317.

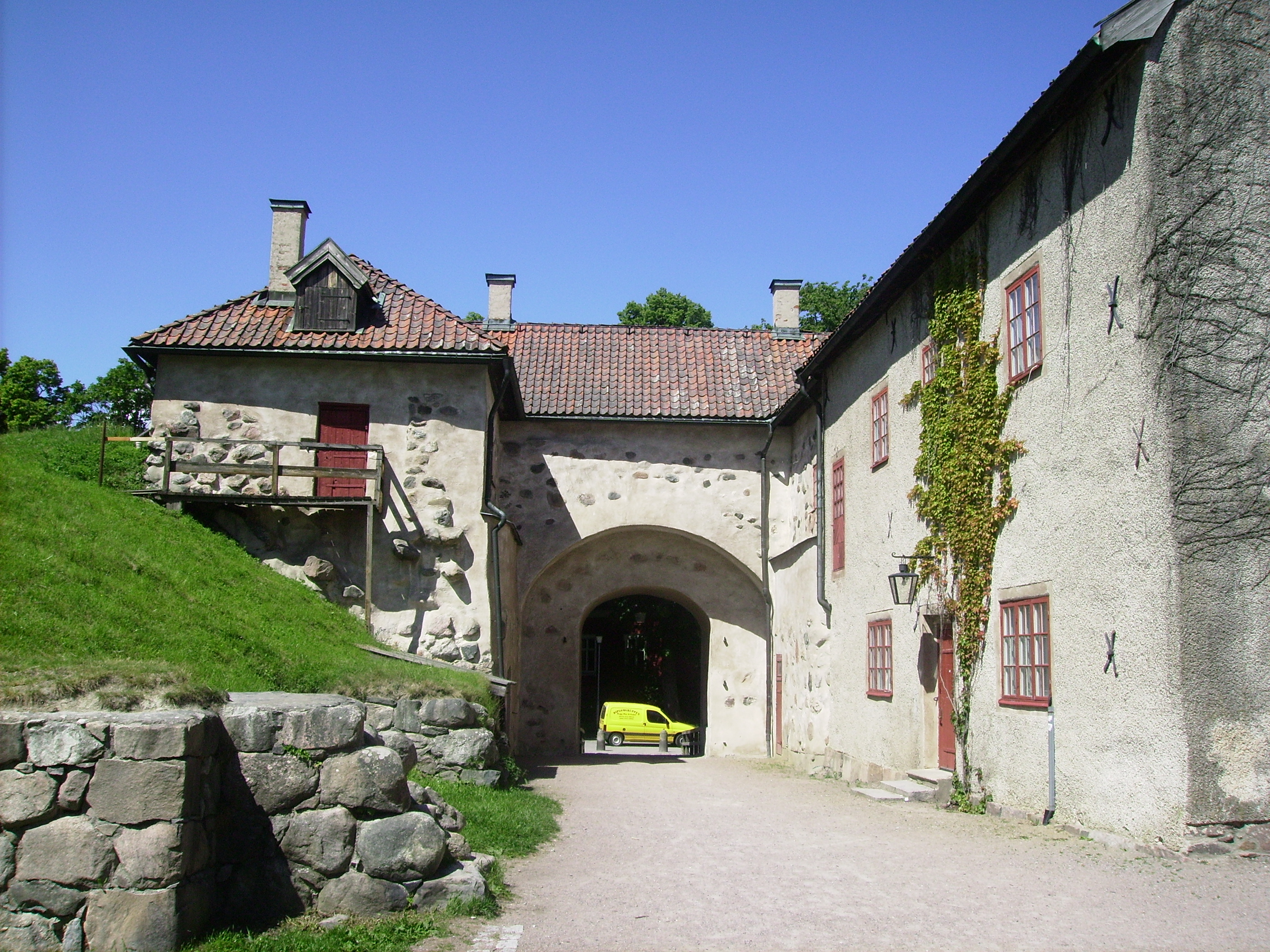
View from the east of the west side entrance

== Construction ==
Construction on the castle is thought to have begun at the end of the 12th century, when it was built as a sort of castellum. It is thought Birger Jarl expanded the building to a larger castle. During the reign of Albert of Sweden the castle was held as a fief by the German knight Raven van Barnekow, who made important improvements on the building, and later by Bo Jonsson Grip. Further reconstructions and expansions were done during the late Middle Ages. Gustav Vasa strengthened the castle further for defensive purposes and a round gun tower from that time remains today.

The medieval castle was rebuilt in the end of the 16th century by Duke Charles (later Charles IX of Sweden) into a renaissance palace. Erik Sparre – taken prisoner after Charles defeated Sigismund III Vasa's forces at the Battle of Stångebro – was held in the castle until his execution at the Linköping Bloodbath. The palace burned down with the rest of the city in 1665. It wasn't reerected; in fact some of its bricks were used in the construction of Stockholm Palace. However, parts of the castle were sound enough to be used as county residence until the 1760s.

Parts of the castle were refurbished in the 20th century. Kungstornet (the King's Tower) and Gamla residenset (the Old Residence) currently house the permanent exhibits of Sörmlands museum (the Museum of Södermanland). A restaurant is located in the banquet hall and Drottningkällaren (the Queen's Cellar).

== Important events ==
- December 11, 1317: the Nyköping Banquet took place in the medieval castle, a Christmas party that ended horribly for the two dukes Eric and Valdemar, brothers to King Birger of Sweden.
- September 20, 1396: the signing of Recess of Nyköping which is one of the most important events of the Nordic Middle Ages since it was a prerequisite for the formation of the Kalmar Union the following year.
- March 3, 1538: wedding between Svante Sture the Younger and Märta Erikdotter Leijonhufvud.
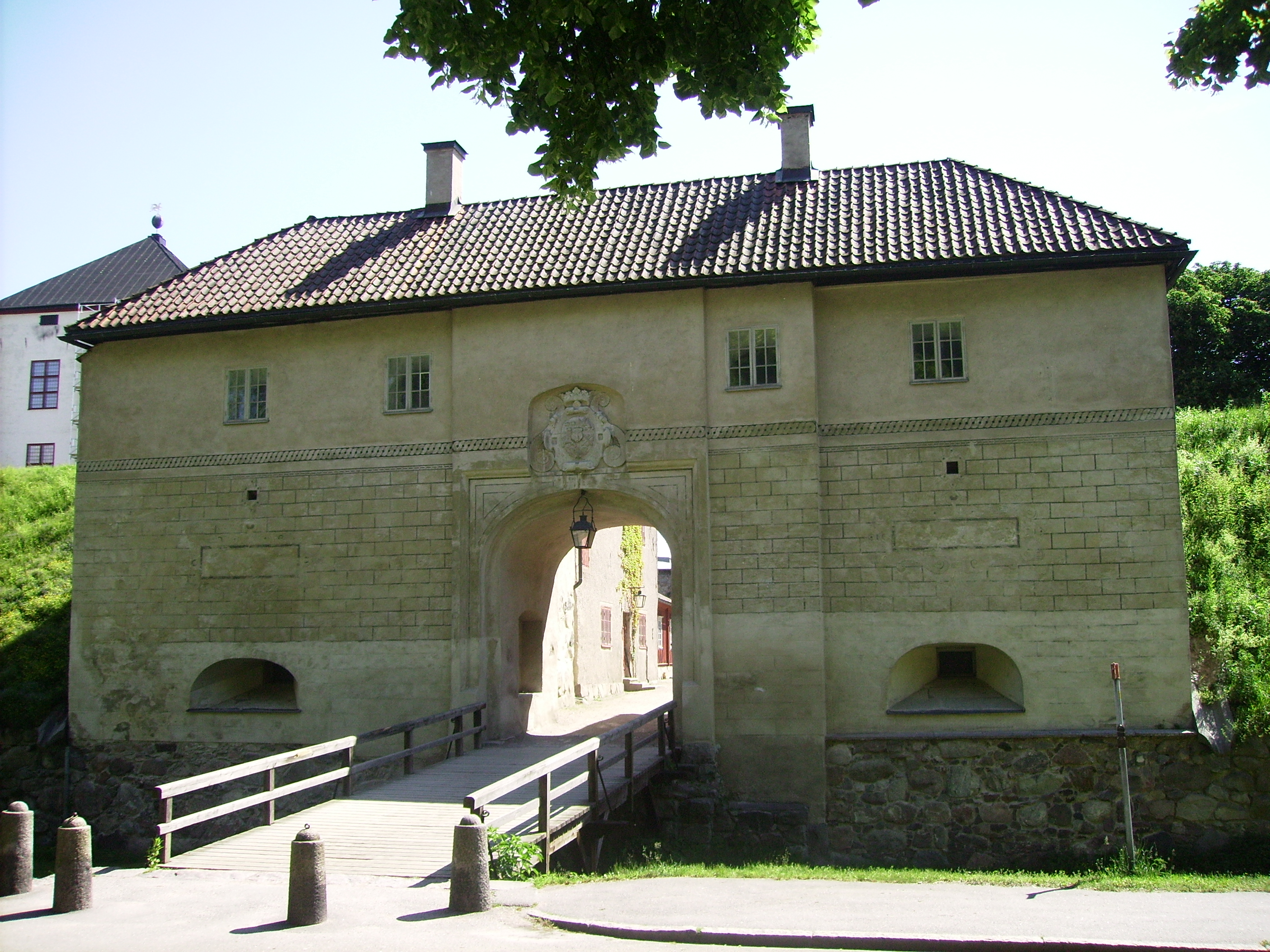
  Nyköping Castle, west side entrance, 'gatehouse'

== Sources ==
- Nyköpingshus - National Property Board
