= Eric VI of Denmark =

King of Denmark from 1286 to 1319

Eric VI Menved
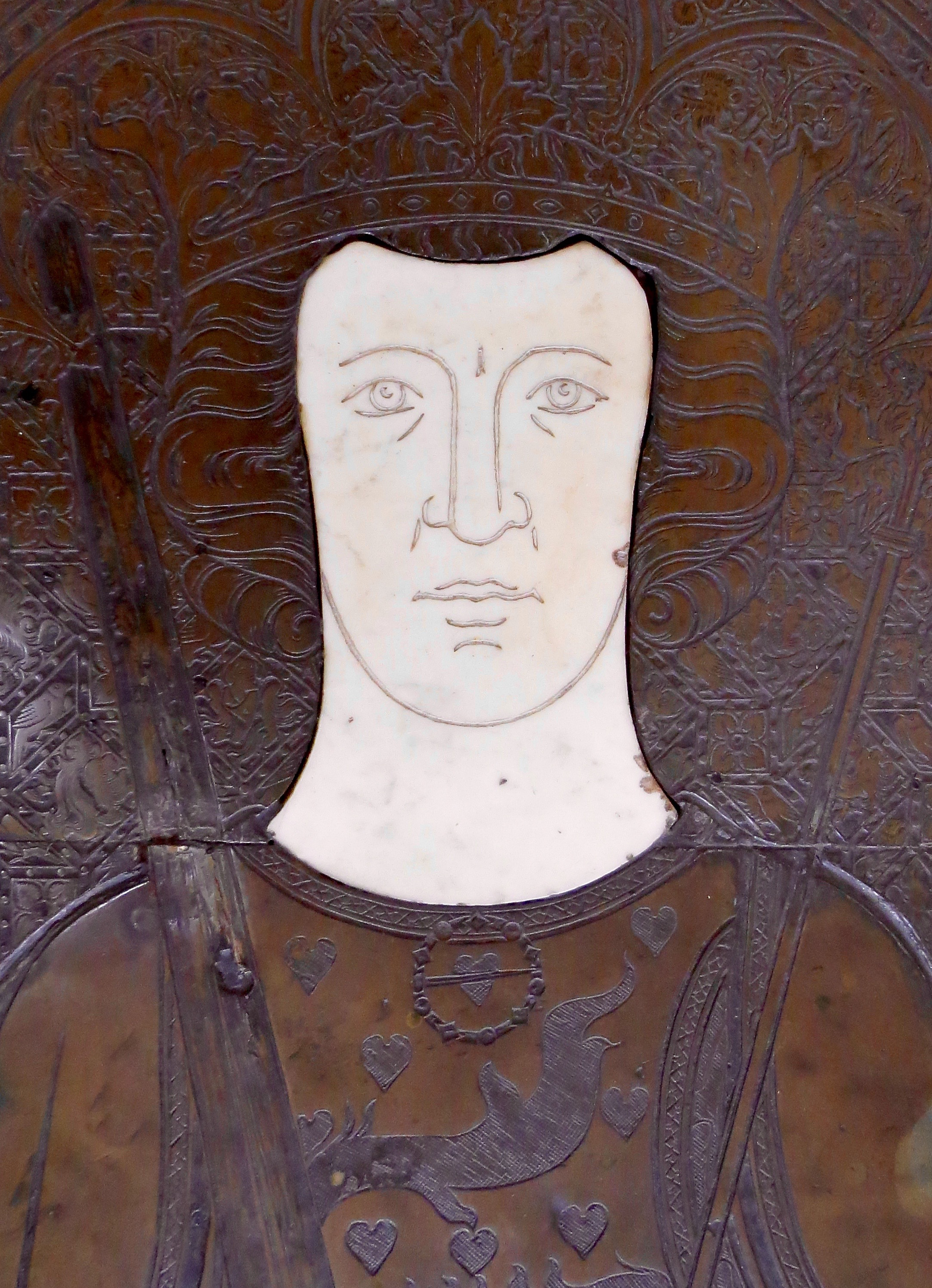
- Eric VI on his tomb

King of Denmark and the Wends
- Reign: 1286–1319
- Coronation: 25 December 1287
- Predecessor: Eric V Klipping
- Successor: Christopher II
- Regent: Agnes of Brandenburg
- Born: 1274
- Died: 13 November 1319 (aged 44–45); Roskilde
- Burial: St. Bendt's Church
- Spouse: Ingeborg Magnusdotter of Sweden (m. 1296; died 1319)
Names
- Eric Eriksen
- House: Estridsen
- Father: Eric V of Denmark
- Mother: Agnes of Brandenburg

Eric VI Menved (1274 – 13 November 1319) was King of Denmark (1286–1319). A son of King Eric V and Agnes of Brandenburg, he became king in 1286 at age 12, when his father was murdered on 22 November by unknown assailants. On account of his age, his mother ruled for him until 1294.

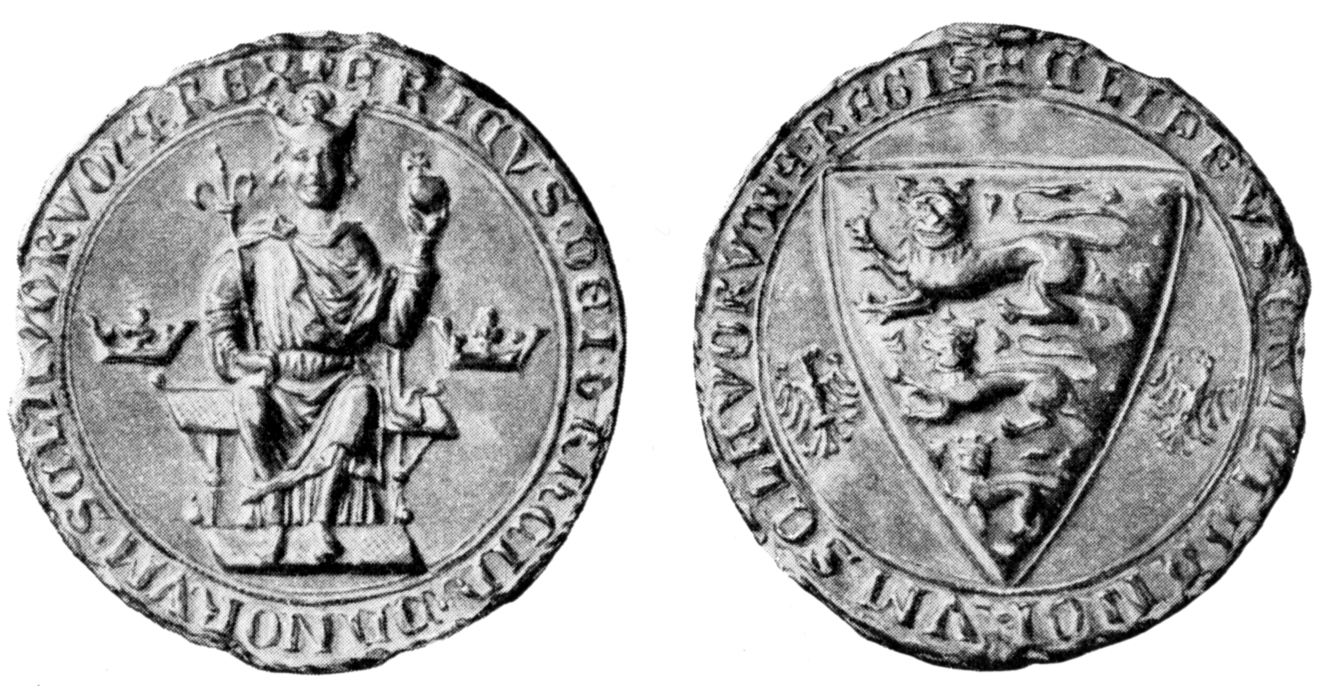
Seal and counter-seal of Eric VI. The small eagles are references to his mother, Agnes of Brandenburg.

== Regency ==
Eric Menved's rule was a central period during the "Age of Decay" in Denmark 1241–1340. His early reign – during which he was led by his mother and her German relatives – was affected by the unrest and wars that followed the murder of his father.

The first act of the new government was to settle the case of the former king's murder at a court convened at Nyborg at Whitsun 1287. Twenty-seven honorable men were appointed to decide the case. Marshal Stig Andersen Hvide and Jacob Nielsen, Count of Halland and seven others were accused. After a one-day trial, the jury found all the accused guilty. The properties and incomes of the condemned were declared forfeit and they were exiled from Denmark on pain of death. Even the pope became involved when he excommunicated those who had been judged guilty.

The verdict was questionable on several counts. None of the accused could be proven to be in the immediate vicinity when the king was stabbed to death. The accused were not allowed to swear their innocence before the court or have other honorable men swear as to their innocence, a right granted to them by law. Despite the unclear circumstances surrounding Eric V's death, the jury only took one day to arrive at a guilty verdict. The accused had all belonged to Erik V's inner circle; it is uncertain what they were supposed to gain by the king's death.

For these reasons historians Erik Arup (1876–1951) and Hugo Yrwing (1908–2002) labelled the verdict as a miscarriage of justice. They consider the murder a result of a power struggle between two noble factions, one led by Marsk Stig and one led by Valdemar, Duke of South Jutland. Duke Valdemar had fallen from grace in 1283, but quickly rose in influence after 1288. They suggest that Valdemar and his allies conspired to kill the king and then to successfully cast suspicion on their rivals at court. Another historian, Kai Hørby (1935–1993) pointed out that the murder might well have its origin in the dynastic struggle for the throne of Denmark. There were others who thought they had equal or better claim to the throne than Eric V, such as Norway's king, Eirik Magnusson and his brother and successor Haakon V who were grandsons of Eric IV of Denmark.

Andersen and the others fled to Norway where they were welcomed by King Eirik who gladly supported enemies of the Danish king. He gave Andersen the fortress of Kongshelle near the border with Denmark. Andersen became a pirate who harried the coast of Denmark for years. The exiles managed to build forts on Samsø, Hjelm, Sprogø, and Helgenæs. No ship was safe and no coastal town immune from Stig Andersen Hvide. The high point of his depredations occurred in 1289 when he landed with a small Norwegian army at Stubbekøbing on Falster. Wizlau II of Rűgen, Denmark's regent, used his Wendish fleet to drive Andersen back to Norway. Andersen's activities sparked four decades of conflict and warfare between the Nordic kingdoms.

== Reign ==
At the same time an ecclesiastical conflict appeared because of the ambitious new Archbishop of Lund Jens Grand who supported the outlaws, his kinsmen, despite his oath to support the king. Once his selection was confirmed by the pope, Bishop Jens reneged on his oath of allegiance. "It doesn't matter to me whether Duke Valdemar, a Jew, a Turk, a pagan, or the devil himself is King of Denmark so long as it is neither Erik nor his brother Christopher," he said. Bishop Jens gave a piece of church land at Hundehals to the exiles to build a fortress and entertained them at his table in public. The king could not tolerate this and ordered Bishop Jens' arrest in 1294. The archbishop was sent to Duke Christopher in chains to be close confined in Søborg's "dark tower". After some months in terrible conditions, the king sent a messenger to Bishop Jens to see if he would swear allegiance again and promise to seek no revenge for his captivity. "Rather than bend to his will, I would rather that the king sliced me apart joint by joint than submit to his commands," the bishop replied. After two years in awful conditions, Bishop Jens managed to escape with the help of a kitchen servant. Bishop Jens fled directly to Rome to lay his case before the Holy See. The pope immediately excommunicated the king and put all of Denmark under interdict until the kingdom paid Archbishop Jens Grand 49,000 silver marks. Denmark could not or would not raise such a sum and languished under interdict for four years. In 1302 King Erik wrote to the pope asking for mercy for himself and the kingdom which had been without any of the sacraments for years. Promising to do whatever the pope said, King Erik humbled himself in public. Pope Boniface VIII – negotiated by Martin (Morten Mogensen) of Dacia – agreed to reduce the fine by 80%, interdict and excommunication were lifted and Archbishop Jens accepted another papal assignment which kept him out of King Erik's hair.

Erik had a great love of tournaments, and money poured out of the treasury for his entertainments. At one knightly tournament at Rostock, wine, mead, and beer "flowed" for an entire month for any who wished to drink. The king paid for the upkeep of all the horses and livestock at the tournament including a mountain of oats for any and all. He crafted new and unusual taxes to squeeze peasants and nobles alike. When the tax money didn't cover his expenses, the king borrowed money heavily from various German nobles, going so far as to mortgage pieces of Denmark to them. Erik sent several expeditions to Germany to win new territories in an attempt to recover Denmark's position as a Scandinavian great power. Through alliances with German princes, among them the Duke of Mecklenburg he managed to become the formal lord of several Hanseatic cities which meant fighting Brandenburg and some other minor states. He also intervened in Sweden in order to support his brother-in-law against the opposition in 1305 and again in 1307–1309 while fighting in Germany at the same time, hiring German troops to turn the tide in his favor.

In 1312 famine struck Denmark and when the king demanded the same taxes as before, the peasants on Zealand rebelled. Erik put down the rebellion fiercely, hanging hundreds of peasants outside Copenhagen. The very next year at the Viborg Assembly (Danish: landsting) the peasant and nobles declared open rebellion against the king. Those who refused to aid the rebels were hanged from their own house beams. Erik put down the rebellion with mercenary troops from Germany, ravaging as far north as Randers. The king began a round of fortress building with peasant slave labor, one of the penalties imposed for rebellion. The nobles involved were exiled or executed and their property taken by the crown. Four such strongholds were constructed; Bygholm in Horsens, Kalø north of Aarhus, Borgvold in Viborg and Ulstrup east of Struer. Niels Brok was executed for hiding Rane Jonsen (1254–1294) who had aided those who murdered Erik's father at Finderup.

In 1313 King Erik surrendered all crown property in southern Jutland to the Duke for cash. From 1315 to 1317 the crops failed yet again. There was nothing left to tax. The treasury was empty. In 1317 Erik mortgaged all of the island of Funen to Gerhard III, Count of Holstein-Rendsburg and John II, Count of Holstein-Kiel for 200 mounted knights. Before he died, Erik also mortgaged Skåne to German nobles for money to continue his extravagances. As a last blow to Danish pride, Henry II, Lord of Mecklenburg captured the Danish fortress at Rostock.

When Erik died in 1319, having survived all 14 of his children, Denmark was bankrupt. He was succeeded by his younger brother Christopher (1276–1332) who ruled Denmark as King Christopher II between 1320 and 1326.

== Judgements ==
Traditionally the rule of Eric VI has been regarded one of the few bright spots of the period because of his attempt to recover Denmark's far-flung empire. He has been hailed in Danish romantic literature. Viewed today, however, his policies began the dissolution of the Danish empire in the Baltic and northern Europe that followed during the next generation.

The nickname of King Eric has been much discussed. A popular explanation is that it is an abbreviation of his alleged favourite oath (“ved alle hellige mænd” – Eng.: by all holy men). Another explanation is that it derives from the elder Danish “menvett” (Eng.: bird of ill omen).

== Children and family ==
Erik was married in June 1296 to Ingeborg Magnusdotter of Sweden. She was the daughter of King Magnus Ladulås of Sweden and sister of Birger, King of Sweden. The couple had eight sons who died as children, as well as six miscarriages, although the sources differ between eight and fourteen children: her many pregnancies led to miscarriages, or the birth of children who died soon after.

- Valdemar (d. 1302)
- Eric
- Magnus
- An unnamed son (born and died 1318); according to tradition, Queen Ingeborg was so happy to finally have a live born child, she took the boy out for a carriage ride to show him off, holding him out the window, where she lost her grip on him, and he fell and broke his neck. Queen Ingeborg subsequently entered the Convent of St. Clare in Roskilde where she died the following year.

Evidence also indicate Eric VI may have had an illegitimate son or possibly a son of Ingeborg later in life named Erik Sjællandsfar (c. 1300–1364) at Orebygård on Zealand, buried in Roskilde Cathedral with a crown. However, other theories indicate that he was a son of King Valdemar IV of Denmark.

== Other sources ==
- Arup, Erik (1951) Danmarks historie (Copenhagen: Hagerup)
- Fagerland, Tor Einar (2006) Krigføring og politisk kultur i nordisk middelalder, (NTNU)
- Hørby, Kai (1989) Gyldendals og Politikens -danmarkshistorie. 1250-1400 (Copenhagen: Gyldendal)

Media related to Eric VI of Denmark at Wikimedia Commons

Eric Menved House of Estridsen Born: 1274 Died: 13 November 1319
Regnal titles
Preceded by Eric V	King of Denmark; Duke of Estonia; 1286–1319	Succeeded by Christopher II
