= Danneskiold-Samsøe =

Danish noble family

- Danish High Noble Family
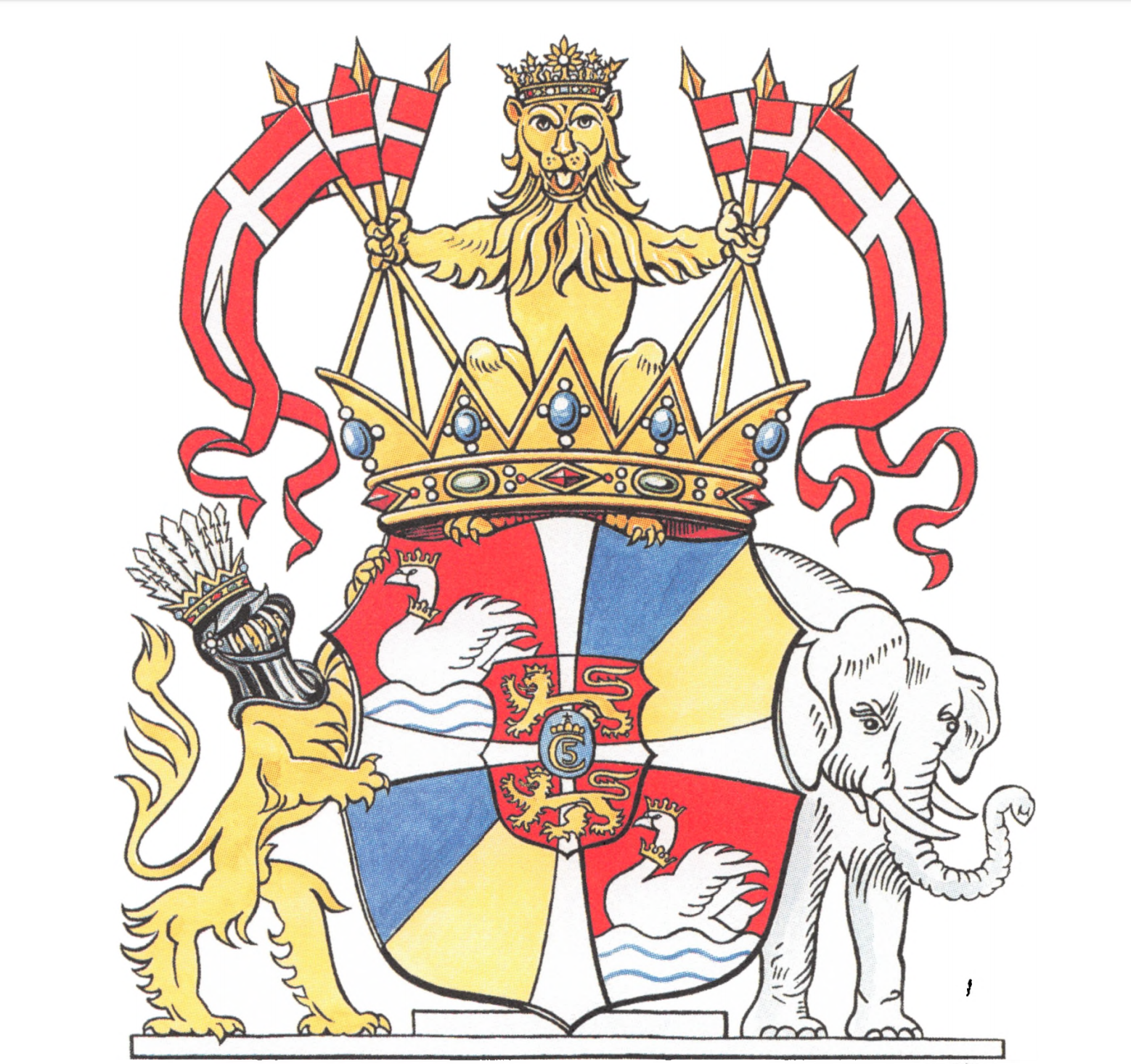

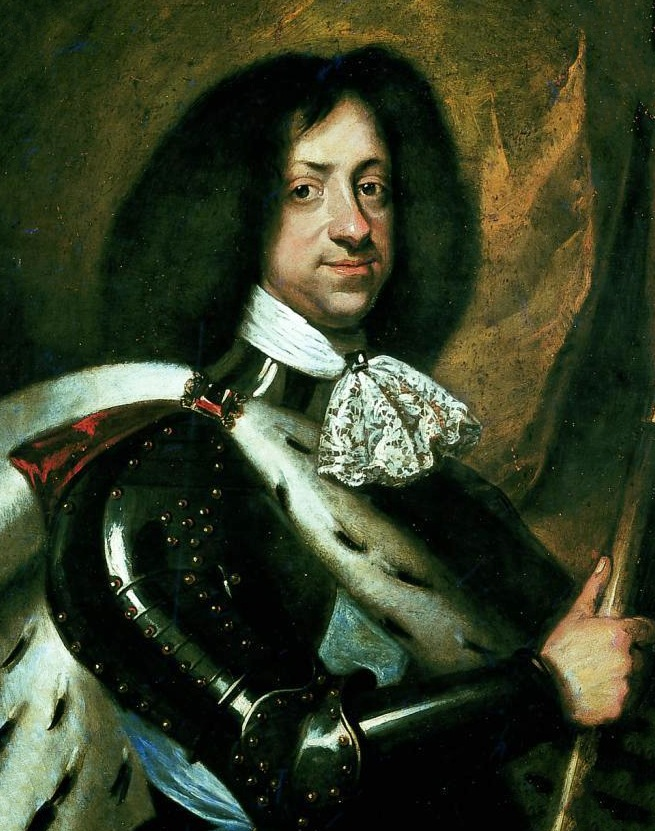
- Christian V of Denmark and Norway, the progenitor of the Danneskiold-Samsøe family
- Parent family: The House of Oldenburg (House of Glücksburg)
- Current region: Denmark
- Founded: 1695; 331 years ago
- Current head: Mikkel Archibald Valdemar Christian Lensgreve of Danneskiold-Samsøe (b. 1971)
- Titles: Count Danneskiold-Samsøe; Count/Countess of Samsøe; Lensgreve Danneskiold-Samsøe; Comtesse Danneskiold-Samsøe
- Style: Male-line descendants: "His Excellency"
- Connected members: The Danish Royal Family; The Norwegian royal family The Greek royal family The British royal family

The House of Danneskiold-Samsøe is a Danish family of high nobility who formerly held the island of Samsø as a fief. They represent an illegitimate branch of the House of Oldenburg, which means that they share ancestry with the Danish Royal Family and other European royal families belonging to this same House.

By royal statutory regulation, the Counts Danneskiold-Samsøe and their male-line descendants are ranked as the second-highest nobles in Denmark, second only to the Counts of Rosenborg, who also descend from the Danish Kings. With a place in the 1st Class No. 13, they are entitled to the style "His/Her Excellency".

The family uses a traditional spelling of the name; a modern spelling would be Danneskjold-Samsø.

== History ==
The name was created for several descendants of Danish monarchs of the House of Oldenburg, born of their liaisons with royal mistresses. The first grantees were children from the 1677 marriage between Countess Antoinette von Aldenburg and Ulrik Frederik Gyldenløve, Count of Laurvig, a celebrated (Norwegian) general and the son of Frederick III of Denmark by his mistress Margrethe Pape. King Christian V, the count's half-brother, granted a comital title to all of his male-line descendants.

The next grantees were all the children of Christian Gyldenløve, Count of Samsø, the eldest son of Christian V by his mistress Sophie Amalie Moth in 1696. He married his cousin, Countess Antoinette Augusta von Aldenburg (1660–1701) (eldest daughter of Count Anton I von Aldenburg und Knyphausen and his first wife, Countess Auguste Johanna zu Sayn-Wittgenstein-Hohenstein (1638–1669), himself a legitimated son of Anton Gunther, last independent Count of Oldenburg). The male Danneskiold-Laurvigen line was extinguished in 1783, and the Laurvig countship was inherited through an heiress by the noble Danish line of Ahlefeldt family. In 1786, François Xavier Joseph Gyldenløve, second Count of Løvendal, great-grandson of Count Ulrik Frederik's first marriage, was granted the surname Danneskiold as well; but this Danneskiold-Løvendal branch, too, was extinguished in its male line upon the death of his childless son in 1829. The first marriage of Count Christian produced only daughters, but the issue of his second marriage succeeded to the countship of Samsø and continues in male line, bearing the surname "Danneskiold-Samsøe".

All Danneskiolds since 1829 have been descendants of the eldest son of Christian V and his mistress Sofie Amalie Moth (1654–1719), whom the king elevated to be the first Lensgrevinde til Samsø ("Countess of Samsø"). A descendant, Countess Frederikke Louise Danneskiold-Samsøe (1699–1744), married her kinsman Christian August, Duke of Schleswig-Holstein-Sonderburg-Augustenburg (1696–1754), a partitioned-off duke, and from whose marriage all the future Augustenburgs descend.

The present comital family is related to a number of noble families such as Ahlefeldt, Wedel, Moltke, Kaas, Trolle, Ulfeldt, Huitfeldt, Sehested, Gyldenstierne, Rosenkrantz, Rantzau, Reventlow, Frijs-Frijsenborg and Brahe. Today, the head of the family is Mikkel Archibald Valdemar Christian Count of Danneskiold-Samsoe (b. 1971), with the style of Excellency.

=== Other Danneskiolds ===
==== Danneskiold-Løvendal ====
Frederik III's son with Margrethe Pape, Ulrik Frederik Gyldenløve's sons from his first marriage to Sophie Urne, Carl and Woldemar (1660–1740) became barons of Løvendal in 1662, the latter's son Ulrik Frederik Woldemar was elevated in 1741 by the king of Poland to regent, and his son, Major General and French Marshal François Xavier Joseph Danneskiold-Løvendal (1742–1808), was admitted in 1778 to the Danish court with the name Danneskiold-Løvendal. This line became extinct in 1829 with his son Carl Valdemar Count Danneskiold-Løvendal (1773–1829).

==== Danneskiold-Laurvig ====
Ulrik Frederik Gyldenløve's children from his third marriage to Countess Antoinette Augusta von Aldenburg were named Danneskiold in 1693. The son, Ferdinand Anton, founded the count's line Danneskiold-Laurvig. He owned the County of Laurvig in Norway, was director of the West Indies-Guinea Company and built it since the Counts Moltke belonging to the Palace in Bredgade in Copenhagen. With his son Christian Conrad, Count Danneskiold-Laurwigen, the line also died out in 1783.

== Notable family members ==
- Frederik Danneskiold-Samsøe (1703–1770), politician, minister, admiral, chief of the Danish-Norwegian marine
- Christian Conrad Danneskiold-Samsøe (1774–1823), councillor, board member, landowner and magistrate
- Henriette Danneskiold-Samsøe (1776–1843), businesswoman, founder of Holmegaard Glass Factory
- Countess Louise Sophie Danneskiold-Samsøe (1796–1867)
- Christian Conrad Sophus Danneskiold-Samsøe (1836–1908), theatre director
- Henrietta Danneskiold-Samsøe (1836–1880), British courtier
- Ulrich Friedrich Woldemar von Löwendal (1700–1755)
- Ferdinand Anton Danneskiold-Laurvig (1688–1754)

== Agnatic succession ==
- Elimar I, Count of Oldenburg (1040–1108)
  - Elimar II, Count of Oldenburg (1070–1142)
    - Christian I, Count of Oldenburg († 1167)
      - Maurice, Count of Oldenburg (1145–1211)
        - Christian II, Count of Oldenburg (1184–1233)
          - John I, Count of Oldenburg (1204–1270)
            - Christian III, Count of Oldenburg (1234–1285)
              - John II, Count of Oldenburg (1272–1315)
                - Conrad I, Count of Oldenburg (1300–1347)
                  - Christian V, Count of Oldenburg (1342–1399)
                    - Dietrich, Count of Oldenburg (1390–1440)
                      - King Christian I of Denmark (1426–1481)
                        - King Frederick I of Denmark (1471–1533)
                          - King Christian III of Denmark (1503–1559)
                            - King Frederick II of Denmark (1534–1588)
                              - King Christian IV of Denmark (1577–1648)
                                - King Frederick III of Denmark (1577–1648)
                                  - Ulrik Frederik Gyldenløve, Count of Løvendal (1638–1704)
                                    - Count Carl Danneskiold-Løvendal (1660–1689)
                                    - Count Woldemar Danneskiold-Løvendal (1660–1740)
                                      - Count Ulrich Friedrich Danneskiold-Løvendal (1694–1754)
                                      - Count Ulrich Friedrich Woldemar Danneskiold-Løvendal (1700–1755)
                                        - Count Woldemar Henrik Danneskiold-Løvendal (1723–1724)
                                        - Count Frederik Woldemar Danneskiold-Løvendal (1724–1740)
                                        - Count Franz Xaver Danneskiold-Løvendal (1742–1808)
                                          - Count Carl Woldemar Danneskiold-Løvendal (1773–1829)
                                    - Count Ulrik Frederik Danneskiold-Laurvig (1678)
                                    - Count Christian Anton Danneskiold-Laurvig (1679–1679)
                                    - Count Frederik Christian Danneskiold-Laurvig (1681–1696)
                                    - Ferdinand Anton, Count of Laurvig (1688–1754)
                                      - Count Frederik Ludwig Danneskiold-Laurvig (1717–1762)
                                        - Count Christian Frederik Danneskiold-Laurvig (1717–1762)
                                      - Count Ulrich Ferdinand Danneskiold-Laurvig (1720)
                                      - Count Christian Conrad Danneskiold-Laurvig (1723–1783)
                                  - King Christian V of Denmark (1646–1699)
                                    - King Frederick IV of Denmark (1646–1699)
                                    - Prince Christian William of Denmark (1672–1673)
                                    - Prince Christian of Denmark (1675–1695)
                                    - Prince Charles of Denmark (1680–1729)
                                    - Prince William of Denmark (1687–1705)
                                    - Christian Gyldenløve, Count of Samsøe (1674–1703)
                                      - Count Christian Danneskiold-Samsøe (1702–1728)
                                        - Count Frederik Christian Danneskiold-Samsøe (1722–1778)
                                          - Count Christian Conrad Danneskiold-Samsøe (1774–1823)
                                            - Count Frederik Christian Danneskiold-Samsøe (1798–1869)
                                            - Count Christian Conrad Sophus Danneskiold-Samsøe (1800–1886)
                                              - Count Christian Danneskiold-Samsøe (1838–1914)
                                                - Count Christian Emil Robert Danneskiold-Samsøe (1884–1886)
                                                - Count Aage Conrad Danneskiold-Samsøe (1886–1945)
                                              - Count Christian Ernest Danneskiold-Samsøe (1840–1908)
                                            - Count Magnus Otto Sophus Danneskiold-Samsøe (1804–1894)
                                              - Count Christian Conrad Sophus Danneskiold-Samsøe (1836–1908)
                                                - Count Christian Valdemar Danneskiold-Samsøe (1864–1931)
                                                  - Count James Christian Carl Sophus Danneskiold-Samsøe (1900–1966)
                                                    - Count Valdemar Dale Danneskiold-Samsøe (1935–2016)
                                                      - Count Mikkel Archibald Valdemar Christian Danneskiold-Samsøe (born 1971)
                                                      - (1) Count Frederik Valdemar Mikkel Hannibal Danneskiold-Samsøe (b. 1985)
                                                      - (2) Count Christian Valdemar Gustav Mikkel Danneskiold-Samsøe (b. 1987)
                                                      - (3) Count Kevin Christopher Christian Mikkel Danneskiold-Samsøe (b. 1990)
                                                      - (4) Count Sofus Charles Valdemar Mikkel Danneskiold-Samsøe (b. 1992)
                                                      - Count Oliver James Mikkel Alexander Danneskiold-Samsøe (2000–2016)
                                                - Count Viggo Danneskiold-Samsøe (1874–1936)
                                                  - Count Knud Danneskiold-Samsøe (1900–1969)
                                                  - Count Hans Christian Erik Viggo Danneskiold-Samsøe (1915–1975)
                                                    - (5) Count Carl Christian Erik Leopold Danneskiold-Samsøe (b. 1945)
                                                    - (6) Count Frederik Jost Conrad Erling Danneskiold-Samsøe (b. 1946)
                                                    - (7) Count Christian Jürg Heinrich Caspar Danneskiold-Samsøe (b. 1951)
                                                    - (8) Count Kaj Ulf Carl Johan Danneskiold-Samsøe (b. 1959)
                                                    - (9) Count Ulrik Otto Hubert Viggo Danneskiold-Samsøe (b. 1965)
                                                      - (10) Count Philip Christian Ulrik Manuel Danneskiold-Samsøe (b. 1989)
                                                      - (11) Count Niklas Christian Sophus Laszlo Danneskiold-Samsøe (b. 1990)
                                                  - Count Niels Frederik Kjeld Viggo Danneskiold-Samsøe (1916–1994)
                                                    - (12) Count Ulrik Christian Lauritz Danneskiold-Samsøe (b. 1945)
                                                      - (13) Count Niels Danneskiold-Samsøe (b. 1982)
                                                    - (14) Count Otto Frederik Aage Danneskiold-Samsøe (b. 1947)
                                                      - (15) Count Rolf Danneskiold-Samsøe (b. 1976)
                                                      - (16) Count Helge Danneskiold-Samsøe (b. 1981)
                                                    - (17) Count Kjeld Viggo Gerhard Danneskiold-Samsøe (b. 1952)
                                                  - Count Oluf Erling Christoffer Viggo Danneskiold-Samsøe (1917)
                                                  - Count Ubbe Eyvind Gregers Sophus Viggo Danneskiold-Samsøe (1921–1978)
                                                    - (18) Count Jakob Frederik Christian Danneskiold-Samsøe (b. 1968)
                                                      - (19) Count Julius Valentin Danneskiold-Samsøe (b. 1991)
                                                    - (20) Count Johan Conrad Sophus Danneskiold-Samsøe (b. 1970)
                                                      - (21) Count Valdemar August Theodor Danneskiold-Samsøe (b. 2008)
                                                      - (22) Count Vilfred Arthur Cornelius Danneskiold-Samsøe (b. 2012)
                                                - Count Knud Danneskiold-Samsøe (1876–1957)
                                              - Count Frederik Vilhelm Steen Danneskiold-Samsøe (1837–1895)
                                                - Count Frederik Sophus Christian Ludvig Danneskiold-Samsøe (1864–1944)
                                                - Count Einar Carl Otto Danneskiold-Samsøe (1868–1908)
                                                - Count Axel Edzard Ernest Danneskiold-Samsøe (1871–1925)
                                                  - Count Palle Julian Danneskiold-Samsøe (1906–1968)
                                                    - (23) Count Thomas Godske Danneskiold-Samsøe (b. 1946)
                                                      - (24) Count Mikkel Frederik Danneskiold-Samsøe (b. 1985)
                                              - Count Otto Ludvig August Balthazar Danneskiold-Samsøe (1841–1896)
                                                - Count Adam Sophus Danneskiold-Samsøe (1874–1961)
                                                  - Count Adam Otto Danneskiold-Samsøe (1910–1981)
                                                    - (25) Count Bent Otto Aksel Danneskiold-Samsøe (b. 1943)
                                                    - (26) Count Adam Peter Wilhelm Danneskiold-Samsøe (b. 1946)
                                                  - Count Ludvig Danneskiold-Samsøe (1926–1990)
                                          - Count Ulrik Adolph Danneskiold-Samsøe (1723–1751)
                                      - Count Friedrich Danneskiold-Samsøe (1703–1770)
                                        - Count Christian Ulrich Danneskiold-Samsøe (1725–1726)
                                    - Ulrik Christian Gyldenløve, Count of Samsø (1678–1719)
