= Duke of Samsø =

Duke of Samsø was a title created for Canute Porse the Elder in the 14th century which was later recreated as the Landgraviate of Samsø in the 18th century.

== History ==
Then the Island was part of the crown domain until the end of the 14th century when it was pledged to the Bishop of Aarhus. However it was redeemed to the Danish crown in 1407.

Later the Island was under royal control and was granted to Sophie Amalie Moth mistress of Christian V of Denmark. The title descended to their children. Under Danish law all sons of the titled nobility inherited the title but the estate was kept by the eldest male resulting in many offshoots.

== Dukes of Samsø ==
Ruler	Born	Reign	Death	House	Consort	Notes
Valdemar the Young	1209	1215-1231	1231	House of Estridsen	Eleanor of Portugal, Queen of Denmark	Possibly Held Samso as he was crowned Junior king on the island
Albert I, Duke of Brunswick	1236	1253	1279	House of Welf	Elizabeth of Brabant	Pledged to Albert
Stig Andersen Hvide	13th century	1289	1293	Hvide		Occupied the island briefly
Christopher II of Denmark	1276	1307-1326	1332	House of Estridsen	Euphemia of Pomerania	Granted by his brother when he was not king
Canute Porse the Elder	1282	1326-1330	1330	Porse	Ingeborg of Norway	Married Royalty, granted Samso by the Danish king
Ingeborg of Norway	1301	1330-1344	1361	House of Sverre	Canute Porse the Elder	Inherited from her husband, eventually lost the island to the king

Ruler	Born	Reign	Death	House	Consort	Notes
Sophie Amalie Moth	1654	1777-1698	1719	Moth (noble family)	Christian V of Denmark	She was the mistress of Christian V who he granted the title to
Christian Gyldenløve	1674	1698-1703	1703	Gyldenløve	Charlotte Amalie Danneskiold-Laurvig	Illegitimate Son of Christian V of Denmark and the preceding
Christian Danneskiold-Samsøe	1702	1703-1728	1728	Danneskiold-Samsøe	Conradine Christiane Friis, Christina Catharina von Holstein	Son of the preceding
Frederik Danneskiold-Samsøe	1703	1703-1770	1770	Danneskiold-Samsøe		Brother of the preceding
Frederik Christian Danneskiold-Samsøe	1722	1728-1778	1778	Danneskiold-Samsøe	Nicoline Rosenkrantz	Son of the Christian Danneskiold-Samsøe
Christian Conrad Sophus Danneskiold-Samsøe	1774	1778-1823	1823	Danneskiold-Samsøe	Henriette Danneskiold-Samsøe	Son of the preceding
Frederik Christian Danneskiold-Samsøe	1798	1823-1869	1869	Danneskiold-Samsøe		Son of the preceding
Christian Conrad Sophus Danneskiold-Samsøe II	1800	1869-1886	1886	Danneskiold-Samsøe	Wanda Sophie Elisabeth Candia Zahrtmann	Son of the preceding
Christian Danneskiold-Samsøe	1838	1886-1914	1914	Danneskiold-Samsøe		Son of the preceding
Aage Danneskiold-Samsøe	1886	1914-1945	1945	Danneskiold-Samsøe		Son of the preceding
