= Gyldenløve =

Family name

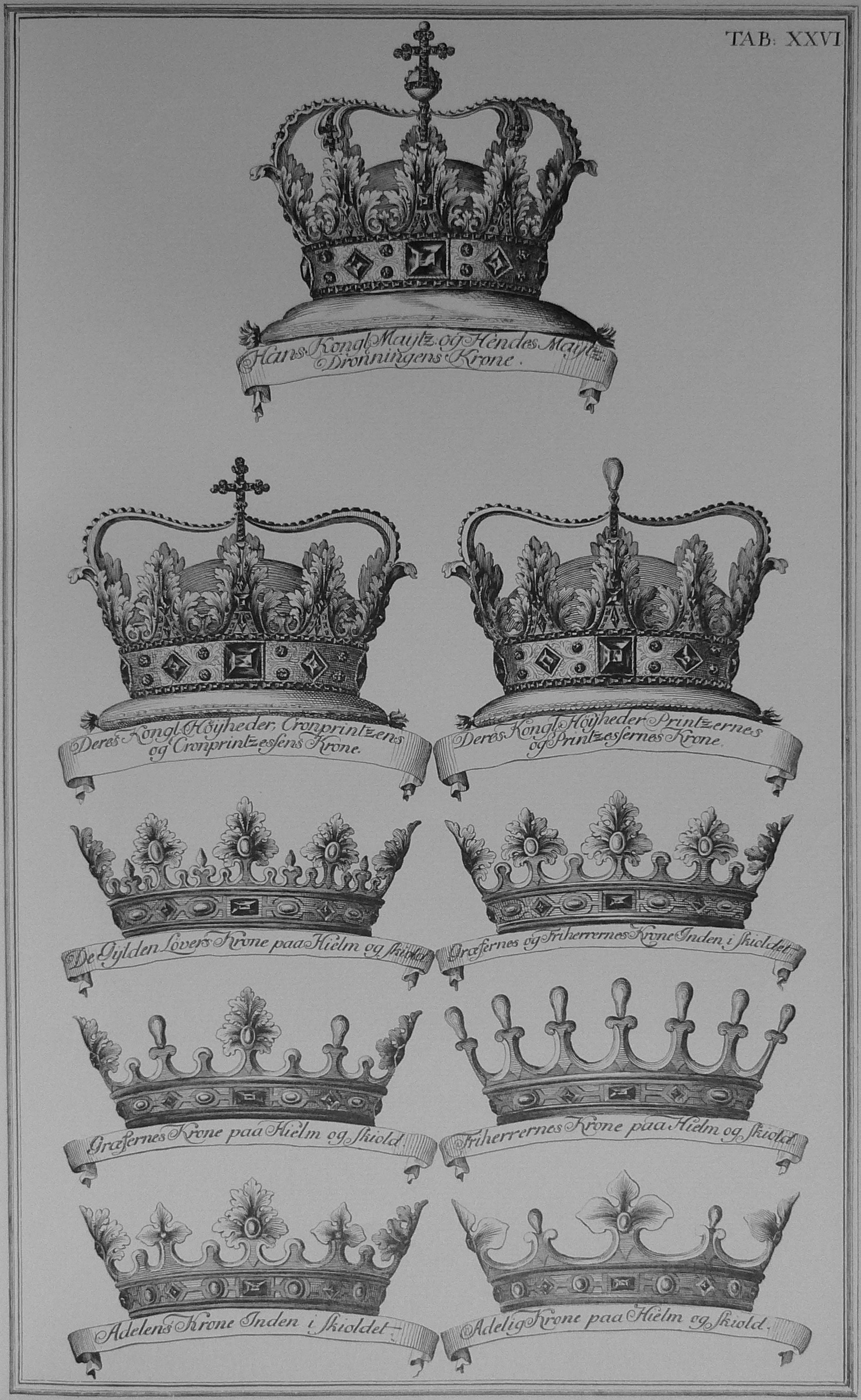
The Golden Lions (illegitimate children) had the right to bear an exclusive coronet different from those of counts, barons, and untitled nobles. Shown here second from the top, in the first column.

Gyldenløve (Danish: [kylənløːwə]; lit. 'Golden Lion') was a surname for several illegitimate children of Oldenburg kings of Denmark-Norway in the 17th century.

== Kings ==
The surname Gyldenløve was given to the sons of the following Dano-Norwegian kings:

- Christian IV (1588–1648)
- Frederick III (1648–1670)
- Christian V (1670–1699)

=== Christian IV ===
Christian IV had many illegitimate children by various mistresses. Three of his illegitimate sons were officially recognised and given the surname Gyldenløve:

- Christian Ulrik (1611–1640) by Kirsten Madsdatter
- Hans Ulrik (1615–1645) by Karen Andersdatter
- Ulrik Christian (1630–1658) by Vibeke Kruse

=== Frederick III ===
Frederick III fathered Ulrik Frederick (1638–1704) by Margrethe Pape, who was also acknowledged and given the surname Gyldenløve. Ulrik Frederick earned great respect from Norwegians while serving as a Statholder in Norway. Ulrik's grandson Ulrich Friedrich Woldemar von Löwendal, was granted the title of Imperial Count in 1741 and his line became Counts von Löwendal.

=== Christian V ===
Christian V fathered five children with Sophie Amalie Moth:

- Christiane Gyldenløve (1672–1689)
- Christian Gyldenløve (1674–1703)
- Sophie Christiane Gyldenløve (1675–1684)
- Anna Christiane Gyldenløve (1676–1689)
- Ulrik Christian Gyldenløve (1678–1719), Count of Samsø. (Not to be confused with the son of Christian IV.)

== See also ==
- Fitzroy
