= Danneskiold-Laurvig Mansion =

- Danneskiold-Laurvigs Palæ
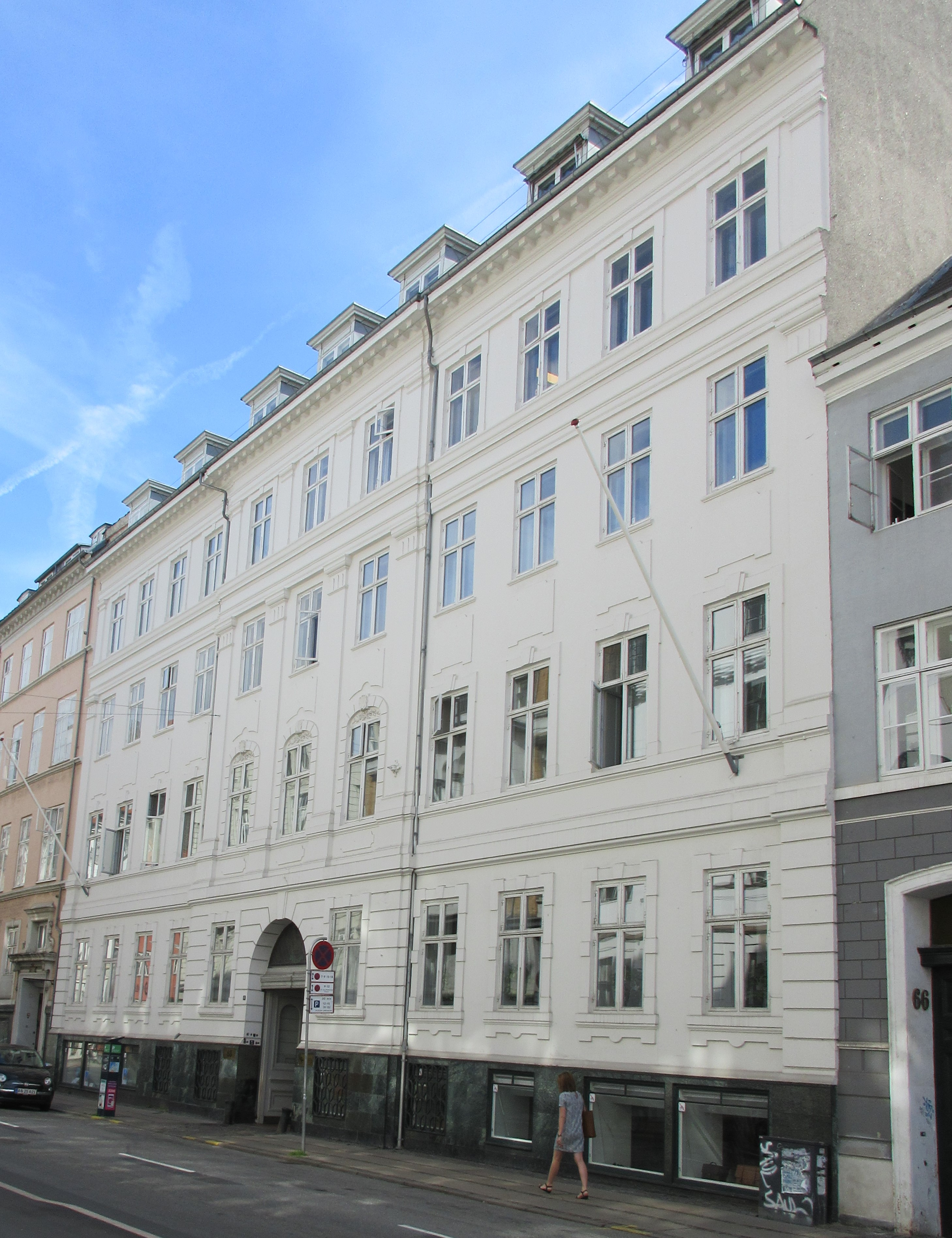
- Interactive map of the Danneskiold-Laurvig Mansion area

General information
- Architectural style: Rococo
- Location: Copenhagen, Denmark
- Coordinates: 55°41′3.41″N 12°35′16.38″E
- Completed: 1746
- Client: Ferdinand Anton Danneskiold-Laurvig
- Owner: SEB Pension

Design and construction
- Architect: Johann Adam Soherr

The Danneskiold-Laurvig Mansion is a historic building situated at Store Kongensgade 68 in central Copenhagen, Denmark. It was built in association with the Moltke's Mansion in Bredgade on the other side of the block.

== History ==
=== Danneskiold-Laurvig family ===
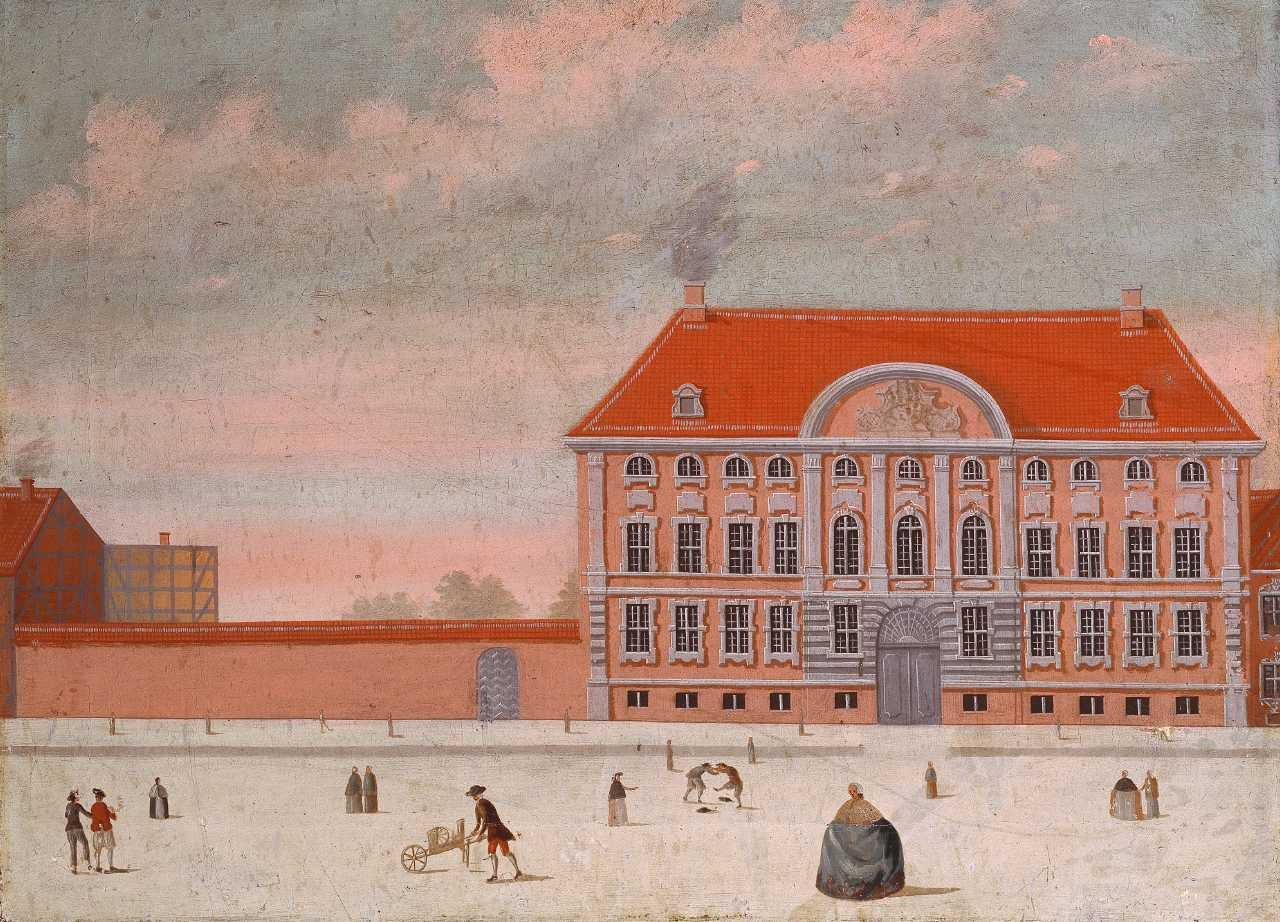
Count Laurvig's mansion in Store Kongensgade painted by Rach & Engborg in 1749

Ferdinand Anton Danneskiold-Laurvig was the son of Ulrik Frederik Gyldenløve. When his father died in 1704 he inherited Gyldenløve's Little Mansion at the corner of Dronningens Tværgade and Bredgade as well as the County of Laurvig in Norway. He purchased a number of smaller lots in Store Kongensgade in the 1720s. It is unclear when the building at Store Kongensgade was built. Most sources state that it was most likely built to a design by Johann Adam Soherr in circa 1745. Ida Haugsted states that it was more likely built in circa 1720-30 to designs by Johan Cornelius Krieger. Krieger was also responsible for adapting the Gyldenløbe Mansion. A garden connected the two buildings and the new building in Store Kongensgade was referred to as Danneskiold-Laurvig's backyard" (Danneskiold-Laurvig's baggård). The new building was also known as Jernmagasinet ("The Iron Store") since stoves and other products from Danneskiold-Laurvig's extensive Fritzøe ironworks in Laurvig in Norway were sold from its ground floor.

Frederik Ludvig Danneskiold-Laurvig succeeded his father in 1754. He died without children in 1762 and all his holdings were therefore transferred to his brother Christian Conrad Danneskiold-Laurvig (1723-1783).

=== Frédéric de Coninck and Niels Lunde Reiersen ===
The building was on 3 April 1783 sold to the merchants Frédéric de Coninck and Niels Lunde Reiersen for 46,000 rigsdaler.

The building was home to 18 residents in three households at the 1787 census. Bookkeeper Thomas Christopher Radigend (76 yrs.) resided in the ground-floor apartment with his second wife Anne (72 yrs.), his sister's unmarried daughter Dorthea Helena (64 yrs.) and two maids. Counter Admiral Andreas Georg Herman Schultz (1718-1798) and his wife Anne Margrethe True (1737-1825) lived in the large first-floor apartment with the 18-year-old girl Charlotte Lindemann (1767-1837), one male servant and two maids. The 40-year-old clerk Jørn Bøttger and his 28-year-old wife Christiane resided in the more humble second-floor apartment with their three children, a 27-year-old maid and the property's caretaker Lars Larsen.

=== Zinn ===
Reiersen sold his share of the building complex in Bredgade-Store Kongensgade to Frédéric de Coninck in 1789. Later that same year Frédéric de Coninck sold the Danneskiold-Laurvig Mansion to wine merchant Johan Ludwig Friederich Zinn. He was a nephew of Johann Ludvig Zinn with whom he stayed in the Zinn House at the time of the 1787 census. Zinn adapted the building. His alterations included a conversion of the former shop premises into an extra ground-floor apartment.

=== Changing owners, 1810–1829 ===
Zinn ended up returning to Neuendorff in Germany. In 1810, he sold his property in Store Kongensgade to the wholesale merchants David Amsel Meyer and Meyer Seligman Trier. In 1811, they sold it to the heirs of stamhuset Giesegaard Knud Schack Bille (1773-1821). In 1816, it was acquired by the English grocers Alexander Watt & Gordon (based Vestergade Matr. 21). They also purchased the country house Neptunus in Tårbæk.

=== Joseph Owen, 1829–1864 ===
In 1829, Watt & Gordon sold the property to Joseph Owen (1789-1862). In 1825, he had joined Ryberg & Co.

Owen's property was home to four households at the 1834 census.

Owen resided in the first-floor apartment with his wife Susannah Christine von Pahlen (1794-1884), their seven children, (aged two to 17), two clerks and six servants. Frederik August Esbensen (1802-), a clerk in Rentekammeret, resided in one of the grou nd-floor apartments with his wife Anna Christine, their little son and two maids. Robert Kierm a wholesale merchant (grosserer), resided in the other ground-floor apartment with his housekeeper Anne Jensen. Jean Frederik de Coninck, another wholesale merchant and Belgian consul (son of Jean de Coninck and Christiane Reiersen), resided in the second-floor apartment with his wife Marie, their five children and three servants.

=== Later history ===
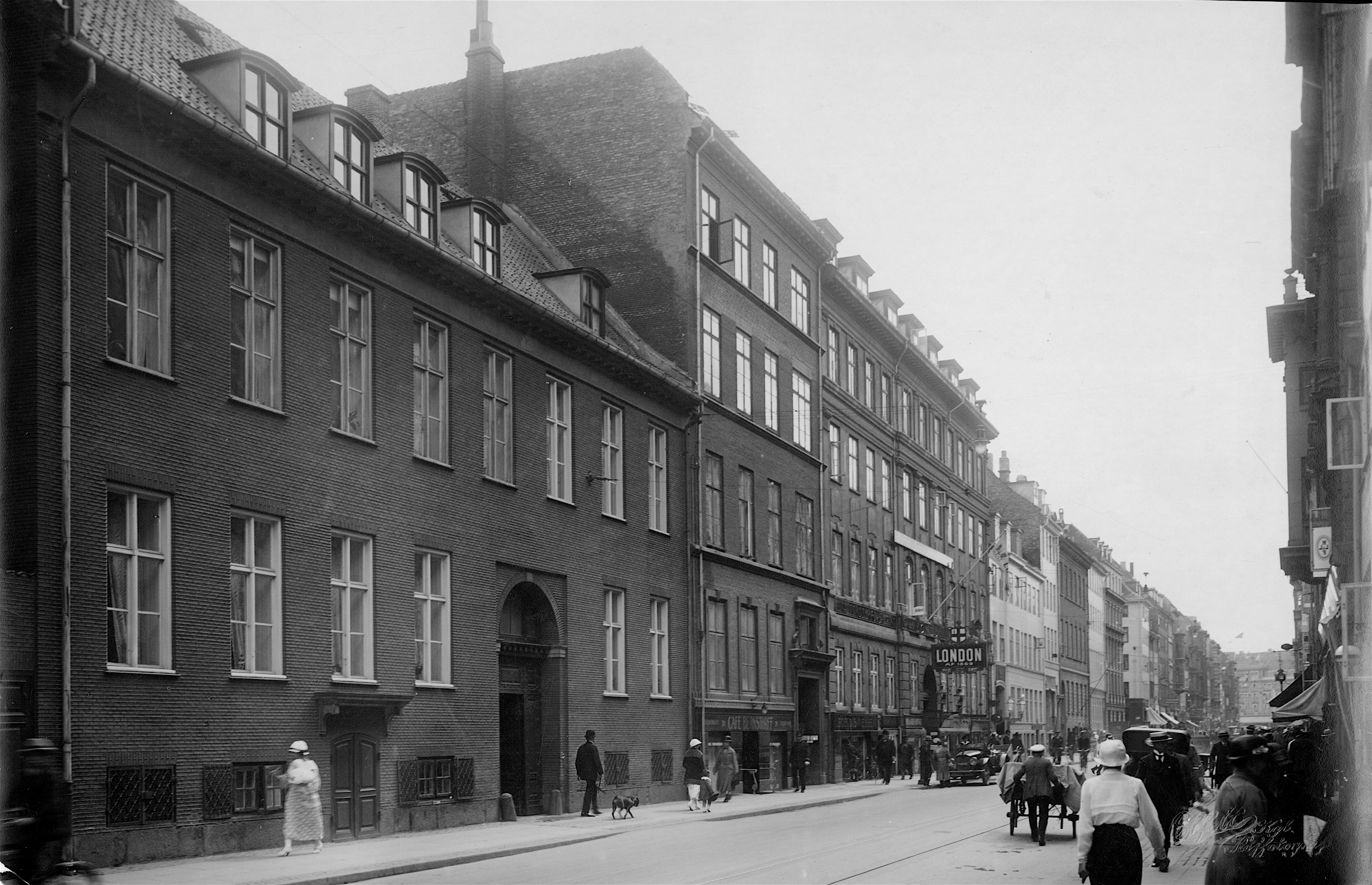
The building photographed by Peter Elfelt.

The property was later acquired by master carpenter Thorvald Jacob Schmock (1839-1896). He resided at H. C. Ørsteds vej 7 and did thus not himself live in the building. In 1882, he undertook a comprehensive adaption of the building complex. The main wing was heightened with one and a half storeys.

== Architecture ==
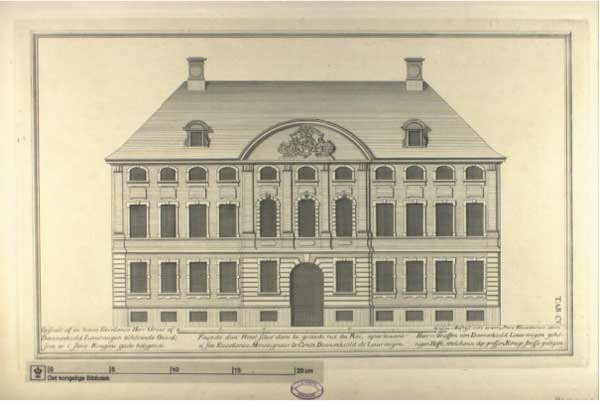
The building seen on an illustration from Lauritz de Thurah's Hafnia Hodierna (1748)

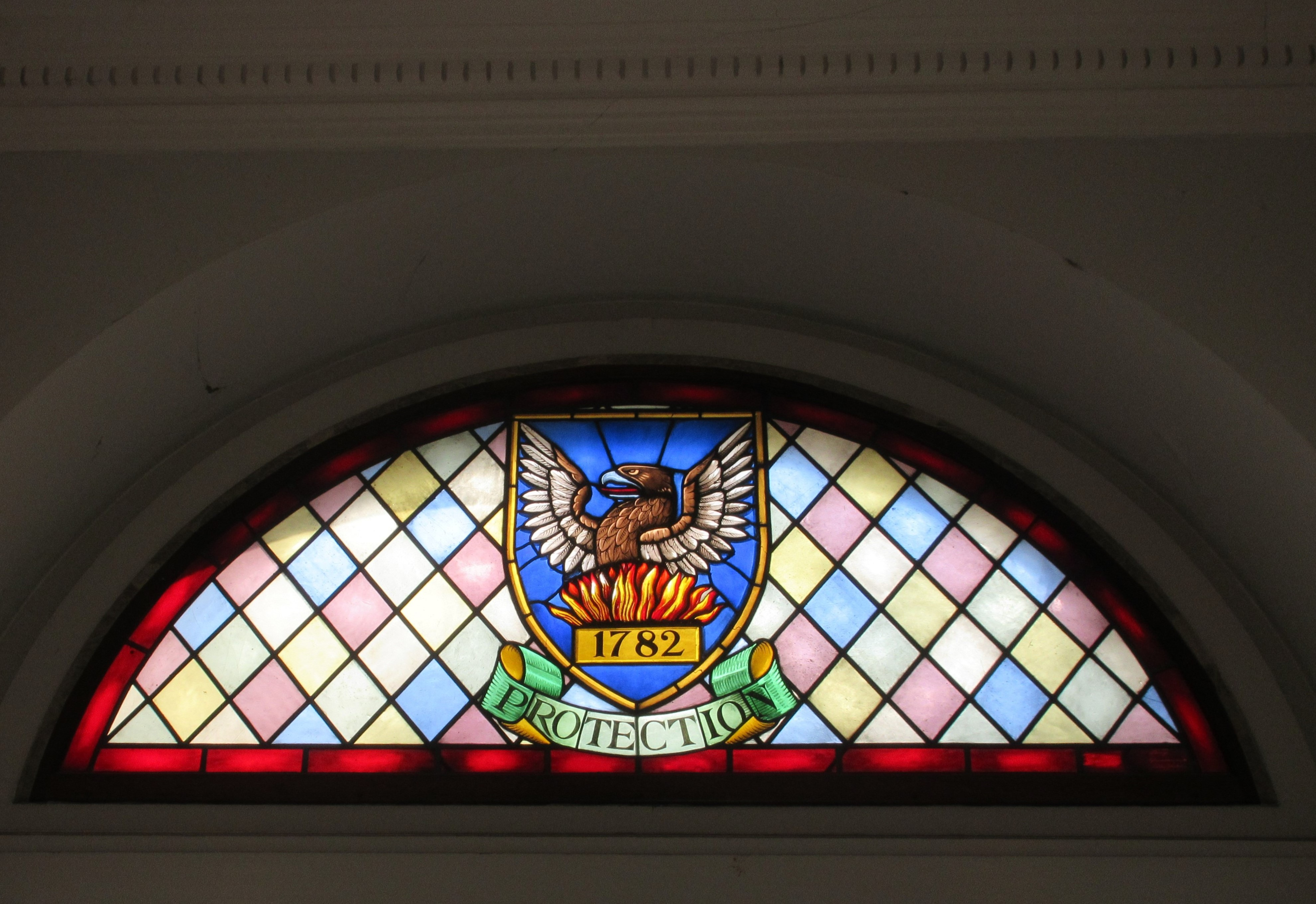
Glass mosaic above the gate, stating the year 1782

The Rococo-style mansion is 11 bays wide and has a median risalit decorated with pilasters. It was expanded with an extra floor sometime in the 19th century. It was listed on the Danish registry of protected buildings and places in 1954.

== List of owners ==
- (1704-1754) Ferdinand Anton Danneskiold-Laurvig
- (1754-1762) Frederik Ludvig Danneskiold-Laurvig
- (1762-1773) Creating Christian Conrad Danneskiold-Laurvig
- (1783-1789) Frédéric de Coninck and Niels Lunde Reiersen
- (1789-1799) Frédéric de Coninck
- (1799-1810) Johan Ludwig Friederich Zinn
- (1810-1811) Meyer& Trier
- (1811-1811) Moritz Meyer Leopold Breslau von Bressendorff
- (1811-1816) Knud Bille Schack
- (1816-1829) Watt & Gordon
- (1829-1868) Joseph Owen
