= Jomfruens Egede =

Manor house in Faxe Municipality, Denmark

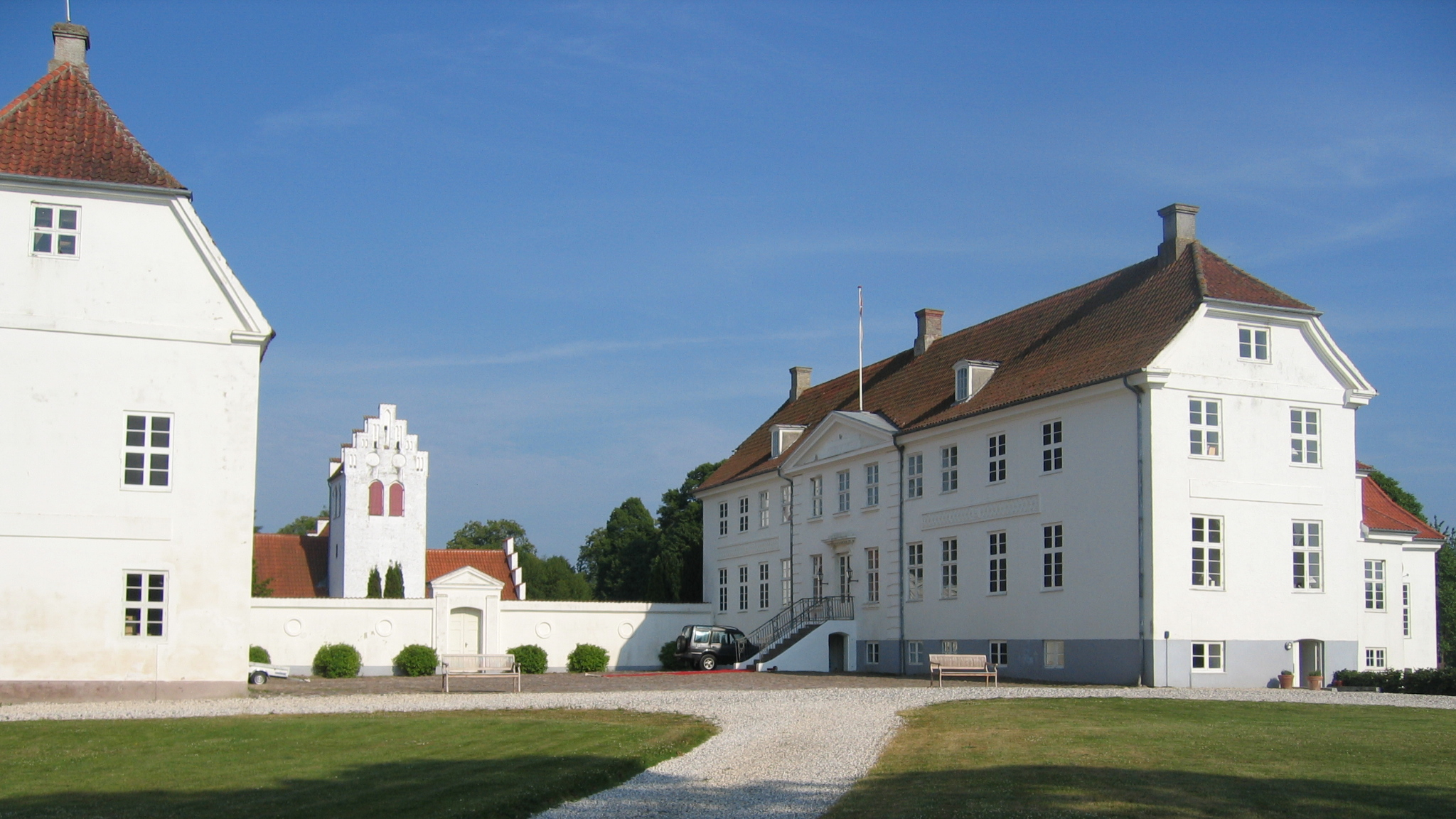
- Jomfruens Egede with Øster Egede Church in the background

General information
- Architectural style: Neoclassical
- Location: Faxe Municipality, Denmark
- Coordinates: 55°16′51.41″N 12°5′25.78″E
- Completed: Late 18th century
- Client: Sophie Amalie Moth (current building)

Design and construction
- Architect: Caspar Frederik Harsdorff

Jomfruens Egede is a manor house located three kilometres north-west of Faxe, a small town some 40 km south of Copenhagen, Denmark. It owes its current appearance to Sophie Amalie Moth who in the late 18th century altered it with the assistance of Caspar Frederik Harsdorff and Joseph Christian Lillie. The National Museum of Denmark has described it as possibly the finest example from the period.

== History ==
=== Early history ===
Jomfruens Egede traces its history back to 1346 when it was owned by Uffe Pedersen Neb, a loyal supporter of King Valdemar IV, and known as Egedegaard. Etymologically, Egede- derives from an old form 'large oak forest' while -gaard means 'farm' or 'manor'. Its name, which means 'Egede of the Lady' refers to two unmarried noble women, Ermegaard and Birgitte Bille, who in 1542 inherited the estate from their father.

=== Sophie Amalie Moth and the new house ===
In 1674 the estate was acquired by King Christian V's mistress, Sophie Amalie Moth, who received official recognition and was appointed Countess of Samsø on 31 December 1677. After Christian V's death in 1699 she retired to the estate where she led a quiet life until her own death in 1719. The property was then owned by their son, Ulrik Christian Gyldenløve, Count of Samsø.

After different owners Jomfruens Egede came to Niels Schack-Rathlou, whose son Christian Schack-Rathlou in the 1790s carried out an expansion and adapted the design of the house with the assistance of the architects Caspar Frederik Harsdorff and Joseph Christian Lillie.

In 1740, Jomfruens Egede was bought by Claus Benedix Beenfeldt who already owned nearby Lystrup Castle. Since that time the two estates have been under the same ownership.

=== Moltke era ===
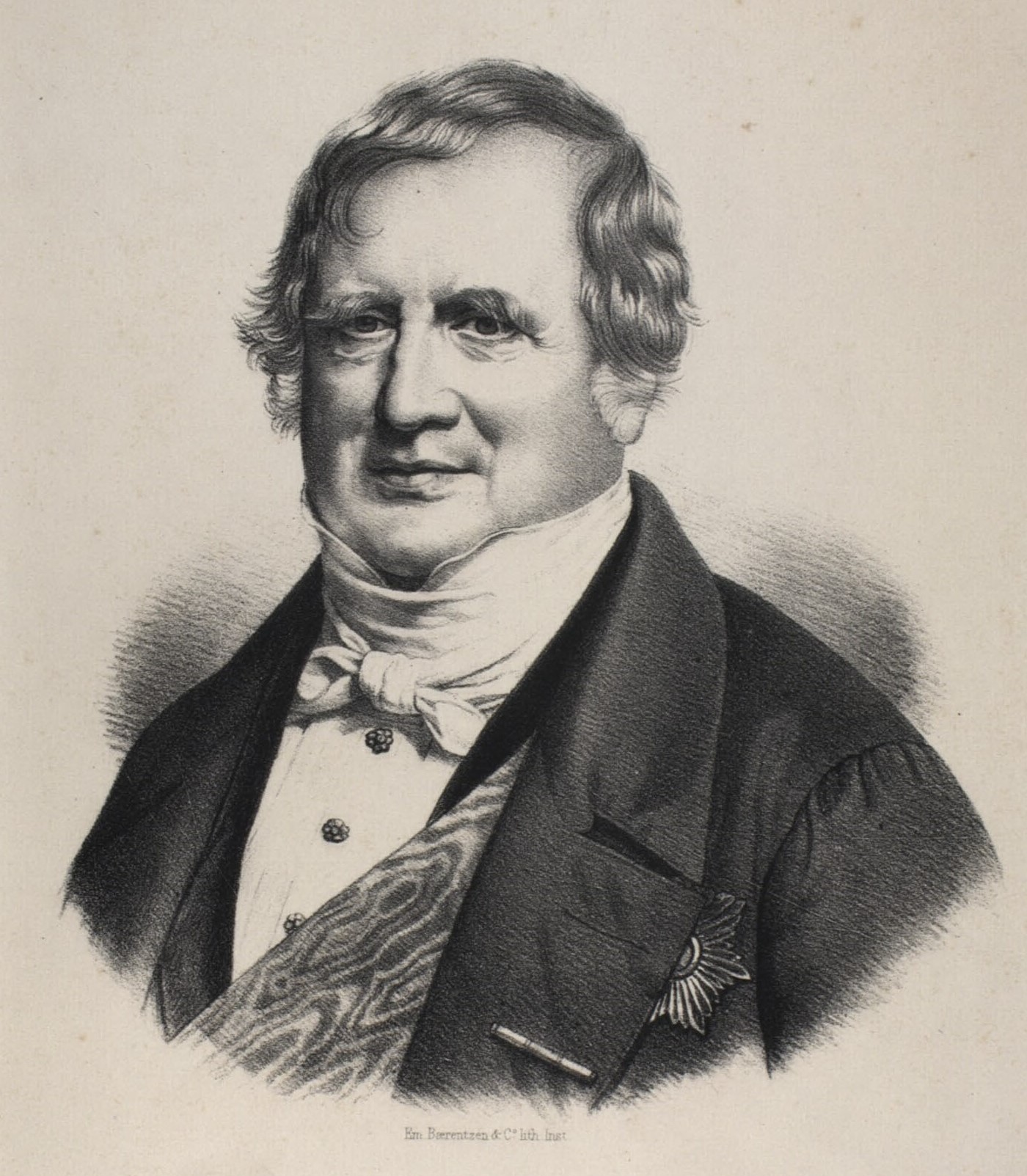
Adam Wilhelm Moltke

In 1931, the estate was bought by Count Adam Wilhelm Moltke, who had inherited Bregentved from his father in 1818, and would later become the first Danish Prime Minister after the adoption of the Constitution of Denmark in 1849. Moltke increased his holdings through several other acquisitions, acting as curator of Vallø and Vemmetofte and managing Knuthenborg for Count Frederik Marcus Knuth, the underage nephew of his wife. As a result, he administered one of the largest landholdings in the country at the time.

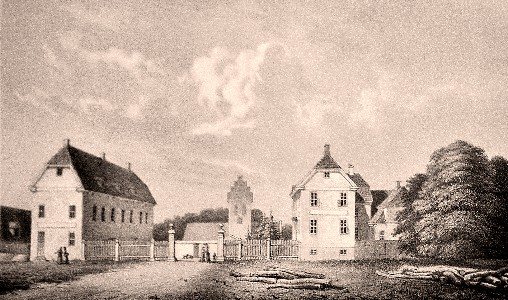
Jomfruens Egede in the late 19th century

When Christian Moltke inherited Lystrup and Jomfruens Egede from his father, he disrupted his diplomatic career which had brought him to both London and Vienna to concentrate on the management of his estates. Jomfruens Egede has remained in the possession of the Moltke family to this day.

== Architecture ==
Designed in the Neoclassical style, Jomfruens Egede consists of two parallel wings which to the south border on the churchyard of Østre Egede Church.

The house is particularly noted for its interiors, which the National Museum of Denmark has described as "possibly the finest example of Danish interior design and furnishings of the late 18th century".

== List of owners ==
- 1346–1350 Uffe Pedersen Neb
- 1350–1360 Peder Offesen Neb / Johannes Offesen Neb / Niels Offesen Neb
- 1360–1391 Peder Offesen Neb
- 1391–1399 Ingeborg Nielsdatter Panter
- 1399–1423 Anders Jacobsen Lunge
- 1423–1456 Eline Evertsdatter Moltke
- 1456–1465 Torbern Bille
- 1465–1503 Sidsel Ovesdatter Lunge
- 1503–1514 Bent Bille
- 1514–1542 Hans Bentsen Bille
- 1542–1548 Inger Corfitzdatter Rønnow
- 1548–1559 Bent Hansen Bille / Torben Hansen Bille
- 1559 Ermegaard Bentsdatter Bille / Birgitte Torbensdatter Bille / Hans Barnekow
- 1559–1587 Ermegaard Bentsdatter Bille / Birgitte Torbensdatter Bille / Mette Oxe
- 1587–1608 Ingeborg Andersdatter Bille
- 1608–1631 Tage Andersen Thott
- 1631–1632 Jens Sparre
- 1632–1640 Sidsel Nielsdatter Parsberg
- 1640–1658 Christian Sparre
- 1658–1662 Sidsel Kaas
- 1662–1674 Vincents Joachim Hahn
- 1674–1719 Sophie Amalie Moth, countess of Samsøe
- 1719 Ulrik Christian Gyldenløve, Count of Samsø
- 1719–1721 The estate of Ulrik Christian Gyldenløves
- 1721–1735 Nicolas Esben Poulsen
- 1735–1740 Nicolas Esben Poulsen's widow
- 1740–1751 Claus Benedix Beenfeldt
- 1751–1773 Thomas Holmsted Hjelmskiold
- 1773–1776 Christine Ulrikke Beenfeldt
- 1776–1782 Niels Rosenkrantz von Holstein-Rathlou
- 1782–1786 Christine Ulrikke Beenfeldt
- 1786–1828 Christian Frederik von Holstein-Rathlou
- 1828–1831 Christiane Elisabeth Friis
- 1831–1857 Adam Wilhelm Moltke
- 1857–1918 Christian Henrik Carl Moltke
- 1918–1943 Aage Vilhelm Christian Moltke
- 1943–1957 Ivar Christian Eiler Moltke
- 1957–1990 Norman Ivar Frederik Moltke
- 1990–present Joachim Godske Norman Moltke
