= Christian Ulrik Gyldenløve =

Danish diplomat and military officer (1611–1640)

Christian Ulrik Gyldenløve (3 February 1611 – 6 October 1640) was a Danish diplomat and military officer. He was one of three acknowledged illegitimate sons of Christian IV of Denmark — his only child with Kirsten Madsdatter. He died in a fight with troops from the Netherlands at the churchyard of Meinerzhagen and was buried in Wesel.

== See also ==
- Gyldenløve
