= Canute Porse the Elder =

Danish noble

- Duke of Samsø; Duke of Halland; Duke of Estonia; Count of Kalundborg
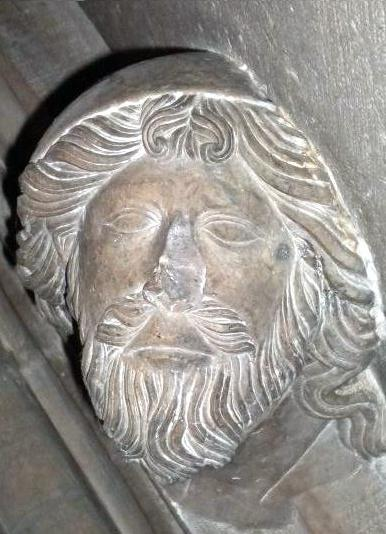
- Born: c. 1282
- Died: 30 May 1330; Copenhagen
- Noble family: Porse
- Spouse: Ingeborg Haakonsdatter
- Issue: Haakon Knudsen Porse, Duke of Halland; Knud Knudsen Porse, Duke of Halland
- Father: Peder Knudsen Porse

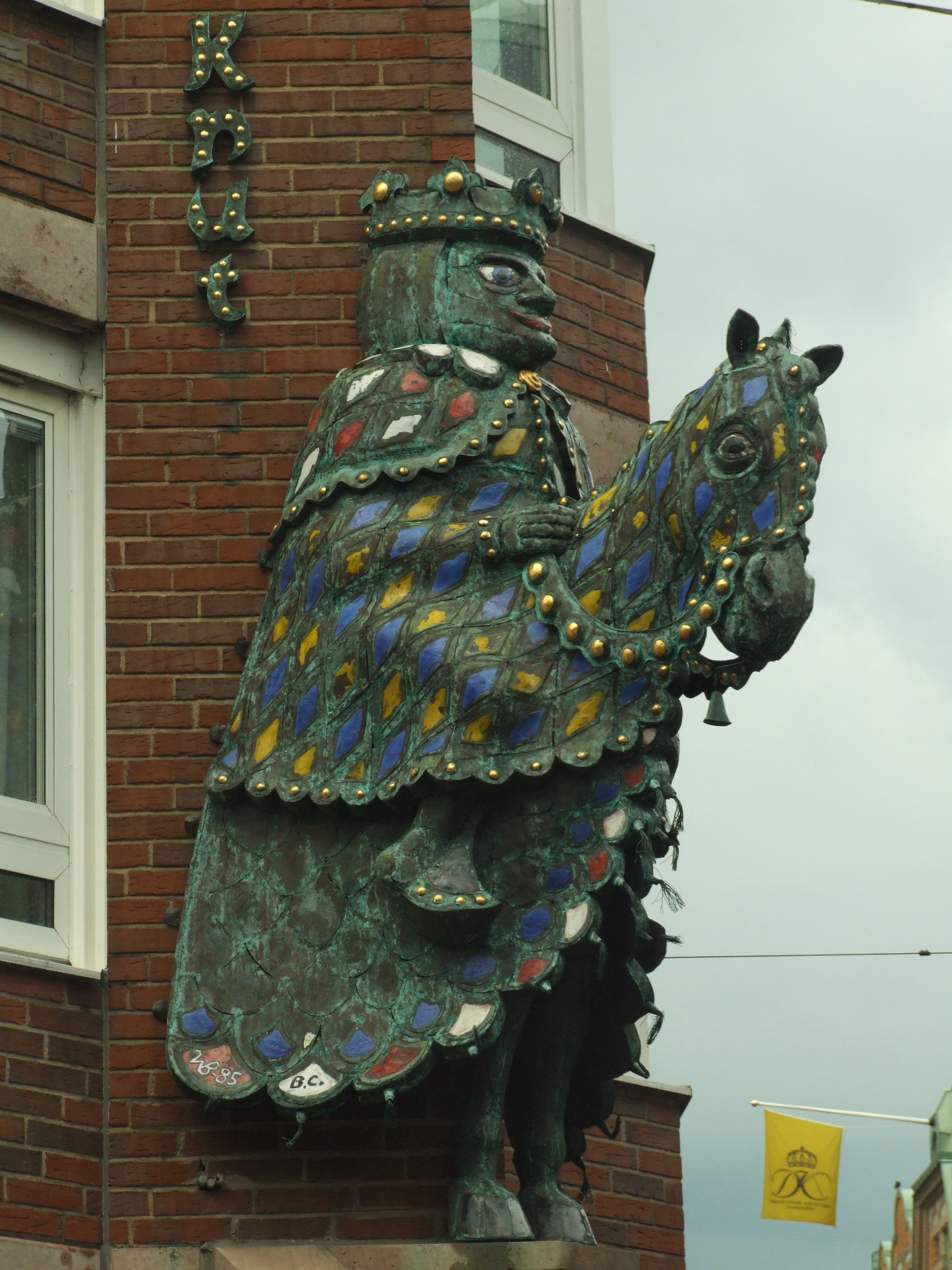
Fantasy sculpture representing Duke Canute in Halland's capital of Halmstad

Canute Porse the Elder or Knud/Knut Porse (died 30 May 1330) was a medieval Danish nobleman and Duke of Samsø, Duke of Halland, Duke of Estonia, and Count of Kalundborg.

== Biography ==
Porse was the son of Peder Porse, who was one of several Danish nobleman involved in the assassination of King Eric V of Denmark and thus was exiled since 1286 with his family.

On 21 June 1327, Porse married Norwegian princess Ingeborg (1301–1361), daughter of King Haakon V of Norway (1270–1319). She was also Duchess of Södermanland by her first marriage to Swedish prince Eric Magnusson, Duke of Södermanland (1282–1318). Through her first marriage, she was the mother of King Magnus (IV & VII) of Sweden and Norway (1316–1374) and of Euphemia of Sweden (1317–1370) wife of Albert II, Duke of Mecklenburg. This made him the step-father of the King of Norway-Sweden.

Before marrying Duchess Ingeborg, Porse had led the troops that put a military end to the reign of her brother-in-law King Birger in 1318. In 1322, without the approval of the Swedish government, he had joined forces with her to invade and try to conquer Scania (then in Denmark), which failed and caused trouble for them with that government. In the next year Ingeborg's valuable dowry of Axvall was besieged and in a peace settlement in 1326 (the year before she married Porse) she was given Dåvö in Munktorp instead.

Following his marriage to Ingeborg, Porse became duke of her extensive additional domains in Halland and Samsø. In 1329, her authority was extended to the Duchy of Estonia, but Canute Porse died the year after that. Porse and Ingeborg had two sons (below), who lost their Scanian hundreds of Bjäre and North Åsbo in 1341, but retained Halland till their deaths via the Black Death.

- Haakon Porse, Duke of Halland (died 1350)
- Canute Porse the Younger, Duke of Halland (died 1350)

== Succession ==
Preceded by Christopher I	Duke of South Halland; By right of his wife, Ingeborg of Norway; 1327-1330	Succeeded by Ingeborg of Norway, Canute II and Haakon I (as dukes of all Halland)
Preceded by Valdemar II	Duke of Estonia elected, with Ingeborg of Norway; 1329-1330	Succeeded by Ingeborg of Norway (alone)
