= Duke of Halland =

Scandinavian noble title

This lists those feudal magnates (counts, dukes, and other sort of princes) who have held Halland (Hallandia) as fief, or its southern or northern part, as a substantive title.

== Earl in Halland ==
- Charles Eriksen, maternal grandson of Canute IV of Denmark, son of Eric, Earl of Falster

== Count of Halland ==
- Knud Valdemarsen, joint king of Denmark from 1170, prince of Halland 1177–1182
- Niels I, Count of Halland, 1218 (died the same year), bastard son of Valdemar II of Denmark

== Count of Northern Halland ==
- Duke Skule of Norway, fiefholder of Northern Halland 1228–1240
- Niels II, Count of Northern Halland 1241–1251
- Jacob Nielsen, Count of Halland (northern) 1283–1305
- Duke Erik Magnusson, fiefholder of North Halland (seat in Varberg castle) 1310–1318

== Duke of Northern Halland ==
- Ingeborg of Norway, Duchess of North Halland 1312–1341 as Erik Magnusson's consort and widow
- Magnus Eriksson, fiefholder of North Halland in 1318, king 1319 of Sweden and Norway, and overlord of all of Terra Scania from 1332

== Duke of Southern Halland ==
- Erik Knudsen, illegitimate grandson of Valdemar II of Denmark, Duke of Southern Halland 1284–1304
- Christopher, brother of Eric VI of Denmark, Duke of Southern Halland 1307–1326
- Canute Porse, second consort of Duchess Ingeborg (above), Duke of South Halland 1327–1330

== Duke of Halland ==
- Ingeborg of Norway, Duchess now of all of Halland 1327–1341 as consort and widow (for South Halland's part) of Canute
- Canute Porse Jr., Duke of Halland 1330–1350 holding the title simultaneously with his mother Ingeborg (above) and brother Hacon (below)
- Haakon Porse, Duke of Halland 1330–1350 holding the title simultaneously with his mother Ingeborg and brother Canute (above)
- Ingeborg of Norway (above), Duchess of Halland 1341–1353 in her own right
- Bengt Algotsson, Duke of Halland and Finland c. 1353 – 1357

== Titular dukes and duchesses ==
The title of duke was revived in Sweden in 1772, after which members of the royal family have been granted titular duchies named after Sweden's historical provinces.

- Prince Bertil, Duke of Halland 1912–1997
- Princess Lilian, Duchess of Halland 1976–2013, prince Bertil's consort and widow
- Prince Julian, Duke of Halland 2021–present

== Coat of arms ==
The first known coat of arms of Halland consisted of a crowned heraldic leopard over 10 hearts and was used by Niels II and James I and most likely also by Niels I although no examples are preserved from the latter's reign. The colours of this first symbol are uncertain. In 1305, James used a seal showing a lion and 20 hearts. Knud Porse used his family's arms depicting three red sea leaves in a gold shield. One of the seals used by Duchess Ingeborg of Sweden, Halland, and Samsø represents Halland by an arms party per fess, with an unspecified colour in chief and a leopard in the larger lower base. This seal dates from 1336, and the figure was repeated in her seal used 1340–1352. A fresco in Søborg Castle, Denmark, dates from her stay there 1331–36 and shows the arms of Halland as a crowned upstanding silver lion on blue. This insignia Azure, a lion rampant Argent crowned Argent is closely related to the current arms of the province although the current lion is no longer crowned but has two tails.

From 1449 to 1972 a modified version Halland's first arms was represented in the coat of arms of Denmark now symbolizing the monarch's title King of the Goths. This title referred to the possession of the island Gotland. Occasionally, Gotland was represented in the Danish arms with an additional arms as well, an Agnus Dei.

Duke Benedict's personal escutcheon, from his family, depicted a lion of the Bjälbo dynasty.
