= Sophie Amalie Moth =

17th and 18th-century Danish noblewoman

- Countess of Samsøe
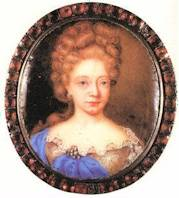
- Sophie Amalie Moth, Countess of Samsøe

Landgravine of Samsø
- Reign: 1677 – 1698
- Born: 28 March 1654
- Died: 17 January 1719 (aged 64); Jomfruens Egede manor house, Zealand, Denmark
- Family: Moth
- Issue: Christiane Gyldenløve; Christian Gyldenløve; Sophie Christiane Gyldenløve; Anna Christiane Gyldenløve; Ulrik Christian Gyldenløve
- Father: Poul Moth
- Mother: Ida Dorothea Bureneus
- Occupation: Royal mistress to Christian V of Denmark

Sophie Amalie Moth, Countess of Samsøe (28 March 1654 – 17 January 1719) was a Danish noblewoman and the officially acknowledged royal mistress of King Christian V of Denmark. Together they had six acknowledged illegitimate children, all of whom bore the surname Gyldenløve. In 1677, she was elevated to be the first Landgrave of Samsø. The still-existing Danish noble family of Danneskiold-Samsøe is descended from her. Sophie Amalie Moth was the first officially acknowledged royal mistress in the history of Denmark.

== Biography ==
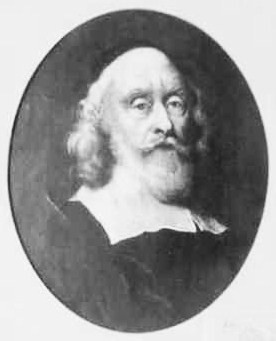
Her father, Dr. Poul Moth, personal physician of the King of Denmark and Norway

Sophie Amalie was born on 28 March 1654 as the daughter of Poul Moth (1601–1670), doctor of the royal court, and Ida Dorothea Bureneus (1624–1684).

The relationship with the monarch was more or less arranged by her mother and started in 1671 or 1672. Sophie bore Christian six children, each of whom he acknowledged publicly. Consistent with the practice of his father and grandfather, all were given the surname Gyldenløve.

In 1677 Sophie Amalie was given the title Countess of Samsø, a title which chancellor Peder Griffenfeld had been deprived of after falling from favor. The relationship was known within the royal court from the start, but it was not official until she was given her title and officially presented at court.

In 1679, her children were acknowledged; in 1685, they were officially introduced at court.

Moth lived quite discreetly and did not have any political influence; the only times that she used her influence were when she secured a few favours from the monarch for some of her relatives. Her brother Matthias Moth, in particular, used the connection to his advantage. In 1682, she was granted estates in Gottorp.

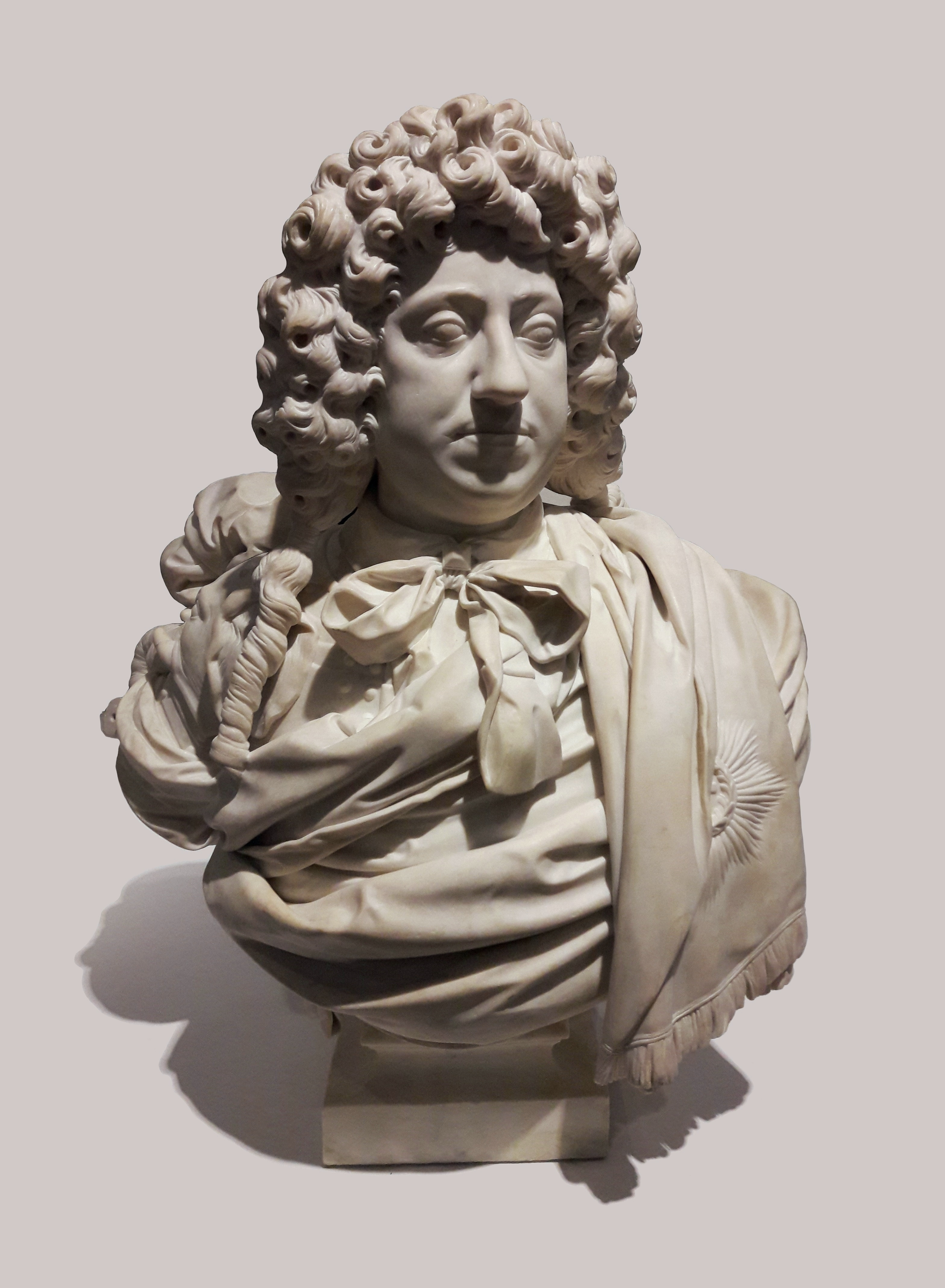
Marble bust of Christian V of Denmark by Christian Nerger, 1680s, National Museum in Warsaw

After Niels Juel's death in 1697, the king arranged for her to take over his mansion, today known as the Thott Palace, after a later owner, and housing the French Embassy in Copenhagen. Two years later, Christian died and Sophie lived a quiet life on her estate until her death in 1719, twenty years later. Christian Gyldenløve, their oldest son, took over the mansion after her.

== Children ==
Sophie Amalie's six acknowledged illegitimate children by Christian V were:

Name	Birth	Death
Christiane Gyldenløve	7 July 1672	12 September 1689
Christian Gyldenløve	28 February 1674	16 July 1703
Sophie Christiane Gyldenløve	1675	18 August 1684
Anna Christiane Gyldenløve	1676	11 August 1689
Ulrik Christian Gyldenløve	24 June 1678	8 December 1719
Daughter	1682	8 July 1684

== Sources ==
- Sophie Amalie Moth in Dansk Biografisk Leksikon 1. ed. (in Danish)
- Sophie Amalie Moth (1654 - 1719) at Dansk Kvindebiografisk Leksikon (in Danish)
