= Countship of Larvik =

Norwegian noble title

The Countship of Larvik or Landgraviate of Larvik (also spelt Laurvig or Laurvigen) was created on 29 September 1671 when Brunla amt was made into the county of Laurvigen. It covered today's Larvik Municipality plus parts of Færder Municipality (Tjøme) and Sandefjord Municipality (Sandar and Kodal).

The county was created by king Christian V for general and Statholder (viceroy) of Norway, Ulrik Frederik Gyldenløve, illegitimate son of king Frederik III.

Laurvig was intended to be the leading countship in Denmark-Norway: "hvilket Grevskab skal for vores Rigers første Grevskab herefter holdes og agtes skal." The count's estate comprised the former Brunla, Fritsø and Halsen estates and the Lange family's former estate. It also included the towns of Larvik and Sandefjord, and significant industry: Fritzøe Ironworks and Fritzøe sawmill. Most of the count's properties are today owned by the Treschow family.

Gyldenløve built a manor named Herregården in what was then the outskirts of the town of Larvik. The building was started in 1674 and completed in time for Gyldenløve's third wedding, with Antoinette Augusta von Aldenburg, on August 16, 1677.

After Norway's brief independence and thereafter the formation of the Union between Sweden and Norway in 1814, the countship of Larvik remained a Danish property until 1817, as a result of a protocol of the Treaty of Kiel. In 1817, the countship was bought by local merchants from the Danish crown as a result of increasing local unrest and resistance to Danish rule, resulting in the countship joining the rest of the Union. In 1821, the county was merged with Jarlsberg county to become Jarlsberg and Larviks amt.

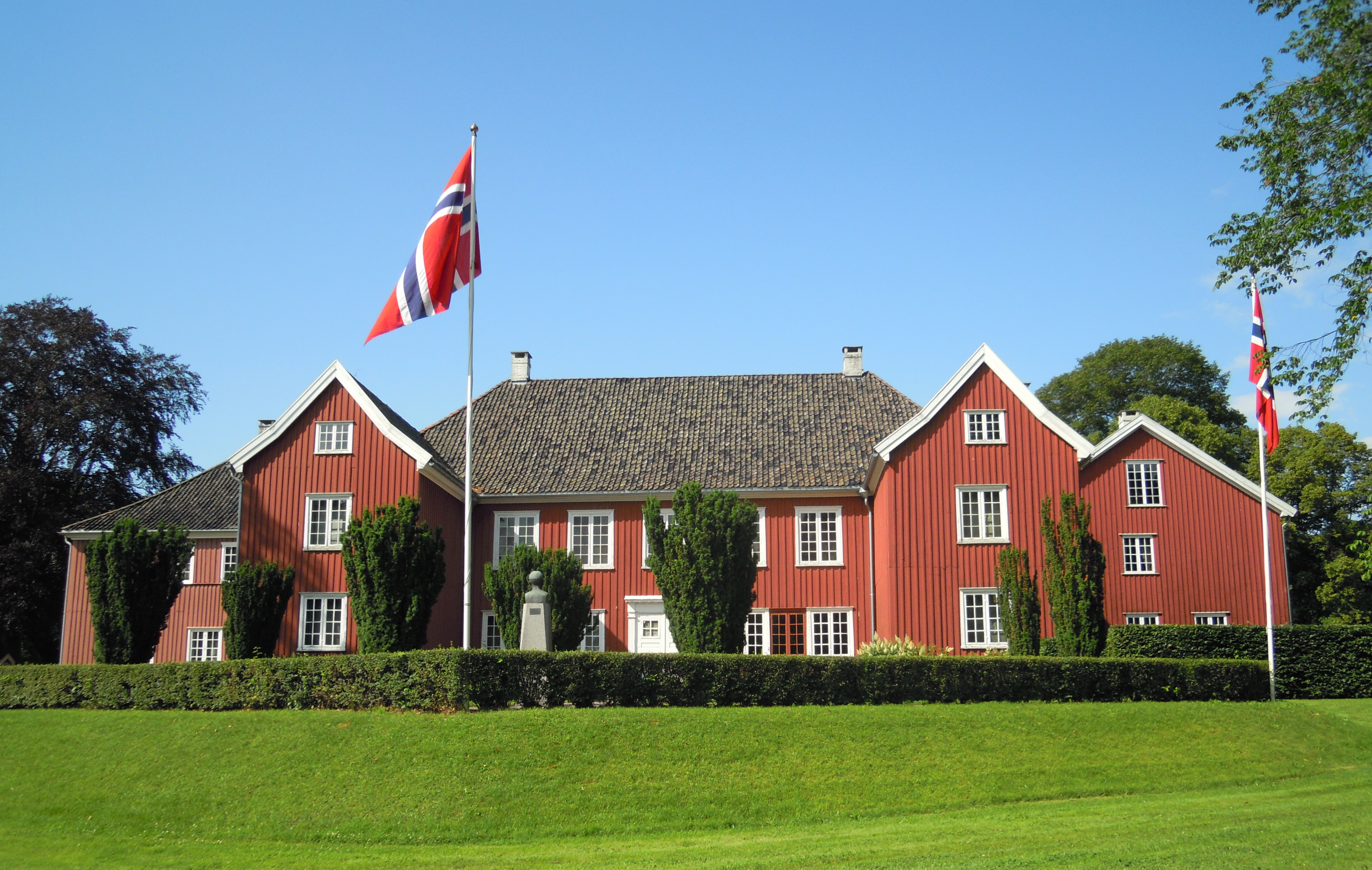
Herregården in LarvikFoto: Arnstein Rønning

The coat of arms is blazoned as follows: "I blåt en oprejst, kronet hvidspættet løve med hovedet set for fra ("leopard") i en krum gul hellebard. Om skjoldet to grønne palmegrene med blå sløjfe, og på skjoldet en grevekrone."

== House of Gyldenløve ==
Gyldenløve was naturalised in 1655. In 1671 he received the title Count of Larvik, but he never used it. The titles could be inherited by both his male and female descendants after a further determination of succession. By patent of 11 February 1692, succession was changed, so that only Gyldenløve's sons and their male descendants could inherit.

Coat of arms blazoned: "Et hvidt kors mellem 1. og 4. se grevskabet Laurvig, 2. og 3. sinister skrådelt af hvidt over gult og omvendt, 1 grevekronet rødt midterskjold to gående, kronede gule løver bag et hvidt kors. På skjoldet en grevekrone og en gul "leopard" som holder 2 x 3 Danneborgsfaner. To hvide elefanter.".

"A cross argent between, 1st and 4th quarters, for the county of Laurvig, 2nd and 3rd quarters a bend sinister of argent and Or counterchanged, over all a count's coronet gules ..."

- 1671–1704 Count Ulrik Fredrik Gyldenløve

== House of Danneskiold-Laurvig ==
Patent 1695 for Ulrik Frederik Gyldenløve's children with Countess Antoinette Augusta of Aldenburg, in the name Danneskiold-Laurvig.

Coat of arms blazoned: "Som Gyldenløve, ovenfor, dog med følgende forskelle: midterskjoldet ikke kronet og løverne foran korset; et kronet hjerteskjold med et kronet gult F3 i rødt; på hovedskjoldet en "antik" krone; løven øverst med antik krone; dekster elefant erstattet af gul løve med hjelm med antik krone og hvide hejrefjer.".

- 1704–1754 Count Ferdinand Anton Danneskiold-Laurvig
- 1754–1762 Count Frederik Ludvig Danneskiold-Laurvig
- 1762–1783 Count Christian Conrad Danneskiold-Laurvig

== House of Ahlefeldt-Laurvig ==
Granted in 1785 by the Supreme Court to major general Christian Ahlefeldt (1732-1791), count of Langeland with name Ahlefeldt-Laurvigen. He was the son-in-law of one of Gyldenløve's daughters. In 1805, his son Count Frederik Ahlefeldt-Laurvig sold the county of Laurvig together with Fritzø Ironworks to the king. The family continued to use the name Ahlefeldt-Laurvig or Ahlefeldt-Laurvigen. The king sold the county again by royal resolution of August 26, 1817.

Coat of arms blazoned: "Hvidt kors mellem 1. og 4. grevskabet Laurvig, 2. og 3. lodret delt af grevskabet Langeland og gult, hvori to røde fisk mellem tolv sorte græske kors. Grevekronet midterskjold, se Ahlefeldt. Hjelmfigurer: grevekrone; gul ørn; Danneskiold-Laurvig og Ahlefeldt. Skjoldholdere: se Danneskiold-Laurvig."

- 1785–1791 Count Christian Ahlefeldt-Laurvig
- 1791–1805 Count Frederik Ahlefeldt-Laurvig

== House of Ahlefeldt-Laurvig-Bille ==
Patent 1883 for count J. L. Ahlefeldt-Laurvigen with name Ahlefeldt-Laurvig-Bille.

Coat of arms: "Hvidt kors mellem, 1. og 4. Bille, 2. og 3. grevskaberne Laurvig og Langeland; grevekronet midterskjold: se Ahlefeldt. Hjelmfigurer: grevekrone; Danneskiold-Laurvig, Ahlefeldt og Bille. Skjoldholdere: se Danneskiold-Laurvig og Bille."

== House of Ahlefeldt-Laurvig-Lehn ==
Patent 1905 for count F. L. V. Ahlefeldt-Laurvig and his oldest son with name Ahlefeldt-Laurvig-Lehn. F. L. V. Ahlefeldt-Laurvig's wife, Anna Rosenørn-Lehn, was the heiress to the Barony of Lehn.

Coat of arms: "Hvidt kors mellem 1. Grevskabet Laurvig, 2. og 3. Lehn, 4. Grevskabet Langeland; midterskjold: Ahlefeldt, Danneskiold-Laurvig og Lehn."

== See also ==
- Jarlsberg - the other countship in Norway
