= Christian Gyldenløve =

Danish nobleman and military officer

- Landgrave of Samsøe
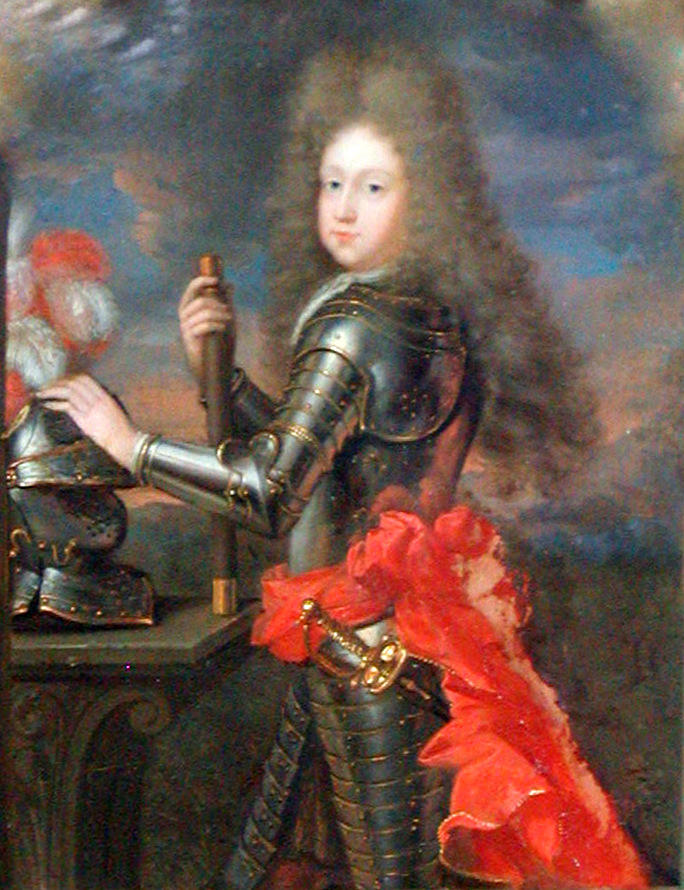
- Portrait in Frederiksborg Palace
- Other titles: County Governor of Bergenhus stiftamt (1681–1699); Commanding officer of The infantry regiment 'Youl Danois' (under his leadership called the "Royal Danois") (1692–1694); Lieutenant General of the Cavalry and The Infantry of Norway (1695–1701); General of the Cavalry and The Infantry of Norway (1696-); Supreme Commander of the militia in Norway (1697–1699); Field Marshal Lieutenant (1697-); Field Marshal (1699-); General Field Marshal Lieutenant (1701–1703); Commander-in-Chief of the Danish-Norwegian auxiliary corps (1701–1703); Imperial Generalfeldmarschall (1702–1703); Lord Chamberlain of Denmark (1696–1703)
- Born: 28 February 1674; Copenhagen, Denmark
- Died: 16 July 1703 (aged 29); Odense, Denmark
- Buried: St. Peter's Church, Copenhagen, Denmark
- Noble family: Danneskiold-Samsøe
- Father: Christian V of Denmark
- Mother: Sophie Amalie Moth

Christian Gyldenløve, Landgrave of Samsøe (Copenhagen, 28 February 1674 – Odense, 16 July 1703), was a Danish nobleman and military officer. He was one of five illegitimate children fathered by Christian V of Denmark with Sophie Amalie Moth.

He distinguished himself in both foreign and Danish-Norwegian military service and established himself as the Danish Count Danneskiold-Samsøe, which descended from his second marriage.

In Copenhagen on 27 November 1696 Christian married firstly his first cousin Countess Charlotte Amalie Danneskiold-Laurvig (15 November 1682 – 7 December 1699), a daughter of Ulrik Frederik Gyldenløve, his father's half-brother. They had two daughters:

- Christiane Charlotte (Copenhagen, 7 July 1698 – Akershus, 5 October 1699)
- Frederikke Louise (Akershus, 2 October 1699 – Sønderborg, 2 December 1744), married on 21 July 1720 to her kinsman Christian August, Duke of Schleswig-Holstein-Sonderburg-Augustenburg

In Copenhagen on 25 May 1701 Christian married secondly Dorothea Krag (27 September 1675 – Gisselfeld, 10 October 1754). They had two sons:

- Christian, Lensgreve af Danneskiold-Samsøe (Verona, 1 August 1702 – Copenhagen, 17 February 1728)
- Frederik, Count of Danneskiold-Samsøe (Assendrup, 1 November 1703 – Aarhus, 18 July 1770)

After his death, his widow assumed his post of royal General Postmaster.

== Ancestry ==
Ancestors of Christian Gyldenløve

8. Christian IV of Denmark
4. Frederick III of Denmark
9. Anne Catherine of Brandenburg
2. Christian V of Denmark
10. George, Duke of Brunswick-Lüneburg
5. Sophie Amalie of Brunswick-Lüneburg
11. Landgravine Anne Eleonore of Hesse-Darmstadt
1. Christian Gyldenløve
12. Mathias Poulsen Moth
6. Poul Mathiassen Moth
13. Ingeborg Jørgensdatter
3. Sophie Amalie Moth
14. Rudolph Burenæus
7. Ida Dorothea Bureneus
15. Ida Rothfelsen

Government offices
Preceded by Hans Hansen Lillienskiold	County Governor of Bergenhus stiftamt 1681–1699	Succeeded by Christian Stockfleth
