= Kirsten Madsdatter =

Mistress of Christian IV of Denmark (died 1629)

Kirsten Madsdatter (died 1629) was King Christian IV of Denmark's lover, and the mother of one of his three acknowledged, illegitimate sons, Christian Ulrik Gyldenløve.

Kirsten Madsdatter was likely the daughter of Copenhagen's mayor Matthias Hansen, though this is unconfirmed. She was originally a chambermaid to Queen Anna Catherine. The relationship started before the death of the queen; their son was born in 1611. In 1612, the queen died. In 1612, Kirsten was married to Reinholt Hansen , who eventually took over as Mayor of Copenhagen after the death of Matthias Hansen. Meanwhile, the king found Karen Andersdatter who became his new mistress in 1613. Kirsten died in 1629.
