= Ulrik Christian Gyldenløve, Count of Samsø =

17th and 18th-century Danish nobleman and admiral

Ulrik Christian Gyldenløve
- Count of Samsø
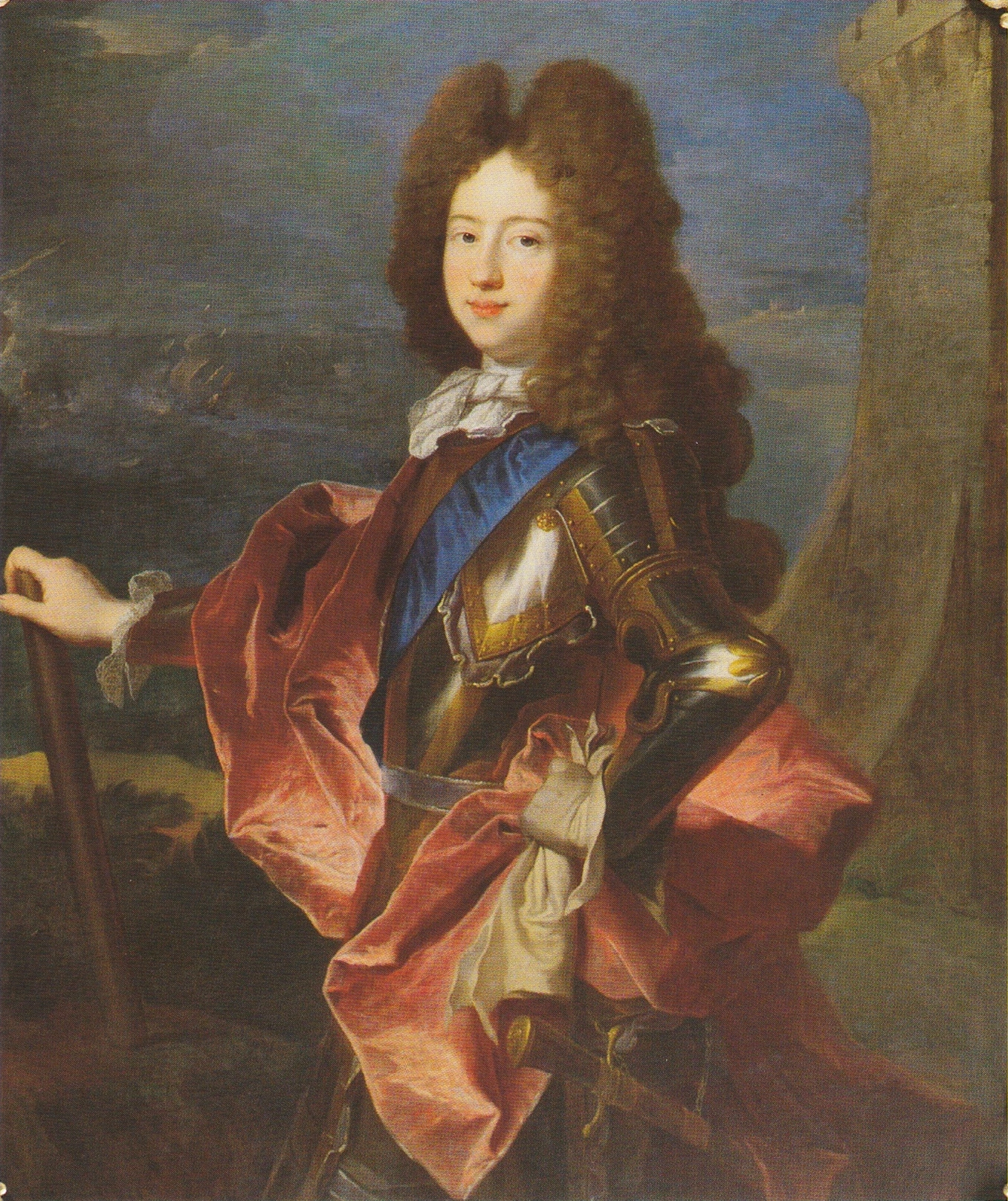
- Portrait of Gyldenløve by Hyacinthe Rigaud

Count of Samsøe
- Reign: 1698–1719
- Predecessor: Sophie Amalie Moth
- Successor: Christian Danneskiold-Samsøe
- Born: 24 June 1678; Brattingsborg, Samsø, Denmark
- Died: 8 December 1719 (aged 41); Køge Bay
- Buried: Brattingsborg, Samsø, Denmark
- Noble family: Danneskiold-Samsøe
- Father: Christian V of Denmark
- Mother: Sophie Amalie Moth
- Occupation: Admiral in the Royal Danish Navy; Governor of Iceland

Ulrik Christian Gyldenløve, Count of Samsø (1678 – December 1719) was a Danish Admiral in the Royal Danish-Norwegian Navy and Governor of Iceland. He was an acknowledged illegitimate son of King Christian V of Denmark and his officially acknowledged royal mistress Sophie Amalie Moth.

== Life ==
When Gyldenløve was 6 years old, his father appointed him Governor of Iceland, then a Denmark-Norway possession, a position that he held until his death, although he never visited the island.

Although Frederick IV of Denmark strongly distrusted nobility, his half-brother, Ulrik Christian Gyldenløve became Lieutenant General Admiral of the Danish-Norwegian Fleet in 1697, ultimately going on to become Commander-in-Chief of the Navy. He is also recognized as the founder of the Royal Danish Naval Academy.

By the outbreak of the Great Northern War General-Admiral Gyldenløve and the fleet were ready for the confrontation, but to no avail. The allied fleets of Sweden, England and the Dutch Republic sailed into the Øresund, and, since they severely outnumbered the Danish fleet (61 ships of the line against 21), prevented the Danish fleet from interdicting the Swedish troop transports. Under the cover of these combined fleets, Charles XII of Sweden put troops ashore and bombarded Copenhagen, thus ending the early Danish participation in the Great Northern War.

By 1709, when the war resumed, Gyldenløve had risen in the organization. Under his command, late in the autumn of 1712 the North Squadron joined with the Baltic fleet. Lord High Admiral Gyldenløve had gathered the fleet to support the siege of Stralsund. This fleet attacked the Swedish fleet while they were offloading transports on 29 September; Gyldenløve's fleet fired 80 transport ships, making it impossible for Sweden to relieve Stralsund. This represented a notable victory. The fleet played a continued role in the siege of Stralsund, ultimately resulting in the loss of the city and the flight of Charles XII to Sweden.

== Ancestry ==
Ancestors of Ulrik Christian Gyldenløve, Count of Samsø

16. Frederick II of Denmark
8. Christian IV of Denmark
17. Sophie of Mecklenburg-Güstrow
4. Frederick III of Denmark
18. Joachim Frederick, Margrave of Brandenburg
9. Anne Catherine of Brandenburg
19. Margravine Catherine of Brandenburg-Küstrin
2. Christian V of Denmark
20. William, Duke of Brunswick-Lüneburg
10. George, Duke of Brunswick-Lüneburg
21. Princess Dorothea of Denmark
5. Sophie Amalie of Brunswick-Lüneburg
22. Louis V, Landgrave of Hesse-Darmstadt
11. Landgravine Anne Eleonore of Hesse-Darmstadt
23. Margravine Magdalene of Brandenburg
1. Ulrik Christian Gyldenløve, Count of Samsø
24. Poul Mathiassen Moth
12. Mathias Poulsen Moth
25. Margrethe Volradsdatter Schröder
6. Poul Mathiassen Moth
13. Ingeborg Jørgensdatter
3. Sophie Amalie Moth
14. Rudolph Burenæus
7. Ida Dorothea Bureneus
15. Ida Rothfelsen

== Sources ==
- Admiral Thunderbolt, by Hans Christian Adamson, Chilton Company, 1959.
- Dansk biografisk Lexikon / VI. Bind, by Carl Frederik Bricka (1887–1905)
