= Ingeborg of Norway =

- Duchess of Södermanland, Halland, and Estonia
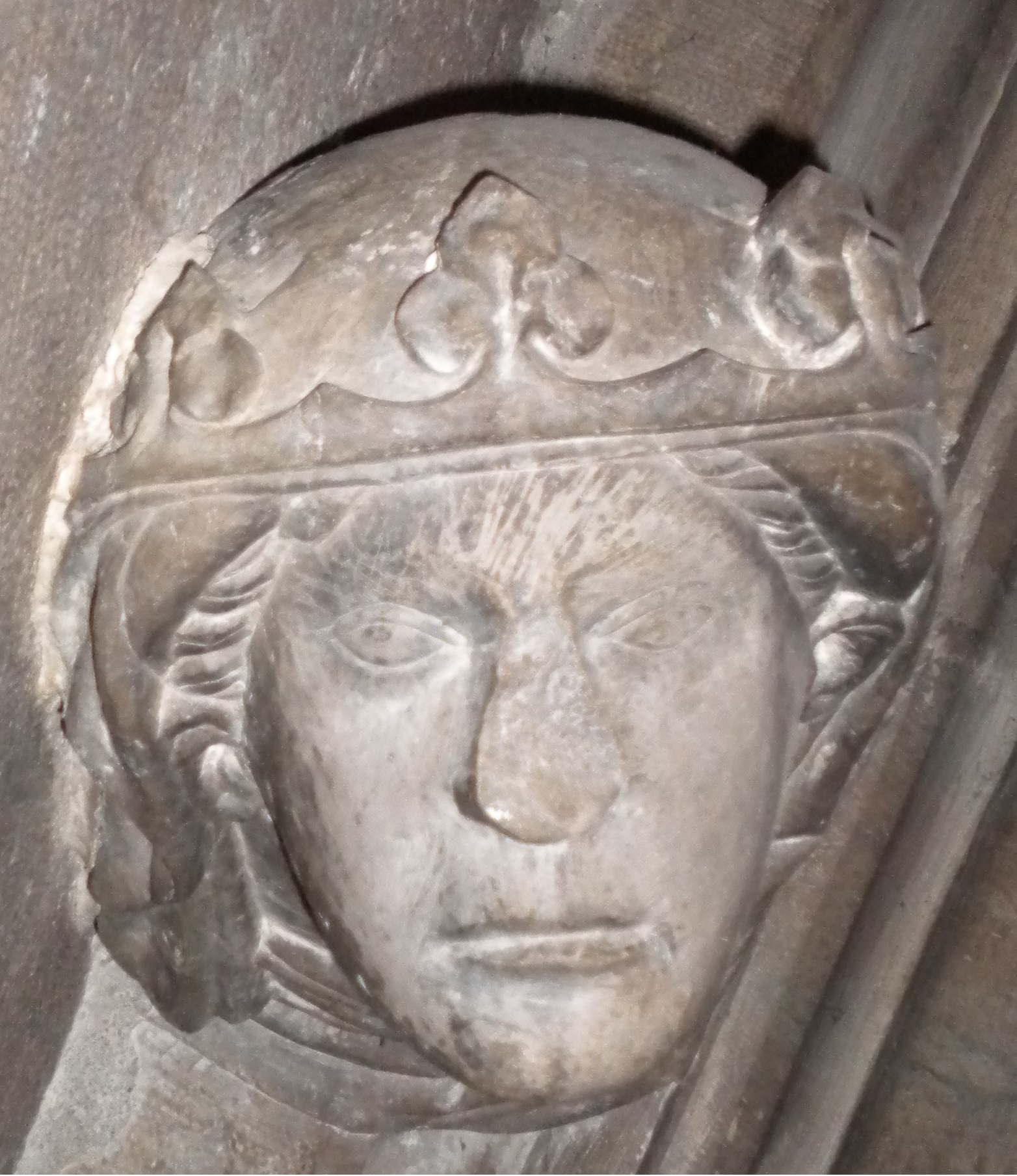
- Duchess Ingeborg's bust at Linköping Cathedral
- Born: 1301; Norway
- Died: 17 June 1361 (aged 59–60)
- Spouse: Erik Magnusson, Duke of Södermanland; Canute Porse, Duke of Halland
- Issue: Magnus, King of Sweden and Norway; Euphemia, Duchess of Mecklenburg; Haakon, Duke of Halland; Canute, Duke of Halland
- House: Sverre
- Father: Haakon V of Norway
- Mother: Euphemia of Rügen

Ingeborg of Norway (Old Norse: Ingibjörg Hákonardóttir; Swedish: Ingeborg Håkansdotter; Norwegian: Ingebjørg Håkonsdatter; 1301 – 17 June 1361) was a Norwegian princess and by marriage a Swedish royal duchess with a position in the regency governments in Norway (1319–1327) and Sweden (1319–1326) during the minority of her son, King Magnus Eriksson. In 1318–1319, she was Sweden's de facto ruler, and from 1319 until 1326, she was Sweden's first de jure female regent. Her role in northern European history is considered of major importance.

During Magnus's minority, Ingeborg played a prominent political role in both kingdoms and participated in their minority governments. Swedish biographical scholarship has described her as head of the minority government and a member of both the Swedish and Norwegian councils, while Norwegian scholarship notes that she participated in the government without holding a formal position in the Norwegian royal administration.

== Life ==
=== Early life ===
Ingeborg was born in 1301 as the only legitimate daughter of King Håkon V of Norway from his marriage with Euphemia of Rügen. After her birth, King Håkon altered the order of succession so that she or her future son could inherit the throne, which made her marriage of a matter of prime political importance.

At one year of age, she was betrothed to the twenty-year-old Duke Erik, brother of King Birger of Sweden. In 1308, the political situation changed and she was instead betrothed to Magnus, King Birger's heir. The situation soon changed again, and the marriage pact with Duke Erik was restored.

In 1312, Ingeborg and Erik were formally married in a double wedding in Oslo; at the same time, her namesake cousin Ingeborg married Erik's brother duke Valdemar Magnusson. At her wedding, her mother Queen Euphemia had published the recently translated (by her command) famous poems, the Euphemia songs. The couple had two children before Duke Erik was murdered.

=== Leader of the Ducal party ===
Upon the imprisonment of her spouse and her brother-in-law, she and her cousin and sister-in-law, Ingeborg Eriksdottir, became the leaders of their spouses' followers. On 16 April 1318, the two duchesses Ingeborg made a treaty in Kalmar with the Danish duke Christoffer of Halland-Samsö and archbishop Esgar of Lund to free their husbands and not to make peace with the kings of Sweden and Denmark before they agreed to this, and the two duchesses promised to honor the promises they gave in return in the names of their husbands. Later the same year, their husbands were confirmed to have died.

=== Political role during Magnus's minority ===
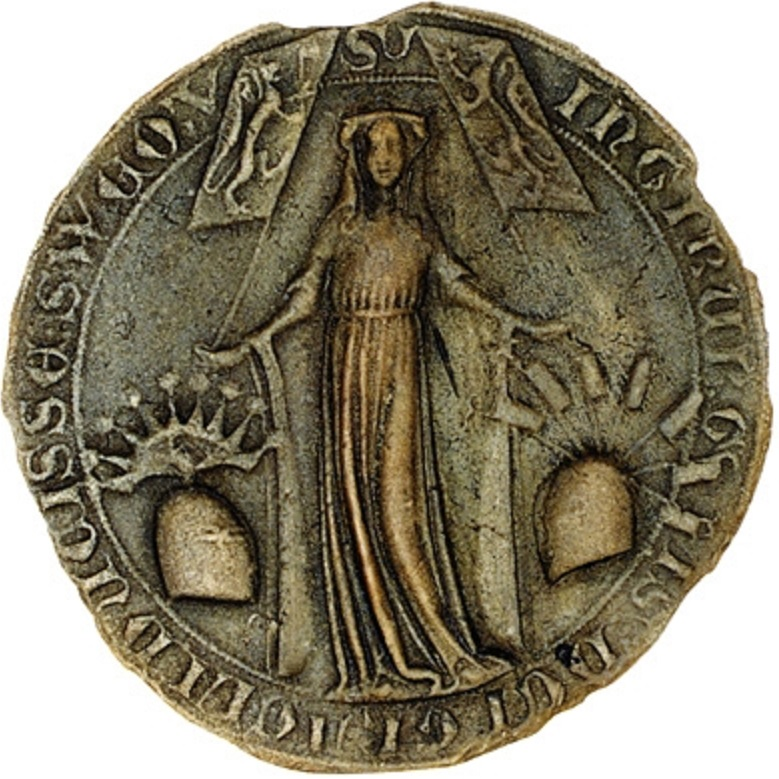
Seal of Duchess Ingeborg

Following the death of her father, King Haakon V of Norway, in May 1319, Ingeborg's three-year-old son Magnus Eriksson succeeded to the Norwegian throne. Haakon had amended the Norwegian law of succession in 1302, giving a legitimate daughter's legitimate son a stronger position in the order of succession. On 8 July 1319, Magnus was also elected king of Sweden, establishing a personal union between the two kingdoms.

Because Magnus was a minor, governments were established to rule on his behalf in both kingdoms. Ingeborg, as the king's mother and, in Norway, a person with her own place in the succession, acquired a prominent political position. The precise nature of her authority is disputed. Swedish biographical scholarship describes her as head of the minority government and as a member of both the Swedish and Norwegian councils, while Norwegian historian Erik Opsahl states that she participated in the government without holding a formal position in the royal administration and notes that more recent research has weakened the traditional view that she assumed control of the governments of both kingdoms.

Ingeborg used the title Ingeborg, by the grace of God, daughter of King Haakon, duchess in the kingdom of Sweden, and maintained her principal residence at Varberg. She gradually sought greater independent influence over royal policy, continuing the Scandinavian political ambitions of her late husband, Duke Erik Magnusson. Her policies initially received support from prominent Norwegian and Swedish nobles, but opposition to her and her ally Canute Porse increased during the early 1320s.

Duchess Ingeborg held her own court at her residence in Varberg. Letters 1318-1321 reveal that powerful Swedish men took advantage of the young dowager duchess by having her issue, alone and over her own seal, documents to their advantage as compensation for their support of the murdered dukes Erik and Valdemar and of little Magnus's right to the throne. In Sweden, Ingeborg was largely excluded from the day-to-day government in 1322, and a similar political change followed in Norway in February 1323. In Sweden her remaining political position was progressively weakened between 1323 and 1326, although she continued to exercise some influence in Norway. Her political role did not disappear entirely, but after her marriage to Canute Porse in 1327 her influence within the Norwegian and Swedish governments was substantially reduced.

=== Favourites ===
She was criticized for her way of conducting her own politics without the counsel of the Swedish and Norwegian councils, and for using the royal seal of her son for her own wishes. 1 October 1320, she liberated Riga from its debts in her name on behalf of her son. She was known to make large donations to her supporters. Canute Porse had been one of the supporters of her spouse and was appointed governor of Varberg. Ingeborg surrounded herself with young foreign men, thought to affect her politics, of which Canute was the most known. 12 April 1321, the Swedish council, after receiving complaints from the Norwegian council regarding a rumour of crimes and disturbances in Ingeborg's lands made by foreigners, told the Norwegian council to advise Ingeborg to listen more to the advice of the old experienced men in the councils rather than to young inexperienced foreign men; a law was created which banned foreigners from being members of the Swedish council and from castellanships of Swedish castles.

=== The Scania affair ===
Ingeborg and Canute had the ambition to make the then Danish Scania a part of her possessions. In 1321, Ingeborg arranged a marriage with her daughter Euphemia and Albert II, Duke of Mecklenburg. The marriage was arranged with the terms that Mecklenburg, Saxony, Holstein, Rendsborg and Slesvig would assist Ingeborg in the conquest of Scania. This was approved by the council of Norway but not Sweden. To finance the invasion, Ingeborg took a loan from Stralsund with free trade in Sweden and Norway as security. When Ingeborg's forces under command of Canute invaded Scania in 1322–23, Mecklenburg betrayed her to Denmark and the alliance was broken.

=== Conflict with the councils and diminished power ===
In 1322, open conflict broke out between Ingeborg and the Swedish regency council. The council of state made an agreement that no order from Ingeborg should thereafter be accepted without the approval from the entire council, and all agreements made with her by individual councillors were annulled. In 1323, Ingeborg was forced to accept the terms and give up several of her strategical castles and fiefs.

On 20 February 1323, the Norwegian regency council rebelled against Ingeborg. She was accused of misusing the royal seal, to have broken the peace with Denmark and for greater costs, and was replaced as head of the regency. After 1323, Ingeborg's power was limited to what was approved by votes in the councils, which in practice had deposed her. On 14 February 1326, in exchange for having her debts paid, Ingeborg gave up several fiefs, was forced to send Canute into exile and was stripped from all political authority in the Swedish regency council. In the Norwegian regency council, however, her signature was still needed in the 14 June 1327 peace treaty between Norway and Sönderjylland.

Ingeborg married her lover Canute Porse (d. 1330), a noble from less than royal circles, on 21 June 1327. While Canute had become Duke of Halland in 1326 as vassal of King Valdemar III of Denmark and was allowed to become holder of Ingeborg's inherited estates, her new marriage was another reason why the Swedes, and an increasing number of Norwegians, did not allow Ingeborg to use her governmental power in these kingdoms. The year of her second marriage, Ingeborg was also stripped from her power in the Norwegian regency council.

=== Later life ===
Her husband was made Duke of Estonia in 1329. In 1330, she again became a widow on 30 May 1330 because Canute got murdered. Her younger sons became dukes of Halland. Her eldest son became an adult in 1332, and the same year, Ingeborg secured Swedish superiority (until 1360) over Scania. After the death of her second husband, Ingeborg again took an important position in the life of her son the king, but it is not known how much influence she had on him.

In 1336, Ingeborg welcomed her daughter Euphemia and her son-in-law Albert of Mecklenburg, Rudolf I, Duke of Saxe-Wittenberg and Henry of Holstein with her own fleet to the coronation of her son and his wife in Stockholm. In 1341, Ingeborg and the counts Henry and Claus of Holstein went to war against Valdemar of Schleswig, John of Holstein and the Hanseatic league in Denmark. Ingeborg was residing at Kalundborg in Denmark at the time and was attacked by King Valdemar IV there; after two years of alternating conflicts and agreements the matter was settled against King Valdemar, who however regained Copenhagen Castle. King Magnus sealed the peace by telling Valdemar to keep the promise he had made to Ingeborg in the peace treaty. In 1350, she inherited the title and position of Duke of Halland from her younger son.

== Children and family ==
With Duke Erik Magnusson, Ingeborg had two children:

- Magnus Eriksson (1316–1374), king of Sweden and Norway
- Euphemia of Sweden, duchess of Mecklenburg (1317– c. 1370)

With Canute Porse, Duke of Halland and Estonia, Ingeborg had two sons, who died of the plague:

- Haakon, Duke of Halland, died 1350
- Canute, Duke of Halland, died 1350

== Legacy ==
Along with Swedish-Italian Saint Bridget and reigning Queen Margaret of Scandinavia, Ingeborg has been called one of the most important Scandinavian women in European history.

The controversy around Ingeborg's second marriage and the potential succession of her son Haakon to the Norwegian throne are an important part of the plot of the novel Kristin Lavransdatter by Sigrid Undset.

== Works cited ==
- Bagge, Sverre (2007). "Aims and means in the inter-Nordic conflicts 1302–1319". Scandinavian Journal of History. 32 (1): 5–37. doi:10.1080/03468750701191503. ISSN 0346-8755.
- Opsahl, Erik (2025-03-25). "Ingebjørg Håkonsdatter". Store norske leksikon (in Norwegian).

Swedish royalty
Preceded by Haakon	Duchess of Halland; 1350–1361	Succeeded by Bengt Algotsson
Preceded by Valdemar II	Duchess of Estonia with Canute II until 1330; 1329-1332	Succeeded by Otto I
