= Joseph Owen (businessman) =

British-Danish industrialist (1789–1862)

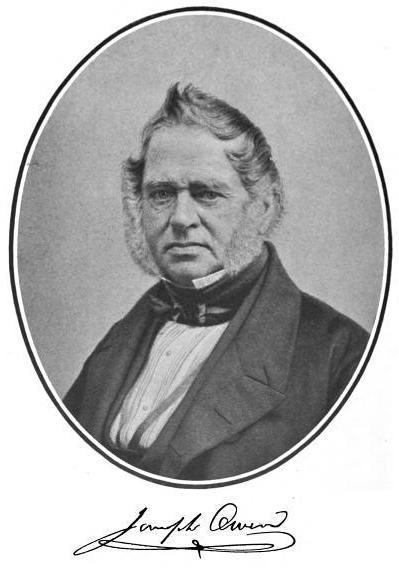
- Born: 15 May 1789; London, United Kingdom
- Died: 7 September 1862 (aged 73); Ordrup, Denmark
- Occupation: Industrialist

Joseph Owen (15 May 1789 – 7 September 1862) was a British-Danish industrialist. He founded Fredens Mølles Fabrikker on Amager in 1746.

== Early life and education ==
Owen was born on 15 May 1789, in Chelsea, London, the son of lawyer Charles Owen (c. 1765 – 1805) and Mary Newman (died 1793). He went to school in Westminster and received a commercial education in Danzig and Manchester.

== Career ==
Owen began working for Ryberg & Co. circa 1813. A few years later he established as a wine merchant. In 1821, he founded a mill which manufactured bone char for the city's sugar refineries. The activities were later expanded with the production of fertilizers. In 1826 he purchased Fredens Mølle on Amager and in 1831 established the first production of sulfuric acid in the Nordic countries.

In 1846 he was the driving force behind the foundation of A/S Fredens Mølles Fabriker and served as the company's first managing director.

== Other activities ==
Owen was elected to Stænderforsamlingen in Roskilde in 1834, 1840 and 1846. He was a member of the Copenhagen City Council from 1840 to 1846. He was a candidate for Landstinget in 1849 but, in spite of support from the Society of the Friends of Peasants, was not elected.

== Property ==
Owen owned an estate in Jutland. In 1840 he was granted a concession on the reclamation of Nissum Fjord. He later sold the concession to a British company which constructed Thorsminde Canal and Lock.

== Personal life and legacy ==
Owen married Susanne Christine van der Pallien (1 August 1794 – 15 November 1884) on 1 March 1816 in the Church of the Holy Ghost in Copenhagen. She was a daughter of Ryberg & Co. partner Georg Daniel van der Pallien (c. 1764–1841) and Elisabeth (Betsy) Juditha Christiansen (c. 1778–1865).

Owen died on 7 September 1862 in Ordrup and is buried at Assistens Cemetery in Copenhagen. Owen's eldest son, George Owen, had founded Aldersro Brickworks and Aldersro Brewery at Vibenshus Runddel in 1856–1860. Fredens Mølles Fabrikker was continued by his younger son Frederick Owen.

Fredens Mølles Fabrikker was located at Amagerbrogade 11. The factory was destroyed by fire in 1890. It was sold to the Danish Sulphuric Acid and Superphosphate Plant (Dansk Svovlsyre- og Superphosfatfabrik) and moved to Kastrup in the early 1900s. The site on Amagerbrogade was sold to Hermann Ebert, founder of nearby Eberts Villaby. He demolished the factory and constructed an apartment building at the site in 1906. The building was designed by K. E. Mandrup Poulsen. It is called Fredens Mølle and a relief above one of the doors commemorates the long industrial history of the site.
