= Ferdinand Anton Danneskiold-Laurvig =

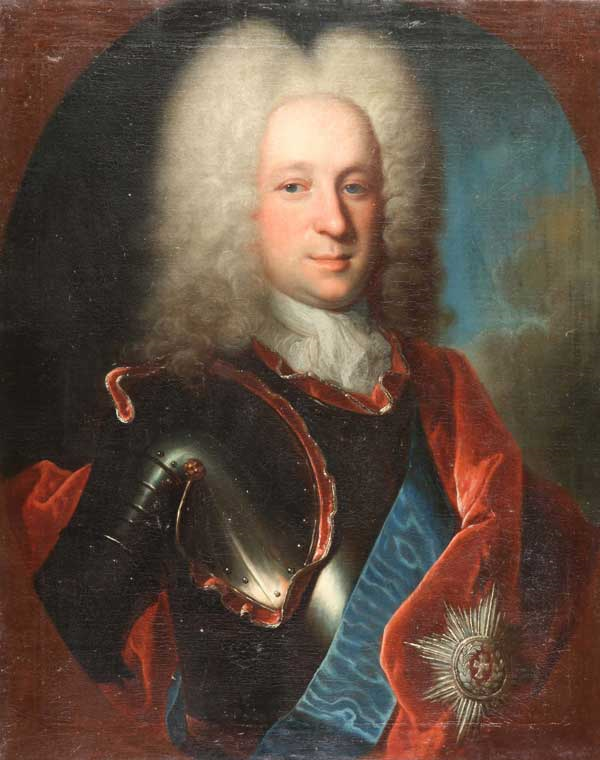
- Ferdinand Anton Danneskiold-Laurvig
- Born: 1 July 1688; Dresden
- Died: 18 September 1754 (aged 66); Copenhagen, Denmark
- Occupation: Estate owner
- Relatives: Ulrik Frederik Gyldenløve (his father); King Frederick III (his grandfather)
- Awards: Order of the Elephant

Ferdinand Anton Danneskiold-Laurvig (or Laurwigen; 1 July 1688 – 18 September 1754), count of Larvik, Gehejmekonferensråd (Privy Councillor) and director of the Danish West India Company from 1723.

== Early life and education ==
The son of Ulrik Frederik Gyldenløve and Augusta af Aldenburg, Ferdinand Anton was born on 1 July 1688 at the Gyldenløve Mansion on Kongens Nytorv in Copenhagen. From an early age he was appointed as Chamberlain. In 1714 he became avener.

== Property ==
When his father died in 1704 he inherited several large estates, including the County of Laurvig in Norway and Herzhorn in Schleswig-Holstein. He also received Gyldenløve's Little Mansion on Bredgade in Copenhagen. In the early 1720s he altered the house with the assistance of the architect Johan Cornelius Krieger.

== Career ==
In 1713 he was appointed gehejmeråd and was awarded the Order of the Elephant two weeks later. After his first wife had died in 1712, only a year after their marriage, on 20 December 1713 he married Ulrike Eleonore Reventlow, sister of Anne Sophie Reventlow.

Count Danneskiold-Laurvig was neither much in favour with King Frederick IV nor his successor, King Christian VI.

On 11 January 1723 he was appointed as director of the Danish West India Company.

He died in Copenhagen on 18 September 1754 and was buried from the Church of Our Lady.

== See also ==
- Danneskiold-Laurvig Mansion
