= Margrethe Pape =

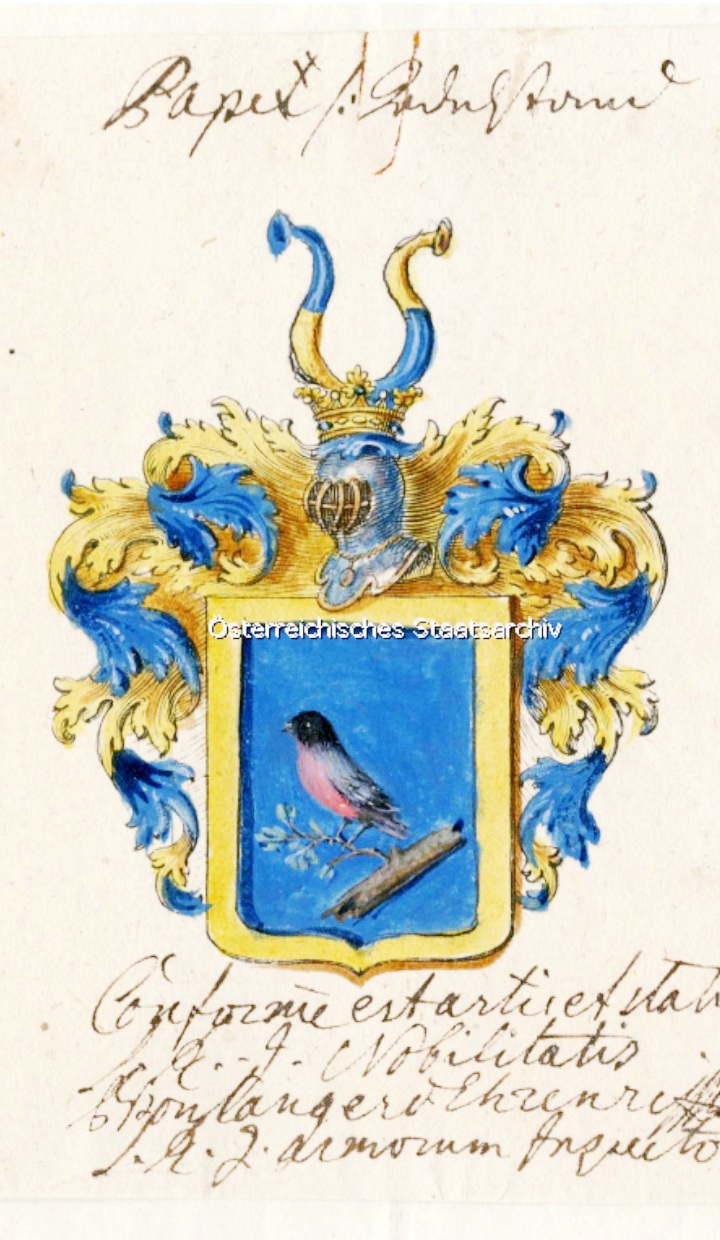
Coat of Arms of the Pape family

Margrethe von Pape (1620–1684) was a German noblewoman and a Danish royal mistress.

== Biography ==
Margarethe was born into the minor German noble family from Schleswig-Holstein, as the only daughter of Nicolaus von Pape (1580-1620), the Court marshal of Itzehoe, and his wife, Anna von Hatten (b. 1600).

She was the mistress of King Frederick III of Denmark and the mother of Ulrik Frederik Gyldenløve.

Margrethe Pape became the lover of Frederick of Denmark prior to his marriage and succession to the throne. She married the official, Daniel Hausmann (d. 1670), amtsforvalter (county administrator) of Segeberg and etatsråd.

In 1683, Christian V of Denmark granted her the title Baroness of Løvendal.
