= Ulrik Frederik Gyldenløve =

- Governor-general of Norway
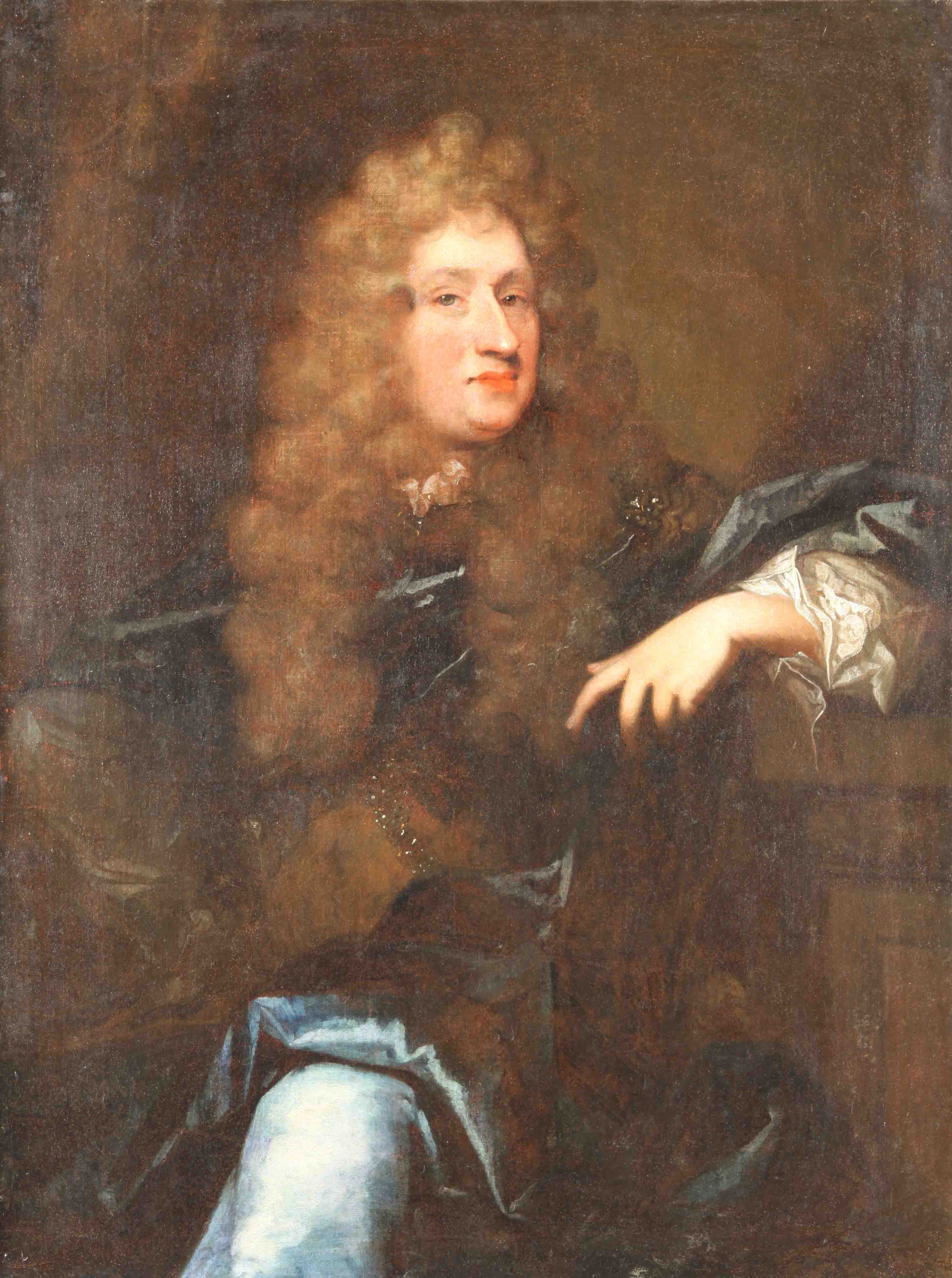
- Born: 20 July 1638; Bremen (present-day Germany)
- Died: 17 April 1704 (aged 65); Hamburg, Germany
- Spouse: Sophie Urne (m. 1659; div. 1660); Marie Grubbe (m. 1660; div. 1670) Antoinette Augusta (m. 1670; died 1701)
- House: Oldenburg
- Father: Frederick III of Denmark
- Mother: Margarethe von Pape

Ulrik Frederik Gyldenløve, Landgrave of Laurvig (20 July 1638 – 17 April 1704) was the illegitimate son of Frederick III of Denmark–Norway. A good relationship to his half brother, Christian V, secured him a position as one of the leading statesmen and largest landowners in Denmark–Norway. He was the leading general in Norway during the Scanian War, whose Norwegian leg is conventionally named the Gyldenløve War after him. He later served as Governor-general of Norway (Stattholdere i Norge) from 1664 to 1699. In Norway, he established the Countship of Laurvig and succeeded Peter Griffenfeld to the Countship of Tønsberg (until then Griffenfeld and later Jarlsberg). His extensive holdings in Denmark included Gyldenholm, Sorgenfri and Skjoldenæsholm.

== Early life ==
Gyldenløve was born in Bremen, Germany, the illegitimate son of Prince Frederick, later King Frederick III of Denmark, who was at the time Prince-Archbishop of Bremen and coadjutor of the Bishopric of Halberstadt. His mother was Margrethe von Pape (1620–1684), a minor German noblewoman who was made Baronesse of Løvendal by King Christian IV on September 15 that same year. When his father became King of Denmark–Norway in 1648, Ulrik Frederik assumed the surname Gyldenløve which was used by illegitimate sons of Danish kings.

During the first half of the 1650s, he traveled in Europe, visiting France, Italy and Spain. He attended the University of Siena in 1654 and in Rome in 1655. On 21 August 1655 he became a naturalised Danish noble.

== Military career ==
In 1661, he was put in charge at Vordingborg and appointed commander of Kalø Castle at Århus. In 1657 he became colonel in Norway. Gyldenløve participated in the Dano-Swedish War (1658–1660), where he distinguished himself in the Battle of Nyborg on 14 November 1659.

== Civil career and holdings in Norway ==
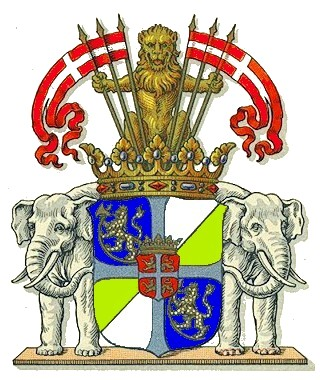
Gyldenløve's coat of arms

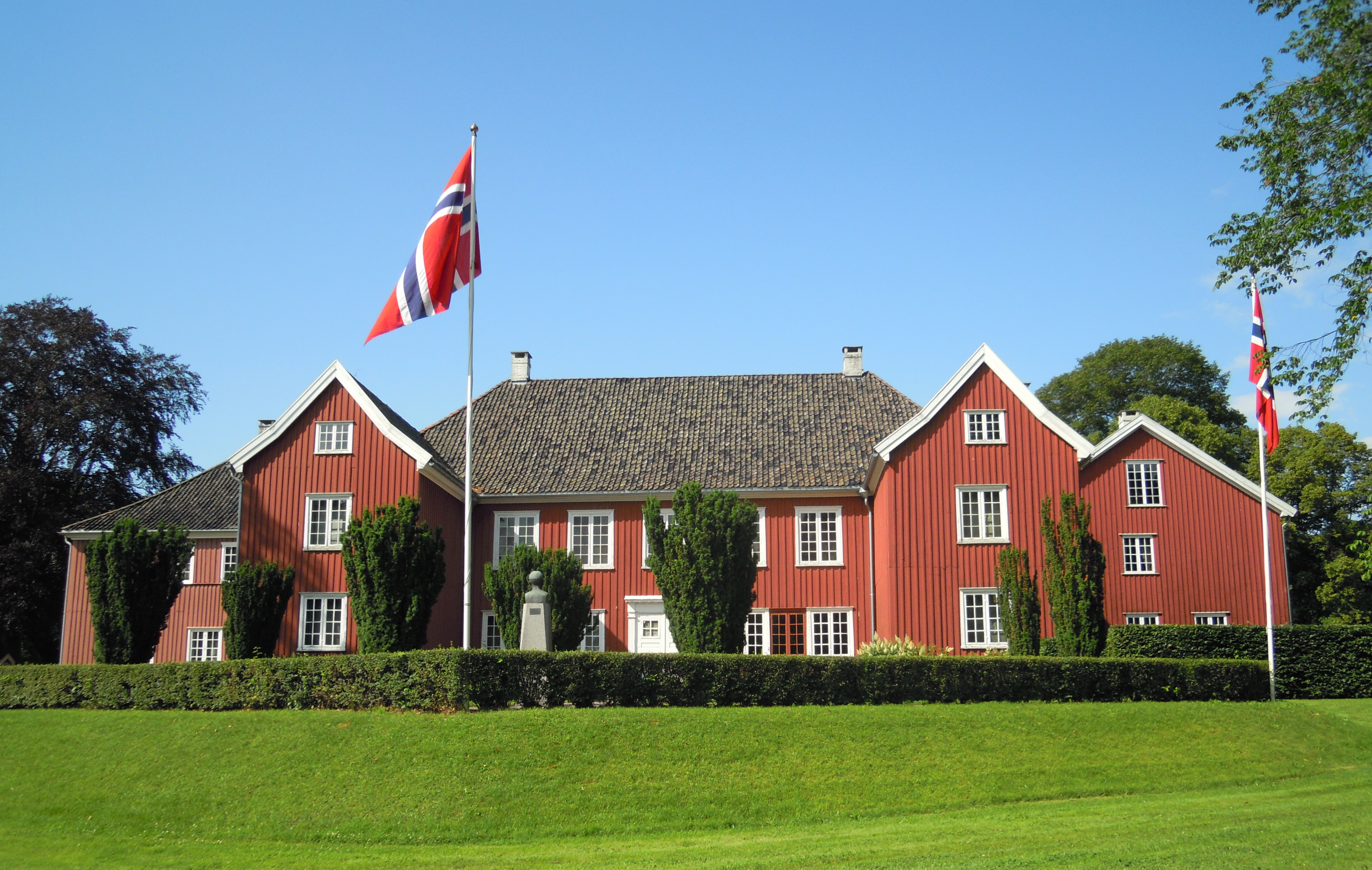
Herregården Manor House - Larvik Museum

In 1664, Gyldenløve was appointed viceroy (Statholder) of Norway, replacing Iver Krabbe (1602–1666). He studied conditions in Norway very carefully and became a strong advocate for many important reforms, such as a simplified tax system and the establishment of a Court of Appeals in Norway separate from the one in Denmark. He is also remembered for his role in the construction and improvement of nine fortresses along the Swedish border.

Gyldenløve took part in the 17th-century Dano-Swedish wars where he was particularly successful at the Battle of Nyborg on 14 November 1659. In 1666, he became commander-in-chief of the Norwegian army, which was victorious in the Scanian Wars (1675–1679).

Gyldenløve implemented the reforms initiated by the prior Governor-general Hannibal Sehested (1609–1666) effecting taxation, defense, justice, and protection for tenant farmers.

In 1671, Gyldenløve founded the city of Laurvig (modern-day Larvik), and was named Count of Laurvig. In Larvik, he is remembered for the construction of Larvik Church (Larvik kirke), its main church, as well as Laurvig Manor House (Laurvig Herregården), which is still one of the largest wooden structures in Norway. Larvik Church was inaugurated in 1677. Gyldenløve issued a gift to the church where the interest on the capital was to be used for maintenance. Laurvig Manor House was built beginning in 1674 and was completed for his third wedding with Antoinette Augusta von Aldenburg in 1677.

== Career and holdings in Denmark ==
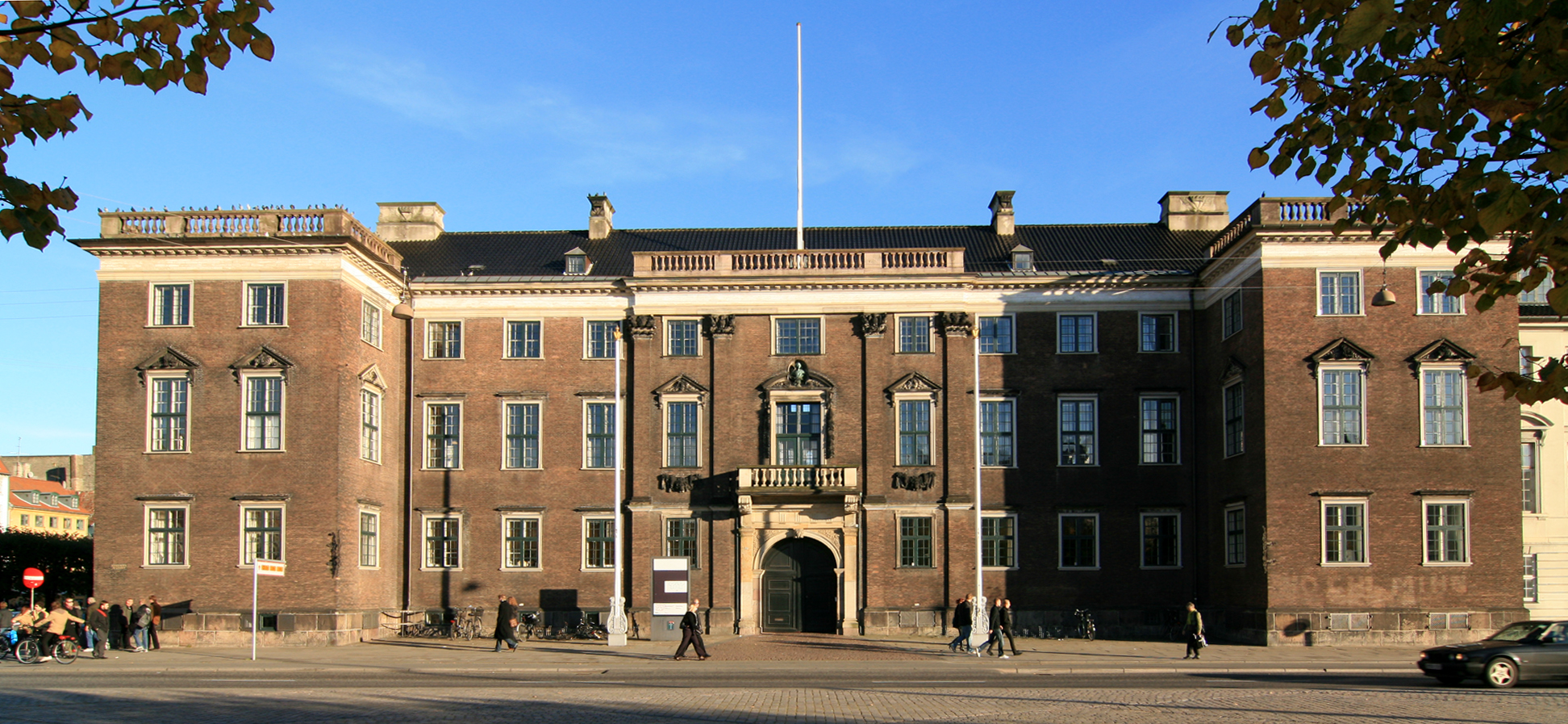
Charlottenborg Palace

Gyldenløve spent long periods away from Norway, either in Copenhagen or on diplomatic missions abroad. Between August 1668 and July 1673, he only visited Norway on one occasion in the summer of 1668. 1671 saw him appointed as Lord Chamberlain (Overkammerherre). In 1661, he was created a Blue Knight. In 1671, he was created a White Knight.

He played a central role in Danish politics. Together with Frederik Ahlefeldt and Peder Schumacher Griffenfeld, he played a key role in Christoffer Gabel's fald in 1670. A dispute with Griffenfeld, who served as Chancellor of Denmark, in 1673 forced him back to Norway. In 1679, he moved back to Copenhagen. He would only visit Norway four more times during his remaining years as governor-general of Norway.

His holdings in Denmark included Kalø (1661-70), Østrup im Asminderød (1670-78), Mørup in Fjenneslev (1672-78), Tybjerggaard at Præstø (1672-78), Christiansholm, Turø (1674-1702), Gyldenlund (1671-83), Skjoldenæsholm at Ringsted and Sorgenløss at Kongens Lyngby (1692?-1702).

On 22 March 1669, King Christian V, Gyldenløve's half brother, presented him with a large parcel of land on the new square Kongens Nytorv in Copenhagen. Gyldenløve built his new mansion (now known as Charlottenborg Palace after a later owner) from 1672 to 1683 as the first building on the new square. The adjacent Nyhavn canal was initially known as Gyldenløve's (New) Canal. The Gyldenløve Mansion's extensive garden occupied most of the land on the south side of the canal.

In 1700, he sold the Gyldenløve Mansion to dowager queen Charlotte Amalie. In Copenhagen, he also owned Gyldenløve's Little Mansion on Bredgade and Nlågård outside the city.

== Personal life and legacy ==
Count Ulrik Frederik married three times: He first married in 1659 Sophie Urne (1629–1714), daughter of Jørgen Urne and Margrete Marsvin, who he had to leave for his second marriage with Marie Grubbe (1643–1718) 1660, from whom he was divorced after nine years in 1670. His third wife was Countess Antoinette Augusta von Aldenburg (1660–1701), eldest daughter of Anton I, Count von Aldenburg und Knyphausen (by his first wife, Countess Auguste Johanna zu Sayn-Wittgenstein-Hohenstein), legitimated son of Anton Gunther. He belonged to the Delmenhorst cadet branch of the House of Oldenburg whose senior line became hereditary kings of Denmark. Ulrik Frederik's two first marriages ended in divorces, but he has descendants from the first and third.

He had many children, both legitimate and illegitimate, four of whom lived to adulthood, married, and left descendants:

By Sophie Urne:

1. Woldemar Gyldenløve (1660–1740), later Baron of Lowendal, father of German officer and statesmen Ulrich Frédéric Woldemar, Comte de Lowendal (1700–1755)
2. Carl Løvendal (1660–1689) committed suicide on a ship near São Tomé

By Countess Antoinette Augusta von Aldenburg:

1. Countess Charlotte Amalie af Danneskiold-Samsøe (1682–1699) wed Christian Gyldenløve (1674–1703), an illegitimate son of Christian V of Denmark
2. Ulrikke Amalie Antoinette af Danneskiold-Samsøe (1686–1755), wed Count Carl von Ahlefeldt (1670–1722)
3. Ferdinand Anton Danneskiold-Laurvig, Count af Danneskiold-Samsøe (1688–1754), wed Countess Ulrikke Eleonore af Reventlow (1690–1754)

Through his daughter, Charlotte Amalie, and her daughter, Countess Frederikke Louise af Danneskiold-Samsø, Ulrik Frederik became the ancestor of the Dukes of Augustenborg and thus, among others, of Frederick VIII, Duke of Schleswig-Holstein and the German Empress Augusta.

Gyldenløve died on 17 April 1704 in Hamburg. He was buried in the Church of Our Lady in Copenhagen, which was destroyed during the British bombardment of Copenhagen in 1807. Fragments of his sarcophagus have survived.

== See also ==
- Christian Hansen Ernst
- Gyldenløve

== Other sources ==
- A History of Norway by Karen Larson (Princeton University Press), 1948
- The History of the Norwegian People by Knut Gjerset (MacMillan), 1915
- Ulrik Frederik Gyldenløve by Otto von Munthe af Morgenstierne(København, E. Munksgaard), 1944

Danish nobility
New creation	Count of Laurvig; 1671–1704	Succeeded by Ferdinand Anton Danneskiold-Laurvig
