= Landgrave of Langeland =

Territorial title in pre-modern Denmark

Landgrave of Langeland was a territorial title for the ruler of Langeland in Denmark. The county had its roots in the 1358 conquest of Langeland by Valdemar IV of Denmark against the Duke of Schleswig. Its capital was Tranekær Castle a 13th-century castle.

Before it was a separate lordship it was part of the Duchy of Schleswig. It was separated from the Duchy and given to a brother of the Duke of Schleswig. Langeland was assigned as a fief in the middle ages to various different people. These are the original lords of Langeland. In 1659 with the permission of the king the Count of Rantzau handed Tranekær county over to Frederik Ahlefeldt. He later became the Landgrave of Langeland in 1672.

== List of Landgraves of Langeland ==
Ruler	Born	Reign	Death	House	Consort	Notes
Abel, Lord of Langeland	1218	1257-1279	1279	Estridsen	a daughter of Gunzelin III, Count of Schwerin	Split with brother Eric I, Duke of Schleswig
Eric Longlegs, Lord of Langeland	1272	1279-1310	1310	Estridsen	Sophia of Querfurt	Nephew of the preceding

Ruler	Born	Reign	Death	House	Consort	Notes
Frederik Ahlefeldt	1623	1672-1686	1686	Ahlefeldt (noble family)	Margarethe Dorothea zu Rantzau	Title created for
Frederik Ahlefeldt II	1662	1686-1708	1708	Ahlefeldt (noble family)	Christiane Gyldenløve (1672-1689)	Son of the preceding
Carl Ahlefeldt	1670	1708-1722	1722	Ahlefeldt (noble family)	Ulrikke Antoinette Danneskiold-Laurvig	Brother of the preceding
Frederik Ahlefeldt III	1702	1722-1773	1773	Ahlefeldt (noble family)	Marie Elisabeth Ahlefeldt	Son of the preceding
Ulrik Carl Ahlefeldt	1704	1722-1758	1758	Ahlefeldt (noble family)		Brother of the Preceding, apparently shared the title
Conrad Ahlefeldt	1707	1722-1791	1791	Ahlefeldt (noble family)		Brother of the Preceding, apparently shared the title
Ferdinand Ahlefeldt	1747	1791-1815	1815	Ahlefeldt (noble family)		Son of the preceding
Frederik Carl Christian Ulrich Ahlefeldt	1742	1791-1825	1825	Ahlefeldt (noble family)	Ditlefine Rantzau	Older brother of the preceding
Christian Ahlefeldt-Laurvigen	1732	1173-1791	1791	Ahlefeldt (noble family)	Elisabeth grevinde Juel	Son of Frederik Ahlefeldt III
Frederik Ahlefeldt-Lauervigen	1760	1791-1832	1832	Ahlefeldt (noble family)	Casta Magdalene Rasmussen	Son of the preceding
Christian Johan Frederik Ahlefeldt-Laurvig	1789	1832-1856	1856	Ahlefeldt (noble family)		Nephew of the preceding
Frederik Ludvig Vilhelm Ahlefeldt-Lauervigen	1817	1856-1889	1889	Ahlefeldt (noble family)	Marie Albertine Mathilde Ahlefeldt-Laurvigen	Son of the preceding
Christian Johan Frederik Ahlefeldt-Laurvig II	1844	1889-1917	1917	Ahlefeldt (noble family)	Johanne Ida Birgitte Augusta	Son of the preceding
Frederik Ludvig Vilhelm Ahlefeldt-Laurvig II	1870	1917-1947	1947	Ahlefeldt (noble family)	No wife	Son of the preceding
Kai Benedict Ahlefeldt-Laurvig	1903	1947-1985	1985	Ahlefeldt (noble family)		Nephew of the preceding
Ulrik Benedict Ahlefeldt-Laurvig	1939	1985-2021	2021	Ahlefeldt (noble family)		Son of the preceding
Michael Ahlefeldt-Laurvig-Bille	1965	2021–present	alive	Ahlefeldt (noble family)	Princess Alexandra of Sayn-Wittgenstein-Berleburg	Nephew of the preceding
