= Frederik Ahlefeldt =

Danish jurist and diplomat (1623–1686)

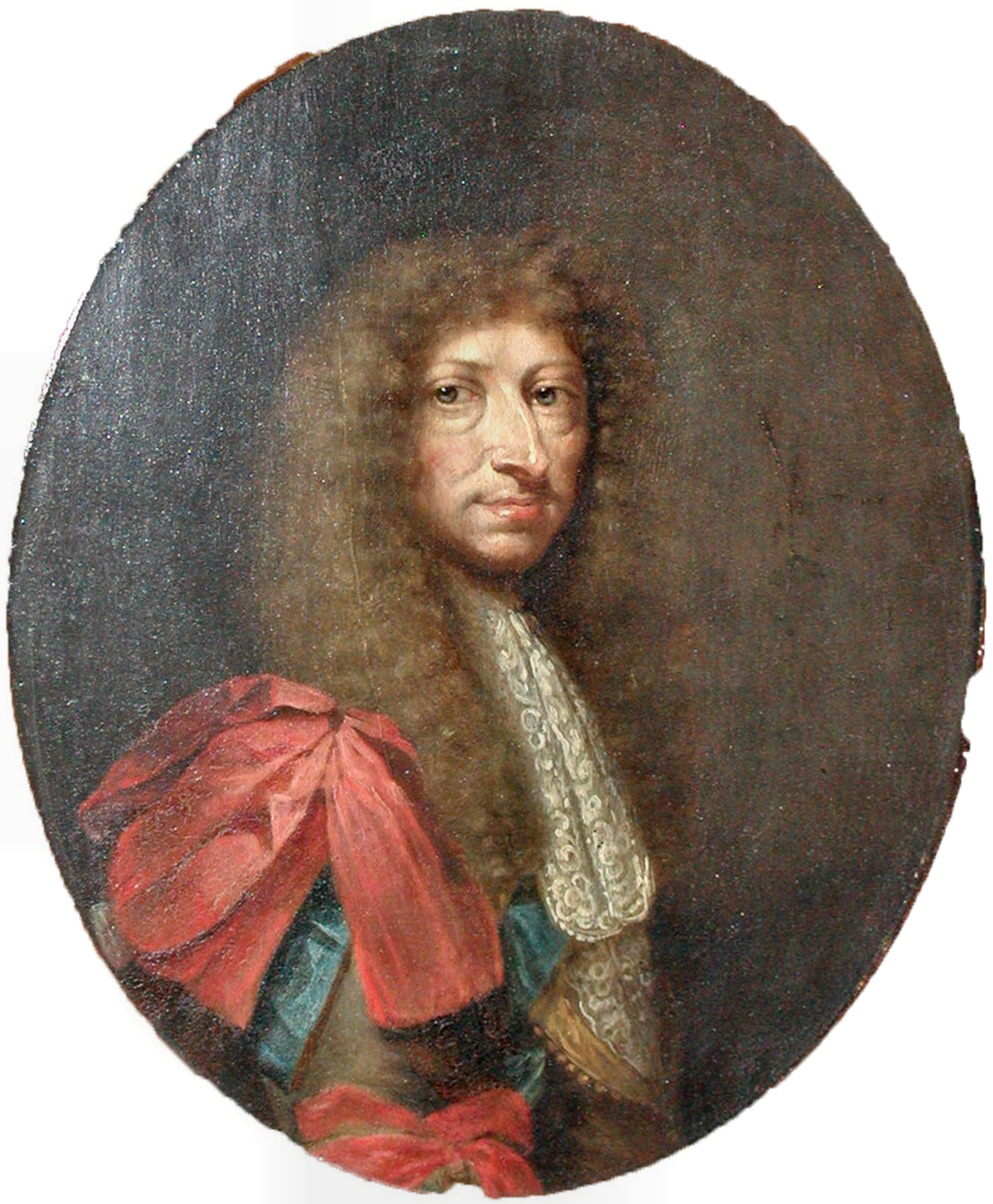

Grand Chancellor of Denmark
- Predecessor: Peder Griffenfeld
- Successor: Conrad von Reventlow
- Full name: Frederik Ahlefeldt; German: Friedrich von Ahlefeldt
- Born: 1623; Søgård, Denmark
- Died: 7 July 1686 (aged 62–63); Copenhagen, Denmark
- Spouses: Margarethe Dorothea zu Rantzau (m. 1656; died 1665); Marie Elisabeth zu Leiningen-Hartenburg-Dagsburg (m. 1668)
- Father: Frederik Ahlefeldt
- Mother: Brigitte Ahlefeldt (c. 1600–1632)

Count Frederik of Ahlefeldt-Rixingen (German: Friedrich von Ahlefeldt; 1623 in Søgård – 7 July 1686, in Copenhagen) was a Danish landowner and statesman. By birth member of the House of Ahlefeldt, he was the first reigning Count of Rixingen. He was also Grand Chancellor during the reign of King Christian V. He was also Landgrave of Langeland.

== Early life ==
Ahlefeldt was born on Søgård Manor, east of Kliplev in the Duchy of Schleswig as the eldest child and only son of Frederik of Ahlefeldt-Seestermühe (1594-1657) and his wife and relative, Birgitte of Ahlefeldt-Graasten (1600-1632). He had one younger sister, Elisabeth von Rumohr (1625-1653).

At age twenty, Ahlefeldt was sent on an educational tour of Europe, where over a six-year period he studied at universities in Jena, Bologna, Paris and Amsterdam. On this tour he was accompanied by later danish chamberlain and queen's favourite Jacob Petersen who served Ahlenfeldt as a valet on his travels.

== Career ==
In 1657, he was appointed to the Land Council as a commissioner. He also served in a diplomatic capacity to the state of Brandenburg on behalf of the Duke of Gottorp. In September 1659, he landed in Ystad with 460 men, but was later repulsed by Swedish forces under the command of Gustaf Otto Stenbock. In 1660, he was sent to England in a similar capacity, and there ended a trade and friendship treaty on behalf of Denmark which was signed February 1661. After his return, he was appointed as stadtholder for Copenhagen, then as a civil judge, and finally as a steward to the governor of Dithmarschen. During the early and mid 1660s he belonged to the influential circle around Hannibal Sehested, Hans Svane, Peter Bülche, Petersen and Theodor Lente, who became increasingly opposed to Frederick III's favorite Christoffer Gabel.

During 1670s and up to the fall of Gabel (1617–1673), Ahlefeldt was the leading minister of the government. In 1673, he was replaced by Peder Schumacher Griffenfeld (1635-1699). Following the arrest of Griffenfeld, Ahlefeldt was made chancellor again. He held that post until 1686.

== Holdings and titles ==
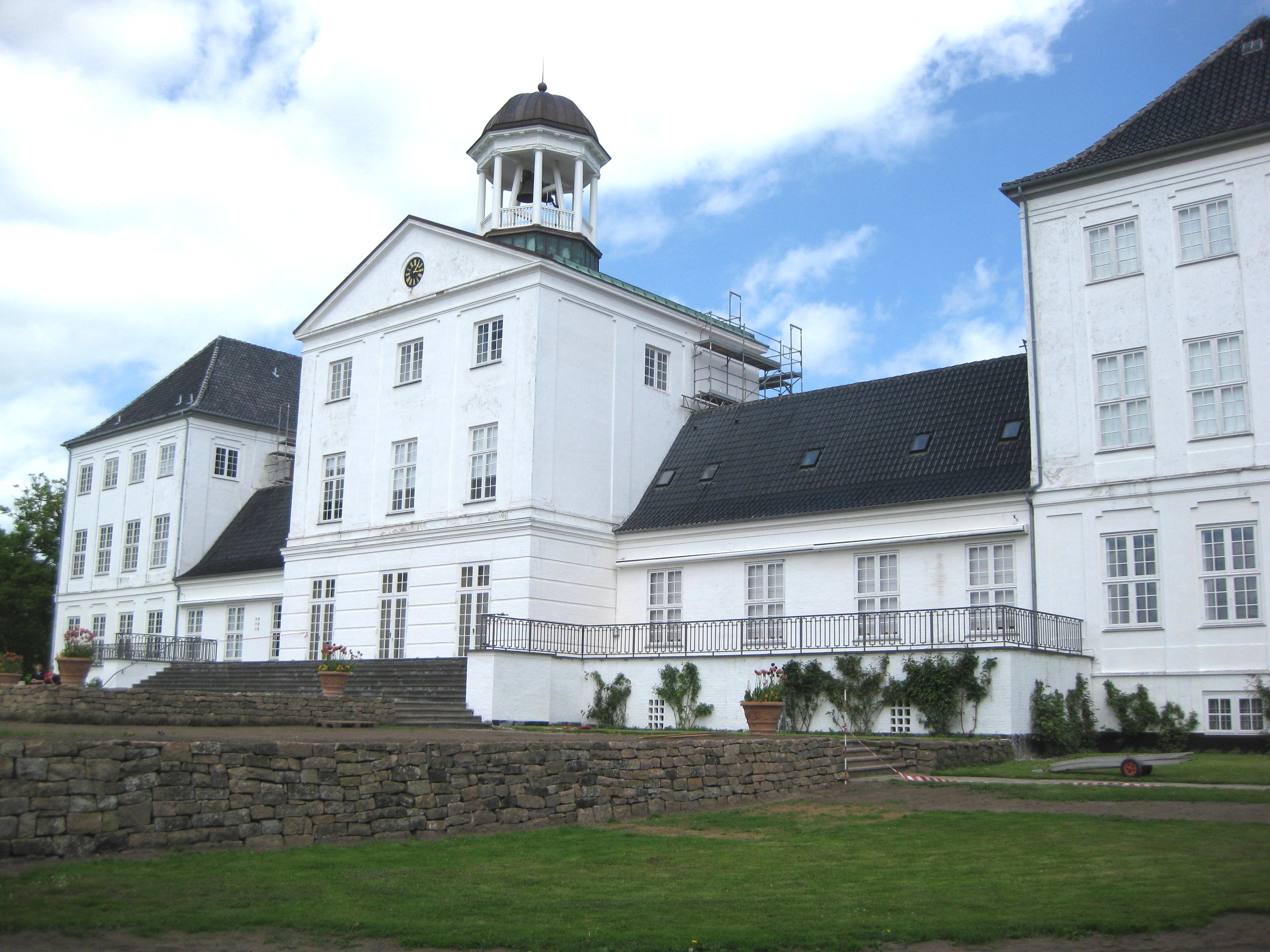
Gråsten Manor in Sønderjylland

Ahlefeldt owned Gråsten Manor, as well as estates at Søgård, Ballegård, and Herningsholm in Herning. He spent most of his time at Gråsten. On October 11, 1663, he received the Order of the Elephant.

In 1759, he received Tranekær Manor from his father-in-law as part of his wife's Dowry. In 1672, he became landgrave of the county of Langeland.

=== Imperial County of Rixingen ===
He was raised ad personam in 1665 to Heiliger Römischer Reichsgraf, Count of the Holy Roman Empire in immediate vassalage to the Holy Roman Emperor. But in 1669 he bought the County of Rixingen (later passed to the Dukes of Richelieu in 1751), thus becoming the real sovereign count. After his death, his son from his second marriage, Count Carl von Ahlefeldt, inherited the dominions of Rixingen and Mörsberg in 1686, which he later passed on to his brother-in-law, Count Friedrich Ludwig von Nassau-Ottweiler.

== Marriages ==
On 28 December 1656, Ahlefeldt married Countess Margarethe Dorothea zu Rantzau (18 March 1642, Breitenburg – 26 August 1665, Itzehoe). The only daughter of Count Christian zu Rantzau (1614–1663), governor of the Duchy of Holstein and one of Denmark's richest men. Ahlefeldt and Margarethe Dorothea had two children:

- Countess Christiane von Ahlefeldt-Rixingen (1659-1695); married Frederick Louis, Count of Nassau-Ottweiler and had issue
- Count Friedrich von Ahlefedt-Rixingen (1662–1708); married firstly Christiane Charlotte Gyldenløve (1672-1689), an illegitimate daughter of King Christian V of Denmark and Sophie Amalie Moth, Countess of Samsøe; married secondly Countess Armgard Margareta von Reventlow (1679-1709). He didn't have issue from either marriage.

On 1 December 1668 he married Countess Marie Elisabeth of Leiningen-Hartenburg-Dagsburg (10 March 1648, Hartenburg – 13 April 1724, Augustenburg), daughter of Friedrich Emich, Count von Leiningen-Dagsburg-Hartenburg (1621-1698) and his wife, Countess Sibylla von Waldeck (1619-1678), daughter of Christian, Count of Waldeck-Wildungen (1585-1637). Ahlefeldt and Marie Elisabeth had three children:

- Count Carl von Ahlefeldt-Rixingen: married Countess Ulrike Antoinette of Danneskiold-Laurvig (1686-1755) and had issue
- Countess Charlotte Sibylla von Ahlefeldt-Rixingen (1672-1726); married Count Georg Ludwig zu Solms-Rödelheim (1664-1715) and had issue
- Countess Sophie Amalie von Ahlefeldt-Rixingen (1675-1741); married Prince Frederick William of Schleswig-Holstein-Sonderburg-Augustenburg and had issue.

== Works cited ==
- Bonnesen, Sten (1924). Karl X Gustav [Charles X Gustav] (in Swedish). Gleerups.

Political offices
Preceded by Peder Griffenfeld	Grand Chancellor of Denmark; 1676 – 1686	Succeeded by Conrad von Reventlow
