= Carl von Ahlefeldt =

German-Danish statesman

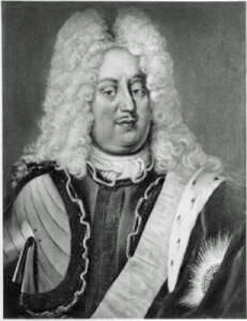
- Carl von Ahlefeldt in c. 1718
- Born: 25 April 1670; Hartenburg, Holstein
- Died: 7 September 1722 (aged 52); Gråsten, Denmark
- Resting place: Tranekær, Langeland, Denmark
- Occupations: Statesman, courtier, civil servant
- Known for: Courtier, Civil servant, landowner
- Spouse: Ulrikke Antoinette Danneskiold-Laurvig, fø
- Awards: Order of the Elephant

Carl von Ahlefeldt (25 April 1670 – 7 September 1722) was a German-Danish statesman. He was a stadtholder and by birth a member of the House of Ahlefeld. He was part of the inner circle around Frederick IV until 1712 and then became Governor-general of Slesvig-Holsten.

== Early life and travels ==
Ahlefeldt was born at Hardenburg as the youngest son of Grand Chancellor Count Friedrich von Ahlefeldt-Rixingen and his second wife, Countess Marie Elisabeth of Leiningen-Dagsburg-Hartenburg (1648-1724). His father provided him with a thorough education. In 1684–86, he went on a long journey as part of his education. He was escorted by Nikolai Henrik Masius as Hofmeister. After his return, he benefitted from a close relationship with the royal family at the royal court in Copenhagen. In 1692, he escorted Crown Prince Frederick on a journey to Germany, France and Italy. In 1695, he was appointed chamberlain (kammerherre). In 1696, he replaced Johan Georg Holstein as the Hofmeister of Prince Carl on a four-year journey to Germany, Switzerland, France, Italy and the Netherlands.

== Career at the royal court ==
After their return in 1699, he received a number of prominent appointments at the royal court. In 1699, he became overkammerherre and overhofmester for the knight's academy in Copenhagen (1699-1703). In 1700, he became overstaldmester. Together with Christian Gyldenløve, he belonged to the inner circle around the young king Frederick VIV, which overshadowed both Grand Chancellor Conrad Reventlow and gehejmeråd Chr. S. Plessen.

In 1704, Ahlefeldt was appointed to president of kommercekollegiet and from 1708 for politi- og kommercekollegiet. In 1710, he became a member of konseillet, replacing Christian Lente who had been opposed to Denmark's involvement in the Great Nordic Ear. As a member of konseillet, together with Otte Krabbe and Christian Sehested Ahelfeldt was responsible for the government in Copenhagen during the plague outbreak in 1711, while the king sought refuge at Koldinghus. After a few months, Ahlefeldt, Krabbe and Sehested, with permission the king, sought refuge at Jægersborg north of Copenhagen.

== Governor-general of Norway ==
In 1712, Ahlefeldt was removed from konseillet as a result of his conflicts with the Reventlow family which had strengthened their influence at the court due to the king's involvement with Anna Sophie Reventlow. Ahlefeldt was instead appointed to Governor-general of Slesvig-Holsten, an office he kept until his death.

== Holdings ==
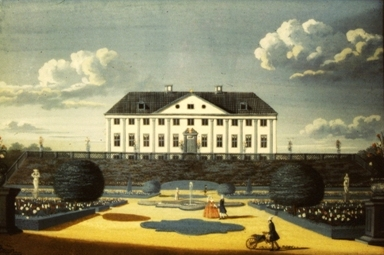
Sorgenfri in 1742

Ahlefeldt inherited the county of Rixingen and the barony of Mörsberg in Lothringen, but had parted with the latter in 1709. Neither of his two older brothers had children. He therefore also inherited the county of Langeland (including Tranekær) and the estates Søgård, Gråsten, Ballegård, Grøngrøft and Årup im Slesvig and Die Wildniss at Glückstadt.

In 1702, Carl von Ahlefeldt acquired an estate at Kongens Lyngby north of Copenhagen, where he commissioned the architect François Dieussart to build the first Sorgenfri. The building, a half-timbered, three-winged complex in Baroque style, was completed in 1705. The building was demolished and replaced by the current Sorgenfri Palace in the 1750s, reusing only the cellar and foundation of the old building. In 1703, he acquired an estate at Kalundborg from Frans Marselis and founded Østrup Manor (now Lerchenborg).

== Family ==
He married Countess Ulrike Antoinette of Danneskiold-Laurvig (1686-1755) on 2 March 1702 in Hamburg. She was the daughter of Count Ulrik Frederik Gyldenløve and his wife, Countess Antoinette Augusta of Aldenburg (1660–1701). They had the sons:

- Count Conrad Wilhelm of Ahlefeldt (1707-1791); married Wilhelmine Hedwig Antoinette von Gram (1711-1790) and had issue
- Count Frederik of Ahlefeldt (1702–73); married Bertha von Holstein (1705-1735) and had issue

== Decorations ==
- Knight of the Dannebrog, 1698
- Knight of the Elephant, 1703.
