= Ahlefeldt (noble family) =

Noble family

House of Ahlefeldt
- Noble house
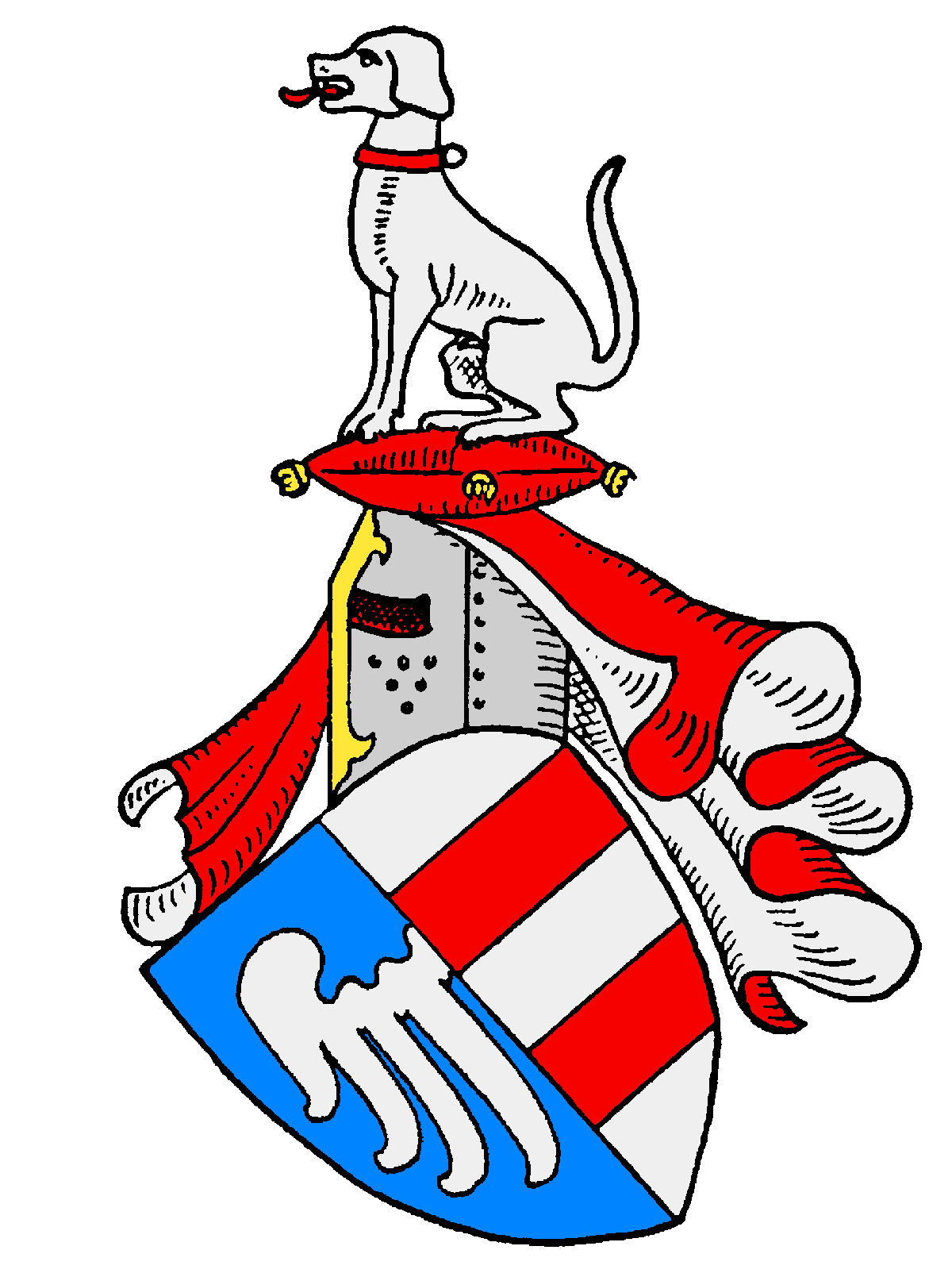
- Ahlefeldt family coat of arms.
- Country: Germany; Kingdom of Denmark
- Origin: Holstein
- Founded: 1321; 705 years ago
- Founder: Benedict von Ahlefeldt
- Current head: First line (Eskilsmark): Oscar Dolores, Count Ahlefeldt; Second line (Langeland): Christian Benedict, Count Ahlefeldt-Laurvig
- Historic seat: Tranekær Manor
- Titles: Imperial count; Lensgreve; Count; Comtesse; Baron; Baroness
- Connected families: Ahlefeldt-Rixingen; Ahlefeldt-Laurvig; Ahlefeldt-Laurvigen; Ahlefeldt-Laurvig-Bille; Ahlefeldt-Laurvig-Lehn; Danish Royal Family
- Estates: Tranekær Manor; Egeskov Castle; Frederiksdal House; Hvidkilde Estate; Eriksholm Castle; County of Langeland; County of Laurvig

The House of Ahlefeldt is an ancient German noble family with branches in Germany and across Scandinavia, most notably in Denmark, and subsequently in Sweden and Norway. It has identical coat of arms with the von Rumohr, von Bosendahl and von Rastorp German noble families, which indicates that they might have descended from one House.

== Legend ==
According to the legend, the family descended from "Hunold" Hunoldus comes de Schwabeck, whose great-grandson Konrad (Conradus baron de Alhefeld) 1152 participated in the murder of Herman II, Count of Winzenburg, and then, in 1153, he went to serve King Sven III. In 1154 Konrad was overthrown, and he and his family had to flee from Denmark. However, written of records and evidence of these events are unavailable.

== Origins ==
The family originated in Westensee, near Kiel, Germany. The earliest known ancestor is Benedictus de Prodole (d. circa 1340) from Perdöl, whose son and grandsons served King Waldemar of Denmark and received significant pawn fiefs and properties in Denmark. Descendants of his brother, Scacco de Prodole, also known as Scacco de Rumore were members of the House of Rumohr. Two other German noble houses belonged to the same genus and had identical coat of arms: von Bosendahl and von Rastorp, but both went extinct, the first in 1535 and the latter in 1749.

In Duchy of Schleswig the family inherited estates Søgård, Nør, Königsförde-Lindau, Sakstorp and Gelting. In Holstein, Bossee, Lehmkulen, Wittmold, Deutsch-Nienhof, Emkendorf, Kl. Nordsee, Haseldorf and Fresenburg. Godske von Ahlefeldt (d. 1541) was the last Catholic Bishop of Schleswig.

== Imperial Counts of Rixingen ==
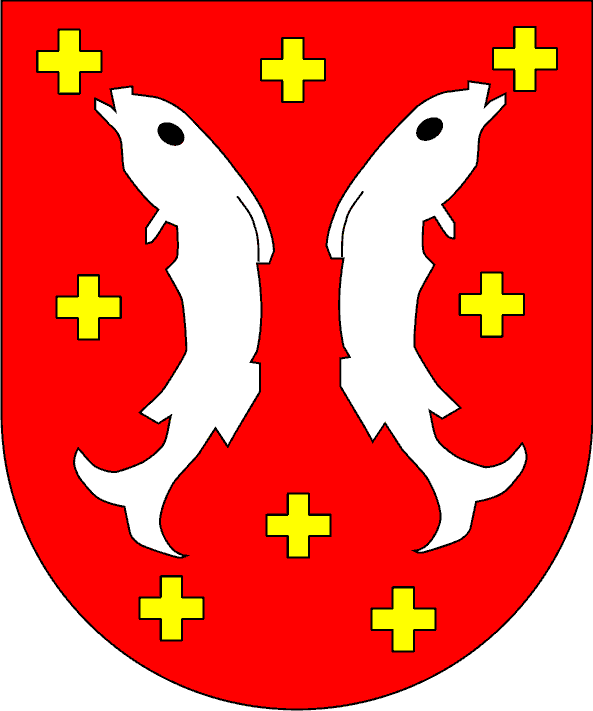
Coat of arms of the Rixingen Lordship and later Imperial county

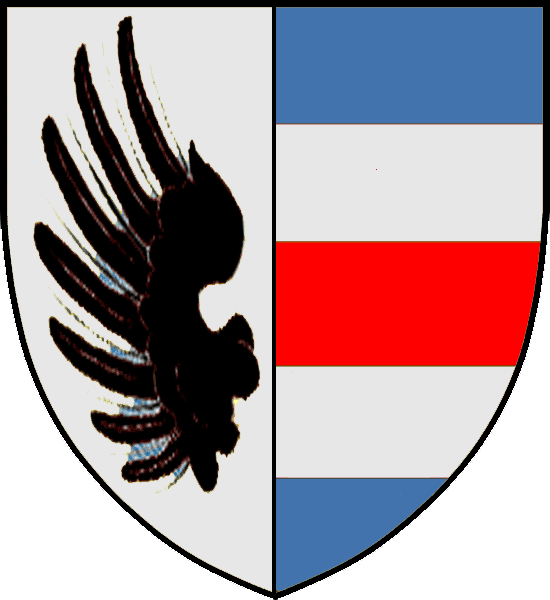
Variant Coat of Arms of the Ahlefeldt family

Friedrich von Ahlefeldt (1623-1686) was raised ad personam in 1665 to Heiliger Römischer Reichsgraf, Count of the Holy Roman Empire in immediate vassalage to the Holy Roman Emperor. But, in 1669, he bought the Imperial County of Rixingen (later passed to the Dukes of Richelieu in 1751), thus becoming the real sovereign count. Friedrich's daughter, Countess Christiane von Ahlefeldt-Rixingen (1659-1695) from his first marriage to Countess Magarethe Dorothea zu Rantzau (1642-1665) married Frederick Louis, Count of Nassau-Ottweiler. His two daughters from his second marriage to Countess Marie Elisabeth zu Leiningen-Dagsburg-Hartenburg (1648-1724), Countess Charlotte Sibylla (1672-1726) married Count Georg Ludwig zu Solms-Rödelheim (1664-1715) and Countess Sophie Amalie von Ahlefeldt-Rixingen married Prince Frederick William of Schleswig-Holstein-Sonderburg-Augustenburg. His two sons followed him as Governors in Schleswig and Holstein.

The son from his first marriage, Count Friedrich von Ahlefedt (1662–1708), married Christiane Charlotte Gyldenløve in 1687, an illegitimate daughter of King Christian V of Denmark with Sophie Amalie Moth, Countess of Samsøe. His son from his second marriage, Count Carl von Ahlefeldt, inherited the dominions of Rixingen and Mörsberg in 1686, which he later passed (in 1709) on to his brother-in-law, Count Friedrich Ludwig von Nassau-Ottweiler. After the death of his older half-brother in 1708 Carl inherited the county of Langeland with Tranekær Castle.

== Danish line (Ahlefeldt-Laurvig) ==
His kinsman, High royal councillor Burchard von Ahlefeldt received in 1672 letters patent as Danish count and the position of Lensgrave. He inherited the county of Langeland which was later inherited by his cousins, Imperial Counts von Ahlefeldt.

One of his grandsons, Count Christian von Ahlefeldt inherited the county of Laurvig in Norway, one of the two official counties ever in that country (the other was Jarlsberg, which belonged to the House of Wedel). In 1785 he received the royal licence to himself and his descendants to bear the name Ahlefeldt-Laurvig and later Ahlefeldt-Laurvig-Bille.

== German line (Ahlefeldt von Dehn) ==
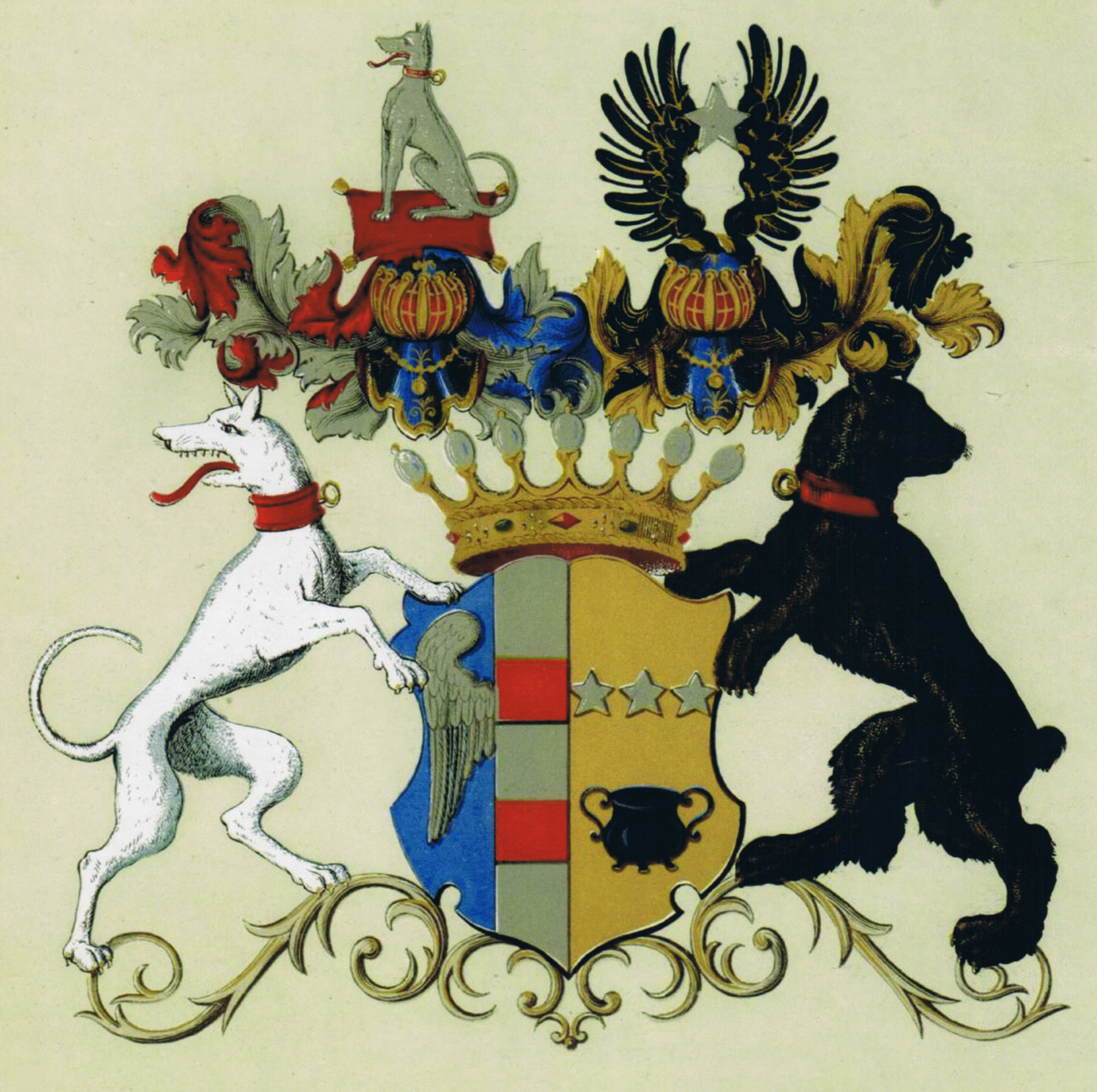
Coat of arms of Barons Ahlefeldt von Dehn, the German family branch, 1913

The Ahlefeldt von Dehn line was formally established in 1783. Carl Friedrich Ulrich von Ahlefeldt (1750–1829), a member of the Ahlefeldt family, married Sophie Charlotte Friederike von Dehn in 1776. The marriage resulted in a combined name and coat of arms, and Carl Friedrich Ulrich became the first member of the Ahlefeldt von Dehn line. The estate associated with this branch was Gut Ludwigsburg in Schleswig-Holstein.

The family became part of the nobility of the Kingdom of Prussia and was formally recognized by Prussian nobility authorities in 1913, confirming their baronial status as a distinct line. Even after the dissolution of the original fideicommiss (estate trust) in 1949, the family retained the name Ahlefeldt von Dehn, demonstrating the persistence of noble identity beyond estate ownership.

The family uses a combined coat of arms representing both the Ahlefeldt and von Dehn heritage. The arms of the branch date from the establishment of the union in 1783.

== Holdings ==
The Ahlefeldt family accumulated large holdings of land on the territories of today's Germany, France and Denmark:

- Olpenitz (at Kappeln)
- Saxtorf (at Schwansen)
- Königsförde-Lindau (at the Eider Canal)
- County of Langeland with Tranekær Castle
- Barony of Lehn
- Egeskov Castle
- Tranekær Castle, Eriksholm Castle, Fjællebro, Hjortholm, Møllerup, Skovsbo and Ulstrup Castle
- Réchicourt-le-Château, Imperial County.

== Gallery ==
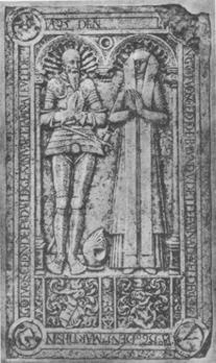
Detlev von Ahlefeldt (1480-1572)

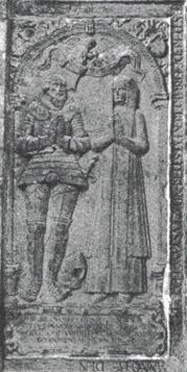
Benedikt von Ahlefeldt (1492-1513)

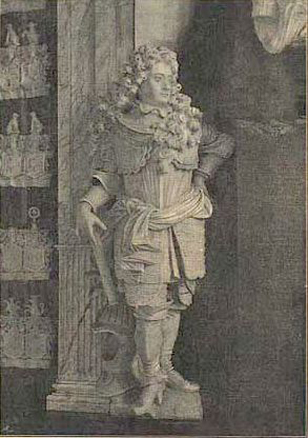
Hans von Ahlefeldt (1620-1694)

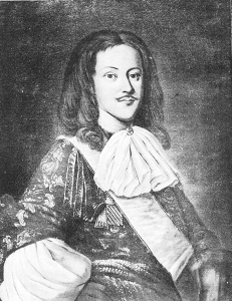
Burchard von Ahlefeldt (1634-1695)
