= Gråsten Palace =

Coordinates: 54°55′32″N 9°35′43″E

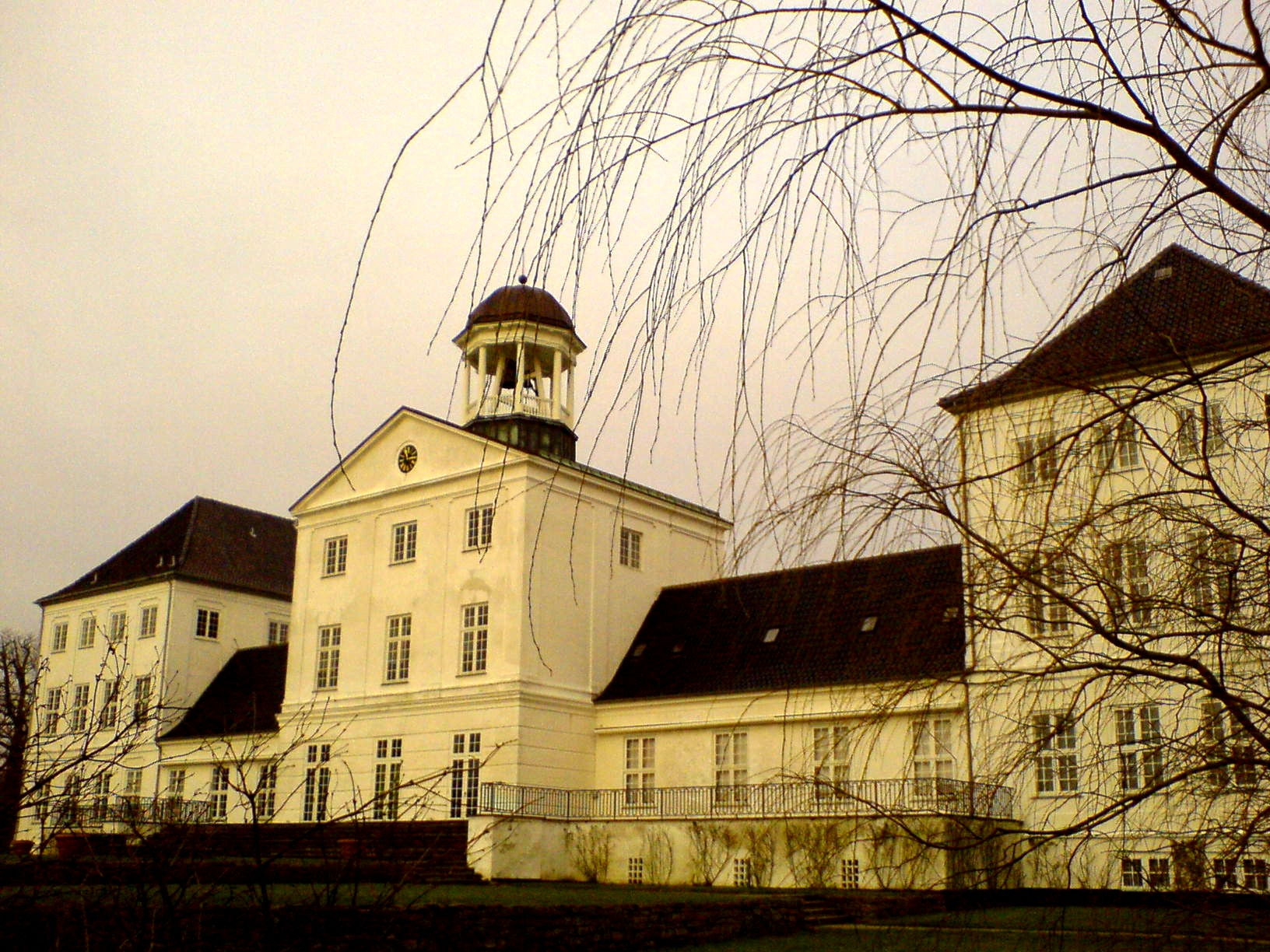
- Gråsten Palace seen from the courtyard.

General information
- Type: Palace
- Location: Gråsten, Denmark

Design and construction
- Architect: Johann Gottfried Rosenberg

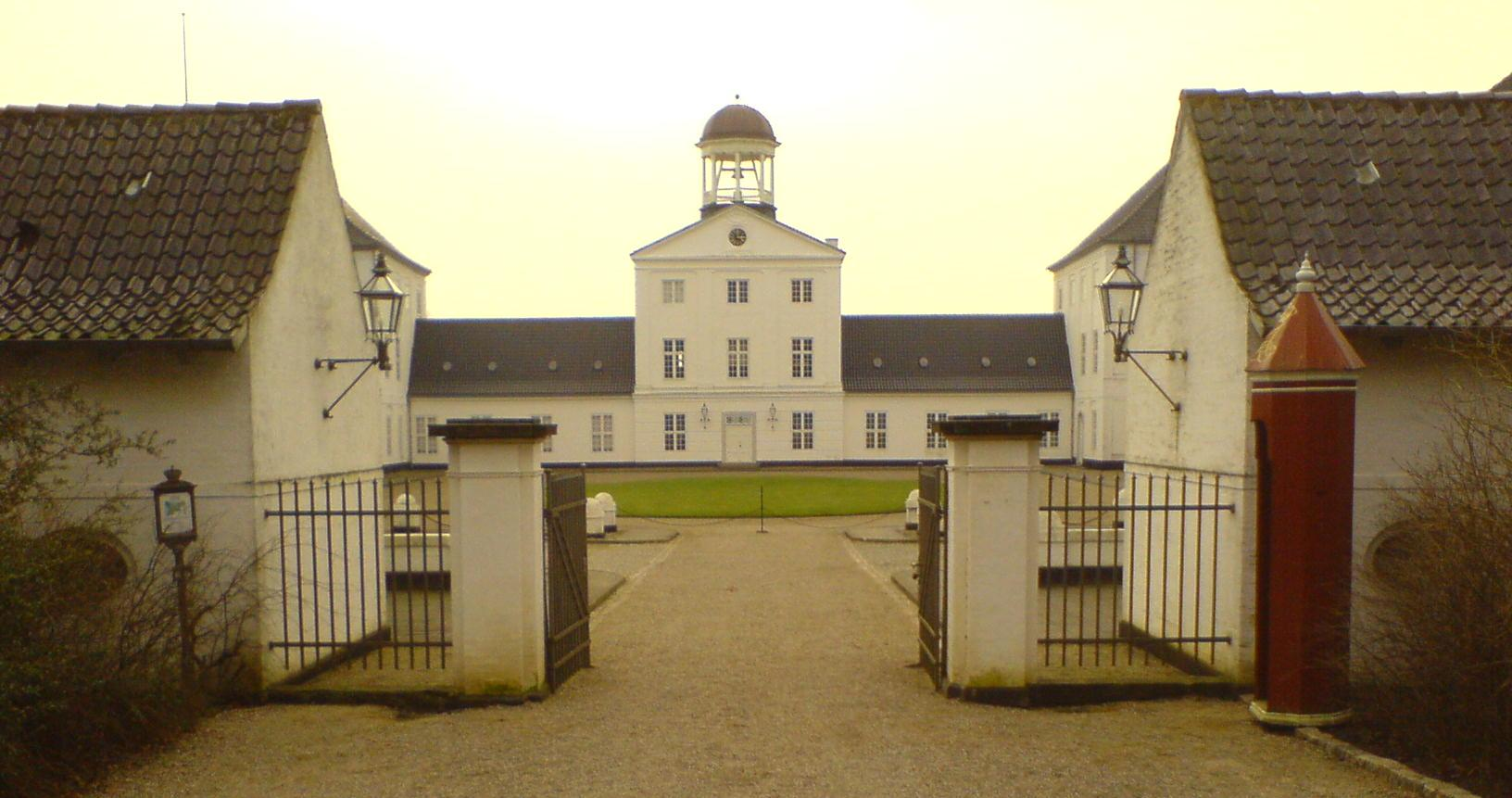
The palace seen from the gate.

Gråsten Palace (Danish: Gråsten Slot) is located at Gråsten in the Jutland region of southern Denmark. It is best known for being the summer residence of the Danish royal family. The main house has a modern, all-white facade, with Venetian doors opening onto sweeping, manicured lawns and gravel walkways. The grounds include a huge stables court.

== History ==
In its first edition, Gråsten was a small hunting castle built in the middle of the 16th century. The south wing of the present-day main house is believed to be built on the site of the second structure built in 1603 to replace a hunting lodge which had been destroyed in a fire in the middle of the 16th century. Under the ownership of Carl von Ahlefeldt, the second palace was demolished in favour of a grand Baroque style palace built in the years leading up to 1700. This third palace was however devastated by a fire in 1757 under the ownership of the then Duke of Augustenburg which only the Palace Chapel and two pavilions survived. The Duke then commissioned Johann Gottfried Rosenberg to rebuild the fourth and current palace in Rococo-style in 1759 – though considerably smaller than its former edition.

After about three and a half succeeding centuries of ownership by Danish nobles, Gråsten Slot was taken over by the State and extensively restored. In wake of their wedding in 1935, it was given as a summer residence to Crown Prince Frederik (later King Frederik IX) and his Swedish-born Crown Princess Ingrid (later Queen Ingrid) who especially adored the palace until her death in November 2000. It remains the summer residence of the Danish royal family.

In November 1845, Hans Christian Andersen visited Duke Christian August II at Gråsten Castle. Legend had it that Gråsten Palace was where Andersen wrote The Little Match Girl, during his visit. However, that is not the case. Andersen wrote it when he visited Augustenborg Palace.

== Landscape and Palace Chapel ==
The estate area has an area of 6.6 square kilometres (2.5 mi^{2}). The property includes a stables court, manicured lawns and gravel walkways.

Graasten Palace Chapel in the north wing is the only building remaining from the original baroque palace after a 1757 fire. Despite being badly damaged in the Second Schleswig War, the chapel is decorated with 80 paintings. The chapel has bilingual congregations, with German and Danish services to accommodate the mix of local culture.

== Owners ==
- –1559: Gregers Ahlefeldt (?-1559)
- 1559–1580: Hans Gregersen Ahlefeldt (1530-1580)
- 1580–1617: Gregers Ahlefeldt (1577-1617)
- 1617–1648: Hans Ahlefeldt (1605-1662), sold Gråsten to the first Duke of Glücksburg in 1648
- 1648–1662: Philip I of Schleswig-Holstein-Sonderburg-Glücksburg (1584-1663), sold Gråsten to Gregers Ahlefeldt's (1577-1617) grandson in 1662 after the Karl Gustav Wars (1657-1650)
- 1662–1686: Frederik Ahlefeldt (1632-1686), Grand Chancellor of Denmark (1676-1686) and son of Gregers Ahlefeldt's (1577-1617) daughter Birgitte (1600-1632)
- 1686–1708: Frederik Ahlefedt ("the Younger", 1662-1708)
- 1708–1722: Carl Ahlefeldt (1670-1725), inherited Gråsten from his childless older brother but died in bankruptcy in 1722 after which Gråsten was sold at an auction at Gottorp Castle in 1725
- 1725–1754: Christian August I of Augustenburg (1696-1754)
- 1754–1794: Frederik Christian I of Augustenburg (1721-1794)
- 1794–1814: Frederik Christian II of Augustenburg (1765-1814), brother-in-law of King Frederik VI of Denmark
- 1814–1852: Christian August II of Augustenburg (1798–1869), grandson of King Christian VII of Denmark, lost Gråsten after the First Schleswig War
- 1852–1862: The Danish state
- 1862–1864: Count Adam Gottlob Moltke-Huitfeldt (1798-1876), sold Gråsten back to the Augustenburg-family after the Second Schleswig War in 1864
- 1864–1865: Prince Christian of Augustenburg (1831-1917), later son-in-law of Queen Victoria, sold Gråsten to his first cousin in 1865
- 1865–1884: Frederik Christian August of Augustenburg ("Friedrich der Achte", 1829-1880), pretender to the duchy of Schleswig-Holstein
- 1884–1921: Ernst Günther II of Schleswig-Holstein (1863-1921), died childless in 1921
- 1921–1935: The Danish state
- 1935–: The Danish royal family receives the right to use Gråsten and it has been the family's summer residence ever since
