= Johann Gottfried Rosenberg =

Danish architect

Johann Gottfried Rosenberg (late 1709 - 4 June 1776) was a German-Danish architect working in the Rococo style.

== Biography ==
Johann Gottfried Rosenberg's exact date of birth is not known but he was christened on 20 October 1709 in Woldegk in the duchy of Mecklenburg-Strelitz. In the 1730s, he was active in Schleswig-Holstein and from 1740 in Denmark where he settled in 1752. His early works include the Margård manor house on the island of Funen which relies on French country house architecture for inspiration.

He collaborated with Nicolai Eigtved on a number of projects in Copenhagen in the early 1750s, including the Dehn, Bernstorff and Berckentin Mansions in Bredgade in the Frederiksstaden neighbourhood which was under development around that time. North of the city, on the shore of Lake Bagsværd, he designed the Frederiksdal pavilion.

In 1760, Rosenborg returned to Schleswig-Holstein to assume a position as master builder. His most important works there are Gråsten Palace (1758–59) and Augustenborg Castle (attributed, 1770–76). In 1771 he finished the Royal Danish Mint in Altona (Elbe) near Hamburg.

== Gallery ==
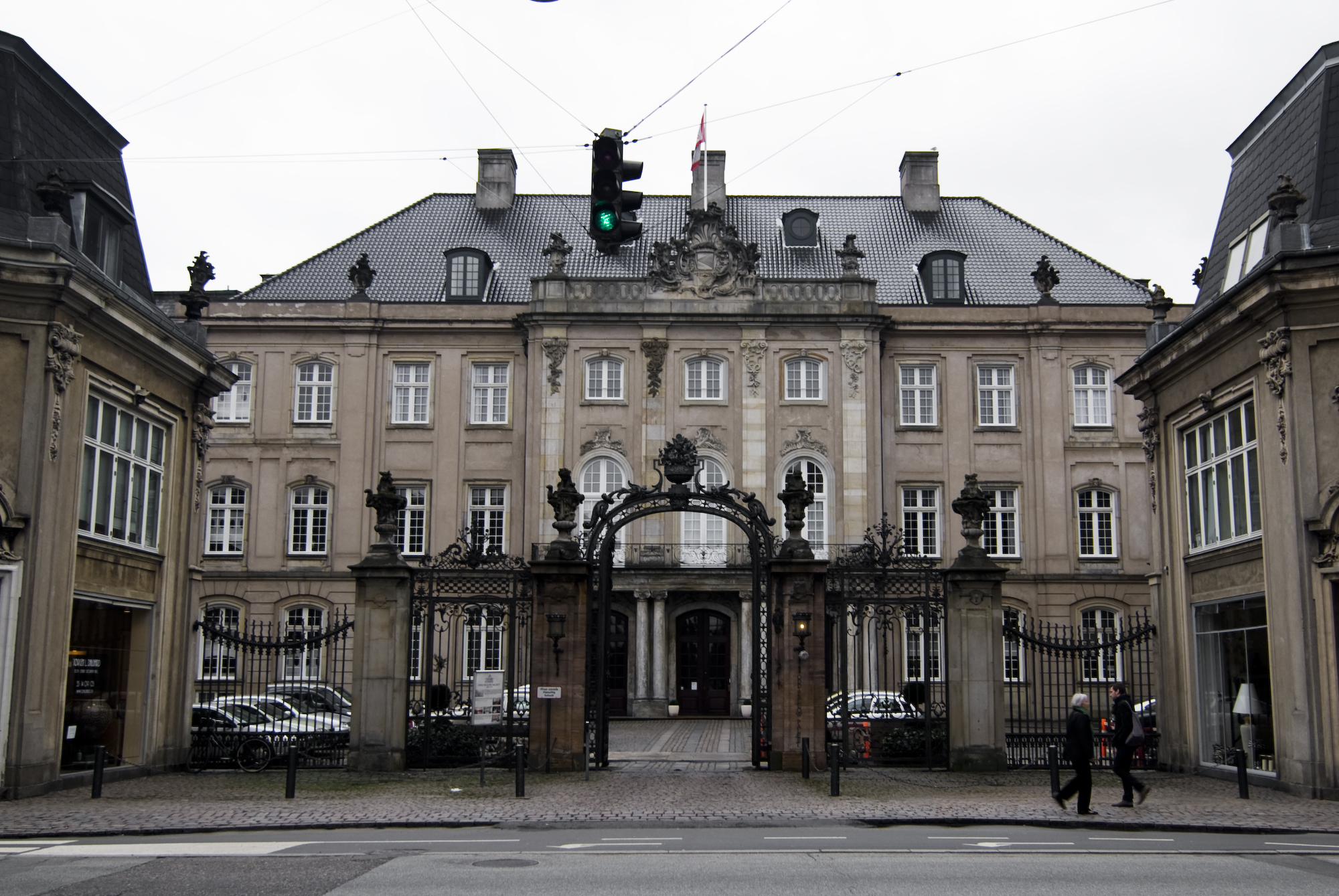
Berckentin Mansion (1751–55

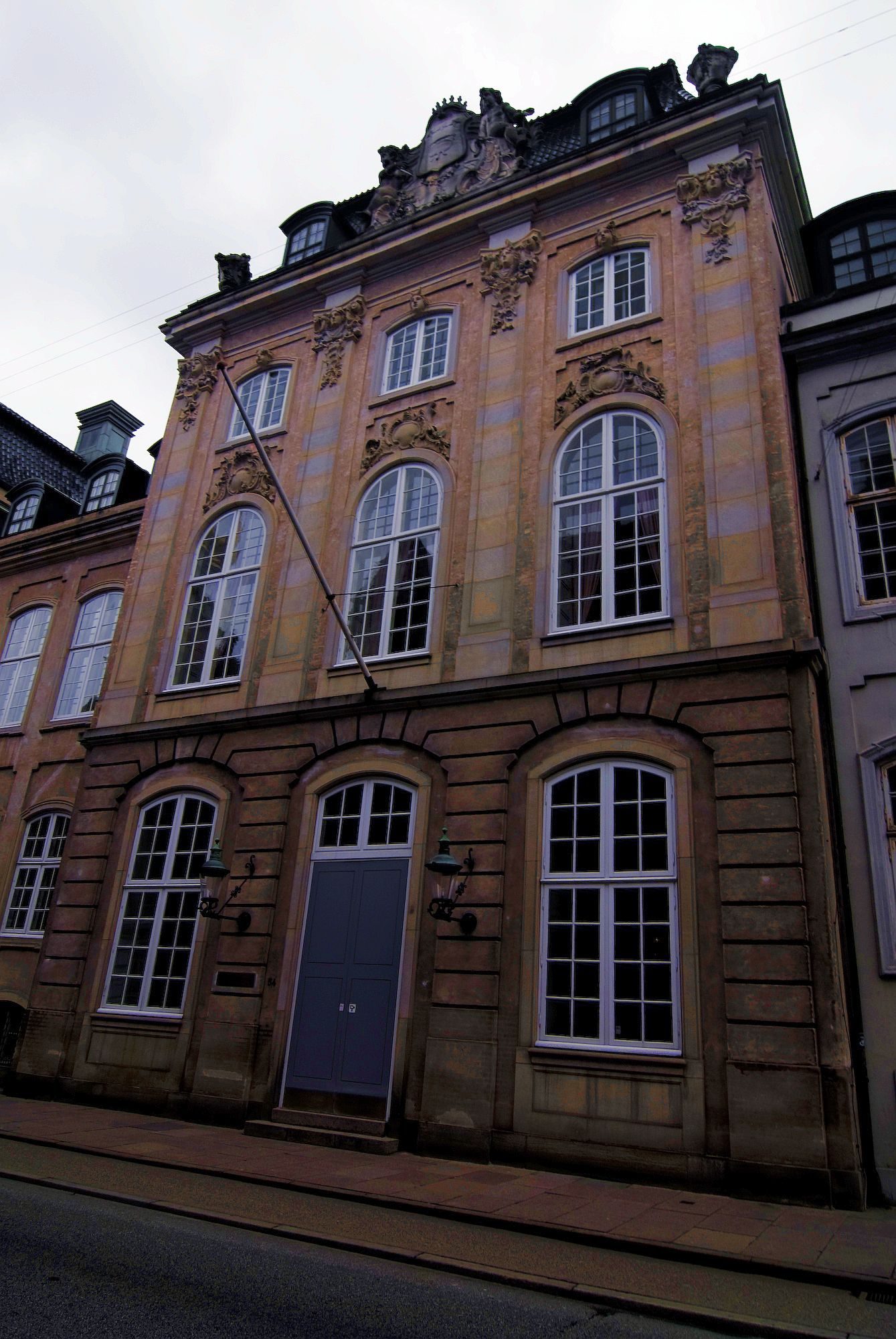
Dehn Mansion (1751–55

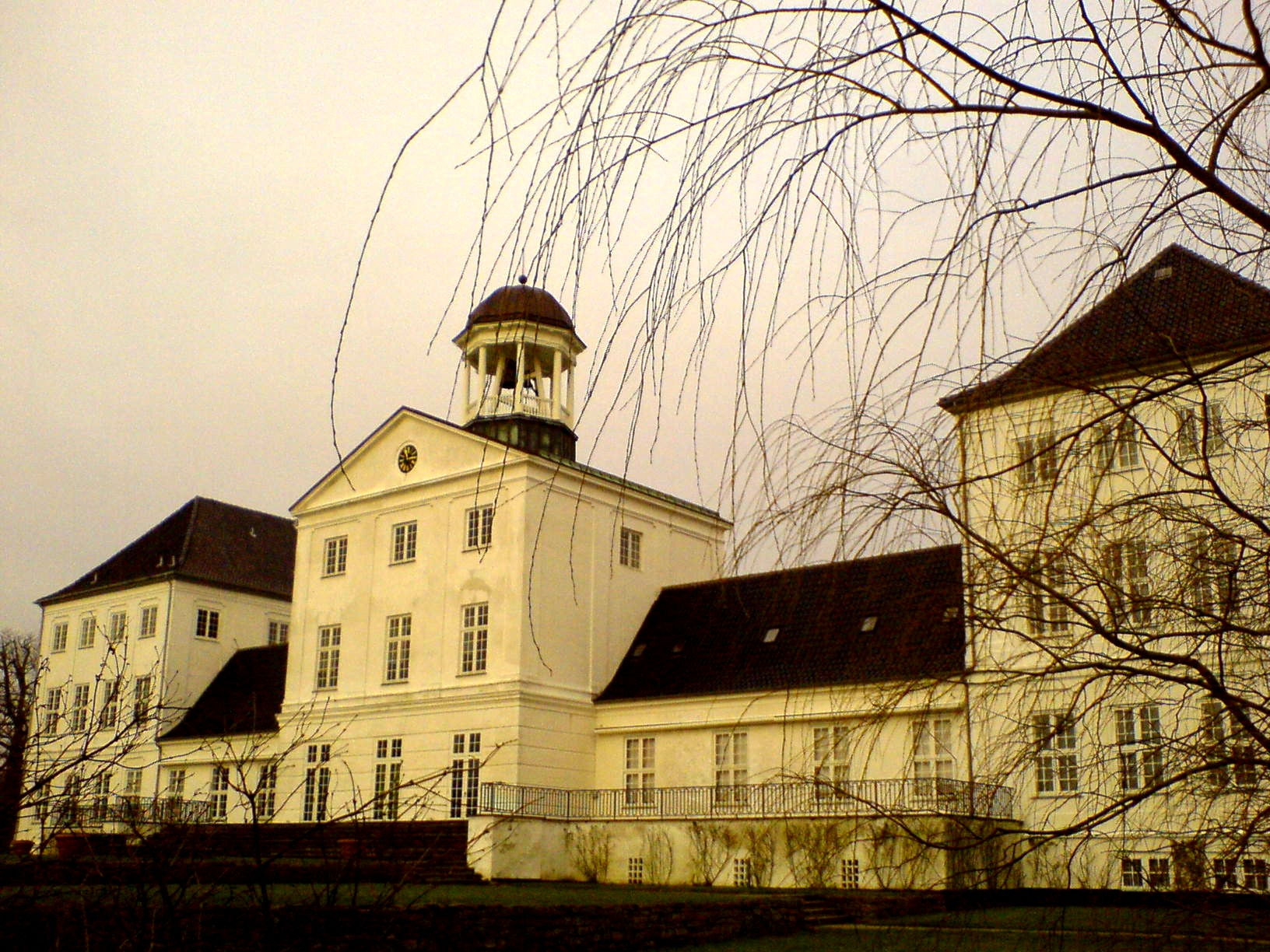
Gråsten Palace (1758–59)

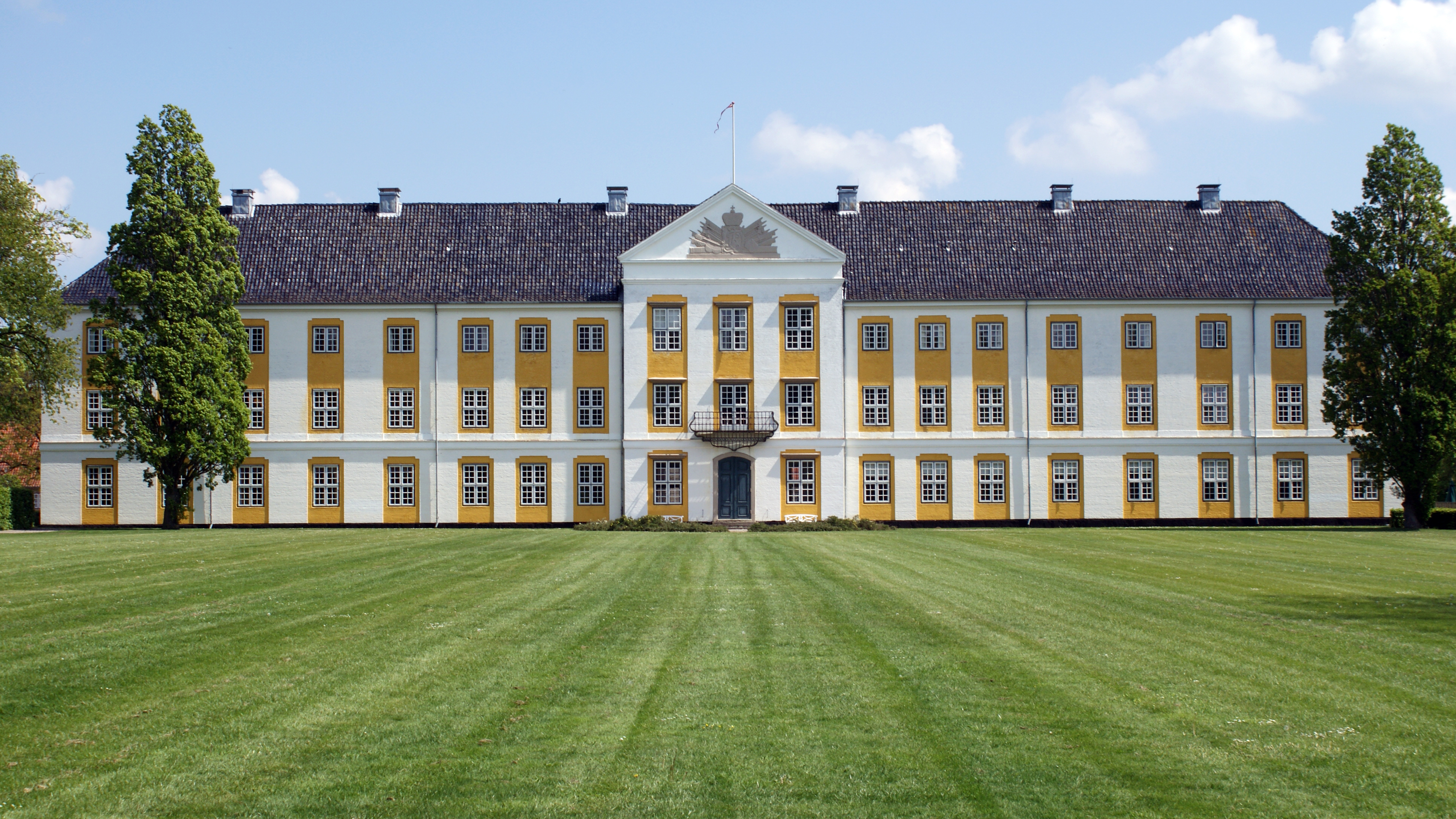
Augustenborg Castle (1770–76).

== See also ==
- Architecture of Denmark
