= Listed buildings in Langeland Municipality =

List of buildings in Langeland Municipality

This is a list of listed buildings in Langeland Municipality, Denmark.

== Listed buildings ==
=== 5900 Rudkøbing ===
Listing name	Image	Location	Coordinates	Description
Bymøllens Møllegård		Rue 1, 5900 Rudkøbing	54°56′6.14″N 10°42′39.87″E	Protected 1959.
Bymøllens Møllegård		Rue 1, 5900 Rudkøbing	54°56′6.14″N 10°42′39.87″E	Protected 1959.
Hennetvedvej 19		Hennetvedvej 19, 5900 Rudkøbing	54°50′59.62″N 10°44′10.35″E	Protected 1985.
Hestehandlergården		Torvet 6B, 5900 Rudkøbing	54°56′10.03″N 10°42′38.55″E	
Hestehandlergården		Rue Stræde 2D, 5900 Rudkøbing, Langeland	54°56′8.75″N 10°42′37.93″E	Protected 1987.
Hestehandlergården		Torvet 6, 5900 Rudkøbing	54°56′9.99″N 10°42′38.31″E	Vestre udlænge.
Hestehandlergården		Torvet 6, 5900 Rudkøbing	54°56′9.99″N 10°42′38.31″E	Vestre sidehus..
Hestehandlergården		Torvet 6, 5900 Rudkøbing	54°56′9.99″N 10°42′38.31″E	Peat oven and "coal basket"..
Hestehandlergården		Torvet 6, 5900 Rudkøbing	54°56′9.99″N 10°42′38.31″E	Warehouse (magasinhus).
Hestehandlergården		Torvet 6, 5900 Rudkøbing	54°56′9.99″N 10°42′38.31″E	Østre sidehus.
Hestehandlergården		Torvet 6, 5900 Rudkøbing	54°56′9.99″N 10°42′38.31″E	Outbuilding.
Kågård		Kågårdsvej 3, 5900 Rudkøbing	54°50′49.52″N 10°46′52.88″E	Protected 2012. Four protected buildings.
Lindelse Mill, Phønix Mill		Møllebanken 1, 5900 Rudkøbing	54°52′3.89″N 10°44′25.98″E	Wingmill from 1818.
Lindelse Mill, Phønix Mill		Møllebanken 1, 5900 Rudkøbing	54°52′3.89″N 10°44′25.98″E	L-shaped residential building.
Lindelse Mill, Phønix Mill		Møllebanken 1, 5900 Rudkøbing	54°52′3.89″N 10°44′25.98″E	Magazine building..
Nørregade 12-14		Nørregade 12A, 5900 Rudkøbing	54°56′13.6″N 10°42′40.83″E	
Nørregade 12-14		Nørregade 14, 5900 Rudkøbing	54°56′14.53″N 10°42′42.4″E	
Rudkøbing Town Hall; Rudkøbing Rådhus		Torvet 1A, 5900 Rudkøbing	54°56′11.24″N 10°42′35.68″E	Protected 1977.
Rudkøbing Bymølle		Rue 1A, 5900 Rudkøbing	54°56′5.98″N 10°42′39.58″E	Protected 1959.
Rudkøbing Pharmacy		Brogade 15, 5900 Rudkøbing	54°56′12.86″N 10°42′28.85″E	Main building. Protected 1978.
Rudkøbing Pharmacy		Brogade 15, 5900 Rudkøbing	54°56′12.86″N 10°42′28.85″E	Western side wing.>
Rudkøbing Pharmacy		Brogade 15B, 5900 Rudkøbing	54°56′12.18″N 10°42′29.07″E	Eastern wing with pavilion.
Rudkøbing Rectory; Rudkøbing Præstegård		Østergade 2, 5900 Rudkøbing	54°56′10.19″N 10°42′40.04″E	Protected 1919.
Sankt Ansgarius Stiftelse		Brogade 14, 5900 Rudkøbing	54°56′12.49″N 10°42′31.48″E	Protected 1939.
Sidsel Bagers Gade 11		Sidsel Bagers Gade 11, 5900 Rudkøbing	54°56′12.3″N 10°42′40.65″E	
Skovsgård Mill; Skovsgård Mølle		Påøvej 1, 5900 Rudkøbing	54°50′20.07″N 10°44′37.14″E	Protected 1983.
Smedegade 3: Glads Legat		Smedegade 3, 5900 Rudkøbing	54°56′13.16″N 10°42′36.25″E	Protected 1945.
Smedegade 5		Smedegade 5, 5900 Rudkøbing	54°56′13.3″N 10°42′35.79″E	Protected 1955.
Smedegade 7: Håndværkssvendenes Rejse- & Sygeforening		Smedegade 7, 5900 Rudkøbing	54°56′13.45″N 10°42′35.19″E	Protected 1955.
Smedegade 9; Madam Schmidts Legat		Smedegade 9, 5900 Rudkøbing	54°56′13.55″N 10°42′34.72″E	Protected 1955.
Sprøjtehuset		Grønnegade 13, 5900 Rudkøbing	54°56′13.03″N 10°42′36.87″E	Protected 1945.
Søvertorp		Søvertorpvej 2, 5900 Rudkøbing	54°54′53.25″N 10°46′19.2″E	Protected 1988.
Søvertorp		Søvertorpvej 2, 5900 Rudkøbing	54°54′53.25″N 10°46′19.2″E	Protected 1988.
Old Mayor House; Den Gamle Borgmestergård		Nørregade 21, 5900 Rudkøbing	54°56′15.51″N 10°42′43.91″E	Protected 1919.
Old Mayor House; Den Gamle Borgmestergård		Strandgade 3, 5900 Rudkøbing	54°56′16.23″N 10°42′43.49″E	
Østergade 24		Østergade 24, 5900 Rudkøbing	54°56′8.21″N 10°42′46.8″E	Protected 1919.

=== 5932 Humble ===
Listing name	Image	Location	Coordinates	Description
Broløkke		Hedevejen 33, 5932 Humble	54°46′8.53″N 10°43′19.3″E	Protected 1918.
Hjortholm		Haveskovvej 17, 5932 Humble		Neoclassical main building from 1789.
Hjortholm		Haveskovvej 17, 5932 Humble		Kavalerfløjen: Half-timbered building from c. 1675.
Church barn by Tryggelev Church; Kirkeladen ved Tryggelev Kirke		Tryggelev 27, 5932 Humble	54°48′13.07″N 10°42′7.95″E	Protected 1980.

=== 5935 Bagenkop ===
Listing name	Image	Location	Coordinates	Description
Kelds Nor Lighthouse		Rathvej 8A, 5935 Bagenkop	54°43′52.88″N 10°43′17.53″E	Lighthouse from 1895.
Kelds Nor Lighthouse		Rathvej 8A, 5935 Bagenkop	54°43′52.41″N 10°43′17.61″E	Fyrmesterbolig.
Kelds Nor Lighthouse		Rathvej 8A, 5935 Bagenkop	54°43′52.41″N 10°43′17.61″E	Maskinbygning from 1895.
Kelds Nor Lighthouse		Rathvej 8A, 5935 Bagenkop	54°43′52.41″N 10°43′17.61″E	Oliehuset.
Kelds Nor Lighthouse		Rathvej 8A, 5935 Bagenkop	54°43′52.41″N 10°43′17.61″E	Outbuilding from 1895.
Kelds Nor Lighthouse		Røjlevej 8B, 5935 Bagenkop	54°45′46.66″N 10°42′32.94″E	Fyrpasser- og assistentbolig.
Søndenbro Andelsmejeri, bestyrerbolig		Røjlevej 8A, 5935 Bagenkop		Dairy.
Søndenbro Andelsmejeri		Røjlevej 8B, 5935 Bagenkop		Dairy.

=== 5943 Strynø ===
Listing name	Image	Location	Coordinates	Description
Strynø Mill		Møllevejen 30, 5943 Strynø	54°54′15.96″N 10°35′44.84″E	Protected 1984.
Strynø School		Nørrevej 1, 5943 Strynø	54°54′19.77″N 10°36′30.01″E	School building from 1905.
Strynø School		Nørrevej 1, 5943 Strynø	54°54′19.77″N 10°36′30.01″E	Outbuilding from 1905.

=== 5953 Tranekær ===
Listing name	Image	Location	Coordinates	Description
Bjerreby Mill		Bygaden 1A, 5953 Tranekær	54°57′17.22″N 10°47′13.32″E	Windmill from 1819..
Bjerreby Mill		Bygaden 1A, 5953 Tranekær	54°57′17.18″N 10°47′17.17″E	Farm building..
Bjerreby Mill		Bygaden 1B, 5953 Tranekær	54°57′17.18″N 10°47′17.17″E	Half-timbered house for the miller..
Bjerreby Mill		Bygaden 1B, 5953 Tranekær	54°57′17.18″N 10°47′17.17″E	Stable (north wing).
Bjerreby Mill		Bygaden 1B, 5953 Tranekær	54°57′17.18″N 10°47′17.17″E	Northern outbuilding.
Egeløkke		Egeløkkevej 3, 5953 Tranekær	55°2′39.36″N 10°51′31.57″E	Main building. Protected 1979.
Rene's House		Slotsgade 88, 5953 Tranekær	55°0′10.77″N 10°51′21.19″E	Protected 2007.
Rene's House		Slotsgade 88, 5953 Tranekær	55°0′10.77″N 10°51′21.19″E	Protected 2007.
Steensgaard		Steensgårdsvej 7, 5953 Tranekær	55°6′35.58″N 10°55′1.5″E	Protected 1985.
Tranekær Manor		Slotsgade 82, 5953 Tranekær, Langeland	55°0′5.19″N 10°51′17.73″E	Barn. Protected 1918.
Tranekær Manor		Slotsgade 84, 5953 Tranekær, Langeland	55°0′7.24″N 10°51′18.19″E	Side wing.
Tranekær Manor		Slotsgade 86, 5953 Tranekær, Langeland	55°0′6.35″N 10°51′21.81″E	Side wing.
Tranekær Manor		Slotsgade 86, 5953 Tranekær, Langeland	55°0′6.35″N 10°51′21.81″E	Side wing.
Tranekær Manor		Slotsgade 86, 5953 Tranekær, Langeland	55°0′6.35″N 10°51′21.81″E	Castle.
Tranekær Castle Mill		Lejbøllevej 3, 5953 Tranekær	55°0′39.86″N 10°51′34.89″E	Protected 1959.
Tranekær Old School		Slotsgade 20, 5953 Tranekær	54°59′50.4″N 10°50′43.43″E	Protected 1918.
