= Tranekær Manor =

Building on Langeland, Denmark

Tranekær
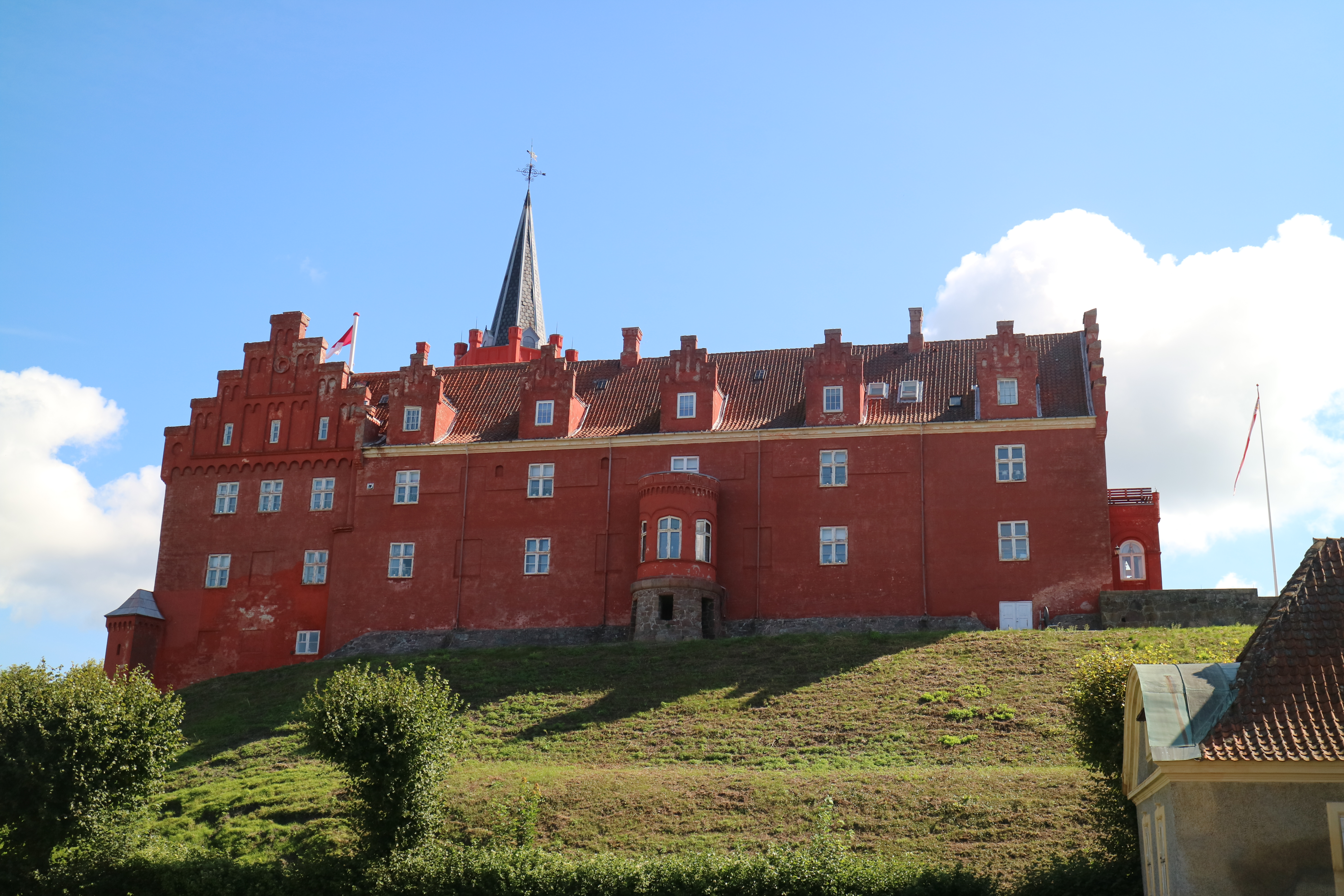

General information
- Location: Slotsgade 82-88, Langeland; 4490 Jerslev Sjælland, Denmark
- Coordinates: 55°00′5.47″N 10°51′21.34″E

Tranekær Manor (Danish: Tranekær Gods) is a manor house and estate on Langeland, Denmark. The red-plastered, two-winged main building is perched on a small hill on the northern outskirts of the village Tranekær. It originates in a four-winged Medieval castle of which the south and east wings were demolished in the 1720s. It owes its current appearance to a comprehensive renovation undertaken by the architect Niels Sigfred Nebelong in 1859–1863. The main building, a theatre building, a stable, a carriage house and a garden pavilion were listed on the Danish registry of protected buildings and places in 1918. Tranekær has belonged to members of the Ahlefeldt family since 1659.

== History ==
=== Crown land ===
Tranekær traves its history back to Valdemar II (1179–1241), who gave his son, Abel, Langeland and the newly built castle Trænekær. In 1287, Abel's grandson Valdemar IV of Slesvig handed over Tranekær to his brother Erik Eriksen, whose widow Sophie kept the estate until 1326.

In 1358, Tranekær was conquered by Valdemar IV (1320–1375), and in the following years the estate was managed by changing fiefholders. Before his coronation, King John (1455–1513) was fiefholder of Tranekær for a number of years, and after his ascension to the throne in 1455, he ceded it to Queen Christina of Saxony, who ruled over it until her death in 1521.

Tranekær was up through the 17th century attached to Nyborg county on several occasions. Most of the fiefholders resided in Nyborg during these periods.

=== Ahlefeldt family ===
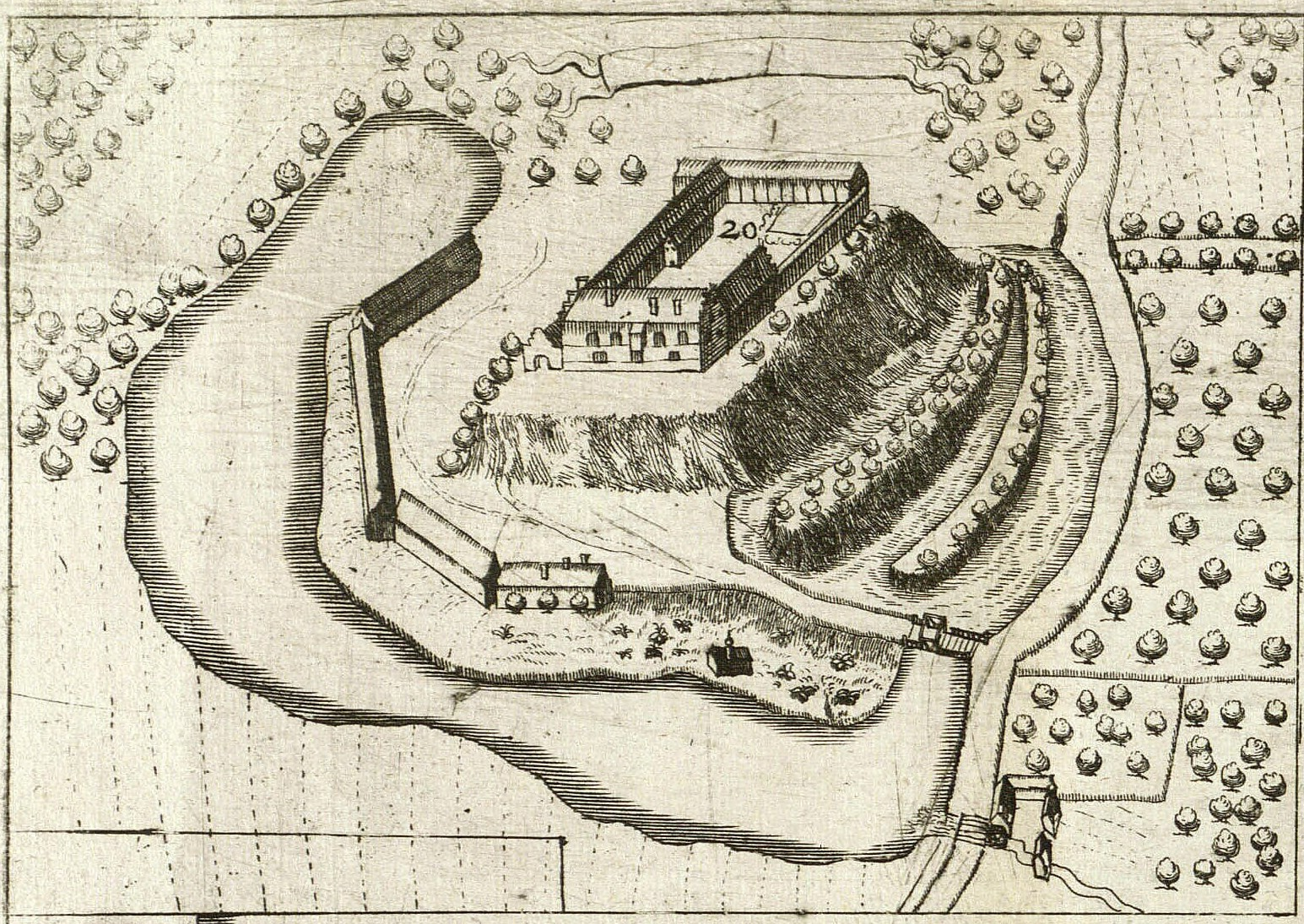
Tranekær in 1677.

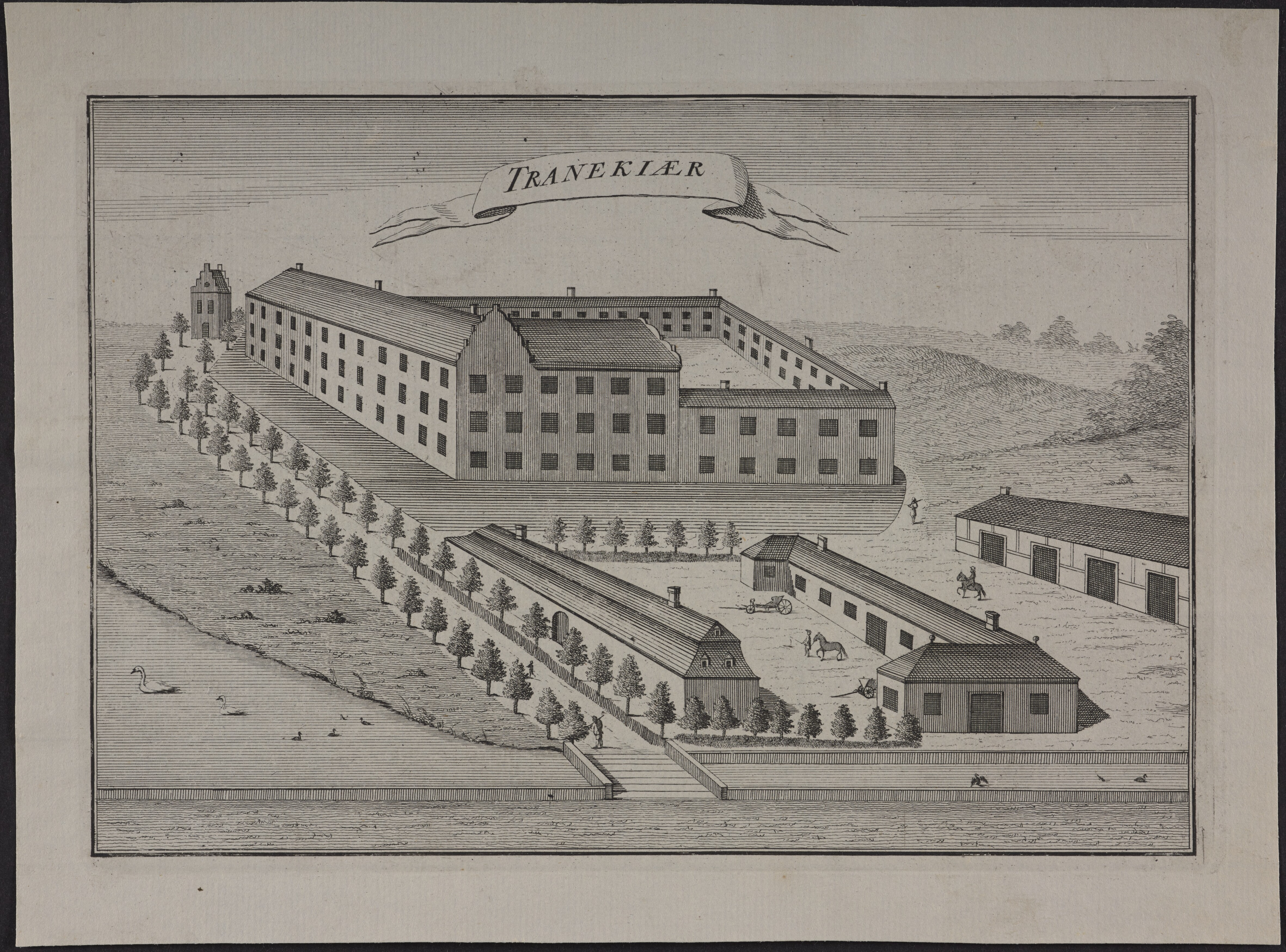
Tranekær.

In 1645, Christian IV (1577–1648) transferred Tranekær to Christian Rantzau ad de facto payment on a loan that he had received. Rantzau, who was governor of the duchies, transferred Tranekær and the associated mortgage deed to his son-in-law, Frederik Ahlefeldt, in 1659. Tranekær was part of Margrethe Dorothea Rantzau's dowry. Rantzau had opposed the marriage, and the young couple had therefore chosen to enter into a secret marriage in a village church. Queen Sophie Amalie, who was Frederik Ahlefeldt's protector, managed to reconcile Rantzau and the newly married couple.

Frederik Ahlefeldt was one of the favourites of Christian V. When he was created a count in 1672, Tranekær was included in the new county of Langeland.

After Frederik Ahlefelt's death in 1686, the county passed to his son, Frederik Ahlefeldt. He did not spend much time at Tranekær, as he, like his father, was the governor of the duchies. Frederik Ahlefeldt died childless in 1708. The county therefore passed to his uncle Carl von Ahlefeldt, who was married to Ulrikke Antoinette Danneskiold-Laurvig. He also owned a mansion on Kongens Nytorv in Copenhagen. He was heavily in debt at the time of his death.

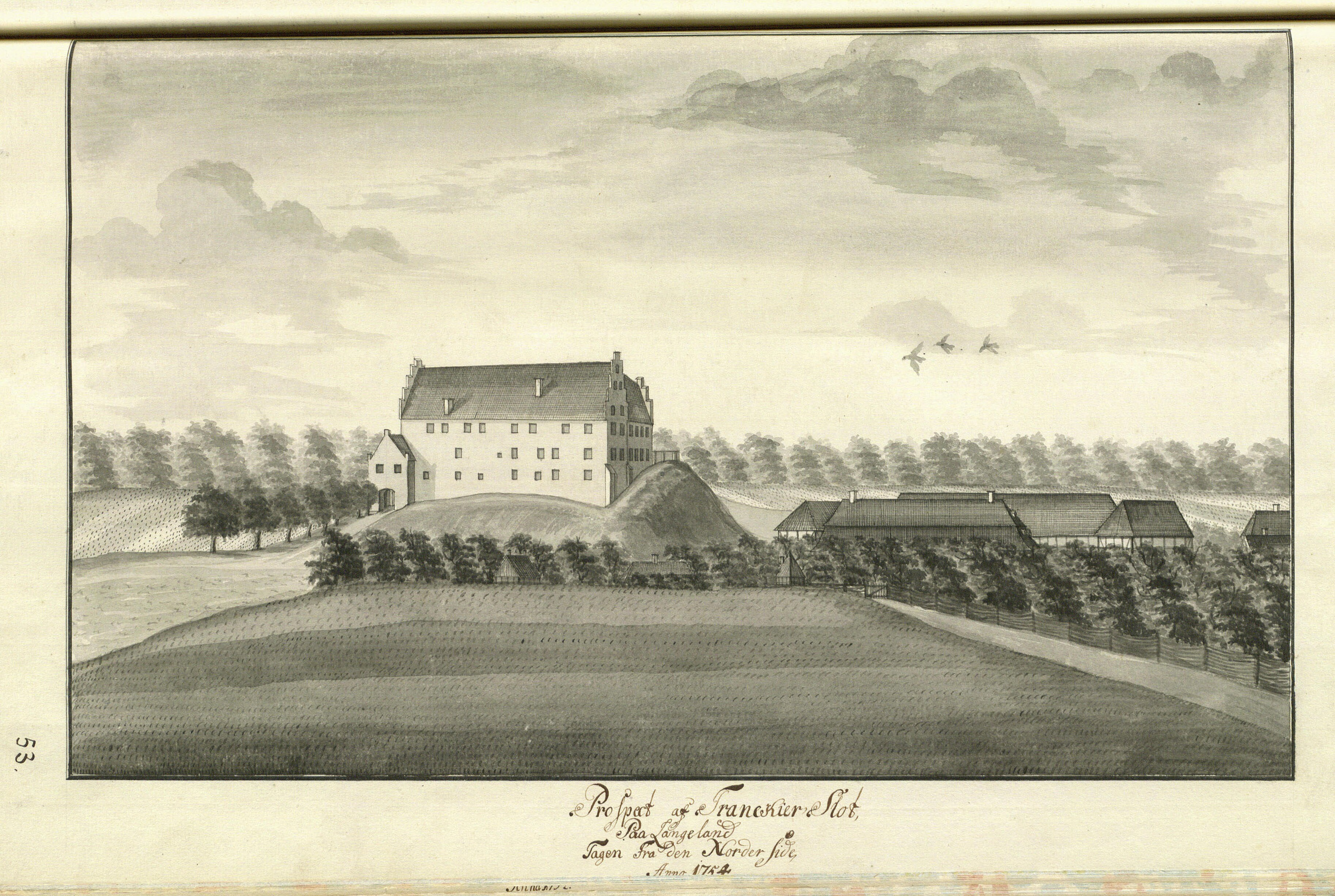
Tranekær in 1754.

Carl Ahlefeldt was succeeded by his son, Frederik Ahlefeldt, who had to spend his first years as count settling his father's debts. His success was so great that he also considerably expanded the land holdings. In 1765, he turned his holdings into a so-called stamhus (family trust) with the effect that they could neither be sold, pledged a divided between heirs.

Upon Frederik Ahlefeldt's death in 1773, his son Christian Ahlefeldt took over the county. In 1785 he was awarded the county of Laurvig in Norway after his grandmother and subsequently took the name Ahlefeldt-Laurvig. His son Frederik Ahlefeldt-Laurvig ceded the county of Laurvig to the king in 1805, but kept the name.

Frederik Ahlefeldt-Laurvig, who inherited the county of Langeland in 1791, embarked on implementing the agricultural reforms. He moved the farms out if the villages, redistributed the land and discontinued the mandatory labour (hoveri) that the tenant farmers had to contribute with on the land that belonged to the manor. At Tranekær's home farm (ladegård), he took in agricultural students and taught them the theory and practice of agriculture. Later he also established a teachers' seminary in Tranekær. In addition, he founded a sugar factory as well as a factory for agricultural machinery.

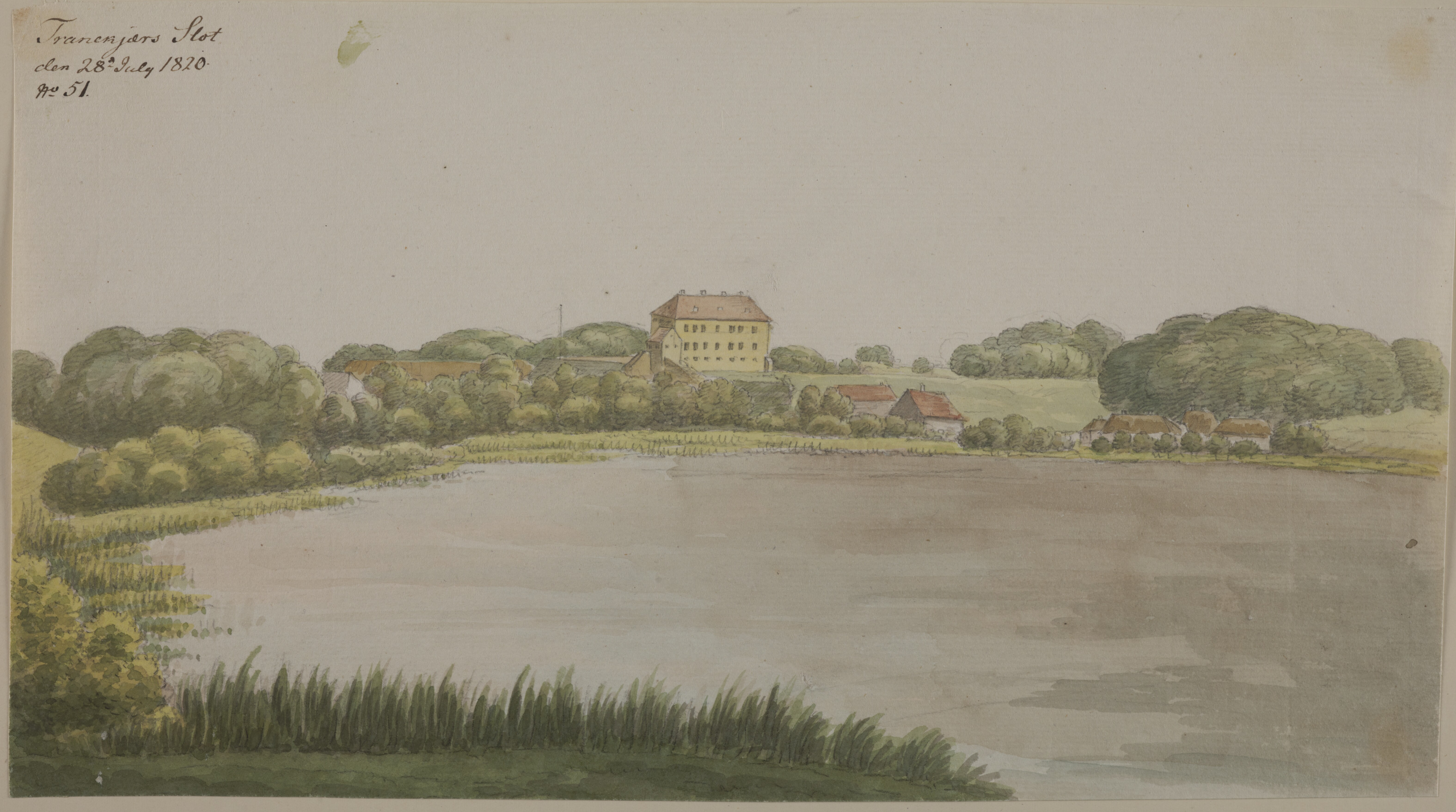
Tranekær seen on a drawing by Ole Jørgen Rawert, 28 July 1820.

Frederik Ahlefeldt-Laurvig had financial problems at the time of his death in 1832. His nephew Christian Johan Frederik Ahlefeldt-Laurvig, who was the closest heir, considered rejecting the inheritance due to the county's poor finances. However, he decided to take over the county and shortly afterwards held a public auction at which all the furnishings except the family portraits were put up for sale.

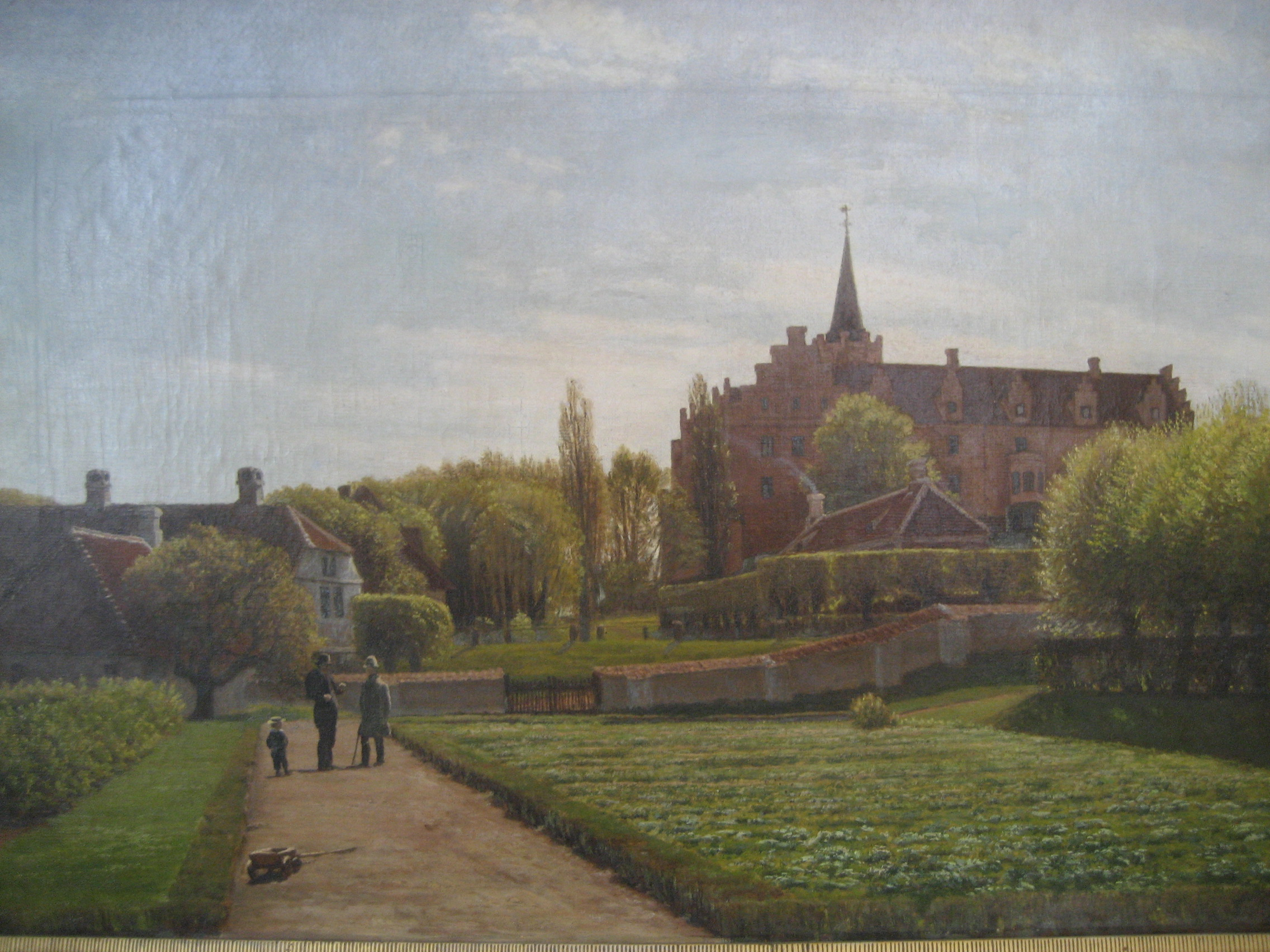
Tranekær painted by Godtfred Rump, 1879.

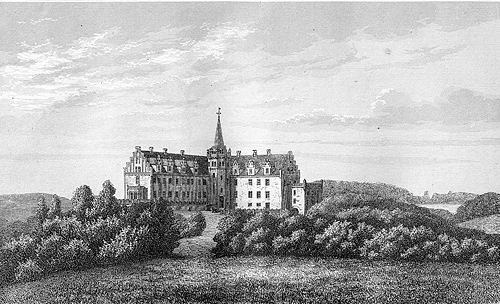
Tranekær

Upon his death in 1865, the county passed to his son Frederik Ludvig Vilhelm Ahlefeldt-Laurvig, who sold most of the tenant farms as freeholdings. He was succeeded in 1889 by his son Christian Johan Frederik Ahlefeldt-Laurvig, who for many years was a member of the Landsting. Christian Ahlefeldt-Laurvig died in 1917 and his son Frederik Ludvig Vilhem Ahlefeldt-Laurvig inherited the county. In 1928, as a result of the so-called lensafkøsningslov, the county of Langeland passed to freehold.

Frederik Ahlefeldt-Laurvig died in 1947, and Tranekær passed to his nephew Kai Benedict Ahlefeldt-Laurvig, who carried out an extensive renovation of the farm. Tranekær is still in the family's possession and has been owned by Christian Benedict Ahlefeldt-Laurvig since 1995.

== Architecture ==
The main building owes its current appearance to a renovation undertaken by N- Sn. Nebelong in 1859–1863. It is a red-lastered two storeys tall two-winged building. It is constructed on a foundation of field stone that compensates for the uneven site. The crow-stepped gables were added by Nebelong. He also lengthened the west wing.

The theatre building and stable were most likely designed by Andreas Kirkerup.

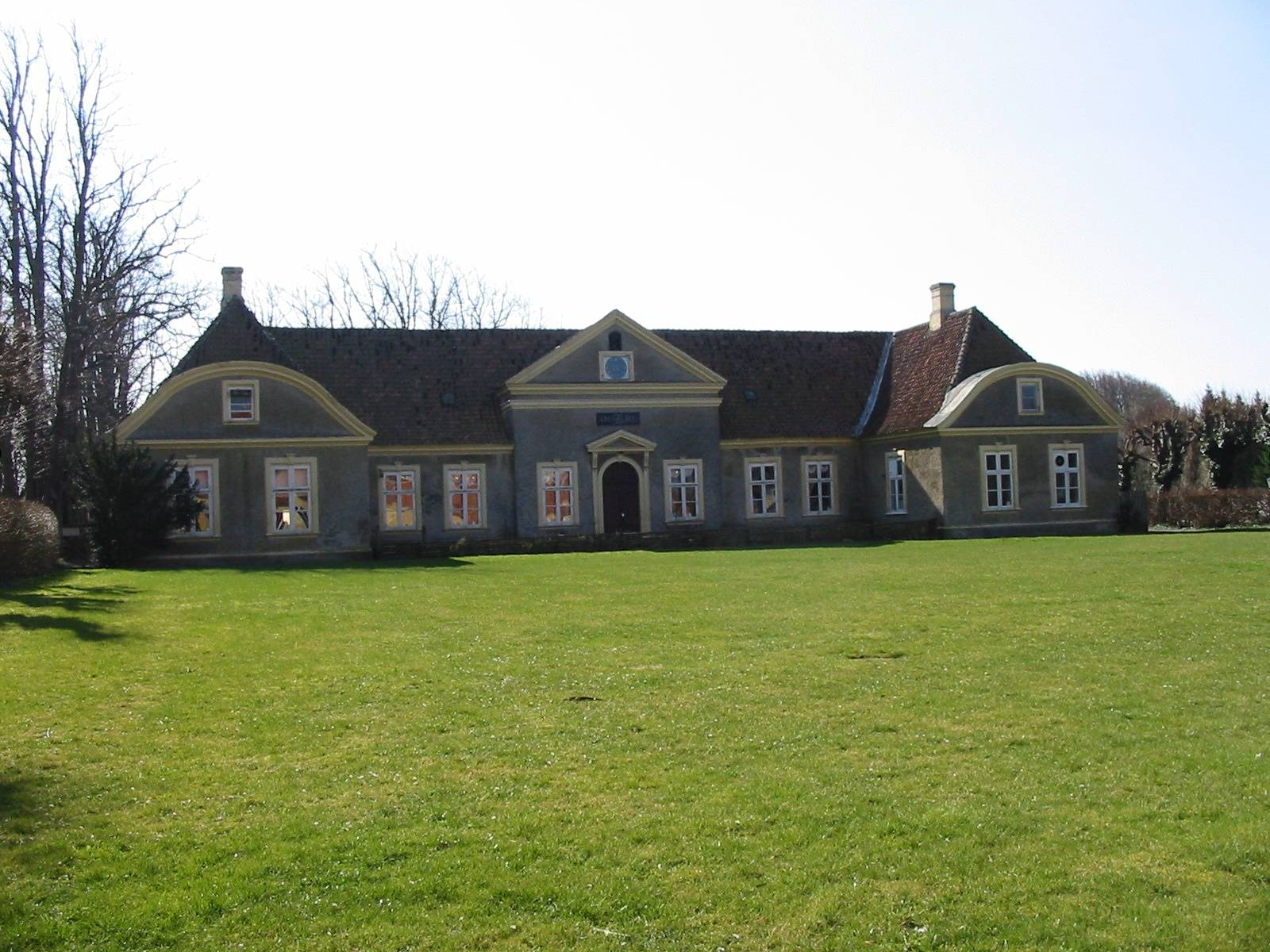
Herskabsstalden

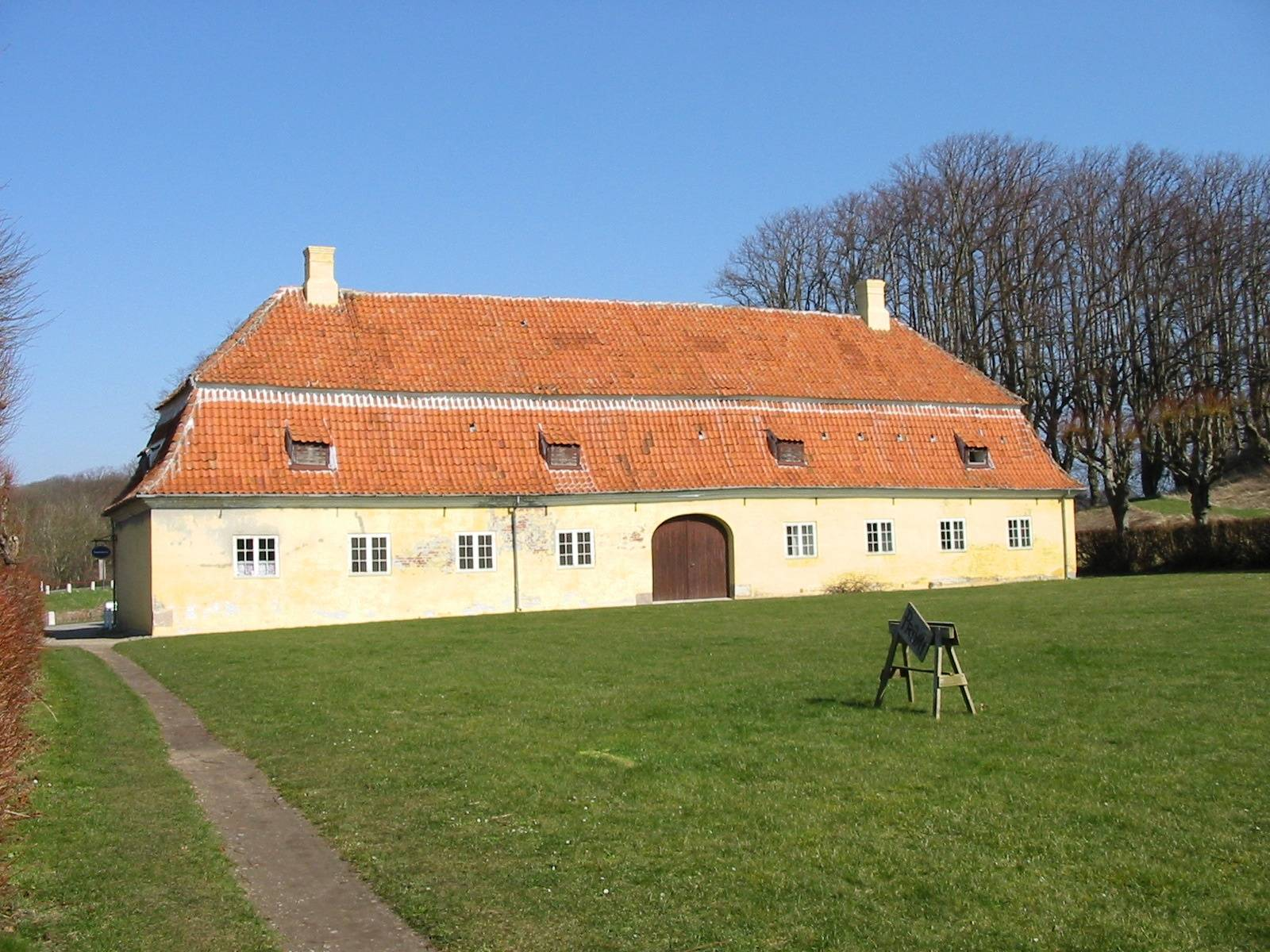
The theatre building.

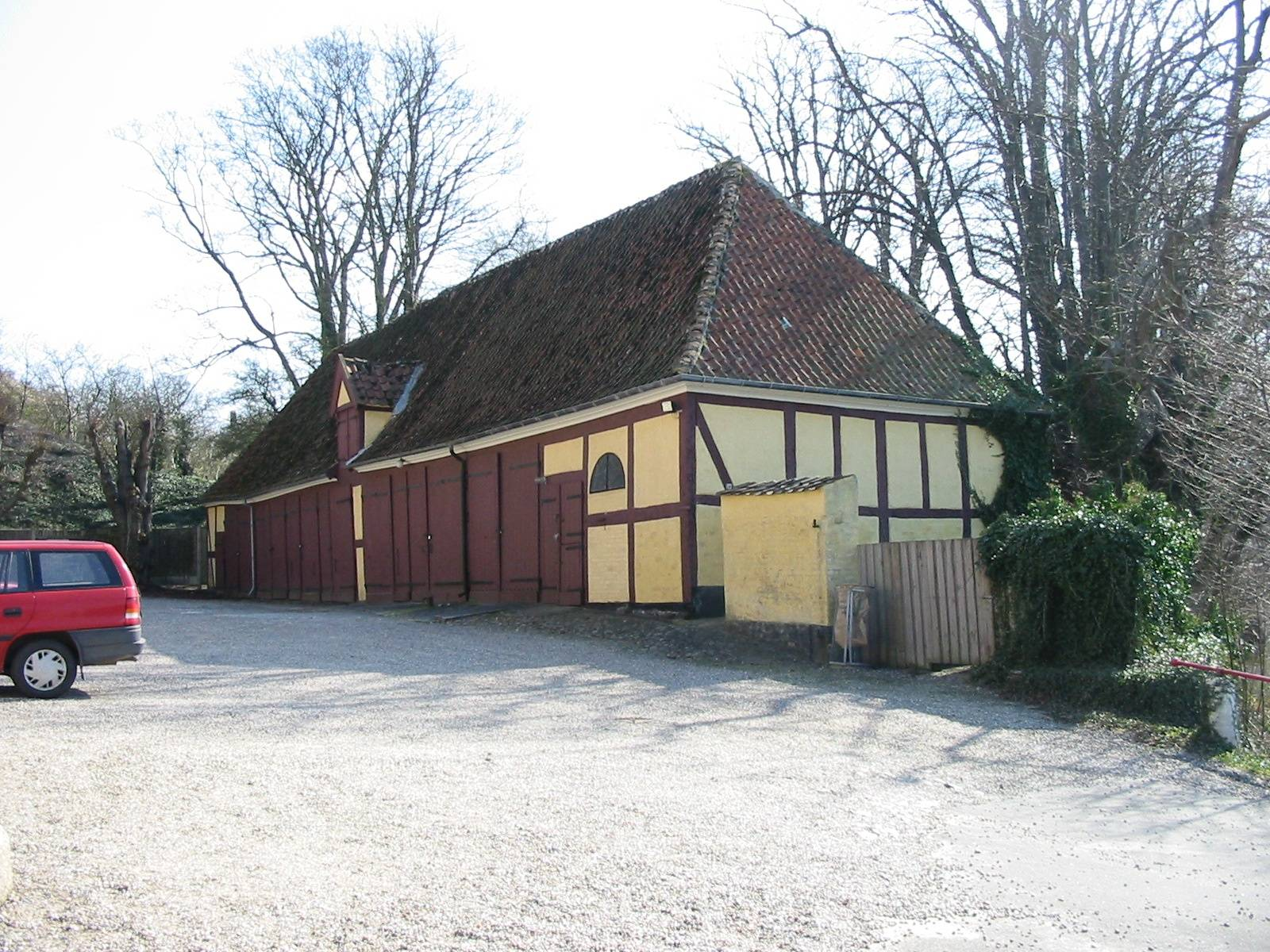
The carriage house

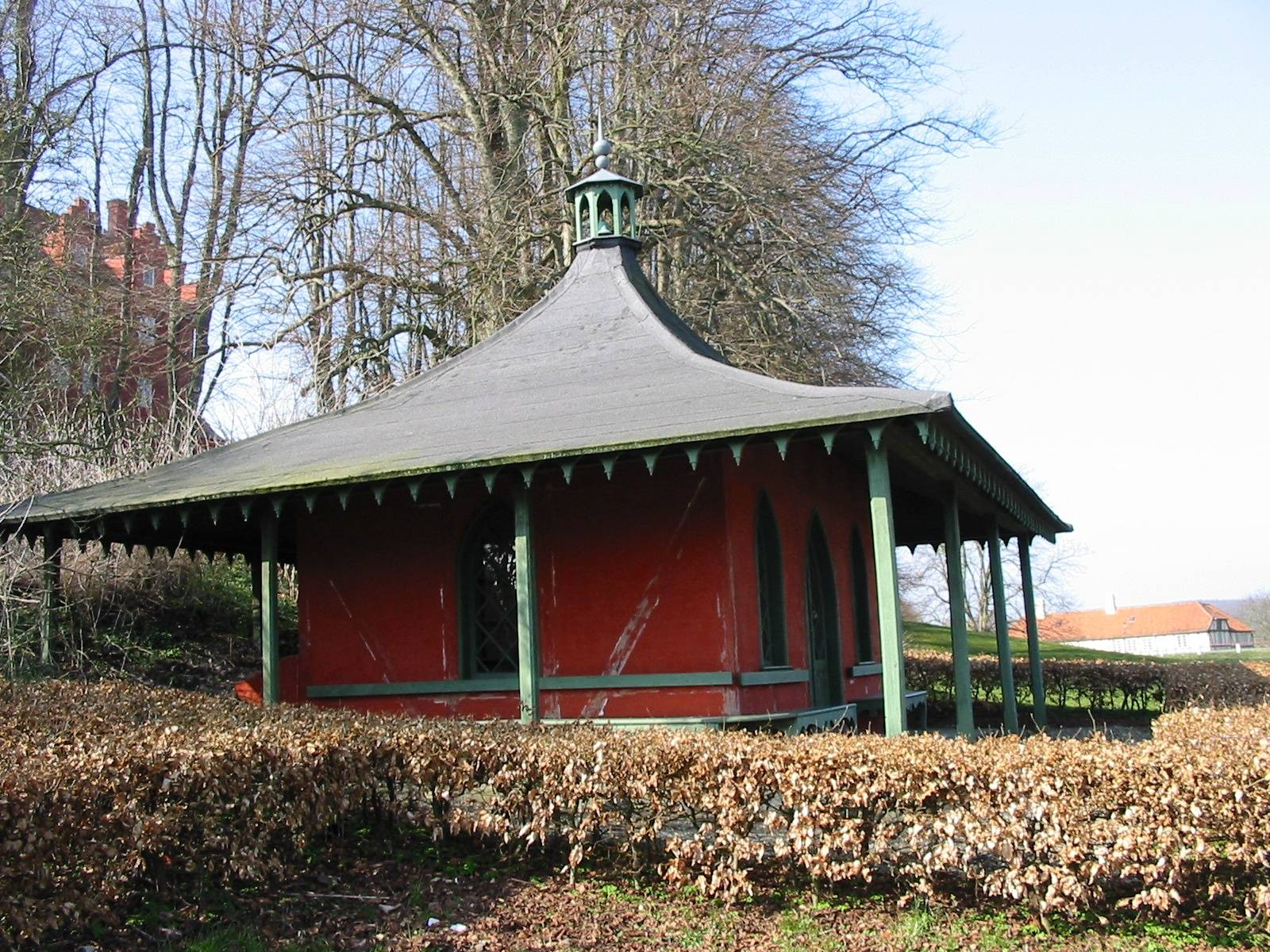
The pavilion.

== Cultural references ==
Tranekær Manor was used as a location in the 2004 feature film Fakiren fra Bilbao.

== List of owners ==
- (1358–) The Crown
- (1645–1659)Christian Rantzau
- (1659–1686) Frederik Ahlefeldt
- (1686–1708) Frederik Ahlefeldt
- (1708–1722) Carl von Ahlefeldt
- (1722–1773) Frederik Ahlefeldt
- (1773–1791) Christian Ahlefeldt-Laurvig
- (1791–1832) Frederik Ahlefeldt-Laurvig
- (1832–1856) Christian Johan Frederik Ahlefeldt-Laurvig
- (1856–1889) Frederik Ludvig Vilhelm Ahlefeldt-Laurvig
- (1889–1917) Christian Johan Frederik Ahlefeldt-Laurvig
- (1917–1947) Frederik Ludvig Vilhelm Ahlefeldt-Laurvig
- (1947–1970) Kai Benedict Ahlefeldt-Laurvig
- (1970–1995) Preben Vilhelm Gustav Ahlefeldt-Laurvig
- (1995–present) Christian Benedict Ahlefeldt-Laurvig
