= Réchicourt-le-Château =

Réchicourt-le-Château Rixingen (German)
- Commune
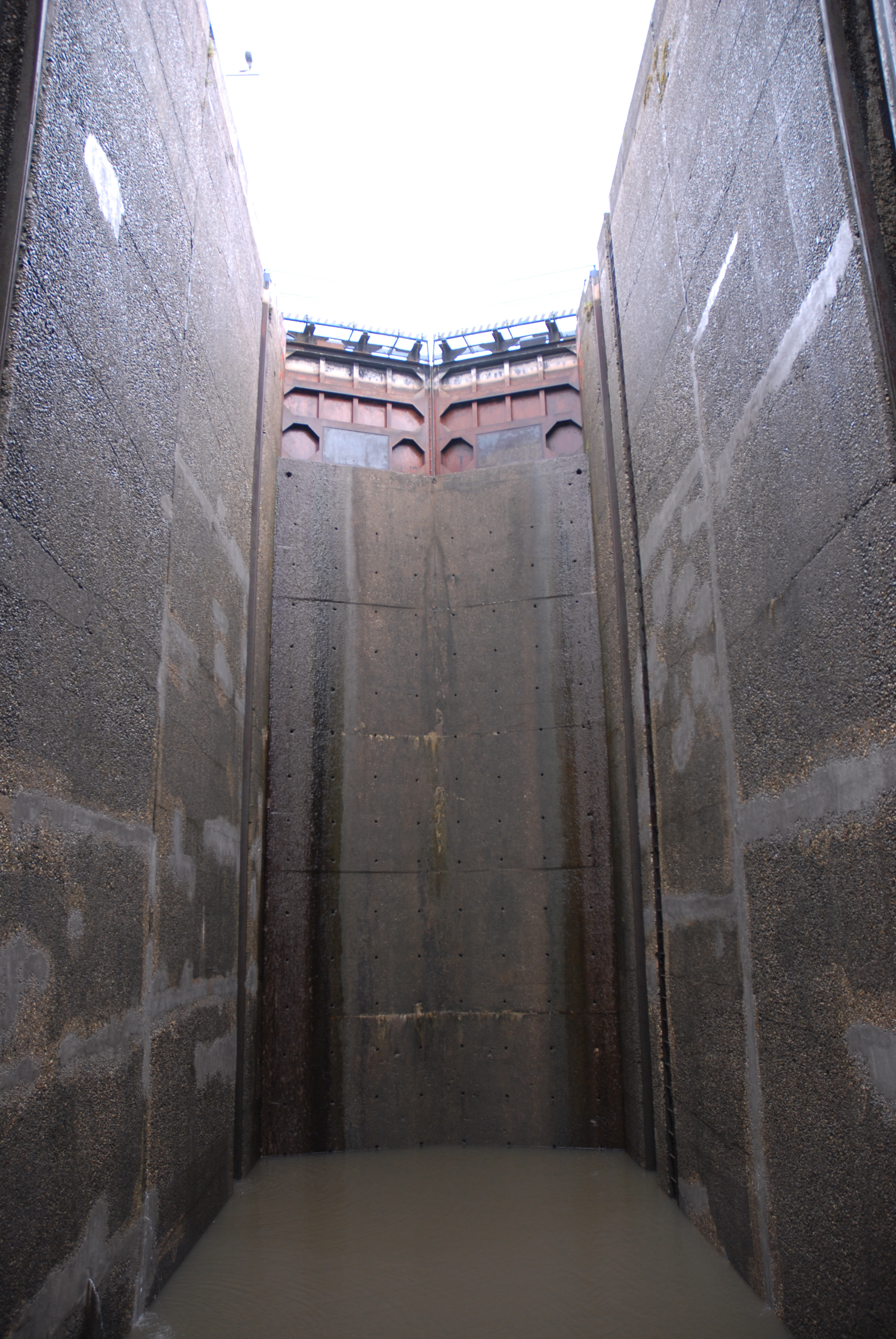
- Lock in the Marne–Rhine Canal

- Coat of arms
- Location of Réchicourt-le-Château
- Location within France Location within Grand Est
- Coordinates: 48°39′56″N 6°50′28″E
- Country: France
- Region: Grand Est
- Department: Moselle
- Arrondissement: Sarrebourg-Château-Salins
- Canton: Sarrebourg
- Intercommunality: Sarrebourg - Moselle Sud

Government
  - Mayor (2020–2026): Stéphane Ermann
- Area^{1}: 24.14 km^{2} (9.32 sq mi)
- Highest elevation: 333 m (1,093 ft)
- Lowest elevation: 242 m (794 ft)
- Population (2023): 550
  - Density: 23/km^{2} (59/sq mi)
- Time zone: UTC+01:00 (CET)
  - Summer (DST): UTC+02:00 (CEST)
- INSEE/Postal code: 57564 /57810
- ^{1} French Land Register data, which excludes lakes, ponds, glaciers > 1 km^{2} (0.386 sq mi or 247 acres) and river estuaries.

Réchicourt-le-Château (French: [ʁeʃikuʁ lə ʃɑto]; German: Rixingen) is a commune in the Moselle department in Grand Est in north-eastern France. It is part of the arrondissement of Sarrebourg-Château-Salins.

== History ==
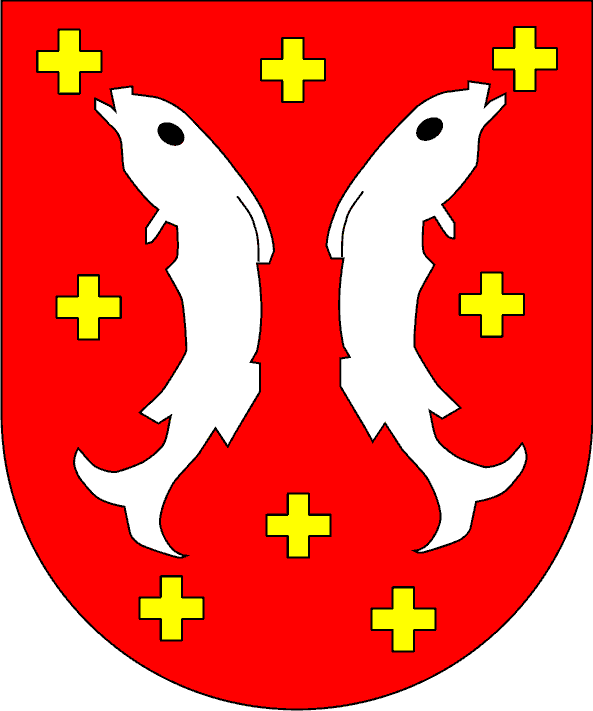
Coat of arms of the Lordship and later Imperial county of Rixingen

Prior to French Revolution, it was an Imperial County, part of the Holy Roman Empire, which was ruled by the Counts of Ahlefeldt (1669-1751), and later by the Dukes of Richelieu. Only after 1789 it became part of (then) Kingdom of France.

== La Grande Ecluse de Réchicourt ==
A narrow stretch of the Canal de la Marne au Rhin from locks 6 to 1 on the western side of the summit pound which caused delays to barge traffic led to the decision to build a new lock to replace them. The lock, built alongside lock 2 and taking its number, has a rise/drop of around 15 metres and is the deepest lock on the Freycinet network. It was opened in 1965. Locks 3 to 6 are totally abandoned but lock 1 is still traversed, minus the gates. Because of this, boats heading eastwards pass from lock 7 to lock 2 and then onto the summit pound.

== See also ==
- Communes of the Moselle department
- Parc naturel régional de Lorraine
