= List of state leaders in the 13th-century Holy Roman Empire =

This is a list of state leaders in the 13th century (1201–1300) AD, of the Holy Roman Empire.

== Main ==
- Holy Roman Empire, Kingdom of Germany (complete list, complete list) –

- Otto IV, Holy Roman Emperor (1209–1215), King (1198–1209)
- Philip, King (1198–1208)
- Otto IV, King (1198–1209)
- Frederick II, Holy Roman Emperor (1220–1250), King (1212–1220)
- Conrad IV, contender King (1237–1254)
- Henry Raspe, rival King (1246–1247)
- William II of Holland, rival King (1247–1256)
- Richard of Cornwall, contender King (1257–1272)
- Alfonso X, rival King (1257–1275)
- Rudolf I, contender King (1273–1291)
- Adolf, King (1292–1298)
- Albert I, King (1298–1308)

== Austrian ==
- Duchy of Austria (complete list) –

- Leopold VI the Glorious, Duke (1198–1230)
- Frederick II the Quarrelsome, Duke (1230–1246)
- Vladislaus of Moravia, claimant Duke (1246–1247)
- Herman VI of Baden, claimant Duke (1248–1250)
- Frederick I of Baden, claimant Duke (1250–1268)
- Ottokar II of Bohemia, claimant Duke (1251–1278)
- Rudolf I, Duke (1278–1282)
- Albert I, Duke (1282–1308)

- Prince-Bishopric of Brixen (complete list) –

- Konrad of Rodank, Prince-bishop (1200–1216)
- Bertold of Neifen, Prince-bishop (1216–1224)
- Heinrich of Taufers, Prince-bishop (1224–1239)
- Egno of Eppan, Prince-bishop (1240–1250)
- Bruno of Kirchberg, Prince-bishop (1250–1288)
- Heinrich of Trevejach, Prince-bishop (1290–1295)
- Landulf of Milan, Prince-bishop (1295–1300)
- Konrad Waldner, Prince-bishop (1301)

- Margraviate of Burgau –

- Heinrich III. von Burgau, Margrave (?–c.1301)

- Duchy of Carinthia (complete list) –

- Ulrich II, Duke (1181–1201)
- Bernhard, Regent (1199–1202), Duke (1202–1256)
- Ulrich III, Duke (1256–1269)
- Otakar, Duke (1269–1276)
- Rudolph I, Duke (1276–1286)
- Meinhard, Duke (1286–1295)
- Louis, co-Duke (1295–1305)
- Otto III, co-Duke (1295–1310)

- Prince-Bishopric of Chur (complete list) –

- Reinher della Torre, Prince-bishop (1194–1209)
- Arnold von Matsch, Prince-bishop (1209–1221)
- Rudolf von Güttingen, Prince-bishop (1224–1226)
- Berthold I. von Helfenstein, Prince-bishop (1228–1233)
- Ulrich IV. von Kyburg, Prince-bishop (1233/34–1237)
- Volkard von Neuburg, Prince-bishop (1237–1251)
- Heinrich III. von Montfort, Prince-bishop (1251–1268, 1268–1272)
- Konrad III. von Belmont, Prince-bishop (1273–1282)
- Friedrich I. von Montfort, Prince-bishop (1282–1290)
- Berthold II. Graf von Heiligenberg, Prince-bishop (1291–1298)
- Siegfried von Gelnhausen, Prince-bishop (1298–1321)

- County of Gorizia (complete list) –

- Engelbert III, Count (1191–1220)
- Meinhard II, Count (1220–1231)
- Meinhard III, Count (1231–1258)
- Meinhard IV, Count (1258–1271)
- Albert I, Count (1258–1304)

- Duchy of Styria (complete list) –

- Leopold VI of Austria, Duke (1194–1230)
- Frederick II of Austria, Duke (1230–1246)
- Ottokar II of Bohemia, Duke (1251/1260–1278)
- Béla IV of Hungary, Duke (1254–1258)
- Stephen V of Hungary, Duke (1258–1260)
- Rudolph I, Duke (1278–1282)
- Albert I, Duke (1282–1308)

- Prince-Bishopric of Trent (complete list) –

- Conrad II di Biseno, Prince-bishop (1188–1205)
- Federico Wanga, Prince-bishop (1207–1218)
- Albert IV von Ravenstein, Prince-bishop (1219–1223)
- Gerard I Oscasali, Prince-bishop (1223–1232)
- Aldrighetto di Castelcampo, Prince-bishop (1232–1247)
- Egno von Eppan, Prince-bishop (1250–1273)
- Henry II, Prince-bishop (1273–1289)
- Philipp Buonacolsi, Prince-bishop (1289–1303)

- County of Tyrol (complete list) –

- Henry I, Count (1180–1202)
- Albert IV, Count (1202–1253)
- Meinhard I, Count (1253–1258)
- Albert, co-Count (1258–1271)
- Meinhard II, Count (1258–1295)
- Louis of Gorizia-Tyrol, co-Count (1295–1305)
- Otto, co-Count (1295–1310)
- Henry II, Count (1295–1335)

== Bavarian ==
- Duchy of Bavaria: Upper Bavaria, Lower Bavaria (complete list) –

- Louis I, Duke (1183–1231)
- Otto the Illustrious, Duke (1231–1253)
- Louis II the Strict, Duke (1253–1255), Duke of Upper Bavaria (1255–1294)
- Henry XIII, Duke of Lower Bavaria (1253–1290)
- Louis III, co-Duke of Lower Bavaria (1290–1296)
- Stephen I, co-Duke of Lower Bavaria (1290–1310)
- Otto III, co-Duke of Lower Bavaria (1290–1312)
- Matilda, Regent of Upper Bavaria (1294–1302)
- Rudolph I, Duke of Upper Bavaria (1294–1317)

- Berchtesgaden Prince-Provostry (complete list) –

- Bernhard I of Schönstätten, Provost (1194–1201)
- Gerhard, Provost (1201)
- Hugo II, Provost (1201–1210)
- Konrad Garrer, Provost (1210–1211)
- Friedrich II Ellinger, Provost (1211–1217)
- Heinrich II, Provost (1217–1231)
- Friedrich III of Ortenburg, Provost (1231–1239)
- Bernhard II, Provost (1239–1252)
- Konrad II, Provost (1252)
- Heinrich III, Provost (1252–1257)
- Konrad III von Medling, Provost (1257–1283)
- Johann I Sachs von Sachsenau, Provost (1283–1303)

- Prince-Bishopric of Freising (complete list) –

- Waldgrave Emicho, Prince-bishop (1294–1311)

- Landgraviate of Leuchtenberg (de:complete list) –

- Diepold I, Landgrave (1168–1209)
- Gebhardt III, Landgrave (1209–1244)
- Diepold II, Landgrave (1209–1259)
- Friedrich II, Landgrave (1244–1284)
- Gebhardt VI, Landgrave (1279–1293)
- Ulrich I. (Leuchtenberg), Landgrave (1293–1334)

- Prince-Abbey of Niedermünster (complete list) –

- Heilka IV von Rotheneck, Abbess (1197–1218)
- Heilka V von Wittelsbach, Abbess (1218–1224)
- Frideruna von Falkenstein, Abbess (1224–1229)
- Mathilde III von Henffenfeld, Abbess (1229–1239)
- Tutta III von Dalmässing, Abbess (1239–1242)
- Irmgard I von Scheyern, Abbess (1242–1245)
- Hildegard von Kirchberg, Abbess (1245–1249)
- Kunigunde III von Stein, Abbess (1249–1257)
- Kühnheit Pinzingerin, Abbess (1257–c.1259)
- Wilburg von Lobsingen, Abbess (c.1259–1261)
- Tutta IV von Putingen, Abbess (1261–1264)
- Gertrud II. von Stein, Abbess (1264–1271)
- Wilburg von Lobsingen, Abbess (1271–1273)
- Elisabeth I Stauffin von Stauffenburg, Abbess (1273–1276)
- Hedwig Kropflin, Abbess (1276–1285)
- Kunigunde IV Hainkhoverin, Abbess (1285–1300)
- Adelheid II von Treidenberg, Abbess (1300–1304)

- Imperial County of Ortenburg (complete list) –

- Rapoto II, Count (1186–1231)
- Henry I, Count (1186–1241)
- Rapoto III, Count (1231–1248)
- Henry II, Count (1241–1257)
- Gebhard, Count (1238–1275), Imperial Count (1257–1275)
- Diepold, Count (1238–1272)
- Rapoto IV, Count (1275–1296), Imperial Count (1275–1296)
- Henry III, Count (1297/1321–1345)

- Pappenheim (complete list) –

- Rudolph I, Lord (1193–1221)
- Rudolph II, co-Lord (1221–1233)
- Frederick, Lord (1221–1240)
- Henry III, Lord (1240–1278)
- Henry IV, Lord (1278–1318)

- Prince-Bishopric of Passau (complete list) –

- Wolfger of Erla, Prince-Bishop (1191–1204)
- Poppo, Prince-Bishop (1204–1206)
- Manegold of Berg, Prince-Bishop (1206–1215)
- Ulrich II, Prince-Bishop (1215–1221)
- Gebhard I of Plain, Prince-Bishop (1222–1232)
- Rüdiger of Bergheim, Prince-Bishop (1233–1249)
- Konrad I, Duke of Silesia-Glogau, Prince-Bishop (1249–1249)
- Berthold of Pietengau, Prince-Bishop (1250–1254)
- Otto of Lonsdorf, Prince-Bishop (1254–1265)
- Wladislaw of Silesia, Prince-Bishop (1265)
- Petrus, Bishop of Passau, Prince-Bishop (1265–1280)
- Wichard of Pohlheim, Prince-Bishop (1280–1282)
- Gottfried, Prince-Bishop (1282–1285)
- Bernhard of Prambach, Prince-Bishop (1285–1313)

- Prince-Bishopric of Regensburg (complete list) –

- Konrad III of Laichling, Prince-bishop (1186–1204)
- Konrad IV of Frontenhausen, Prince-bishop (1204–1227)
- Siegfried, Prince-bishop (1227–1246)
- Albert I of Pietengau, Prince-bishop (1247–1260)
- Albertus Magnus, Prince-bishop (1260–1262)
- Leo Thundorfer, Prince-bishop (1262–1277)
- Heinrich II von Rotteneck, Prince-bishop (1277–1296)
- Konrad V von Luppurg, Prince-bishop (1296–1313)

- Prince-Archbishopric of Salzburg (complete list) –

- Eberhard II of Regensburg, Prince-archbishop (1200–1246)
- Bernhard I of Ziegenhain, Prince-archbishop (1247)
- Philipp of Carinthia, Prince-archbishop (1247–1256)
- Ulrich of Sekau, Prince-archbishop (1256–1265)
- Ladislaus of Salzburg, Prince-archbishop (1265–1270)
- Frederick II of Walchen, Prince-archbishop (1270–1284)
- Rudolf of Hoheneck, Prince-archbishop (1284–1290)
- Conrad IV of Breitenfurt, Prince-archbishop (1291–1312)

== Bohemian ==
- Kingdom of Bohemia (complete list) –

- Ottokar I, Duke (1192–1193, 1197–1198), King (1198–1230)
- Wenceslaus I, King (1230–1253)
- Ottokar II, King (1253–1278)
- Wenceslaus II, King (1278–1305)

- Margraviate of Moravia (complete list) –

- Vladislaus I Henry, Margrave (1197–1222)
- Vladislaus II, Margrave (1222–1227/28)
- Přemysl of Moravia, Margrave (1227–1239)
- Vladislaus III, Margrave (1239–1247)
- Ottokar II, Margrave (1247–1278)
- Wenceslaus II, Margrave (1283–1305)

- Duchy of Teschen (Cieszyn) (complete list) –

- Mieszko I, Duke (1290–1315)

== Burgundian-Low Countries ==
- County of Burgundy (complete list) –

- Joan I, Countess (1200–1205)
- Beatrice II, Countess (1205–1231)
- Otto II, Count (1208–1231)
- Otto III, Count (1231–1248)
- Adelaide, Countess (1248–1279)
- Hugh I, Count (1248–1266)
- Philip I, Count (1267–1279)
- Otto IV, Count (1279–1303)

- Duchy of Brabant (complete list) –

- Henry I, Duke (1183/1184–1235)
- Henry II, Duke (1235–1248)
- Henry III, Duke (1248–1261)
- Henry IV, Duke (1261–1267)
- John I, Duke (1267–1294)
- John II, Duke (1294–1312)

- County of Flanders (complete list) –

- Baldwin IX, Count (1194–1205)
- Joan I, Countess (1205–1244)
- Ferdinand of Portugal, Count (1212–1233)
- Thomas of Savoy-Piedmont, Count (1237–1244)
- Margaret II, Countess (1244–1278)
- William I, Count (1247–1251)
- Guy I, Count (1251–1305)

- County of Hainaut (complete list) –

- Baldwin VI, Count (1195–1205)
- Joan, Countess (1205–1244)
- Margaret of Constantinople, Countess (1244–1280)
- John I, Count (1246–1257)
- John II, Count (1280–1304)

- County of Holland (complete list) –

- Dirk VII, Count (1190–1203)
- Ada, Countess (1203–1207)
- Louis II of Loon, Count (1203–1207)
- William I, Count (1203–1222)
- Floris IV, Count (1222–1234)
- William II, Count (1234–1256)
- Floris de Voogd, Regent (1256–1258)
- Floris V, Count (1256–1296)
- John III, Lord of Renesse, Regent (1296)
- Wolfert I, Lord of Borselen, Regent (1296–1299)
- John I, Count (1296–1299)
- John II, Count of Hainaut, Regent (1299), Count (1299–1304)

- Duchy of Limburg (complete list) –

- Henry III, Duke (1170–1221)
- Waleran III, Duke (1221–1226)
- Henry IV, Duke (1226–1247)
- Waleran IV, Duke (1247–1279)
- Ermengarde, Duchess (1279–1283)
- John I, Duke (1288–1294)
- John II, Duke (1294–1312)

- County of Namur (complete list) –

- Philip I, Margrave (1195–1212)
- Yolanda, Margravine (1212–1217)
- Philip II, Margrave (1217–1226)
- Henry II, Margrave (1226–1229)
- Margaret, Margravine (1229–1237)
- Baldwin II, Margrave (1237–1256)
- Henry III, Margrave (1256–1265)
- Guy I, Margrave (1265–1297)
- John I, Margrave (1297–1330)

== Franconian ==
- Prince-Bishopric of Bamberg (complete list) –

- Heinrich I von Bilversheim, Prince-bishop (1245–1257)
- Ladislaus of Salzburg, Prince-bishop (1257)
- Berthold von Leiningen, Prince-bishop (1257–1285)
- Mangold von Neuenburg, Prince-bishop (1285)
- Arnold von Solms, Prince-bishop (1286–1296)
- Leopold I von Grundlach, Prince-bishop (1296–1303)

- County of Castell (complete list) –

- Rupert I, Count (1200–1223)
- Louis, co-Count (1223–1230)
- Rupert II, co-Count (1223–1235)
- Albert II, Count (1235–1254)
- Frederick II, co-Count (1235–1251)
- Henry I, Count co-Count (1235–1254)
- Frederick III, Count (1251–1254)

- County of Castell, Elder Line (complete list) –

- Henry II, Count (1254–1307)

- County of Castell, Younger Line (complete list) –

- Albert II, Count (1254–1258)
- Herman II, Count (1258–1285)
- Frederick IV Count of Younger Line (1285–1347), Count (1347–1349)

- Prince-Bishopric of Würzburg (complete list) –

- Konrad von Querfurt, Prince-bishop (1197–1202)
- Heinrich IV von Katzburg, Prince-bishop (1202–1207)
- Otto von Lobdeburg, Prince-bishop (1207–1223)
- Dietrich von Homburg, Prince-bishop (1223–1225)
- Hermann I von Lobdeburg, Prince-bishop (1225–1254)
- Iring von Reinstein-Homburg, Prince-bishop (1254–1266)
- Heinrich V von Leiningen, Prince-bishop (1254–1255)
- Poppo III von Trimberg, Prince-bishop (1267–1271)
- Berthold I von Henneberg, Prince-bishop (1271–1274)
- Berthold II von Sternberg, Prince-bishop (1274–1287)
- Mangold von Neuenburg, Prince-bishop (1287–1303)

== Electoral Rhenish ==
- Archbishopric/ Elector-Archbishopric of Cologne (complete list) –

- Adolf I von Berg, Prince-Archbishop (1192–1205)
- Bruno IV von Sayn, Prince-Archbishop (1205–1208, in opposition)
- Dietrich I von Hengebach, Prince-Archbishop (1208–1215, in opposition)
- Engelbert II von Berg, Prince-Archbishop (1216–1225)
- Heinrich I von Mulnarken, Prince-Archbishop (1225–1237)
- Konrad von Hochstaden, Archbishop-elector (1238–1261)
- Engelbert II von Falkenburg, Archbishop-elector (1261–1274)
- Siegfried II of Westerburg, Archbishop-elector (1274–1297)
- Wikbold I von Holte, Archbishop-elector (1297–1304)

- County Palatine of the Rhine (complete list) –

- Henry V, Count (1195–1213)
- Henry VI, Count (1213–1214)
- Louis I the Kelheimer, Count (1214–1231)
- Otto II the Illustrious, Count (1231–1253)
- Louis II the Strict, Count (1253–1294)
- Rudolph I the Stammerer, Count (1296–1317)

- Prince/Elector-Bishopric of Mainz (complete list) –

- Luitpold von Scheinfeld, Prince-archbishop (1200–1208)
- Sigfried II von Eppstein, opposing Prince-archbishop (1200–1208), Prince-archbishop (1208–1230)
- Sigfried III von Eppstein, Prince-archbishop (1230–1249)
- Christian von Weisenau, Prince-archbishop (1249–1251)
- Gerhard I von Daun-Kirberg, Archbishop-elector (1251–1259)
- Werner II von Eppstein, Archbishop-elector (1260–1284)
- Heinrich II von Isny, Archbishop-elector (1286–1288)
- Gerhard II von Eppstein, Archbishop-elector (1286–1305)

- Nieder-Isenburg (Lower Isenburg) (complete list) –

- Theodoric I, Count (1218–1253)
- Theodoric II, Count (1253–1273)
- Salentin I, Count (1273–1300)
- Salentin II, Count (1300–1334)

- Elector-Bishopric of Trier (complete list) –

- John I, Archbishop-elector (1189–1212)
- Theodoric II, Archbishop-elector (1212–1242)
- Arnold II von Isenburg, Archbishop-elector (1242–1259)
- Heinrich I von Finstingen, Archbishop-elector (1260–1286)
- Bohemond I von Warnesberg, Archbishop-elector (1286–1299)
- Diether von Nassau, Archbishop-elector (1300–1307)

== Lower Rhenish–Westphalian ==
- County of Bentheim (complete list) –

- Sophia, Countess (1149–1176) and Dirk of Holland, Count (1149–1157)
- Otto I, Count (1176–1207)
- Baldwin, Count (1207–1247)
- Otto II, Count (1247–1277)

- Bentheim-Bentheim (complete list) –

- Egbert, Count (1277–1305)

- Bentheim-Tecklenburg (complete list) –

- Otto III, Count (1277–1338)
- Otto IV, Count (1289–1302)

- Duchy of Cleves (complete list) –

- Arnold II, Count (1198–1201)
- Dietrich V, Count (1201–1260)
- Dietrich VI, Count (1260–1275)
- Dietrich VII of Meissen, Count (1275–1305)

- Princely Abbey of Corvey (de:complete list) –

- Hugold von Luthardessen, Abbot (1216–1220), Prince-abbot (1220–1223)
- Hermann I. von Holte, Prince-abbot (1223–1254)
- Thimo, Prince-abbot (1254–1275)
- Heinrich III. von Homburg, Prince-abbot (1275–1306)

- Essen Abbey (complete list) –

- Elisabeth I, Princess-Abbess (1172–pre-1216)
- Adelheid, Princess-Abbess (1216–1237)
- Elisabeth II, Princess-Abbess (c.1237–1241)
- Bertha of Arnsberg, Princess-Abbess (pre-1243–1292)
- Beatrix von Holte, Princess-Abbess (1292–1327)

- County of Guelders (complete list) –

- Otto I, Count (1182–1207)
- Gerard III, Count (1207–1229)
- Otto II, Count (1229–1271)
- Reginald I, Count (1271–1318)

- Herford Abbey (complete list) –

- Eilika, Abbess (c. 1212)
- Gertrud II of Lippe, Abbess (pre-1217–post-1233)
- Ida, Abbess (pre-1238–post-1264)
- Pinnosa, Abbess (pre-1265–post-1276)
- Mechtild II of Waldeck, Abbess (pre-1277–post-1288)
- Irmgard of Wittgenstein, Abbess (pre-1290–1323)

- Prince-Bishopric of Liège (complete list) –

- Hugh of Pierrepont, Prince-Bishop (1200–1229)
- John of Eppes, Prince-Bishop (1229–1238)
- William of Savoy, Prince-Bishop (1238–1239)
- Robert of Thourotte, Prince-Bishop (1240–1246)
- Henry of Guelders, Prince-Bishop (1247–1274)
- John of Enghien, Prince-Bishop (1274–1281)
- John of Flanders, Prince-Bishop (1282–1291)
- Hugh of Chalon, Prince-Bishop (1295–1301)

- County of Luxemburg (complete list) –

- Ermesinde, Countess (1197–1247)
- Theobald, Count (1197–1214)
- Waleran, Count (1214–1226)
- Henry V, Count (1247–1281)
- Henry VI, Count (1281–1288)
- Henry VII, Count (1288–1313)

- County of Mark (complete list) –

- Adolph I, Count (1198–1249)
- Engelbert I, Count (1249–1277)
- Eberhard II, Count (1277–1308)

- Prince-Bishopric of Münster (complete list) –

- Hermann II of Katzenelnbogen, Prince-bishop (1180–1202)
- Otto I of Oldenburg, Prince-bishop (1203–1218)
- Dietrich of Isenberg, Prince-bishop (1219–1226)
- Ludolf of Holte, Prince-bishop (1226–1247)
- Otto II of Lippe, Prince-bishop (1247–1259)
- Wilhelm I of Holte, Prince-bishop (1259–1260)
- Gerhard of the March, Prince-bishop (1261–1272)
- Everhard of Diest, Prince-bishop (1275–1301)

- County of Oldenburg (complete list) –

- Maurice I, Count (1168–1211)
- Otto I, Count (1209–1251)
- Christian II, Count (1211–1233)
- John I, Count (1233–1272)
- Christian III, Count (1272–1278)
- Otto II, Count of Oldenburg-Delmenhorst, Count (1272–1301)
- John II, Count (1278–1305)

- Prince-Bishopric of Osnabrück (complete list) –

- Engelbert I von Isenberg, Prince-bishop (1225–1226)
- Otto I, Prince-bishop (1206–1227)
- Konrad I von Velber, Prince-bishop (1227–1239)
- Engelbert I von Isenberg, Prince-bishop (1239–1250)
- Bruno von Isenberg, Prince-bishop (1251–1258)
- Balduin von Rüssel, Prince-bishop (1259–1264)
- Widukind von Waldeck, Prince-bishop (1265–1269)
- Konrad von Rietberg, Prince-bishop (1270–1297)
- Ludwig von Ravensberg, Prince-bishop (1297–1308)

- County of Runkel (complete list) –

- Siegfried III, Count (1219–1227)
- Theodoric I, Count (1227–?)
- Siegfried, Count (?–1228)

- County of Schaumburg (complete list) –

- Adolf III, Count (1164–1225)
- Adolf IV, Count (1225–1238)
- Gerhard I, Count (1238–1290)
- Adolph VI the Elder, Count (1290–1315)

- Prince-Bishopric of Utrecht (complete list) –

- Dirk II van Are), Prince-bishop (1197/98–1212)
- Otto I van Gelre, Prince-bishop (1212–1215)
- Otto II van Lippe, Prince-bishop (1216–1227)
- Wilbrand van Oldenburg, Prince-bishop (1227–1233)
- Otto III van Holland, Prince-bishop (1233–1249)
- Gozewijn van Amstel (van Randerath) (1249–1250)
- Henry I van Vianden, Prince-bishop (1250/52–1267)
- John I of Nassau, Prince-bishop (1267–1290)
- John II van Sierck, Prince-bishop (1290–1296)
- Willem II Berthout, Prince-bishop (1296–1301)

- Prince-Bishopric of Verden (complete list) –

- Iso of Wölpe, Prince-Bishop (1205–1231)
- Luder of Borch, Prince-Bishop (1231–1251)
- Gerard of Hoya, Prince-Bishop (1251–1269)
- Conrad of Brunswick and Lunenburg, Prince-Bishop (1269–1300)
- Frederick Man of Honstädt, Prince-Bishop (1300–1312)

- County of Wied (complete list) –

- George, Count (1197–1219)
- Lothar, Count (?–1243)

merge to form Isenburg-Wied

== Upper Rhenish ==
- County of Bar (complete list) –

- Theobald I, Count (1189–1214)
- Henry II, Count (1214–1239)
- Theobald II, Count (1239–1291)
- Henry III, Count (1291–1302)

- Prince-Bishopric of Basel (complete list) –

- Leuthold I von Rotheln, Prince-bishop (1192–1213)
- Walther von Rotheln, Prince-bishop (1213–1215)
- Heinrich II von Thun, Prince-bishop (1216–1238)
- Leuthold II von Arburg, Prince-bishop (1238–1249)
- Berthold II von Pfirt, Prince-bishop (1250–1262)
- Heinrich III von Neuenburg-Erguel, Prince-bishop (1262–1274)
- Heinrich IV Knoderer, Prince-bishop (1275–1286)
- Peter I Reich von Reichenstein, Prince-bishop (1286–1296)
- Peter von Aspelt, Prince-bishop (1297–1306)

- Princely Abbey of Fulda (complete list) –

- Konrad III. von Malkes, Prince-abbot (1221–1249)
- Heinrich IV. von Erthal, Prince-abbot (1249–1261)
- Bertho II. von Leibolz, Prince-abbot (1261–1271)
- Bertho III. von Mackenzell, Prince-abbot (1271–1272)
- Bertho IV. von Biembach, Prince-abbot (1273–1286)
- Markward II. von Bickenbach, Prince-abbot (1286–1288)
- Heinrich V. Graf von Weilnau, Prince-abbot (1288–1313)

- Landgraviate of Hesse (complete list) –

- Henry I the Child, Landgrave (1264–1308)

- Isenburg-Braunsberg (complete list) –

- Bruno II, Count (1210–1255)
- Bruno III, Count (1255–1278)
- John I, Count (1278–1327)

- Isenburg-Covern (complete list) –

- Gerlach II, Count (1158–1217)
- Gerlach III, Count (1217–1235)
- Henry, Count (1229–1263)
- Frederick I, Count (1246–1272)
- Frederick II, Count (1272–1277)
- Robin, Count (1272–1306)

- Isenburg-Grenzau (complete list) –

- Henry I, Count (1158–1220)
- Henry II, Count (1220–1286)
- Eberhard I, Count (1286–1290)

- Isenburg-Kempenich (complete list) –

- Salentin and Rosemann, Count (12th/13th century)
- Theodoric II, Count (?–1232)
- Theodoric III, Count (13th century)
- Gerard I, Count (13th/14th century)

- Isenburg-Limburg (complete list) –

- Gerlach IV, Count of Isenburg-Grenzau (1220/1227–1258), Count of Isenburg-Limburg (1258–1289)
- John I the Blind Lord, Count (1289–1312/19)

- County of Leiningen (de:complete list) –

- Emich III, Count (fl.1193–1208)
- Friedrich I, Count (c.1208–pre-1220)
- Friedrich II, Count (?–1237)
- Simon, Count (c.1237–1234)
- Friedrich III, Count (c.1234–1287)
- Friedrich IV, Count (c.1287–1316)

- Leiningen-Landeck –

- Emich IV, Count (?–c.1276)
- Emich V, Count (?–1289)

- Duchy of Lorraine (complete list) –

- Simon II, Duke (1176–1205)
- Frederick I, Duke (1205–1206)
- Frederick II, Duke (1206–1213)
- Theobald I, Duke (1213–1220)
- Matthias II, Duke (1220–1251)
- Frederick III, Duke (1251–1302)

- County of Nassau-Saarbrücken (complete list) –

- Simon II, Count (1182–1207)
- Simon III, Count (1207–1245)
- Lauretta, Count (1245–1271)
- Mathilde, Count (1271–1274)
- Simon IV, Count (1271–1308)

- Lower Salm (complete list) –

- Frederick II, Count (1172–1210)
- Gerhard, Count (1210–1240)
- Henry III, Count (1240–1247)
- Henry IV, Count (1247–1265)
- William, Count (1265–1297)
- Henry V, Count (1297–1336)

- Upper Salm (complete list) –

- Henry I, Count (1165–1210)
- Henry II, Count (1210–1240)
- Henry III, Count (1240–1293)
- John I, Count (1293–1326)

- Salm-Blankenburg (complete list) –

- Frederick I, Count (1210–1270)
- Henry I, Count (1270–1301)

- County of Sayn (complete list) –

- Henry I/II, co-Count (1176–1203)
- Eberhard II, co-Count (1176–1202)
- Henry II/III, Count (1202–1246)
- John I (Count of Sponheim-Starkenburg), Regent (1226–1246)
- Mechtilde, Count (fl.1278–1282)
- John I, Count (1283–1324)

- Prince-Bishopric of Sion (complete list) –

- Nantelme of Écublens, Prince-Bishop (1196–1203)
- Guillaume of Saillon, Prince-Bishop (1203–1205)
- Landry of Mont, Prince-Bishop (1206–1237)
- Boson II of Granges, Prince-Bishop (1237–1243)
- Henri of Rarogne, Prince-Bishop (1243–1271)
- Rodolphe of Valpelline, Prince-Bishop (1271–1273)
- Pierre of Oron, Prince-Bishop (1273–1287)
- Boniface of Challant, Prince-Bishop (1289–1308)

- Solms-Braunfels (complete list) –

- Henry III, Count (1258–1312)

- Prince-Bishopric of Speyer (complete list) –

- Conrad III of Scharfenberg, Prince-bishop (1200–1224)
- Beringer of Entringen, Prince-bishop (1224–1232)
- Konrad IV of Dahn, Prince-bishop (1233–1236)
- Konrad V of Eberstein, Prince-bishop (1237–1245)
- Heinrich of Leiningen, Prince-bishop (1245–1272)
- Friedrich of Bolanden, Prince-bishop (1272–1302)

- Prince-Bishopric of Strasbourg (complete list) –

- Konrad II von Hühnenburg, Prince-Bishop (1190–1202)
- Heinrich II von Veringen, Prince-Bishop (1202–1223)
- Berthold I von Teck, Prince-Bishop (1223–1244)
- Heinrich III von Stahleck, Prince-Bishop (1243 bis–1260)
- Walter von Geroldseck, Prince-Bishop (1260–1263)
- Heinrich IV von Geroldseck, Prince-Bishop (1263–1273)
- Konrad of Lichtenberg, Prince-Bishop (1273–1299)
- Friedrich I von Lichtenberg, Prince-Bishop (1299–1306)

- County of Wied (complete list) –

- George, Count (1197–1219)
- Lothar, Count (1219–1243)

united into Isenburg-Wied

- Prince-Bishopric of Worms (complete list) –

- Luitpold von Schonfeld, Prince-bishop (1196–1217)
- Henry II of Saarbrücken, Prince-bishop (1217–1234)
- Landolf of Hoheneck, Prince-bishop (1234–1247)
- Konrad III von Durkheim, Prince-bishop (1247)
- Richard of Dhaun, Prince-bishop (1247–1257)
- Eberhard I of Baumberg, Prince-bishop (1257–1277)
- Friedrich of Baumberg, Prince-bishop (1277–1283)
- Simon von Schoneck, Prince-bishop (1283–1291)
- Eberhard II von Strahlenberg, Prince-bishop (1291–1293)
- Emicho of Baumberg, Prince-bishop (1294–1299)
- Eberwin von Kronenberg, Prince-bishop (1300–1308)

== Lower Saxon ==
- Duchy of Saxony (complete list) –

- Bernhard, Duke (1180–1212)
- Albert I, Duke (1212–1260)
- John I, co-Duke (1260–1282)
- Albert II, co-Duke of Saxony (1260–1296), of Saxe-Wittenberg (1296–1298)
- Albert III, co-Duke of Saxony (1282–1296), Duke of Saxe-Lauenburg (1296–1303), of Saxe-Ratzeburg (1303–1308)
- John II, co-Duke of Saxony (1282–1296), Duke of Saxe-Lauenburg (1296–1303), of Saxe-Mölln (1303–1322)
- Eric I, co-Duke of Saxony (1282–1296), Duke of Saxe-Lauenburg (1296–1303), of Saxe-Bergedorf (1303–1321), of Saxe-Ratzeburg (1308–1338)

- Saxe-Lauenburg (complete list) –

- Albert III, co-Duke of Saxony (1282–1296), Duke of Saxe-Lauenburg (1296–1303), of Saxe-Ratzeburg (1303–1308)
- John II, co-Duke of Saxony (1282–1296), Duke of Saxe-Lauenburg (1296–1303), of Saxe-Mölln (1303–1322)
- Eric I, co-Duke of Saxony (1282–1296), Duke of Saxe-Lauenburg (1296–1303), of Saxe-Bergedorf (1303–1321), of Saxe-Ratzeburg (1308–1338)

- Prince-Archbishopric of Bremen (complete list) –

- Hartwig II, Prince-archbishop (1192–1207)
- Burchard I, Prince-archbishop (1207–1210)
- Valdemar of Denmark, Prince-archbishop (1208–1217)
- Gerard I, Prince-archbishop (1210–1219)
- Gerhard II of Lippe, Prince-archbishop (1219–1258)
- Hildebold, Count of Wunstorf, Prince-archbishop (1258–1273)
- Gilbert of Brunckhorst, Prince-archbishop (1274–1306)

- Duchy of Brunswick-Lüneburg (complete list) –

- Otto I the Child, Duke (1235–1252)
- Albert I the Tall, Duke of Brunswick-Lüneburg (1252–1269), Prince of Brunswick-Wolfenbüttel (1269–1279), Regent of Lüneburg (1277–1279)
- John I, Duke of Brunswick-Lüneburg (1252–1269), Prince of Lüneburg (1269–1277)

- Principality of Brunswick-Wolfenbüttel/ Principality of Wolfenbüttel (complete list) –

- Albert I the Tall, Duke of Brunswick-Lüneburg (1252–1269), Prince of Brunswick-Wolfenbüttel (1269–1279), Regent of Lüneburg (1277–1279)
- Henry I the Admirable, co-Prince of Brunswick-Wolfenbüttel (1279–1291), Prince of Grubenhagen (1291–1322)
- William I, co-Prince (1279–1291), Prince (1291–1292)
- Albert II the Fat, Prince of Brunswick-Wolfenbüttel (1279–1291, 1292–1318), of Göttingen (1286–1318)

- Gandersheim Abbey (complete list) –

- Mechthild I, Princess-Abbess (1196–1223)
- Bertha II, Princess-Abbess (1223–1252)
- Margarete I, Princess-Abbess (1253–1305)

- Principality of Grubenhagen (complete list) –

- Henry I the Admirable, co-Prince of Brunswick-Wolfenbüttel (1279–1291), Prince of Grubenhagen (1291–1322)

- Prince-Bishopric of Hildesheim (complete list) –

- Conrad II of Reifenberg, Prince-bishop (1235–1246)
- Heinrich I. von Rusteberg, Prince-bishop (1247–1257)
- John I of Brakel, Prince-bishop (1257–1260)
- Otto I of Braunschweig-Lüneburg, Prince-bishop (1260–1279)
- Siegfried II of Querfurt, Prince-bishop (1279–1310)

- County of Holstein (complete list) –

- Adolf III, Count (1164–1203)
- Valdemar II of Denmark, Count (1203–1208)
- Albrecht II (Weimar-Orlamünde), Count (1208–1227)
- Adolf IV, Count (1227–1238)
- Heilwig of Lippe, Regent (1238–c.1243)
- John I, co-Count of Holstein (1238–1261), Count of Holstein-Kiel (1261–1263)
- Gerhard I, co-Count of Holstein (1238–1261), Count of Holstein-Itzehoe (1261–1290)

- Holstein-Itzehoe –

- Gerhard I, co-Count of Holstein (1238–1261), Count of Holstein-Itzehoe (1261–1290)

- Holstein-Kiel (complete list) –

- John I, co-Count of Holstein (1238–1261), Count of Holstein-Kiel (1261–1263)
- Adolph V, co-Count of Holstein-Kiel (1263–1273), Count of Holstein-Segeberg (1273–1308)
- John II the One-Eyed, co-Count of Holstein-Kiel (1263–1273), Count (1273–1316)

- Holstein-Segeberg –

- Adolph V, co-Count of Holstein-Kiel (1263–1273), Count of Holstein-Segeberg (1273–1308)

- Holstein-Plön (complete list) –

- Gerhard II the Blind, Count (1290–1312)

- Holstein-Rendsburg (complete list) –

- Henry I, Count (1290–1304)

- Holstein-Pinneberg (Holstein-Schaumburg) (complete list) –

- Adolph VI the Elder, Count (1290–1315)

- Prince-bishopric of Lübeck (complete list) –

- Theodoric I, Prince-bishop (1186–1210)
- Bertold, Prince-bishop (1210–1230)
- John I, Prince-bishop (1230/1231–1247)
- Albert I, Prince-bishop (1247–1253)
- John II, Prince-bishop (1254–1259)
- John III, Prince-bishop (1260–1276)
- Burkhard of Serkem, Prince-bishop (1276–1317)

- Free City of Lübeck (complete list) –

- Hinrich Wullenpund, Mayor (1229–1230, 1232–1233, 1236, 1240)
- Hinrich Witte, Mayor (1227–1236)
- Gottschalck v. Bardewik, Mayor (1229, 1233–1234, 1240, 1244)
- Wilhelm Witte (Bürgermeister), Mayor (1250, 1253)
- Marquard von Hagen, Mayor (1230–1240)
- Hinrich Vorrade, Mayor (1238–1263)
- Hildemar, Mayor (1250–1266)
- Hinrich v. Wittenborg, Mayor (1255–1256, 1259, 1261, 1268–1269, 1273)
- Johann von Bardewik, Mayor (1263, 1266, 1269, 1277, 1281, 1283, 1285, 1287)
- Vromold von Vifhusen, Mayor (1271 und 1286)
- Hinrich Steneke, Mayor (1276–1277, 1286–1287, 1289, 1291–1294, 1298)
- Johann Moench, Mayor (1266, 1273–1274)
- Bertram Stalbuk, Mayor (1276, 1281, 1283)
- Hildebrand v. Mölln, Mayor (1269–1287)
- Arnold Schotelmund, Mayor (1271–1291)
- Alwin vom Steene, Mayor (1289–1290)
- Johann Runese, Mayor (1292, 1299–1317)
- Marquard Hildemar, Mayor (1286, 1290, 1293, 1297–1300)
- Dietrich Vorrade, Mayor (1291)
- Bernhard von Coesfeld, Mayor (1299–1301)

- Principality of Lüneburg (complete list) –

- John I, Duke of Brunswick-Lüneburg (1252–1269), Prince of Lüneburg (1269–1277)
- Albert I the Tall, Duke of Brunswick-Lüneburg (1252–1269), Prince of Brunswick-Wolfenbüttel (1269–1279), Regent of Lüneburg (1277–1279)
- Conrad, Regent (1277–1282)
- Otto II the Strict, Prince (1277–1330)

- Prince-Archbishopric of Magdeburg (complete list) –

- Ludolf of Koppenstedt, Prince-archbishop (1192–1205)
- Albert I of Käfernburg, Prince-archbishop (1205–1232)
- Burkhard I of Woldenberg, Prince-archbishop (1232–1235)
- Wilbrand of Kasernberg, Prince-archbishop (1235–1254)
- Rudolf of Dinselstadt, Prince-archbishop (1254–1260)
- Rupert of Mansfeld, Prince-archbishop (1260–1266)
- Conrad II of Sternberg, Prince-archbishop (1266–1277)
- Günther I of Schwalenberg, Prince-archbishop (1277–1279)
- Bernhard III of Wolpe, Prince-archbishop (1279–1282)
- Eric of Brandenburg, Prince-archbishop (1282–1295)
- Burkhard II of Blankenburg, Prince-archbishop (1295–1305)

- Mecklenburg (complete list) –

- Henry Borwin I, Lord (1178–1219)
- Nicholas II, co-Lord (1219–1225)
- Henry Borwin II, co-Lord (1219–1226)
- John I the Theologian, Lord (1227–1264)
- Henry I the Pilgrim, Lord (1264–1275, 1299–1302)
- Albert I, co-Lord (1264–1265)
- Nicholas III, co-Lord (1264–1289)
- Henry II the Lion, Lord (1290–1329)

- County of Oldenburg (complete list) –

- Maurice I, Count (1168–1211)
- Otto I, Count (1209–1251)
- Christian II, Count (1211–1233)
- John I, Count (1233–1272)
- Christian III, Count (1272–1278)
- Otto II, Count (1272–1301)
- John II, Count (1278–1305)

- Lordship of Parchim-Richenberg –

- Pribislaus I, Lord (1227–1256)

- Lordship of Rostock –

- Henry Borwin III, Lord (1227–1278)
- Waldemar, Lord (1278–1282)
- Agnes of Holstein-Kiel, Regent (1282–1284)
- Nicholas I the Child, Lord (1282–1314)

- Werle (complete list) –

- Nicholas I, Lord (1227–1277)
- John I, co-Lord of Werle (1277–1281), of Werle-Parchim (1281–1283)
- Bernard I, co-Lord of Werle (1277–1281), of Werle-Prisannewitz (1281–1286)
- Henry I, co-Lord of Werle (1277–1281), of Werle-Güstrow (1281–1291)
- Nicholas II, Lord of Werle-Parchim (1291–1294), of Werle (1294–1316)

- Werle-Prisannewitz (complete list) –

- Bernard I, co-Lord of Werle (1277–1281), of Werle-Prisannewitz (1281–1286)

- Werle-Güstrow (complete list) –

- Henry I, co-Lord of Werle (1277–1281), of Werle-Güstrow (1281–1291)
- Henry II, Lord (1291–1294)

inherited by Werle-Parchim

- Werle-Parchim (complete list) –

- John I, co-Lord of Werle (1277–1281), of Werle-Parchim (1281–1283)
- Nicholas II, Lord of Werle-Parchim (1291–1294), of Werle (1294–1316)

== Upper Saxon ==
- County/ Principality of Anhalt (complete list) –

- Bernard I, Count (1170–1212)
- Henry I, Count (1212–1218), Prince (1218–1252)

- Anhalt-Aschersleben (complete list) –

- Henry II the Fat, Prince (1252–1266)
- Matilda of Brunswick-Lüneburg, Regent (1266–1270)
- Henry III, co-Prince (1266–1283)
- Otto I, co-Prince (1270–1304)

- Anhalt-Bernburg (complete list) –

- Bernhard I, Prince (1252–1287)
- John I, co-Prince (1287–1291)
- Bernhard II, Prince (1287–1323)

- Anhalt-Zerbst (complete list) –

- Siegfried I, Prince (1252–1298)
- Albert I, Prince (1298–1316)

- Margraviate of Brandenburg (complete list) –

- Otto II the Generous, Margrave (1184–1205)
- Albert II, Margrave (1205–1220)
- John I, co-Margrave (1220–1266)
- Otto III the Pious, co-Margrave (1220–1267)

- Margraviate of Brandenburg-Stendal (complete list) –

- John II, co-Margrave (1266–1281)
- Conrad, co-Margrave (1266–1304)
- Otto IV of the Arrow, co-Margrave (1266–1308/09)
- Henry I Lackland, co-Margraviate of Brandenburg-Stendal (1294–1317), of Brandenburg (1317–1318)

- Margraviate of Brandenburg-Salzwedel (complete list) –

- John III of Prague, co-Margrave (1267–1268)
- Otto VI the Short, co-Margrave (1267–1286)
- Otto V the Tall, co-Margrave (1267–1298)
- Albert III, co-Margrave (1267–1300)
- Herman I the Tall, co-Margrave (1298/99–1308)

- Margravate of Meissen (complete list) –

- Dietrich I, Margrave (1198–1221)
- Henry III, Margrave (1221–1288)
- Albert II, Margrave (1288)
- Frederick I, Margrave (1291–1323)
- Adolf, Margrave (1293–1298)
- Albert III, Margrave (1298–1307)

- Duchy of Pomerelia (complete list) –

- Sambor I, Duke (1177/79–1205)
- Mestwin I, Duke (1205–1219/20)
- Swietopelk II, Duke (1215–1266)
- Mestwin II, Duke (1273–1294)
- Przemysł II, Duke (1294–1296)

- Pomerania-Demmin (complete list) –

- Anastasia of Greater Poland, Regent (1187–1208)
- Casimir II, Duke (1187–1219)
- Ingard of Denmark, Regent (1219–1226)
- Wartislaw III, Duke (1219–1264)

- Pomerania-Schlawe-Stolp (complete list) –

- Bogislaw III., Duke (c.1190–1223)
- Racibor II, Duke (1223–1238)

- Duchy of Pomerania, Pomerania-Stettin, Pomerania-Wolgast (complete list) –

- Anastasia of Greater Poland, Regent (1187–1208)
- Bogislaw II, Duke of Pomerania-Stettin (1187–1220)
- Miroslava of Pomerelia, Regent (1220–1226)
- Barnim I the Good, Duke of Pomerania-Stettin (1220–1264), of Pomerania (1264–1278)
- Bogislaw IV, co-Duke of Pomerania (1278–c.1295) Duke of Pomerania-Wolgast (c.1295–1309)
- Matilda of Brandenburg, Regent of Pomerania (1278–1294)
- Barnim II, co-Duke of Pomerania (1278–c.1295)
- Otto I, co-Duke of Pomeranian (1278–c.1295), Duke of Pomerania-Stettin (c.1295–1344)

- Duchy of Saxe-Wittenberg (complete list) –

- Albert II, co-Duke of Saxony (1260–1296), of Saxe-Wittenberg (1296–1298)
- Rudolph I, Duke (1298–1356), Elector (1356)

- County of Stolberg (de:complete list) –

- Friedrich zu Stolberg-Vockstedt, Count (c.1240–1282)
- Heinrich II. zu Stolberg, Count (pre-1230–1272)
- Heinrich III. zu Stolberg und Vockstedt (pre-1280–post-1296)

- Landgraviate of Thuringia (complete list) –

- Hermann I the Hard, Landgrave (1190–1217)
- Louis IV the Holy, Landgrave (1217–1227)
- Hermann II, Landgrave (1227–1241)
- Henry Raspe, Landgrave (1241–1242)
- Henry the Illustrious, Landgrave (1242–1265)
- Albert the Degenerate, Landgrave (1265–1294)
- Adolf of Nassau-Weilburg, Landgrave (1294–1298)
- Albert of Habsburg, Landgrave (1298–1307)
- Theodoric IV, Landgrave (1298–1307)
- Frederick I, Landgrave (1298–1323)

== Swabian ==
- Duchy of Swabia (complete list) –

- Philip, Duke (1196–1208)
- Frederick VII, Duke (1212–1216)
- Henry II, Duke (1216–1235)
- Conrad III, Duke (1235–1254)
- Conrad IV the Younger, Duke (1254–1268)
- Rudolf, Duke (1283–1290)
- John Parricida, Duke (1290–1309)

- Prince-Bishopric of Augsburg (complete list) –

- Udalschalk, Prince-bishop (1184–1202)
- Hartwig II, Prince-bishop (1202–1208)
- Siegfried III of Rechberg, Prince-bishop (1208–1227)
- Siboto of Seefeld, Prince-bishop (1227–1247)
- Hartmann of Dillingen, Prince-bishop (1248–1286)
- Siegfried IV of Algertshausen, Prince-bishop (1286–1288)
- Wolfhard of Roth, Prince-bishop (1288–1302)

- Margraviate of Baden-Baden (complete list) –

- Herman V, Margrave (1190–1243)
- Herman VI, Margrave (1243–1250)
- Frederick I, co-Margrave (1250–1268)
- Rudolph I, co-Margrave (1250–1288)
- Herman VII the Rouser, Margrave (1288–1291)
- Rudolph II the Elder, co-Margrave (1288–1295)
- Hesso I, co-Margrave (1288–1297)
- Rudolph III the Younger, co-Margrave (1288–1332)
- Rudolph Hesso, Margrave (1297–1335)

- Margraviate of Baden-Hachberg (complete list) –

- Henry I, Margrave (1190–1231)
- Henry II, Margrave (1231–1289)
- Henry III, Margrave (1289–1330)

- Margraviate of Baden-Eberstein (complete list) –

- Frederick II, Margrave (1291–1333)

- Margraviate of Baden-Pforzheim (complete list) –

- Herman VIII, co-Margrave (1291–1300)
- Rudolph IV, Margrave of Baden-Pforzheim (1291–1348), of Baden-Baden (1335–1348)

- Prince-Bishopric of Constance (complete list) –

- Diethelm von Krenkingen, Prince-bishop (1190–1206)
- Wernher von Staufen, Prince-bishop (1206–1209)
- Konrad von Tegerfelden, Prince-bishop (1209–1233)
- Heinrich von Tanne, Prince-bishop (1233–1248)
- Eberhard II von Waldburd-Thann, Prince-bishop (1248–1274)
- Rudolf von Habsburg-Laufenburg, Prince-bishop (1274–1293)
- Henrich von Klingenberg, Prince-bishop (1293–1306)

- Ellwangen Abbey (complete list) –

- Kuno, Prince-abbot (1188–1221)
- Adalbert III, Prince-abbot (c.1225–1240)
- Siegfried, Prince-abbot (1240–1242?)
- Rugger, Prince-abbot (1242?–1245 (1247?))
- Gotbald of Neresheim, Prince-abbot (1247–1249?)
- Rudolf, Prince-abbot (1249–1255?)
- Otto of Wülzburg, Prince-abbot (1255–1269)
- Konrad, Prince-abbot (1269–1278)
- Ekkehard of Schwabsberg, Prince-abbot (1278–1309)

- Princely Abbey of Kempten (complete list) –

- Werner of Kalbsangst, Prince-abbot (?–1208)
- Rudolf II Wolfgang of Königsegg, Prince-abbot (1208–1213)
- Henry III by Burtenbach, Prince-abbot (1213–1224)
- Henry IV of Sömmerau, Prince-abbot (1224–1234)
- Arnold, Prince-abbot (1234–1235)
- Gebhard Orteck, Prince-abbot (1235–1237)
- Friedrich V of Münster, Prince-abbot (1237–1239)
- Theothun II Birkh of Felsberg, Prince-abbot (1239–1240)
- Overger Randecker, Prince-abbot (1240–1242)
- Hartmann III Mulegg, Prince-abbot (1242–1251)
- Hugo, Prince-abbot (1251–1253)
- Ulrich III Nordlinger, Prince-abbot (1253–1255)
- Ruprecht I, Prince-abbot (1255–1268)
- Eberhard IV Burgberger, Prince-abbot (1268–1270)
- Rudolf III of Hohenegg, Prince-abbot (1270–1284)
- Guido Ritzner, Prince-abbot (1284–1286)
- Konrad III von Gundelfingen, Prince-abbot (1286–1302)

- County of Hohenberg (complete list) –

- Burkhard IV, Count (1195–1217/25)
- Burchard V, Count (1217/25–1253)
- Albrecht II, Count (1253–1298)
- Rudolf I, Count (1298–1336)

- Weingarten Abbey (complete list) –

- Hermann of Biechtenweiler, Prince-abbot (1265–1299)
- Friedrich Heller von Hellerstein, Prince-abbot (1300–1315)

- Barony of Westerburg (complete list) –

- Henry of Westerburg, Baron (?–1288)

- County of Württemberg (complete list) –

- Hartmann, Count (1181–1236)
- Ludwig III, Count (1194–1226)
- Ulrich I, Count (1241–1265)
- Ulrich II, Count (1265–1279)
- Eberhard I, Count (1279–1325)

== Italy ==
- March of Istria –

- Berthold II, Margrave (1188–1204)
- Henry II, Margrave (1204–1228)
- Otto I, Margrave (1228–1234)
- Otto II, Margrave (1234–1248)

- Republic of Lucca –

- Bonifazio Giudice di Vallecchia, Captain of the People (1251–1252)

- Milan (complete list) –

- Martino della Torre, Signore (1259–1263)
- Napoleone della Torre, Signore (1265–1277)
- Ottone, Signore (1277–1294)
- Matteo I, Signore (1294–1302, 1311–1322)

- Principality of Orange (complete list) –

- William I, co-Prince (1180–pre–1219)
- William II, co-Prince (1180–c.1239)
- William III, co-Prince (c.1239–1257)
- Raymond I, co-Prince (c.1218–1282)
- Bertrand IV, Prince (1282–c.1314)

- Papal States (complete list) –

- Innocent III, Pope (1198–1216)
- Honorius III, Pope (1216–1227)
- Gregory IX, Pope (1227–1241)
- Celestine IV, Pope (1241)
- Innocent IV, Pope (1243–1254)
- Alexander IV, Pope (1254–1261)
- Urban IV, Pope (1261–1264)
- Clement IV, Pope (1265–1268)
- Gregory X, Pope (1271–1276)
- Innocent V, Pope (1276)
- Adrian V, Pope (1276)
- John XXI, Pope (1276–1277)
- Nicholas III, Pope (1277–1280)
- Martin IV, Pope (1281–1285)
- Honorius IV, Pope (1285–1287)
- Nicholas IV, Pope (1288–1292)
- Celestine V, Pope (1294)
- Boniface VIII, Pope (1294–1303)

- County of Savoy (complete list) –

- Thomas, Count (1189–1233)
- Amadeus IV, Count (1233–1253)
- Boniface, Count (1253–1263)
- Peter II the Little Charlemagne, Count (1263–1268)
- Philip I, Count (1268–1285)
- Amadeus V the Great, Count (1285–1323)
