= Richiza =

Richiza can refer to one of:

- Richeza of Poland, Queen of Sweden (1116-1156)
- Rikissa Birgersdotter, Queen of Norway (c. 1237 – after 1288)
