= Kobern (lordship) =

Kobern was a lordship (Herrschaft) centred on a castle on the Lower Moselle near its confluence with the Rhine in the Electorate of Trier in the Holy Roman Empire. Attested for the first time in 1129, the lordship passed by marriage of the heiress of the original line to a scion of the counts of Isenburg by 1189. This created the line of Isenburg-Kobern, often called counts (Grafen).

There is no agreement among scholars about the chronology of the lower castle (Niederburg) and the upper castle (Oberburg) at Kobern, whether either, both or neither were constructed by the original baronial family. Kobern seems to have been an imperial castle at first. Sometime between 1192 and 1197, there was a controversy between Gerlach III von Isenburg (who was Gerlach I of Kobern by marriage) and Archbishop John I over the castles. This was resolved by Gerlach turning the castles over to the archbishop and receiving them back as a fief. Gerlach I and his son and successor Gerlach II expropriated property of the Abbey of St. Marien, leading to another settlement with Archbishop John in 1207, in which Gerlach I is referred to merely as ville [Covernae] advocatus, that is, the archbishop's Vogt.

When Heinrich II died in 1269, he was succeeded by his brother-in-law, Friedrich II of Neuerburg. The male line of Isenburg-Kobern went extinct in 1301. The three daughters of the last lord—Kunigunde, Mechald and Jutta. who had married, respectively, Arnold von Pettingen, Johann von Sayn and Salentin von Isenburg—sold the lordship, including both castles, to Archbishop Balduin of Trier between 1347 and 1351. This gave the archbishopric land along the Rhine for the first time. The former lordship became the Amt Kobern.

== Lords ==
- Ludwig, a ministerialis and possibly not truly lord of Kobern
- Heinrich I
- Gerlach I (fl. 1189–1207), married a daughter of Heinrich
- Gerlach II, son of Gerlach I, married Jutta of the Hochstaden family
- Heinrich II (died 1269), son of Gerlach II, married Mechthildis
- Caecilia, daughter of Gerlach II, married Friedrich I von Neuerburg, who died in 1258
- Friedrich II (fl. 1272–1277), son of Caecilia, married Irmengard of Esch
- Robin, son of Friedrich II
- Friedrich III, son of Friedrich II

== Sources ==
- Haas, Jochen (2009). "Controversia quae vertebatur inter ipsos de aedificatione castri in Aldenburg: Zum Datierungsproblem der Ersterbauung der beiden Höhenburgen von Kobern an der Untermosel, Gemeinde Kobern-Gondorf, Landkreis Mayen-Koblenz (Rheinland-Pfalz)". Burgen und Schlösser. 2: 102–110.
- Köbler, Gerhard (2007). Historisches Lexikon der Deutschen Länder: die deutschen Territorien vom Mittelalter bis zur Gegenwart (7th rev. ed.). Munich: C. H. Beck.
