= Bernhard I of Werle =

- Born: c. 1245
- Died: c. 1286
- Buried: Doberan Minster
- Noble family: House of Mecklenburg
- Father: Nicholas I of Werle
- Mother: Jutta of Anhalt

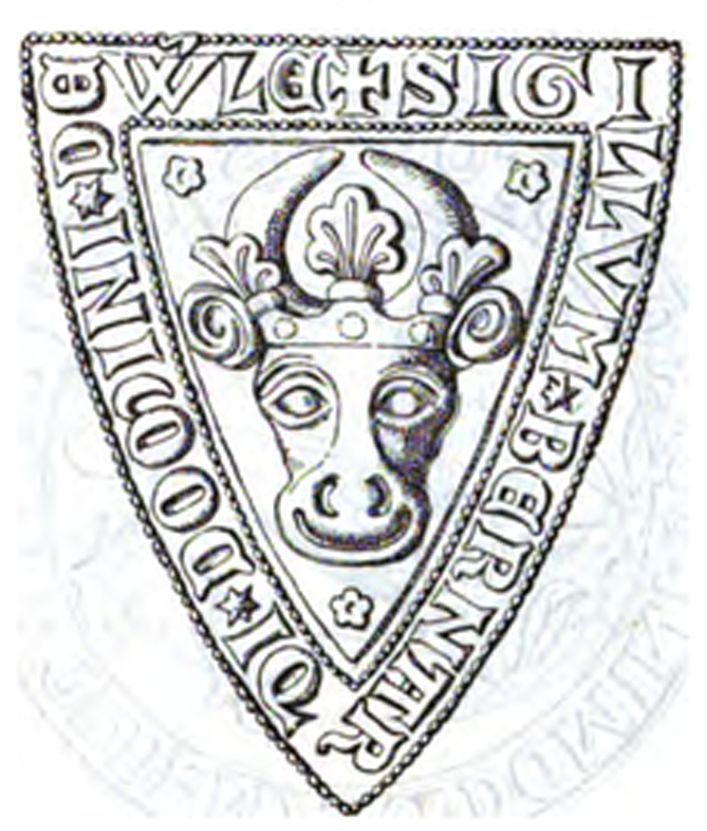
The seal of Bernard I of Werle.

Bernhard I, Lord of Werle (c. 1245 – c. 1286), was Lord of Werle from 1277 to 1281 and lord of Prisannewitz from 1281 until his death. He was the son of Nicholas I of Werle and his wife, Jutta of Anhalt. He was first mentioned in a document in 1273.

After his father's death in 1277 he initially ruled Werle jointly with his brothers Henry I and John I. In 1281 it was decided to divide the principality and Bernhard took over control of the Prisannewitz section. He was last mentioned as being alive on 9 March 1282; on 3 March 1288, he was mentioned as "deceased" by his nephew Nicholas II. He probably died in 1286. He was buried in the Doberan Minster.

No spouse or issue have been documented.

== Sources ==
- Wigger, Friedrich (1885). "Stammtafeln des Großherzoglichen Hauses von Meklenburg". Jahrbücher des Vereins für Mecklenburgische Geschichte und Altertumskunde. 50: 111–326.
