= Kobern-Gondorf =

- Municipality
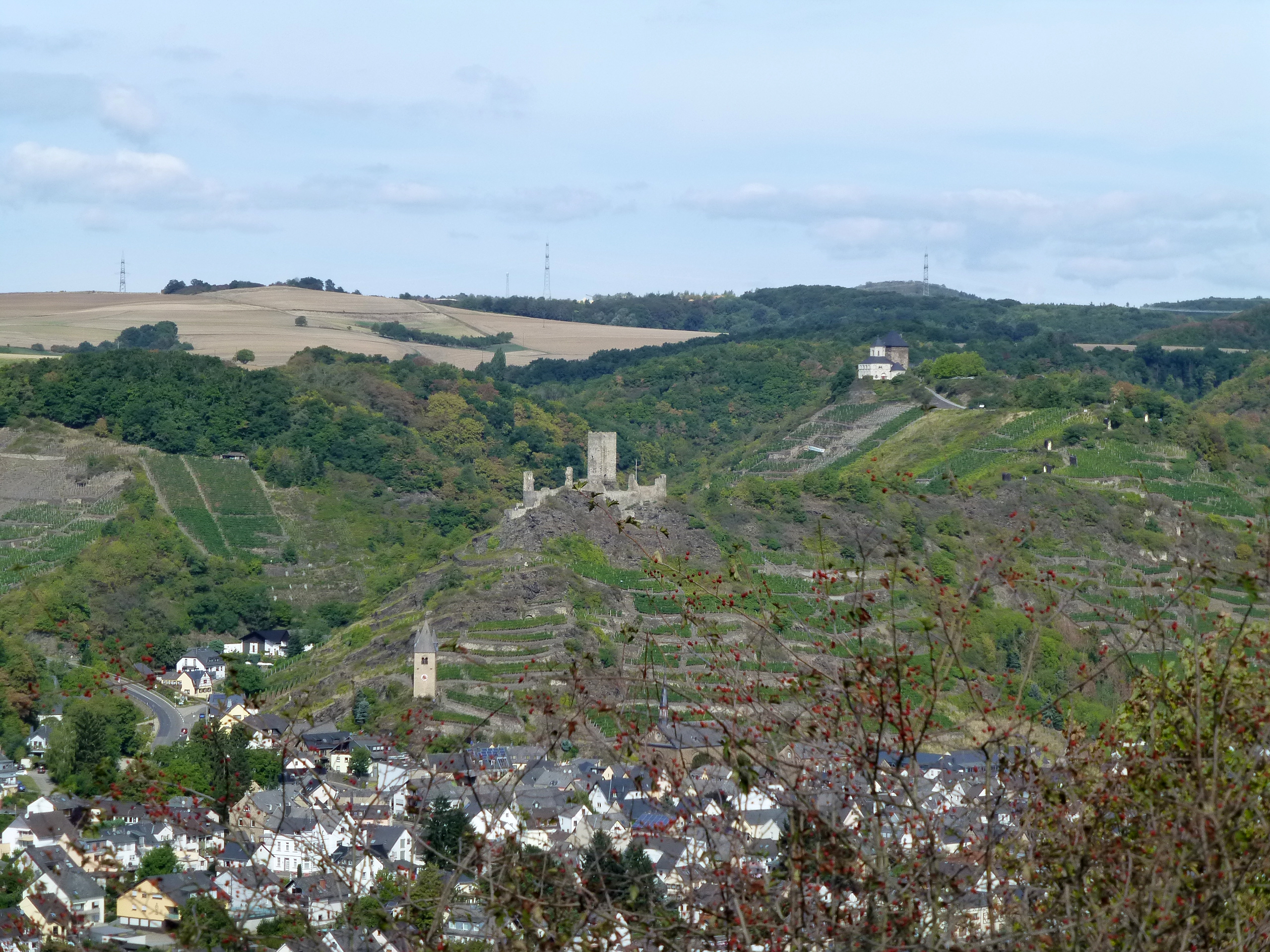
- Kobern with its lower and upper castles

- Coat of arms

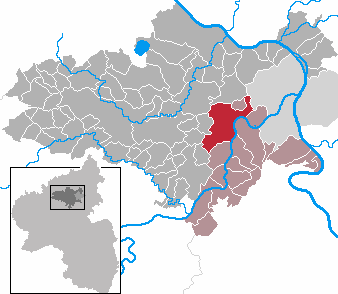
- Location of Kobern-Gondorf within Mayen-Koblenz district
- Interactive map of Kobern-Gondorf
- Location within Germany Location within Rhineland-Palatinate
- Coordinates: 50°18′17″N 7°27′26″E
- Country: Germany
- State: Rhineland-Palatinate
- District: Mayen-Koblenz
- Municipal assoc.: Rhein-Mosel
- Subdivisions: 3

Government
  - Mayor (2019–24): Michael Dötsch

Area
  - Total: 28.36 km^{2} (10.95 sq mi)
- Elevation: 70–300 m (230–980 ft)

Population (2025-12-31)
  - Total: 2,970
  - Density: 105/km^{2} (271/sq mi)
- Time zone: UTC+01:00 (CET)
  - Summer (DST): UTC+02:00 (CEST)
- Postal codes: 56330
- Dialling codes: 02607
- Vehicle registration: MYK
- Website: www.kobern-gondorf.de

Kobern-Gondorf is a municipality in the district of Mayen-Koblenz in Rhineland-Palatinate, western Germany. It is the seat of the Verbandsgemeinde Rhein-Mosel.

Above the village are the two castles of Niederburg and Oberburg. It was the seat of the medieval lordship of Kobern.

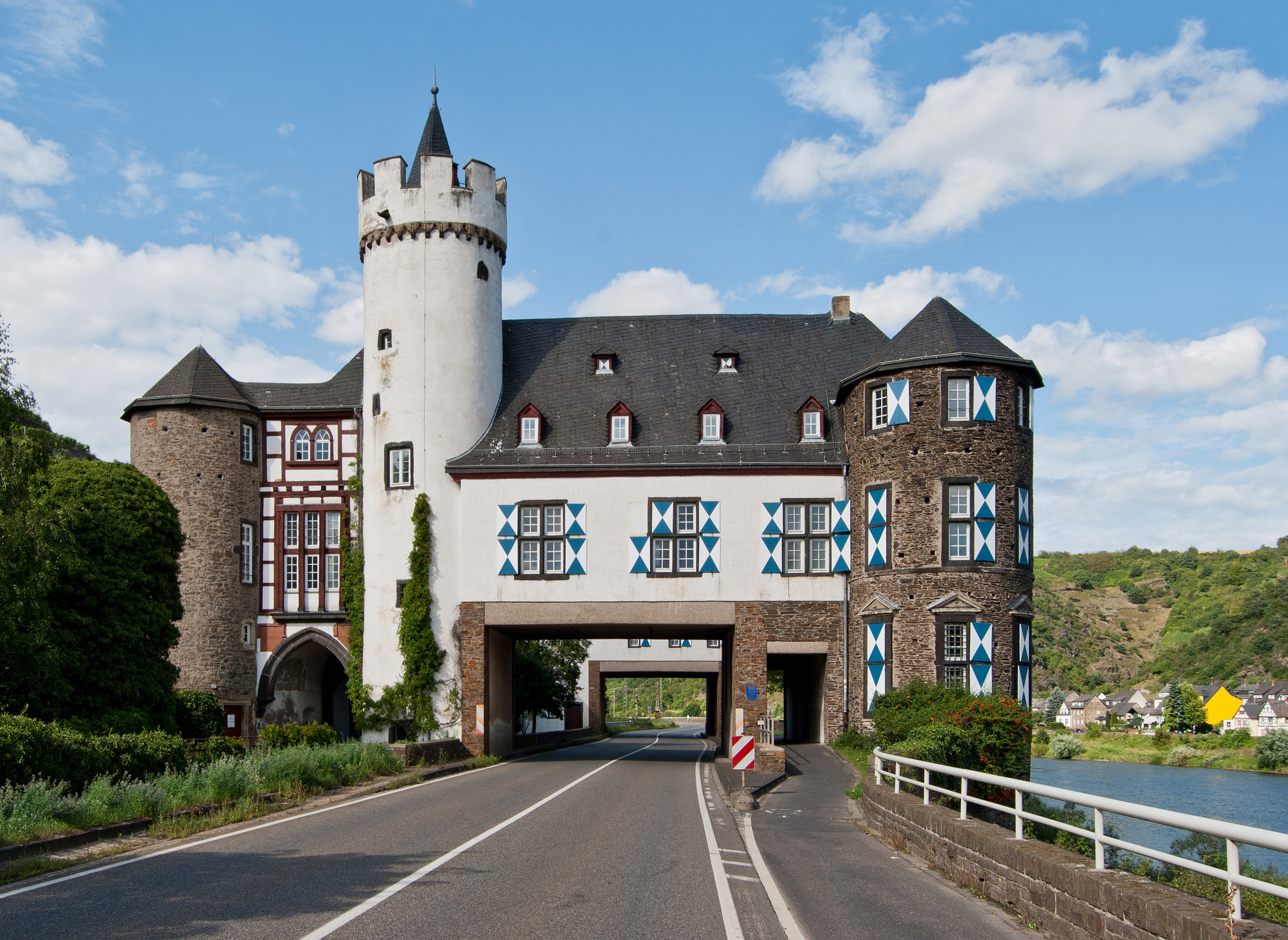
Gondorf Castle: street breach of the federal highway Bundesstraße 416
