= Margaret Skulesdatter =

Queen of Norway from 1225 to 1263

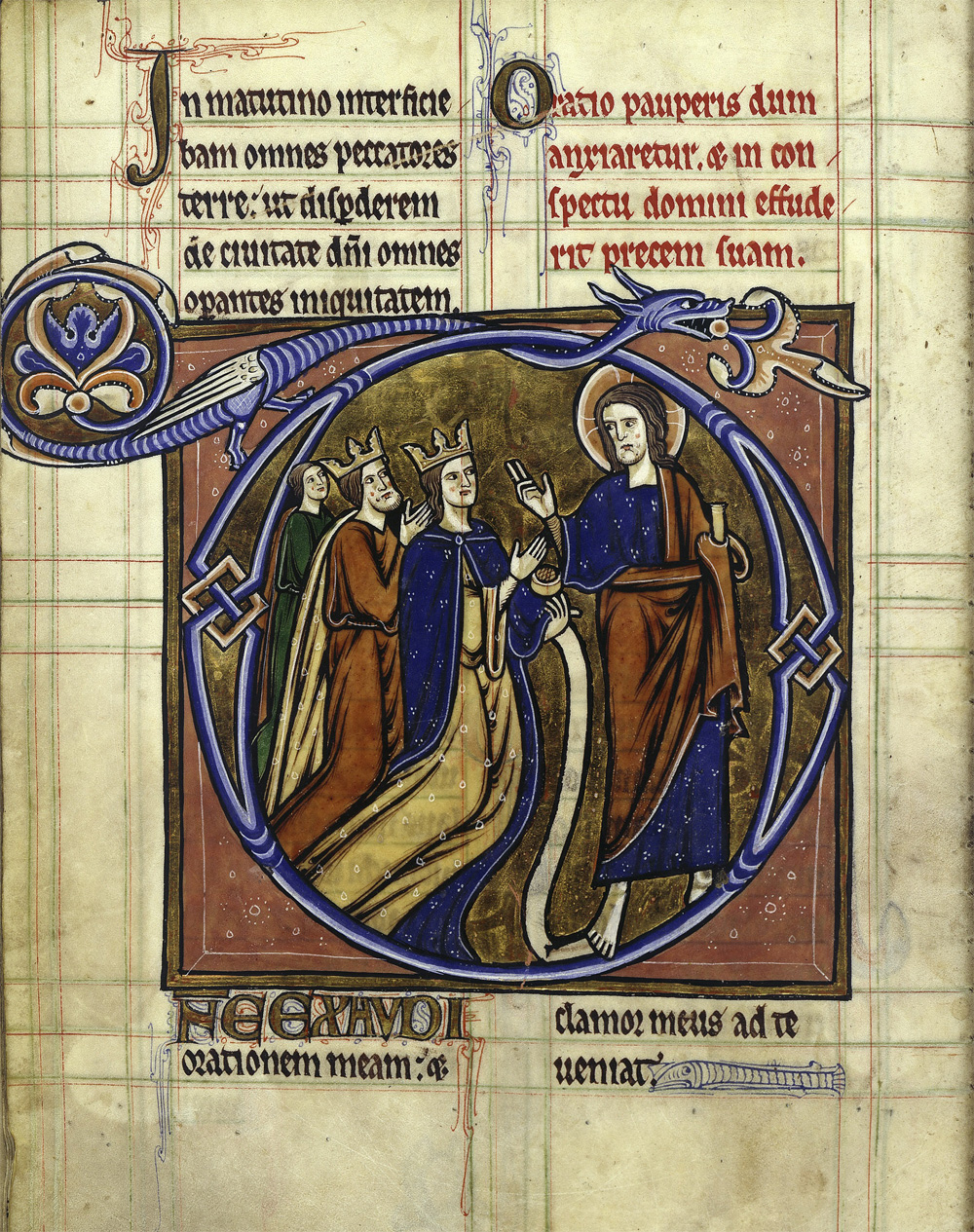
- Initial from a psalter probably owned by Margarete, showing Christ blessing a royal bridal couple

Queen consort of Norway
- Tenure: 25 May 1225 – 16 December 1263
- Coronation: 29 July 1247 (Bergen)
- Born: 1208
- Died: 1270 (aged 61–62); Norway
- Spouse: Haakon IV of Norway
- Issue: Haakon the Young; Christina, Lady of Valecorneja; Magnus VI of Norway
- House: Godwin
- Father: Skule Bårdsson
- Mother: Ragnhild

Margaret Skulesdatter (Old Norse: Margrét Skúladóttir) (1208–1270) was a Norwegian queen consort, spouse of King Haakon IV of Norway and queen consort of Norway from 1225 to 1263.

== Biography ==
Margrete was the daughter of Jarl Skule Bårdsson and Ragnhild. The marriage was arranged as part of an attempt to reconcile her father with King Haakon Haakonsson. The main reason was to prevent her father from enforcing his claim to the throne, which he had given up after the election of Haakon in 1217. The engagement was celebrated at the royal residence in Bergen in 1219, and the wedding took place there on 25 May 1225.

However, in 1239, the conflict between her father and husband erupted into open warfare, when Skule had himself proclaimed king in Nidaros. The rebellion ended in 1240 when Skule was put to death. According to the Haakon Saga (Codex Frisianus), Margaret burst into tears when she was informed of her father's rebellion, and mourned his death greatly. It is uncertain whether her husband allowed her to inherit from her father, whose property had been confiscated after his rebellion. It is known, however, that Margaret asked the Pope to take some estates under his protection, estates that Haakon granted Margaret after his coronation in 1247. It is possible that these estates previously belonged to her father and would have been her inheritance.

Queen Margrete is not described very closely as a person, and does not appear to have participated in politics, though she apparently protected her economic rights. She does seem to have accompanied her spouse on his travels around the country and to have played an active role as a queen. In 1238 and 1240, she was given an official gift of red fabric by Henry III of England, and it is possible that the illustrated English psalm book found in Norway from this age was a gift to her. Margrete seems to have shown a particular interest in Stavanger. She was engaged in a conflict with the bishop of Stavanger, a conflict which was solved by Cardinal William of Sabina, who granted her patronage rights over three chapels in Stavanger, one of them possibly Peterskirken (1247). Margrete was also, at an unknown date before 1245, the first witness to Haakon's official confirmation of the authority of the church and the crown over Stavanger.

She became a widow in 1263. In the autumn of 1264, she accompanied her son Magnus on a visit to Rissa Abbey in Trøndelag, which was founded by her father, and where she likely spent her last years from 1267.

=== Issue ===
1. Olav (Óláfr) (born 1226, date of death unknown). Died in infancy.
2. Haakon (Hákon) (Haakon the Young) (1232–1257). Married Rikitsa Birgersdóttir, daughter of the Swedish jarl Birger. Was appointed king and co-ruler by his father in 1239, he died before his father.
3. Christina (Kristín) (1234-1262). Married the Castilian infante, Philip, brother of King Alfonso X of Castile in 1258. She died childless.
4. Magnus (Magnús) (1238–1280). Was appointed king and co-ruler following the death of Håkon the Young. Crowned as king in 1261 on the occasion of his wedding to the Danish princess Ingibjörg.

Vacant Title last held by Margaret of Sweden	Queen consort of Norway; 1225–1263	Succeeded by Rikissa Birgersdotter
