= Niederburg, Kobern =

Niederburg Kobern
- Niedernburg, Unterburg, Neue Burg
- Kobern-Gondorf
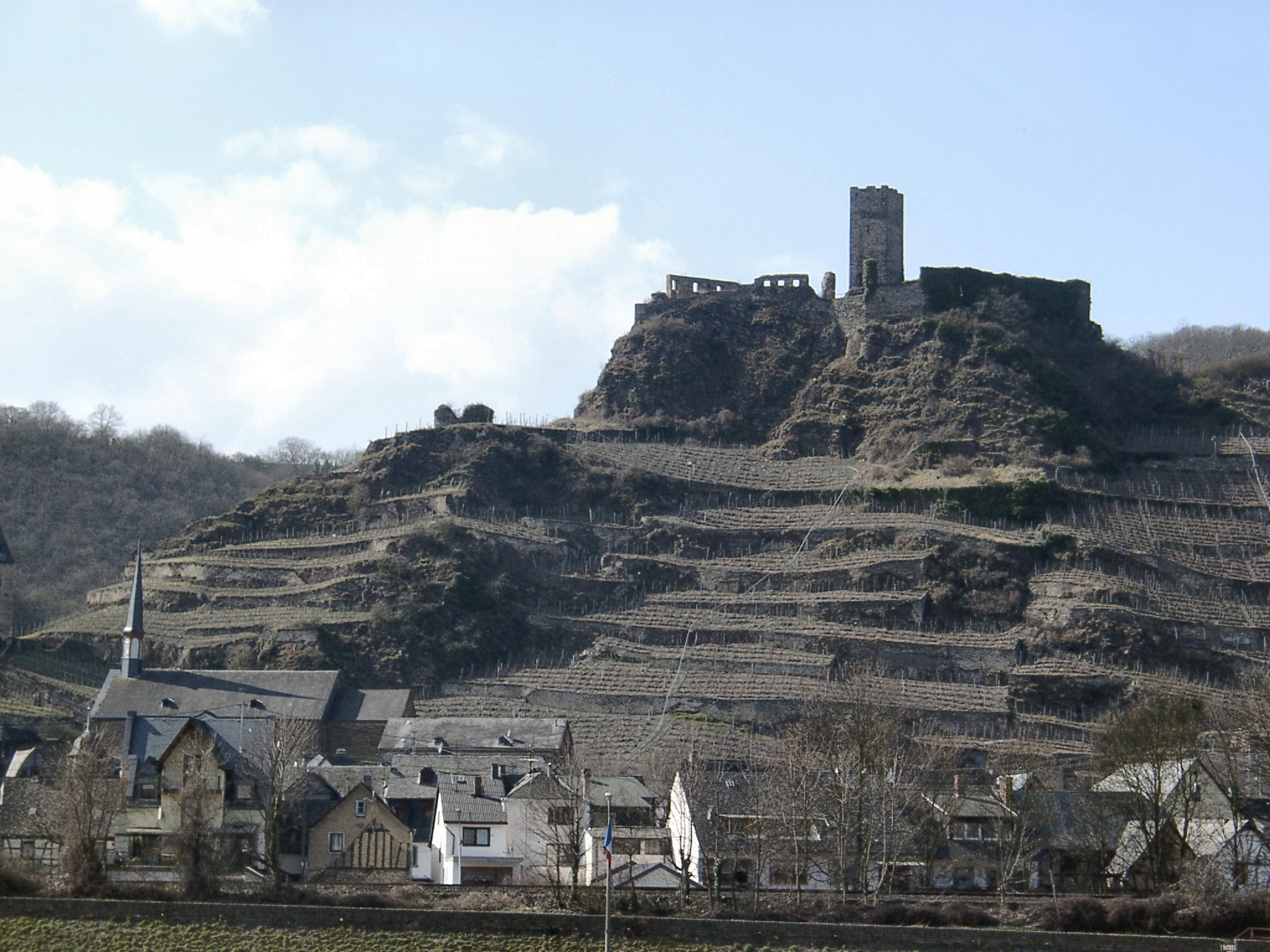
- The Niederburg from the far shore of the Moselle

Site information
- Type: hill castle
- Code: DE-RP
- Condition: bergfried, enceinte

Location
- Coordinates: 50°18′38.27″N 7°27′20.4″E
- Height: 150 m above sea level (NHN)

Site history
- Built: 1100 bis 1200

Garrison information
- Occupants: nobles, clerics

The Niederburg ("Lower Castle") at Kobern, also called the Niedernburg, Unterburg or Neue Burg, is a hill castle above the municipality of Kobern-Gondorf in the county of Mayen-Koblenz in the German state of Rhineland-Palatinate.

== Location ==
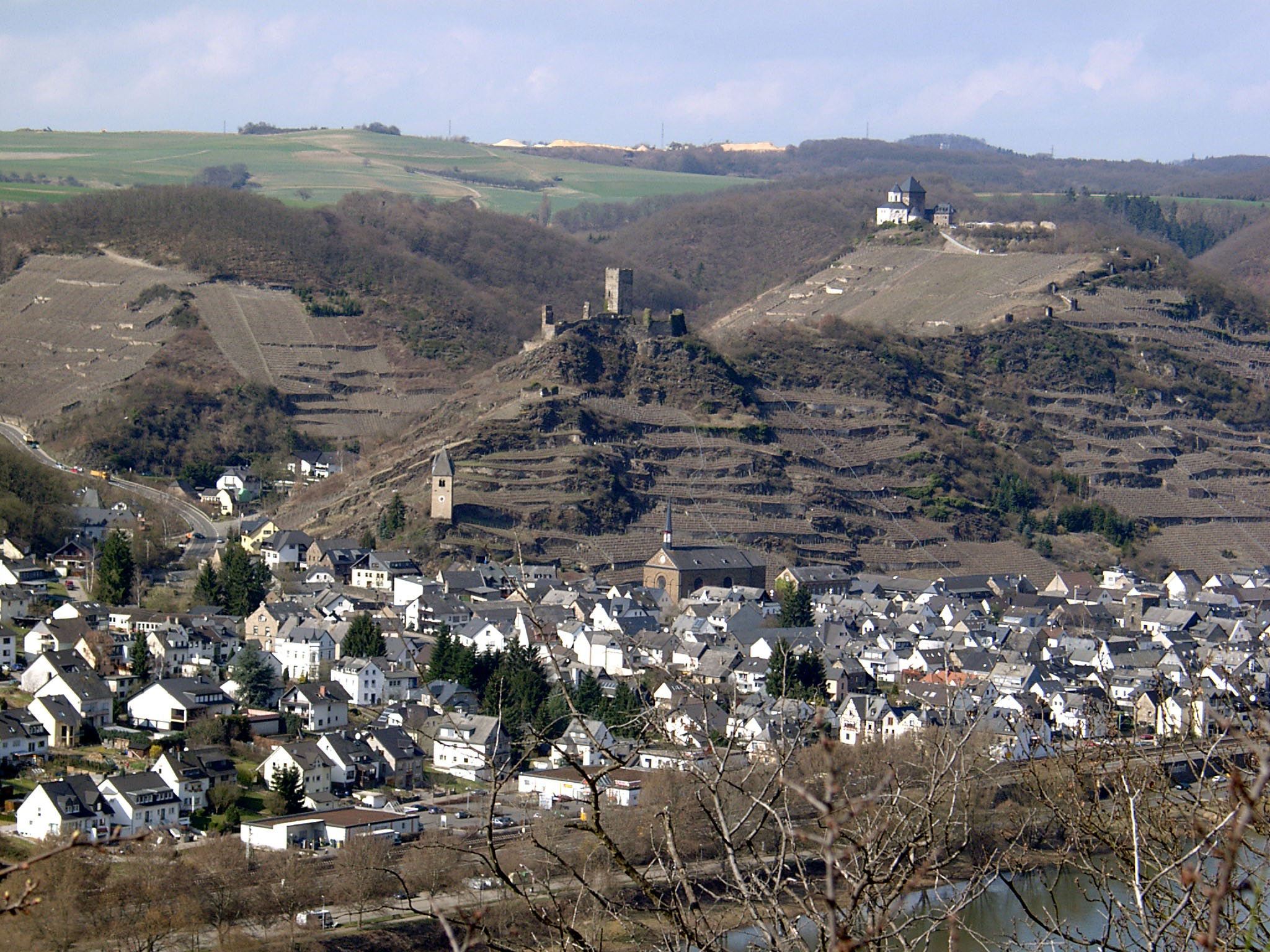
The Niederburg (left) and Oberburg (right)

The ruins of the Niederburg stand at a height of about 150 metres above the village of Kobern on a hill ridge that points towards the Moselle. On the same ridge and about 50 metres higher, is the Oberburg ("Upper Castle") and St. Matthias' Chapel.

== Description ==
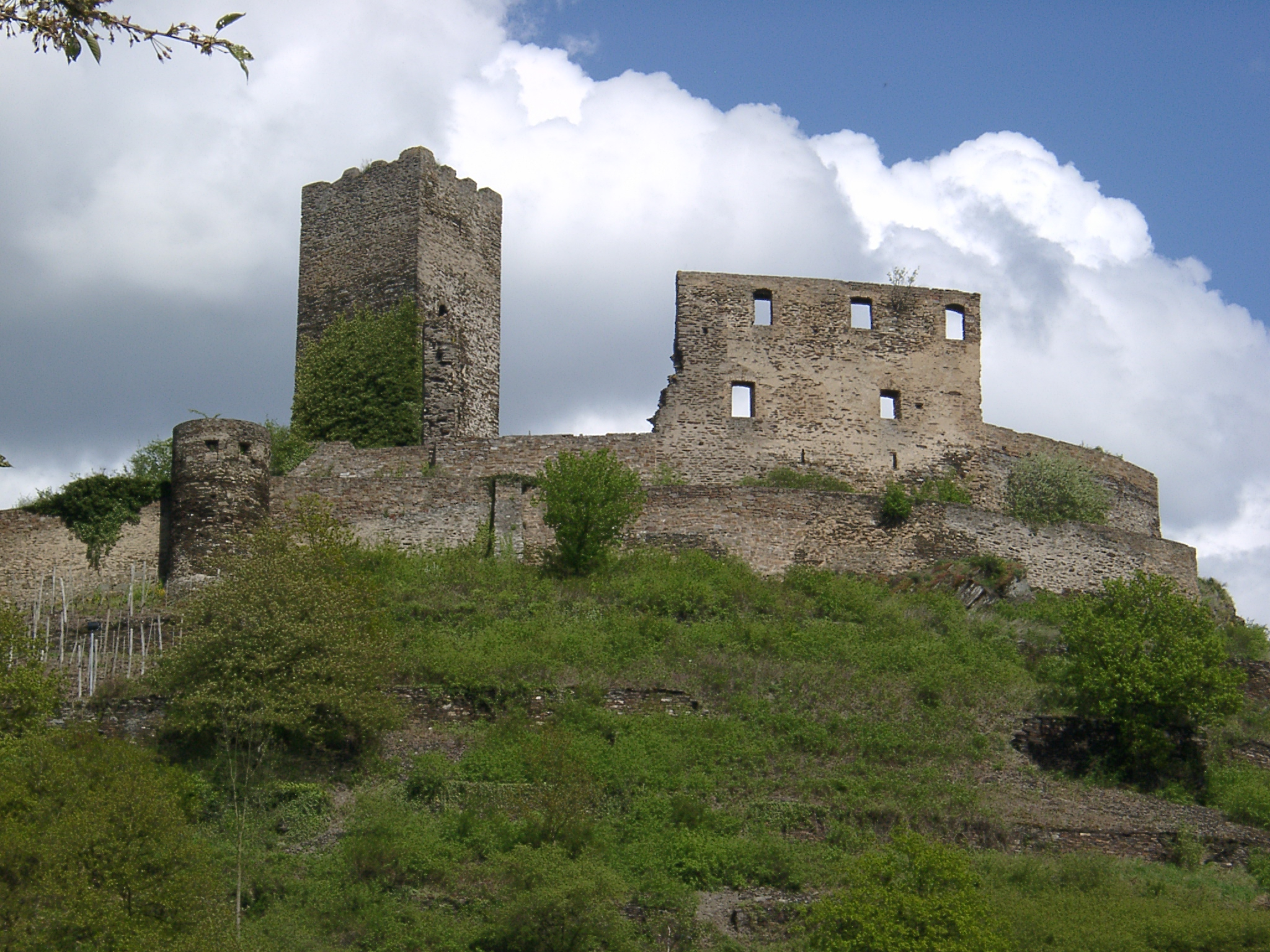
The Niederburg seen from Maifeld

The castle has an amygdaloidal ground plan. It has a three-storey, 20-metre-high bergfried, measuring 7.5 x 8 metres, with an elevated entrance at a height of 10 metres. There are also the remains of a two-storey, Late Gothic palas. A wall tower and a cistern are also well preserved and there are significant portions of the outer walls. The castle was guarded to the west by a curtain wall with a zwinger and to the north by a throat ditch. The upper third of the bergfried and the battlements were rebuilt in the 19th century. Between 1976 and 1978, the state castle administration reconstructed and enhanced the palas and the cistern between the two towers.

== History ==
The castle was built in the mid-12th century. It is first recorded in 1195, when the then Burgherr made it a fiefdom of the Electorate of Trier. The female line of the lords of Isenburg-Kobern died out in the 13th century. The Kobern Castles and associated lordship passed via the heiress, Cecilia, to Frederick II of Neuerburg (a side line of the counts of Vianden). In 1309 the male line of this family also died out. Thereafter the castle and lordship was sold to the Archbishop of Trier. In 1688 the castle was destroyed.

== Visiting ==
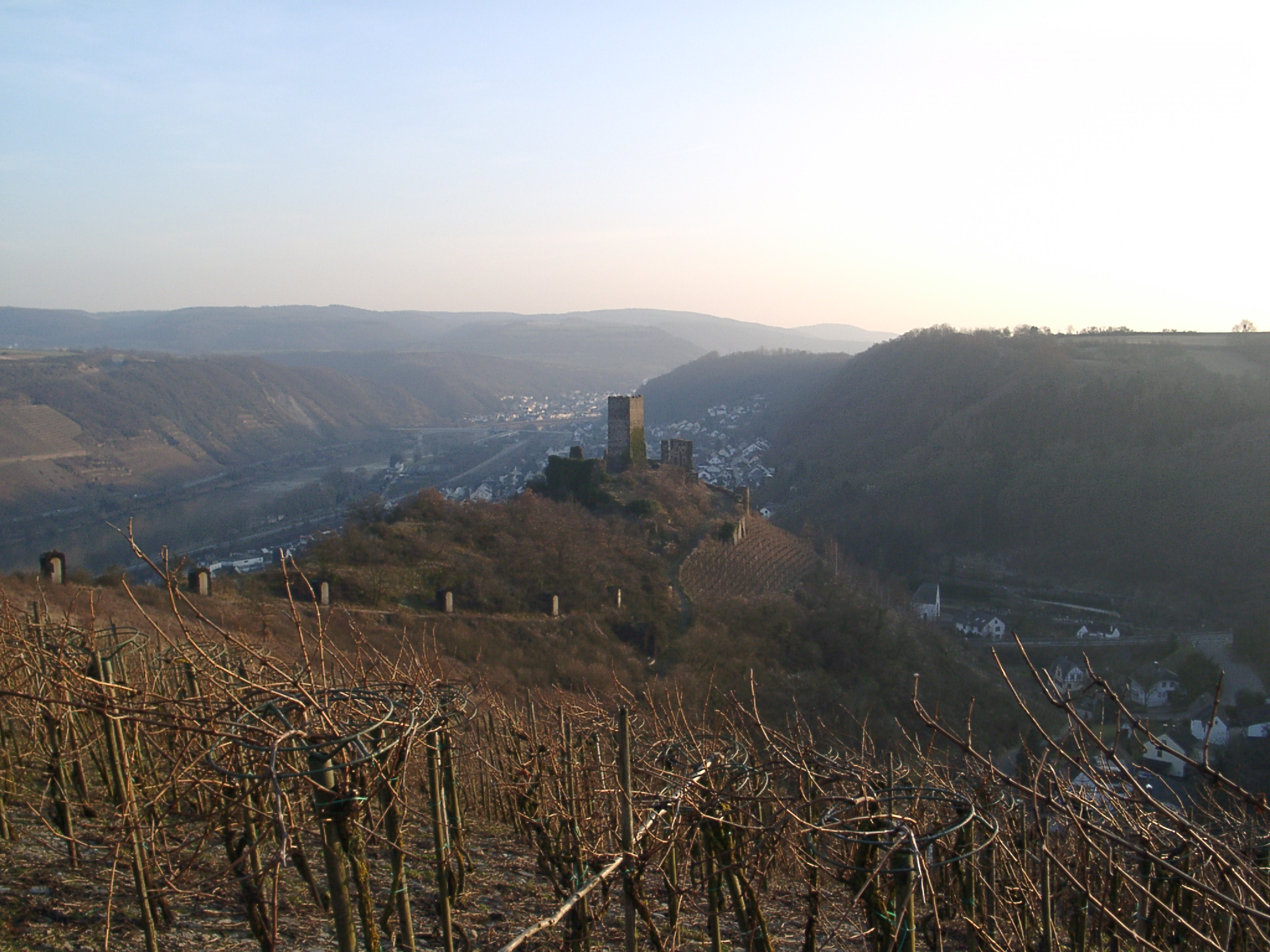
The Niederburg above Kobern

The castle is open to the public all year round and may be visited free of charge.

Visitors may climb up to the castle on a footpath from the Mühlbach valley.

== Monument protection ==
The Niederburg is a protected cultural monument.

== Literature ==
- Ortsgemeinde Kobern-Gondorf (publ.): Kobern-Gondorf. 1980.
- Landesamt für Denkmalpflege - Burgen, Schlösser, Altertümer Rheinland-Pfalz (publ.), Führer der staatlichen Schlösserverwaltung des Landesamtes für Denkmalpflege Rheinland-Pfalz, Führungsheft 7, Mainz, 1999
- Das Mittelrheinische Becken. Edition no. 1 Böhlau, Cologne; Weimar; Vienna 2003, ISBN 3-412-10102-8 (Werte der deutschen Heimat. Vol. 65).
