= John I of Holstein-Kiel =

John I, Count of Holstein-Kiel
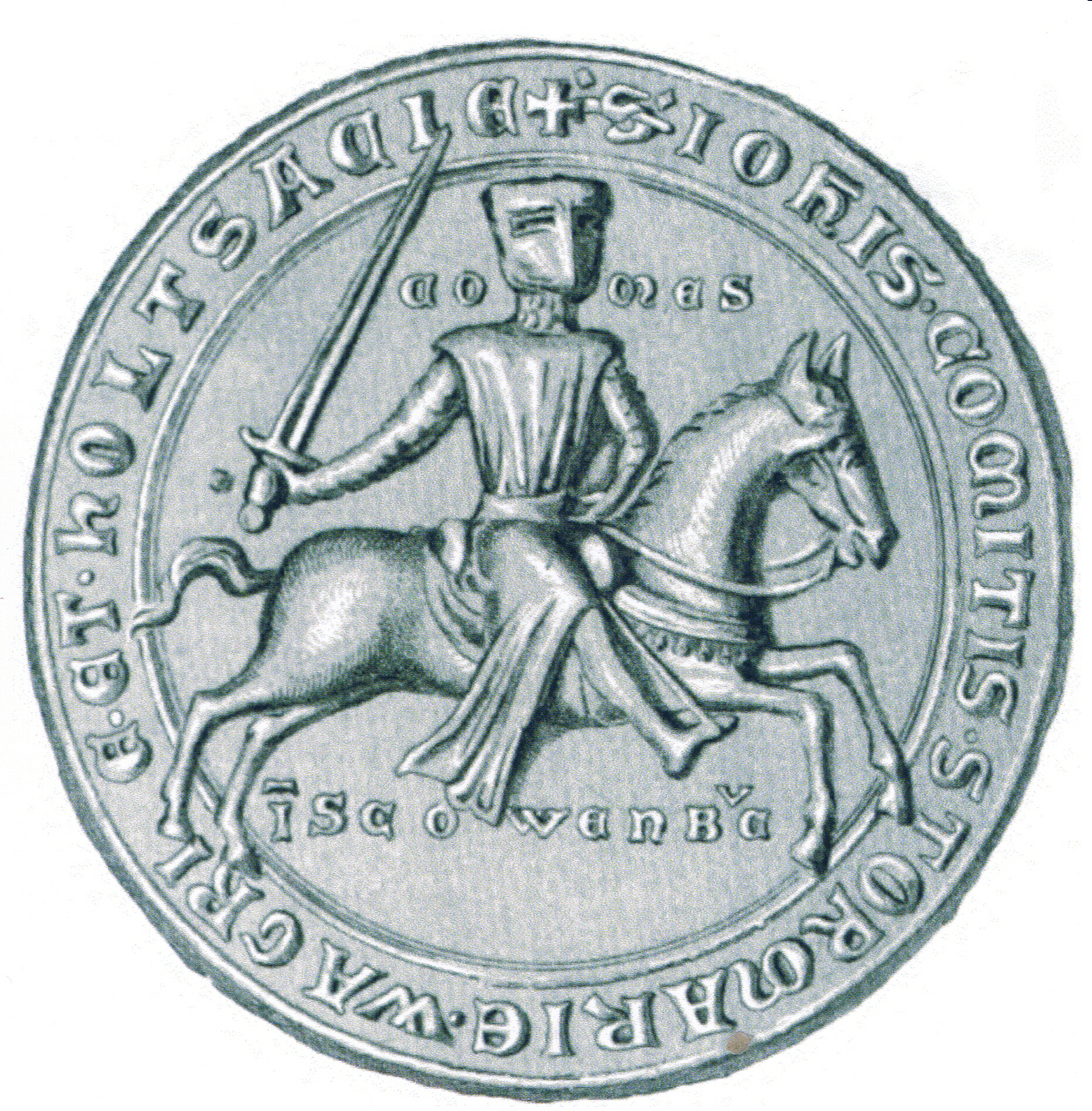
- Seal of John I, from the period 1247-1259
- Born: c. 1229
- Died: 20 April 1263
- Noble family: House of Schauenburg
- Spouse: Elisabeth of Saxe-Wittenberg
- Issue: Adolph V John II; Agnes of Holstein-Kiel
- Father: Adolf IV of Holstein
- Mother: Heilwig of Lippe

John I, Count of Holstein-Kiel (c. 1229 – 20 April 1263) was a member of the House of Schauenburg. He was Count of Holstein-Kiel from 1261 until his death.

== Life ==
John was the eldest son of Count Adolf IV of Schauenburg and Holstein and his wife Heilwig of Lippe. After his father retired to the monastery in 1239, John ruled jointly with his younger brother Gerhard I, initially under regency. He was constantly embroiled in disputes with his brother and the Bishop of Minden. In 1255, they signed a trade agreement with Lübeck.

In 1261, the county was divided. John received Wagria, East Holstein and Segeberg; his brother received Stormarn, Plön and Schaumburg. John chose Kiel as his residence; Gerhard chose Itzehoe. When Denmark ceded Rendsburg, it went to Gerhard.

John died in 1263. After his death, his sons ruled jointly under the regency of their uncle Gerhard. However, in 1273, they divided their territory into Holstein-Segeberg and Holstein-Kiel. When Adolf died without an heir in 1308, the two parts were reunited.

== Seal ==
The inscription in his seal read: S (IGILLUM) * IOH (ANN) * IS * STORM Comitis WAGRIE * ARIA * ET * HOLTSACIE (Seal of John, Count of Stormarn, Wagria and Holstein).

In the middle: SCOVENBG COMES(Count of Schauenburg)

== Marriage and issue ==
John married in 1249 or 1250 to Elisabeth (died between 1293 and 1306), a daughter of Duke Albert I of Saxony. They had six children.

- Elisabeth (d. 1284), married Count Nicholas I of Schwerin-Wittenburg (d. 1323)
- Heilwig (c. 1251 – before 1308), married in 1262 to Margrave Otto IV of Brandenburg (c. 1238 – 1308 or 1309)
- Adolph V (c. 1252 – 1308), married Euphemia of Pomerania (d. after 1316).
- John II (1253-1321)
- Agnes (d. 1286/1287), married Lord Waldemar of Rostock (before 1262 – 1282)
- Albert (d. 1300), from 1283 provost in Hamburg

== Notes ==
John I of Holstein-Kiel House of Schauenburg Born: c. 1229 Died: 20 April 1263
Regnal titles
Preceded by Adolphus IV	Count of Holstein; Count of Schaumburg; 1238-1261 with his brother Gerhard I (1238-1261)	Succeeded by Gerhard I as Count of Schaumburg
Preceded by Adolphus IV	Count of Holstein; Count of Schaumburg; 1238-1261 with his brother Gerhard I (1238-1261)	partition of Holstein among the brothers
New title Holstein-Kiel partitioned from Holstein	Count of Holstein-Kiel; 1261-1263	Succeeded by John II and Adolphus V
