= Rikissa Birgersdotter =

Queen of Norway from 1251 to 1257

Queen consort of Norway
- Tenure: 1251–1257
- Born: c. 1237; Sweden
- Died: after 1288
- Spouse: Haakon Haakonsson the Young; Henry I of Werle
- Issue: Sverre Haakonson of Norway; Henry II of Werle; Nicholas of Werle-Güstrow; Rixa, Duchess of Brunswick-Göttingen
- House: House of Bjälbo
- Father: Birger Jarl
- Mother: Ingeborg Eriksdotter of Sweden

Rikissa Birgersdotter, also known as Rixa, Richeza, Richilda and Regitze, (c. 1237 – after 1288) was Queen of Norway as the wife of the co-king Haakon Haakonson, and later Princess of Werle as wife of Henry I, Prince of Mecklenburg-Güstrow.

== Biography ==
Rikissa Birgersdotter was born as one of the eldest children in the marriage of Lord Birger Magnusson (better known as Birger Jarl), later riksjarl and regent of Sweden, and Princess Ingeborg Eriksdotter, eldest sibling of King Erik Eriksson of Sweden.

Rikissa's parentage is historically well attested, contrary to that of her supposed younger sisters. Rikissa received her name in honor of her maternal grandmother, the late Rikissa of Denmark, queen of Sweden – the Scandinavian custom was to give names of deceased grandmothers to daughters of a family, and a first-born daughter was usually christened as namesake of maternal grandmother, if she was no longer alive.

In 1250, her uncle, King Erik, died without heirs and her underage brother Valdemar was elected king, with his father Birger as the regent. Birger's policy included efforts to keep the peace between Scandinavia's three kingdoms and to strengthen his own already powerful family's influence. Thus his legitimate children were all considered de facto Swedish princes and princesses through their mother and through Birger's own royal ancestry.

In 1251, Rikissa was married to the heir of Norway, Haakon Haakonsson the Young (1232–1257), titular king of Norway and co-ruler along his father king Haakon IV of Norway. Haakon and Rikissa had one son, Sverre Håkonsson who died young (1252–1261). Her husband King Haakon died in 1257 prior to his father's death in 1263, leaving his younger brother, Magnus VI of Norway (Magnus Lagabøte) as the heir-apparent to the kingdom.

In 1262, the Dowager Queen of Norway was married to Henry of Mecklenburg, Prince of Werle (d. 1291). She had several children in her second marriage.

== Issue ==
- Heinrich II von Werle (died 1308)
- Nikolaus von Werle (died 1298)
- Rikissa av Mecklenburg-Werle (died 1312) married Albert II, Duke of Brunswick-Göttingen

== Speculations ==
Chronica principum Saxonie mentions Rikissa as daughter of King of Sweden (filia regis Suecie), which title has caused consternation among later researchers. This has been explained by suggesting that:

- Rikissa was the granddaughter of king Eric X of Sweden
- the term in the chronicle just refers to "royal family of Sweden".
- during King Valdemar's minority, the all-powerful riksjarl and regent appeared to be a king to the writer of that chronicle
- upon Valdemar's accession to the royal throne, their mother Ingeborg, through whose lineage the crown was generally perceived to have come, was regarded as queen mother, despite never having been queen regnant or queen consort.

== Other sources ==
- Cronica Principum Saxonie, MGH SS XXV, sida 476
- Lars O. Lagerqvist (1982). "Sverige och dess regenter under 1.000 år", ("Sweden and its regents under a 1000 years") (in Swedish). Albert Bonniers Förlag AB. ISBN 91-0-075007-7.

Preceded by Margaret Skulesdatter	Queen consort of Norway; 1251–1257	Succeeded by Ingeborg of Denmark
