= Adolph V of Holstein-Segeberg =

Count of Holstein-Segeberg

Adolph V, Count of Holstein-Segeberg
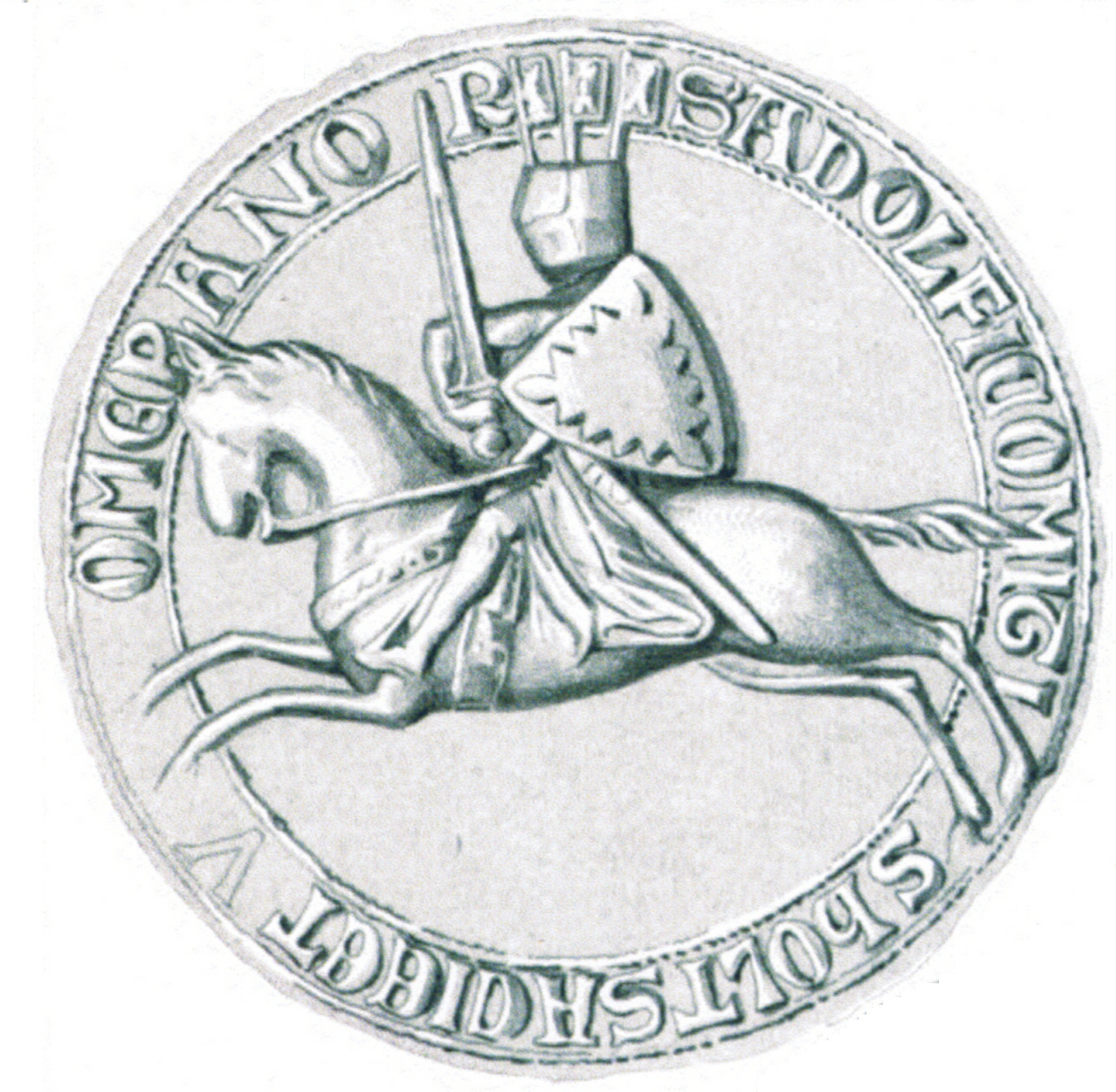
- Seal of Adolf V from around 1273
- Born: c. 1252
- Died: 1308
- Noble family: House of Schauenburg
- Spouse: Euphemia of Pomerania-Wolgast
- Father: John I, Count of Holstein-Kiel
- Mother: Elisabeth of Saxe-Wittenberg

Adolph V, Count of Holstein-Segeberg (c. 1252 – 1308) was the ruling count of Holstein-Kiel from 1263 to 1273 and of Holstein-Segeberg from 1273 until his death.

== Life ==
He was the elder of the two sons of Count John I of Holstein-Kiel and Elizabeth of Saxe-Wittenberg.

In 1273, the county was divided between Adolph V and his younger brother John II on the one hand, and their uncle Gerhard I on the other hand. Gerhard I received Holstein-Itzehoe; Adolph V and John II then divided their share between themselves, with Adolph V receiving the river Elbe and Great Lake Plön and extensive estates along the Lower Elbe north-west of Hamburg. Adolph V then styled himself "Count of Holstein and Stormarn". He resided at Siegesburg Castle in Segeberg, which was the largest castle in the county. His part of the county is called Holstein-Segeberg by historians.

Adolph V died in 1308. Since he had no male heir, Holstein-Segeberg fell to his nephew Adolph VII, the son of John II. However, Adolph VII was killed in a private revenge in 1315. Holstein-Segeberg then fell to John II. When John II died in 1316, Holstein-Segeberg was divided between the two remaining Count of Holstein: Gerhard III of Holstein-Rendsburg and Adolph VII of Holstein-Pinneberg and Schaumburg.

== Marriage and issue ==
Adolph V was married to Euphemia (d. after 1316), a daughter of Duke Bogislaw IV of Pomerania-Wolgast. They had one daughter:

- Elisabeth (d. 1318), married in 1307 to Burchard I, Count of Lindow-Ruppin.

Adolph V of Holstein-Segeberg House of Schauenburg Born: c. 1252 Died: 1308
Preceded by John I	Counts of Holstein-Kiel; 1263-1273 with his brother John II (1263–1316)	Succeeded by John II
Preceded by himself as Count of Holstein-Kiel	Count of Holstein-Segeberg; 1273-1308	Succeeded by Adolph VII
