= Nicholas II of Werle =

Nicholas II, Lord of Werle
- Born: before 1275
- Died: 18 February 1316; Pustow, near Güstrow
- Noble family: House of Mecklenburg
- Spouses: Richeza of Denmark; Matilda of Brunswick-Lüneburg
- Issue Detail: John III of Werle
- Father: John I of Werle
- Mother: Sophia of Lindow-Ruppin

Nicholas II, Lord of Werle (before 1275 – 18 February 1316 in Pustow, near Güstrow) was Lord of Werle-Parchim from 1283 until his death, and from 1292 Lord of Werle.

His uncle Henry I of Werle was killed in 1291 by his sons Henry II and Nicholas because he had remarried and they felt this threatened their inheritance. After a prolonged war, Nicholas II defeated his cousins, who had formed an alliance with Lord Henry II of Mecklenburg and Elector Albert III of Brandenburg. This allowed him to reunite Werle-Parchim and Werle-Güstrow.

In 1311, he travelled to Montpellier in southern France, where he hoped to be cured of leprosy at the famous school of medicine. He was not cured, but the progress of the disease was slowed. He retired from government and lived the rest of his life at Pustow, near Güstrow.

Nicholas II died in 1316. After his death, Werle was split again, with Nicholas' son John III taking Werle-Goldberg and Nicholas' younger brother John II taking Werle-Güstrow.

== Marriage and issue ==
Nicholas first married in 1292, with Richeza (died before 27 October 1308), a daughter of King Eric V of Denmark. He had two children with her:

- John III, Lord of Werle-Goldberg
- Sophia (d. 6 December 1339), married Gerhard III "the Great", Count of Holstein-Rendsburg

His second wife was Matilda, the daughter of Duke Otto II of Brunswick-Lüneburg. This marriage remained childless.

Nicholas II of Werle House of Mecklenburg Born: before 1275 Died: 18 February 1316
Preceded by John I	Lord of Werle-Parchim; 1283-1316	Succeeded by John III as Lord of Werle-Goldberg
Preceded by Henry II and Nicholas	Lord of Werle-Güstrow; 1292-1316	Succeeded by John II
