= Robin of Isenburg-Covern =

Robin of Isenburg-Covern was the Count of Isenburg-Covern from 1277 until 1306. Robin was the last count of Isenburg-Covern, and after his death it was inherited by Isenburg-Cleberg.

Preceded by Frederick I	Count of Isenburg-Covern; 1272–1306 with Frederick II (1272–1277)	Succeeded by Lothar of Isenburg-Cleberg
