= John II of Holstein-Kiel =

John II, Count of Holstein-Kiel
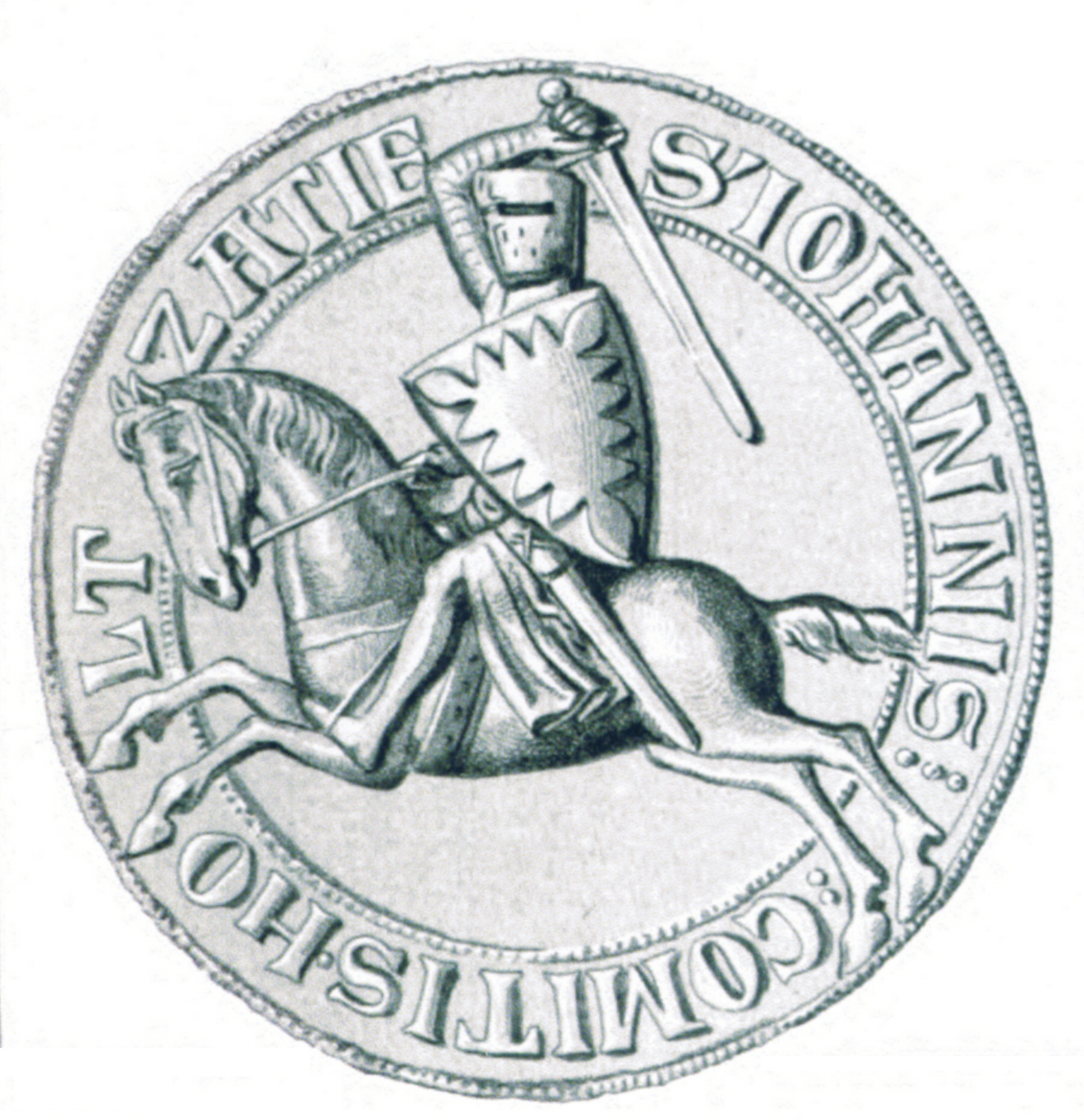
- Seal of John II, dating from the period 1271 to 1302
- Born: 1253
- Died: 1321 (aged 67–68) probably Kiel
- Noble family: House of Schauenburg
- Father: John I, Count of Holstein-Kiel
- Mother: Elisabeth of Saxony

John II, nicknamed the one-eyed (1253–1321) was the ruling count of Holstein-Kiel from 1263 to 1316.

== Life ==
He was younger of the two sons of Count John I, from the Kiel line of the House of Schauenburg.

He divided the county with his uncle, Count Gerhard I of Holstein-Itzehoe and his elder brother, Count Adolphus V of Holstein-Segeberg, meant to be the secundogeniture for Holstein-Kiel. John II received the area between the Kiel Fjord and the sources of the Alster and the Pinnau. He took up residence at Kiel Castle. He was a hapless ruler.

In 1308 his second-born son Adolphus VII succeeded John II's brother Adolphus V in Holstein-Segeberg. After the violent death of his two sons, Adolphus VII and Christopher in 1313 and 1315 respectively, his grand-nephews John III of Holstein-Plön and Gerhard III of Holstein-Rendsburg appropriated most of his territory. He lived until his death from the revenues of the city of Kiel and its surroundings.

His nickname refers to an accident where he lost the sight in one eye after an unfortunate throw of a chicken bone by his court jester.

== Seal ==
The seal depicted at the top of this article reads:
S(IGILLUM)*IOHANNIS*COMITIS*HOLTZATIE
"Seal of John, Count of Holstein"

== Marriage and issue ==
He married Margaret, the daughter of King Christopher I of Denmark and had two sons with her:

- Christopher died in 1313, due to a fall from a window of the count's castle under unexplained circumstances
- Adolphus VII, succeeded his uncle Adolphus V in 1308 as count of Holstein-Segeberg, meant to be Kiel's secundogeniture, he was slain in his bed in 1315 by a group of knights led by Hartwig Reventlow personally at feud with him

John II of Holstein-Kiel House of Schauenburg Born: 1253 Died: 1321
Preceded by John I as Count of Holstein-Kiel	Count of Holstein-Kiel; 1263-1316 with his brother Adolphus V (1263-1273)	Succeeded by Adolphus V as Count of Holstein-Segeberg (newly partitioned)
Preceded by Adolphus VII as Count of Holstein-Segeberg (reverted)	Count of Holstein-Kiel; 1263-1316 with his brother Adolphus V (1263-1273)	Succeeded by John III as Count of Holstein-Kiel
