= Nicholas I of Werle =

Nicholas I, Lord of Werle
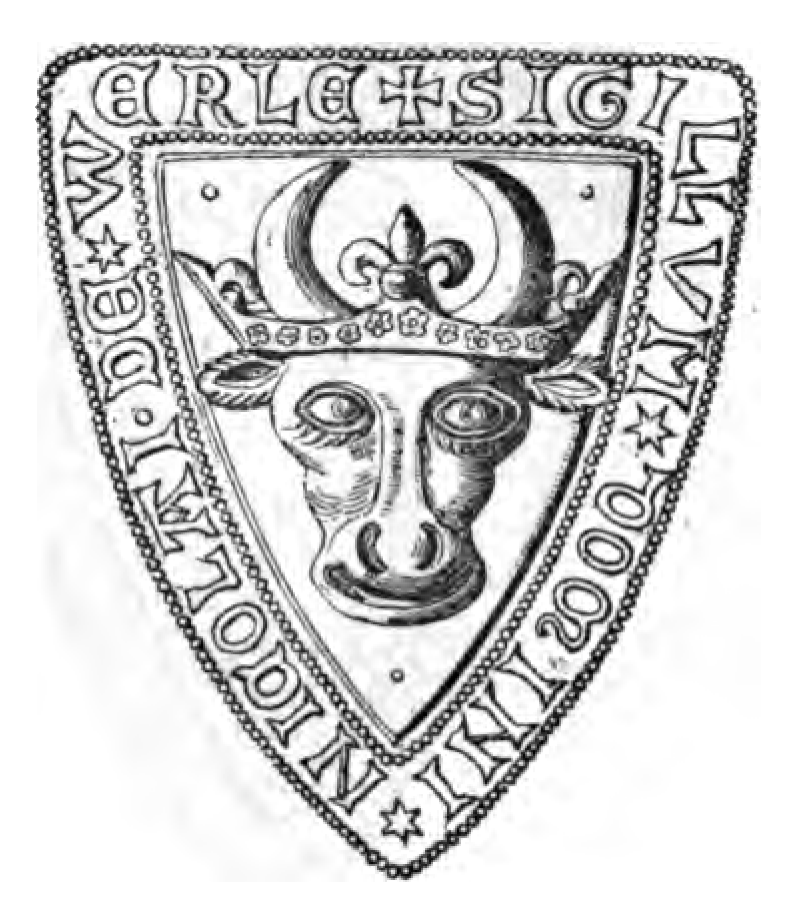
- Born: c. 1210
- Died: 24 May 1277
- Noble family: House of Mecklenburg
- Spouse: Jutta of Anhalt
- Issue: Bernard I of Werle; Hedwig, Margravine of Brandenburg; Henry I of Werle; John I of Werle; Margareta, Duchess of Pomerania
- Father: Henry Borwin II, Lord of Mecklenburg
- Mother: Christina of Sweden

Nicholas I, Lord of Werle (c. 1210 – 14 May 1277), was Lord of Rostock from 1229 to 1234 and Lord of Werle from 1234 until his death.

In the division of Mecklenburg of 1234, he received the Lordship of Werle. He was regent of Rostock for his younger brother Henry Borwin III, until his brother came of age.

He waged war together with Duke Barnim I of Pomerania against the Margraviate of Brandenburg and lost Perleberg, Wesenberg and Penzlin. However, after the death of his brother Pribislaw I, he managed to secure Parchim, Plau and Goldberg for himself. In 1275, he arbitrated in a conflict between his sons.

He strongly supported the founding of cities in its territory. He saw this as a way to develop the land.

He died in 1277. After his death, his sons divided Werle between themselves.

== Marriage and issue ==
He married around 1231 with Jutta, the daughter of Count Henry I of Anhalt. They had the following children:

- Daughter, name unknown, married around 1284 to Conrad I of Gützkow, reeve of Salzwedel
- Daughter, name unknown, married Lord Albert I of Mecklenburg
- Bernard I, Lord of Werle
- Hedwig (d. 1287), married Margrave John II of Brandenburg
- Henry I, Lord of Werle-Güstrow
- John I, Lord of Werle-Parchim
- Margareta (b. aft. 1231 - d. bef. 27 May 1261), second wife of Barnim I, Duke of Pomerania

== Sources ==
- Wigger, Friedrich (1885). "Stammtafeln des Großherzoglichen Hauses von Meklenburg". Jahrbücher des Vereins für Mecklenburgische Geschichte und Altertumskunde. 50: 111–326.

Nicholas I of Werle House of Mecklenburg Born: c. 1210 Died: 14 May 1277
Preceded by Henry Borwin II as Lord of Mecklenburg	Lord of Rostock; 1227-1234	Succeeded by Henry Borwin III
New division	Lord of Werle; 1234-1277	Succeeded by Henry I as Lord of Werle-Güstrow
New division	Lord of Werle; 1234-1277	Succeeded by John I as Lord of Werle-Parchim
