= Oberburg, Kobern =

Oberburg Kobern
- Oberburg, Altenburg
- Kobern-Gondorf
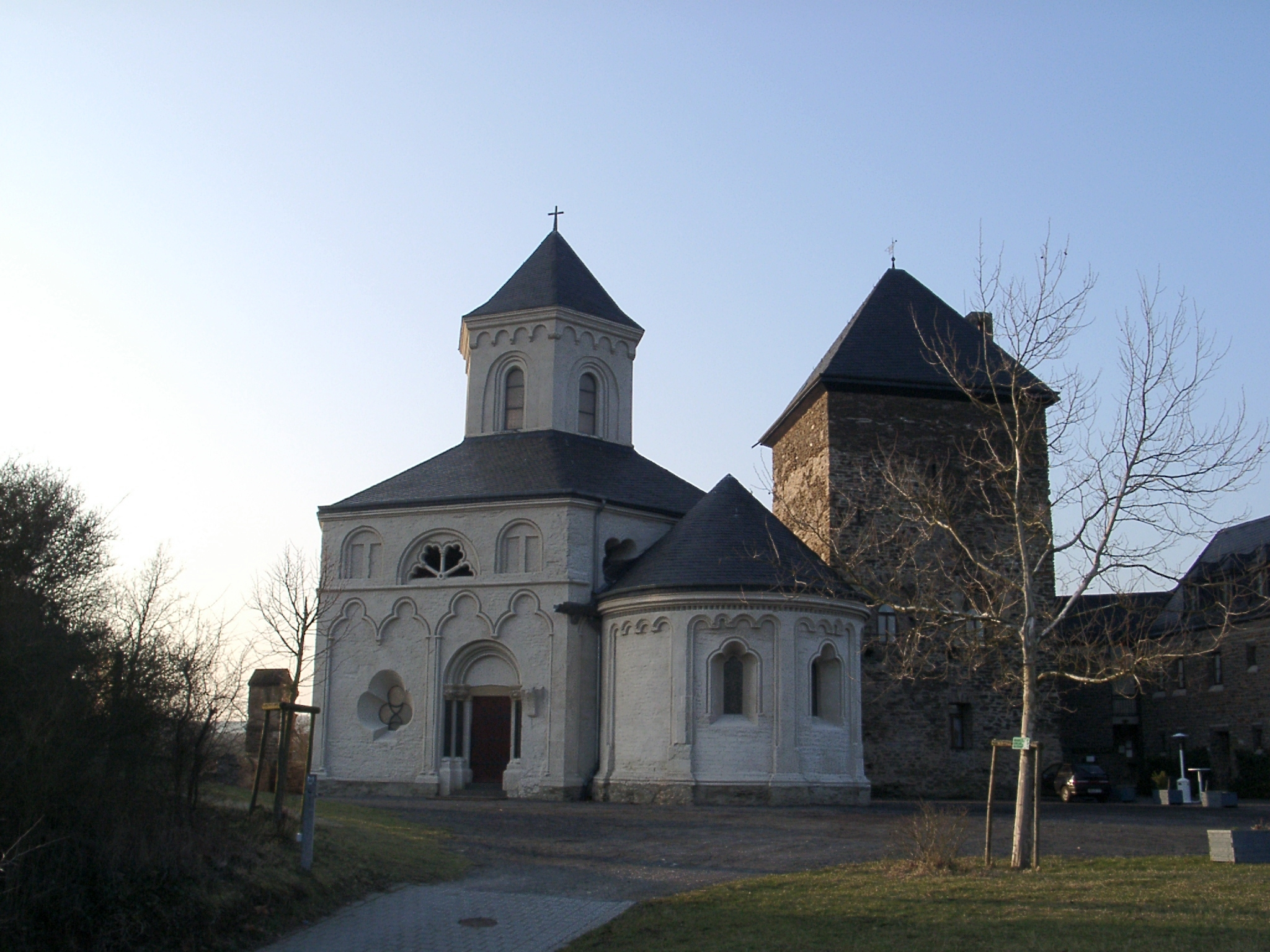
- St. Matthias' Chapel and castle tower

Site information
- Type: hill castle
- Code: DE-RP
- Condition: chapel, bergfried

Location
- Coordinates: 50°18′51.63″N 7°27′13.45″E
- Height: 200 m above sea level (NHN)

Site history
- Built: 1100 to 1200

Garrison information
- Occupants: nobility, clerics

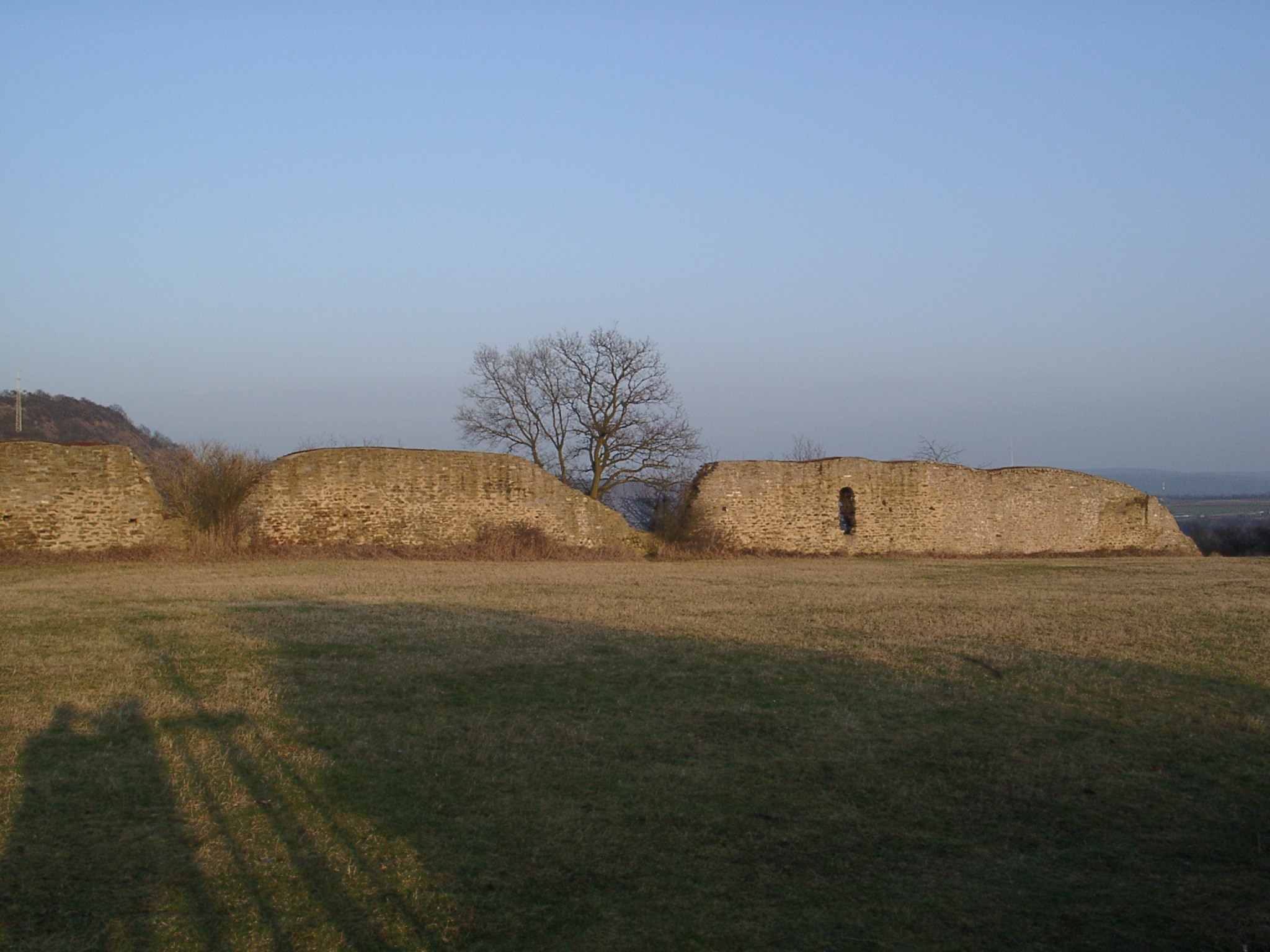
Wall remains of the Oberburg

The Oberburg at Kobern, also called the Oberburg or Altenburg, is a hill castle above the municipality of Kobern-Gondorf in the county of Mayen-Koblenz in the German state of Rhineland-Palatinate.

== Location ==
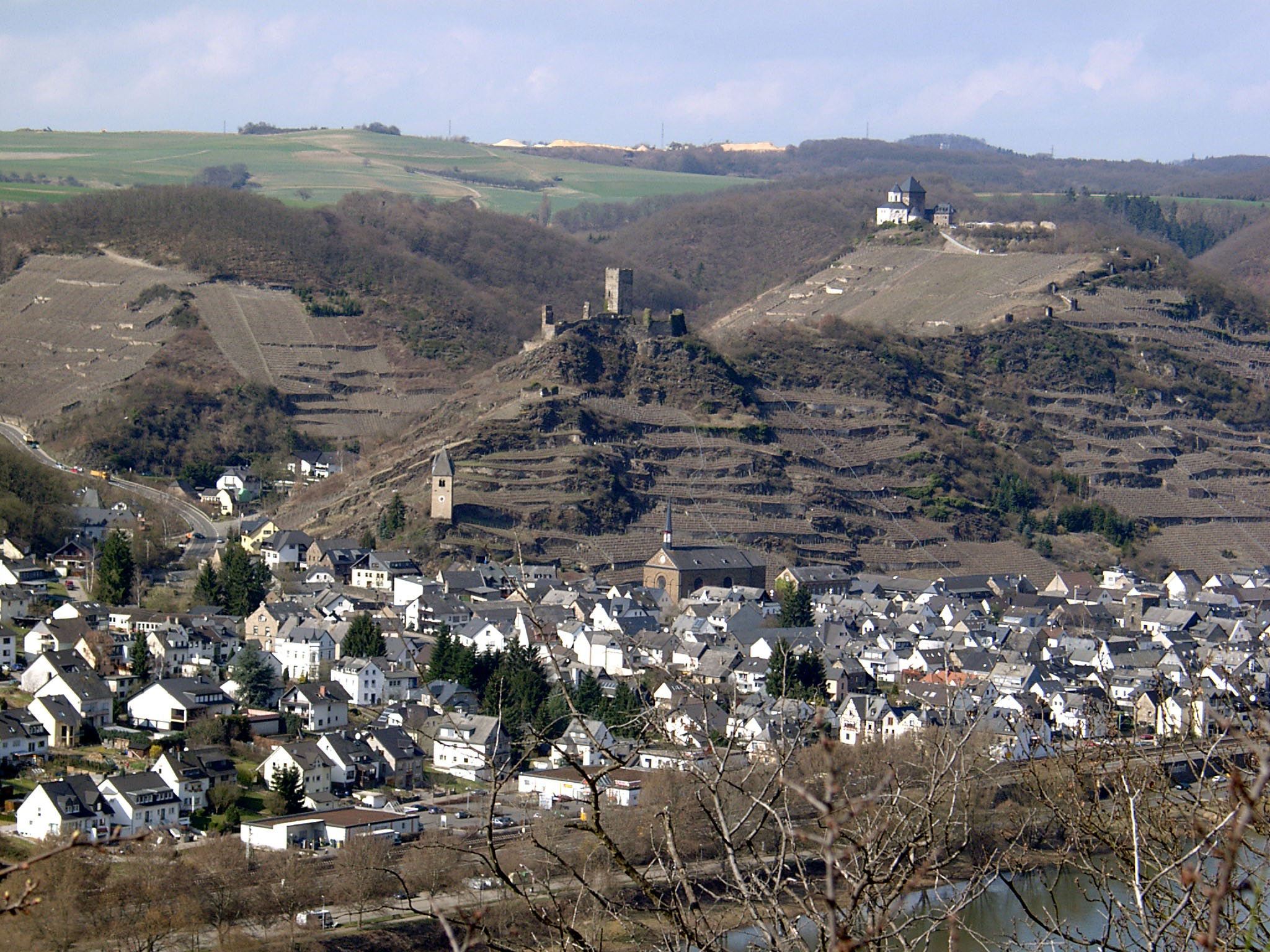
The Niederburg (left) and Oberburg (right)

The ruins of the Oberburg ("Upper Castle") stand at a height of about 200 metres above the village of Kobern on a hill ridge that points towards the Moselle. On the same ridge and about 50 metres lower, is the Niederburg ("Lower Castle").

=== Description ===
Apart from the Late Romanesque St. Matthias' Chapel and the bergfried little other than a few remains of the enceinte have survived. The castle has a rectangular ground plan and measures about 110 by 40 metres. The ground and upper storey of the roughly 9 by 9 metre, square bergfried are vaulted. Access to the second floor is via a staircase in the wall.

The building attached to the bergfried was built in 1989.

== History ==
The castle was built in the early 12th century on a Celtic hillfort site. It is first recorded in 1195, when the then Burgherr made it a fiefdom of the Electorate of Trier.

St. Matthias' Chapel was built about 1220/40 by Lord Henry II of Isenburg, in order to serve as a reliquary for the head of Saint Matthias. The castle area was increased in size when the chapel was built. It used the choir of a previous structure, which was probably not finished.

The lords of Isenburg-Kobern held the castle until the mid-14th century. It was then sold to the Archbishop of Trier and fell into ruin.

In 1936, the bergfried was covered by a temporary roof to protect it from further decay. From 1989, a restaurant was built next to the bergfried on a site that had been built on before. As part of the work, the bergfried was increased in height and given a new roof.

== Visiting ==
The castle is open to the public all year round and may be visited free of charge. There is a restaurant in the bergfried and adjacent buildings. St. Matthias' Chapel can be visited at summer weekends. There is an ascent to the castle up a narrow footpath, the Kreuzweg, through the vineyards, from the Mühlbach valley. There is also a car par immediately below the castle.

== Protected monument ==
The Oberburg is a protected cultural monument.

== Literature ==
- Alexander Thon, Stefan Ulrich: „Von den Schauern der Vorwelt umweht ...“ Burgen und Schlösser an der Mosel. 1st edition, Verlag Schnell & Steiner, Regensburg, 2007, ISBN 978-3-7954-1926-4, pp. 86–91.
- Landesamt für Denkmalpflege - Burgen, Schlösser, Altertümer Rheinland-Pfalz (publ.), Führer der staatlichen Schlösserverwaltung des Landesamtes für Denkmalpflege Rheinland-Pfalz, Führungsheft 7, Mainz, 1999.
- Ortsgemeinde Kobern-Gondorf (Hrsg.): Kobern-Gondorf. 1980.
- Das Mittelrheinische Becken. Edition no. 1 Böhlau, Cologne; Weimar; Vienna 2003, ISBN 3-412-10102-8 (Werte der deutschen Heimat. Vol. 65).
