= John I of Werle =

John I, Lord of Werle
- Born: c. 1245
- Died: 15 October 1283
- Noble family: House of Mecklenburg
- Spouse: Sophia of Lindow-Ruppin
- Issue Detail: Nicholas II of Werle; John II of Werle
- Father: Nicholas I of Werle
- Mother: Jutta of Anhalt

John I, Lord of Werle-Parchim (c. 1245 – 15 October 1283), was from 1277 to 1281 to Lord of Werle and from 1281 to 1283 and to Lord of Werle-Parchim.

He was the eldest son of Nicholas I and Jutta of Anhalt.

After his father's death in 1277, he first ruled Werle together with his brothers Henry I and Bernard I. In 1281, it was decided to divide Werle and John took over control of Werle-Parchim.

He was married with Sophia, the daughter of Count Günther of Lindow-Ruppin.

He died on 15 October 1283, and was buried in the Doberan Minster.

== Children ==
John's daughters are not mentioned in historic documents, only his sons

- Nicholas II, Lord of Werle, 1283-1316
- John II, Lord of Werle [-Güstrow], 1316-1337
- Gunter, Dean of Güstrow, and perhaps Magdeburg, died after 20 April 1310
- Henry, Dominican friar at Röbel Monastery, died after 17 March 1291
- Bernard, Dominican friar at Röbel Monastery, died after 24 August 1309
- Henning of Werle, died after 30 November 1311

== Sources ==
- Wigger, Friedrich (1885). "Stammtafeln des Großherzoglichen Hauses von Meklenburg". Jahrbücher des Vereins für Mecklenburgische Geschichte und Altertumskunde. 50: 111–326.

John I of Werle House of Mecklenburg Born: c. 1245 Died: 15 October 1283
Preceded by Nicholas I	Lord of Werle; 1277-1283	Succeeded by Nicholas II
