= Henry I of Werle =

- Died: 5 October 1291
- Noble family: House of Mecklenburg
- Spouses: Rikissa Birgersdotter; Matilde of Brunswick-Lüneburg
- Father: Nicholas I of Werle
- Mother: Jutta of Anhalt

Henry I (died 8 October 1291) was a Prince of Mecklenburg-Werle and Mecklenburg-Güstrow.

== Biography ==
He was the son of Prince Nicholas I of Mecklenburg-Werle and his wife Princess Jutta of Anhalt the daughter of Prince Henry I of Anhalt and his wife Princess Irmgard of Thuringia. Henry and his brother John ruled Mecklenburg-Werle jointly following the death of their father on 10 May 1277.

Henry and his brother ruled jointly until 1283 when Henry founded the principality of Mecklenburg-Güstrow while John took up residence in the principality of Mecklenburg-Parchim which he ruled jointly with Prince Pribislaw II. Henry's reign in Güstrow came to an end on 8 October 1291 after he was murdered near Saal by his two sons Henry and Nicholas both of whom succeeded him.

== Marriages and children ==
Henry was married twice; firstly in 1262 to Rikissa Birgersdotter (died 1288), with the following children:

- Henry II of Werle (died 1308) married Beatrix of Pomerania (died 1315–16), daughter of Barnim I, Duke of Pomerania
- Nicholas of Werle-Güstrow (died 1298)
- Rixa of Werle (died 1317) married Albert II, Duke of Brunswick-Göttingen

He was married secondly in 1291 to Matilde of Brunswick-Lüneburg (died 1302), the daughter of John, Duke of Brunswick-Lüneburg.

Henry I of Werle House of Mecklenburg Born: c. 1245 Died: 8 October 1291
Regnal titles
Preceded by Nicholas I	Prince of Mecklenburg-Werle; 1277–1283	Became Prince of Mecklenburg-Güstrow
New title	Prince of Mecklenburg-Güstrow; 1283–1291	Succeeded by Henry II and Nicholas
