= Family tree of Danish monarchs =

This is a family tree of Danish monarchs from the semi-legendary king Harthacnut I in the 10th century to the present monarch, King Frederik X. The official dynasty is the House of Glücksburg, but the current King Frederik X, a matrilineal member of the Glücksburgs, is a member and Head of the De Laborde de Monpezat family, through his father, Prince Henrik of Denmark, because Henrik was born as Henri de Laborde de Monpezat. Frederik is married to Queen Mary and their son, Christian, Crown Prince of Denmark, is their heir.

== House of Gorm ==
House of Gorm

Harthacnut I semi-legendary King of Denmark
Gorm the Old ?-c. 963/964; King of Denmark r. 935(?)–963/964	Thyra d. 958
Gunhild	Tove of the Obotrites; 10th century	Harald Bluetooth; 932–985; King of Denmark r. 963/964–985	Gyrid of Sweden; 10th cent.	Knut Gormsson c. 920/925–962; Co-King of Denmark r. 947–962	Toke c. 948/950–986; King of Scania; King of Denmark r. 971–986, r. 985–986
Styrbjörn the Strong d. 986	Tyra of Denmark d. 1000	Olaf Tryggvason; 960s–1000 King of Norway	Sigrid the Haughty; 960/972–1014	Sweyn Forkbeard; 963–1014; King of Denmark r. 986–1014	Gunhild of Wenden	Haakon b. 961	Gunhilde d. 1002	Pallig Tokesen d. 1002	Richard I 933–996; Duke of Normandy	Gunnor c. 936–1031
Eric Haakonsson; 960s–1020s Ruler of Norway	Gytha	Santslaue	Ælfgifu of Northampton c. 990–after 1040	Cnut the Great c. 985/995–1035; King of Denmark r. 1018–1035	Emma of Normandy c. 985–1052	Thyra	Harald II ?–1018; King of Denmark r. 1014–1018	Estrid; Svendsdatter; 990/997–1057/1073	Ulf the Earl; Jarl of Skåne d. 1026	Richard II; 963–1026; Duke of Normandy
Svein Knutsson c. 1016–1035; King of Norway	Harold I Harefoot c. 1015–1040; King of England	Harthacnut; Canute III c. 1018–1042; King of Denmark r. 1035–1042	Gunhilda of Denmark c. 1020–1038	Henry III; 1017–1056; Holy Roman Emperor	Sweyn II Estridsson c. 1019–1076; King of Denmark r. 1047–1076	Beorn Estrithson d. 1049
House of Estridsen

== House of Estridsen ==
Note: This chart also includes the kings from the Houses of Bjälbo (Olaf II); Pomerania (Eric VII) and Palatinate-Neumarkt (Christopher III) + the son of Hakon Sunnivasson (Eric III)

House of Estridsen

Sweyn; Forkbeard; King of Denmark; 963-1014 r.986–1014	Thorgil; Sprakling
Anund Jacob; King of Sweden; 1008/1010- ~1050 r.1022-~1050	Gunnhildr; Sveinsdóttir d. c.1060	Cnut the Great; King of Denmark c.985/995–1035 r.1018–1035	Harald II; King of Denmark ?-1018 r.1014–1018	Estrid; Svendsdatter; 990/997– 1057/1073	Ulf the Earl; Jarl of Orkney d.1026
Gyda of Sweden d. c.1048/1049	Sweyn II; Estridsson; King of Denmark c.1019-1076 r.1047–1076	Tora; Torbergsdatter	Beorn; Estrithson d.1049	Harald III; Hardrada; King of Norway c.1015-1066 r.1046–1066
Gottschalk	Sigrid; Svendsdatter d._{after}1066	Sweyn the Crusader c.1050–1097	Olaf I Hunger; King of Denmark c.1050–1095 r.1086–1095	Ingegerd of Norway; 1046–1120	Ingerid of Denmark	Olaf III; King of Norway c.1050–1093 r.1067-1093
Harald III; Hen; King of Denmark c.1040–1080 r.1076-1080	Margareta; Hasbjörnsdatter	Canute IV the Holy; King of Denmark c.1042–1086 r.1080-1086	Adela of Flanders c.1064–1115	Eric I Evergood; King of Denmark c.1060–1103 r.1095–1103	Boedil; Thurgotsdatter d.1103	Svend; Svendsen d.1104	Ulvhild; Håkansdotter c.1095–1148	Niels; King of Denmark c.1065-1134 r.1104–1134	Margaret; Fredkulla of Sweden; 1080s–1130
Folke the Fat	Ingegerd; Knudsdatter of Denmark; 1080/1085-?	Charles I Ct of Flanders; 1084-1127 r.1119–1127	Ingeborg of Kiev	Canute; Lavard; Duke of Schleswig c.1090/90-1131 r.1120–1131	Harald; Kesja; 1080–1135 r.1103–1104 r.1134–1135	Ragnhild of Denmark	Eric II the Memorable; King of Denmark c.1090–1137 r.1134-1137	Malmfred of Kiev	Magnus I King of Sweden; 1106-1134 r.1125–1130 r.1134
House of Bjelbo	Magnus IV; King of Norway; 1115-1139 r.1130–1135 /1037-1139	Christina; Knutsdatter of Denmark c.1118–1139	Valdemar I the Great; King of Denmark; 1131-1182 r.1154–1182	Sophia of Minsk c.1140–1198	Eric III; Lamb; King of Denmark c. 1120–1146 r.1137–1146	Lutgard of Salzwedel b. c. 1110-1152	Sweyn III; Grathe; King of Denmark c.1125–1157 r.1146-1157	Canute V Magnussen; King of Denmark c.1129–1157 r.1146-1157
Gertrude of Bavaria; 1152/1155 –1197	Canute VI; King of Denmark; 1163-1202 r.1182–1202	Ingeborg of Denmark; 1175–1236	Philip II; Augustus; King of France; 1165-1223 r.1179–1223	Helena of Denmark c.1180–1233	William of Winchester; Lord of Lüneburg; 1184–1213	Richeza of Denmark c.1180–1220	Eric X Knutsson; King of Sweden c. 1180–1216 r.1208–1216
Helena; Guttormsdotter	Dagmar of Bohemia c.1186–1212	Valdemar II the Victorious; King of Denmark; 1170-1241 r.1202–1241	Berengaria of Portugal; 1190s–1221	unknown mistress
Canute; Valdemarsen; Duke of Estonia c.1205–1260	Valdemar the Young; King of Denmark c. 1209-1231 r.1215–1231	Eleanor of Portugal c.1211–1231	Niels; Count of Halland ?-1218 r.1216-1218	Oda of Schwerin
Matilda of Holstein; 1220/1225– 1288	Abel; King of Denmark; 1218-1252 r.1250–1252	Christopher I King of Denmark; 1219-1259 r.1252–1259	Margaret; Sambiria; 1230?–1282	Eric IV; Ploughpenny; King of Denmark c.1216-1250 r.1232–1250	Jutta of Saxony c.1223–1267	Sophie; 1217–1247	John I Margrave of Brandenburg c.1213-1266 r.1220-1266
Bernhard I Prince of Anhalt-Bernburg; 1218-1287 r.1252–1287	Sophie; 1240-_{aft.}1284	Valdemar III; Duke of Schleswig; 1238-1257 r.1253-1257	Eric I Duke of Schleswig; 1241-1272 r.1260-1272	Abel; Lord of Langeland; 1252–1279	Valdemar; King of Sweden; 1239-1302 r.1250–1275	Sophia of Denmark; 1241–1286	Ingeborg; Eriksdotter of Denmark c.1244–1287	Magnus VI; Haakonsson; King of Norway; 1238-1280 r.1263-1280	Agnes of Denmark; 1249-_{after}1290
Bernhard II; Prince of Anhalt-Bernburg c.1260–_{aft.}1323 r.1287–1323	Valdemar IV; Duke of Schleswig ?-1312 r.1283-1312	Agnes of Brandenburg c.1257–1304	Eric V Klipping; King of Denmark; 1249-1286 r.1259–1286	Matilda; 1250– 1299/1300	Albert III; Margrave of Brandenburg- Salzwedel c.1250 –1300	Margaret c.1257–1306	John II; Count of Holstein-Kiel; 1253-1321 r.1263-1316	Magnus III; King of Sweden; 1240-1290 r.1275-1290
Bernhard III; Prince of Anhalt-Bernburg ?-1348 r.1323–1348	Nicholas II; Lord of Werle; 1275-1316 r.1283-1316	Richeza of Denmark d.1303/1308	Henry I Ct of Holstein -Rendsburg; 1258-1304 r.1290-1304	Euphemia of Pomerania; 1285–1330	Christopher II; King of Denmark; 1276-1332 r.1320-1326 /1329-1332	Eric VI; Menved; King of Denmark; 1274-1319 r.1286–1319	Ingeborg; Magnusdotter of Sweden; 1277–1319	Margaret; Eriksdatter of Denmark; 1277–1341	Birger; Magnusson; King of Sweden; 1280-1321 r.1290-1318
Eric II; Duke of Schleswig c.1290–1325 r.1312-1325	Sophia of Werle d.1339	Gerhard III; Count of Holstein- Rendsburg; 1292-1340 r.1304–1340	Elizabeth of Holstein -Rendsburg c.1300-_{before}1340	Eric; Christoffersen; Junior King of Denmark c.1307-1332 r.1321–1326 /1329–1332	Valdemar IV; Atterdag; King of Denmark c.1320-1375 r.1340-1375	Helvig of Schleswig d.1374	Otto; Duke of Lolland and Estonia c.1310– _{after}1346	Margaret of Denmark; 1305–1340
Catherine of Anhalt- Bernburg c.1330–1390	Valdemar III; King of Denmark; 1314-1364 r.1326<-1329	Albert II; Duke of Mecklenburg c.1318–1379 r.1329-1379	Christopher; Duke of Lolland c.1341/1344 –1363	Margaret I Queen of Denmark; 1353-1412 r.1387–1412	Haakon VI; King of Norway; 1340-1380 r.1343–1380
Henry II; Ct of Holstein -Rendsburg c. 1317-1381/84 r.1340-1381/84	Ingeborg of Mecklenburg -Schwerin; 1343/1345–1395	Henry III; Duke of Mecklenburg c.1337-1383 r.1379–1383	Ingeborg of Denmark; 1347–1370	Olaf II; King of Denmark; 1370-1387 r.1376–1387
Catherine; Elisabeth of Brunswick -Lüneburg; 1385–_{after}1423	Gerhard VI; Ct of Holstein -Rendsburg c.1367–1404 r.1382-1404	Maria of Mecklenburg -Schwerin	Wartislaw VII; Duke of Pomerania r.1377-1395
Dietrich; Count of Oldenburg c.1398–1440 r.1403–1440	Helvig of Schauenburg; 1398–1436	John; Count Palatine of Neumarkt; 1383-1443 r.1410-1443	Catherine of Pomerania c.1390-1426	Philippa of England; 1394–1430	Eric VII of Pomerania; King of Denmark; 1381/82-1459 r.1396–1439	Cecilia fl.1439
Christian I King of Denmark; 1426-1481 r.1448–1481	Dorothea of Brandenburg; 1430/1431–1495	Christopher III of Bavaria; King of Denmark; 1416-1448 r.1440–1448

== House of Oldenburg ==
House of Oldenburg

Eric V Klipping; 1249–1286; King of Denmark r. 1259–1286	Abel; 1218–1252; King of Denmark r. 1250–1252
3 generations skipped	4 generations skipped
Gerhard VI c. 1367–1404; Count of Holstein-Rendsburg	Catherine Elisabeth of Brunswick-Lüneburg; 1385–after 1423
Dietrich; 1398–1440; Count of Oldenburg	Hedvig of Holstein; 1398–1436
Christian I 1426–1481; King of Denmark r. 1448–1481	Dorothea of Brandenburg; 1430/1431–1495
Christina of Saxony; 1461–1521	John; 1455–1513; King of Denmark r. 1481–1513	Margaret of Denmark; 1456–1486	James III; 1451–1488; King of Scots	Anna of Brandenburg; 1487–1514	Frederick I 1471–1533; King of Denmark r. 1523–1533	Sophie of Pomerania; 1498–1568
Elizabeth of Denmark; 1485–1555	Joachim I Nestor; 1484–1535; Elector of Brandenburg	Francis of Denmark; 1497–1511	John II; 1521–1580; Duke of Schleswig-Holstein	Adolf; 1526–1586; Duke of Holstein-Gottorp	Christine of Hesse; 1543–1604	Dorothea of Denmark; 1528–1575	Christopher; 1537–1592; Duke of Mecklenburg
Isabella of Austria; 1501–1526	Christian II; 1481–1559; King of Denmark r. 1513–1523	Dorothea of Saxe-Lauenburg; 1511–1571	Christian III; 1503–1559; King of Denmark r. 1534–1559	Dorothea of Denmark; 1504–1547	Albert; 1490–1568; Duke of Prussia	Ulrich III; 1527–1603; Duke of Mecklenburg	Elizabeth of Denmark; 1524–1586	Magnus III of Mecklenburg-Schwerin; 1509–1550	Frederick; 1532–1556; Prince-Bishop of Hildesheim
Elisabeth of Brunswick-Grubenhagen; 1550–1586	John II; Duke of Schleswig-Holstein-Sonderburg; 1545–1622	Magnus; 1540–1583; Duke of Holstein	Maria Vladimirovna of Staritsa c1560–1610	Frederick II; 1534–1588; King of Denmark r. 1559–1588	Sophie of Mecklenburg-Güstrow; 1557–1631	Dorothea of Denmark; 1546–1617	William the Younger; Duke of Duke of Brunswick-Lüneburg; 1535–1592	Anne of Denmark; 1532–1585	Augustus; 1526–1586; Elector of Saxony
Henry Julius; Duke of Brunswick-Lüneburg; 1564–1613	Elizabeth of Denmark; 1573–1626	Anne of Denmark; 1574–1619	James VI/I; 1566–1625; King of England	Augusta of Denmark; 1580–1639	John Adolf; 1575–1616; Duke of Holstein-Gottorp	Hedwig of Denmark; 1581–1641	Christian II; 1583–1611; Elector of Saxony
Alexander; 1573–1627; Duke of Schleswig-Holstein-Sonderburg	Ulrik of Denmark; 1578–1624	John of Schleswig-Holstein; 1583–1602
August Philipp; 1612–1675; Duke of Schleswig-Holstein-Sonderburg-Beck	Kirsten Madsdatter d.1613	Anne Catherine of Brandenburg; 1575–1612	Christian IV; 1577–1648; King of Denmark r. 1588–1648	Kirsten Munk; 1598–1658	Vibeke Kruse d. 1648	Karen Andersdatter d.1673
Christian Ulrik Gyldenløve; 1611–1640	Ulrik Christian Gyldenløve; 1630–1658	Hans Ulrik Gyldenløve; 1615–1645
Ulrik of Denmark; 1611–1633	Magdalene Sibylle of Saxony; 1617–1668	Christian; 1603–1647; Prince-Elect of Denmark	Valdemar Christian of Schleswig-Holstein; 1622–1656	Christiane Sehested; 1626–1670	Hannibal Sehested; 1609–1666	Hedevig Ulfeldt; 1626–1678	Ebbe Ulfeldt c. 1600–1670
Sophie Amalie of Brunswick-Lüneburg; 1628–1685	Frederick III; 1609–1670; King of Denmark r. 1648–1670	Sophie Elisabeth; 1619–1657	Christian von Pentz; 1600–1651	Elisabeth Augusta Lindenov; 1623–1677	Hans; Lindenov d.1659	Leonora Christina; 1621–1698	Corfitz Ulfeldt; 1606–1664
John George III; 1647–1691; Elector of Saxony	Anna Sophie of Denmark; 1647–1717	Frederica Amalia of Denmark; 1649–1704	Christian Albert; 1641–1695; Duke of Holstein-Gottorp	Wilhelmine Ernestine of Denmark; 1650–1706	Charles II; 1651–1685; Elector Palatine	George; 1653–1708; Duke of Cumberland	Anne; 1665–1714; Queen of Great Britain
Frederick Louis; 1653–1728; Duke of Schleswig-Holstein-Sonderburg-Beck	Charlotte Amalie of Hesse-Kassel; 1650–1714	Christian V 1646–1699; King of Denmark r. 1670–1699	Sophie Amalie Moth; 1654–1719; Countess of Samsøe	Ulrika Eleonora of Denmark; 1656–1693	Charles XI; 1655–1697; King of Sweden
Charlotte Amalie; 1682–1699	Christian Gyldenløve; 1674–1703	Dorothea Krag; 1675–1754	Ulrik Christian; 1678 –1719; Count of Samsø
Christian of Denmark; 1675–1695	Sophia Hedwig of Denmark; 1677–1735	Charles of Denmark; 1680–1729	William of Denmark; 1687–1705	Louise of Mecklenburg-Güstrow; 1667–1721	Frederick IV; 1671–1730; King of Denmark r. 1699–1730	Elisabeth Helene von Vieregg; 1679–1704	Anne Sophie Reventlow; 1693–1743
Peter August; 1697–1775; Duke of Schleswig-Holstein-Sonderburg-Beck	Sophie Magdalene of Brandenburg-Kulmbach; 1700–1770	Christian VI; 1699–1746; King of Denmark r. 1730–1746	Charlotte Amalie of Denmark; 1706–1782	George II; King of Great Britain; 163O–1760
Karl Anton of Schleswig-Holstein-Sonderburg-Beck; 1727–1759	Ernest Frederick III; 1727–1780; Duke of Saxe-Hildburghausen	Louise of Denmark; 1726–1756	Juliana Maria of Brunswick-Wolfenbüttel; 1729–1796	Frederick V 1723–1766; King of Denmark r. 1746–1766	Louise of Great Britain; 1724–1751	Frederick; 1707–1751; Prince of Wales
Sophia Frederica of Mecklenburg-Schwerin; 1758–1794	Frederick; 1753–1805; Hereditary Prince of Denmark	Frederick II; 1720–1785; Landgrave of Hesse-Kassel
Friedrich Karl; 1757–1816; Duke of Schleswig-Holstein-Sonderburg-Beck	Charles; 1744–1836; Landgrave of Hesse-Kassel	Louise of Denmark; 1750–1831	William I 1743–1821; Elector of Hesse	Wilhelmina Caroline of Denmark; 1747–1820	Caroline Matilda of Great Britain; 1751–1775	Christian VII; 1749–1808; King of Denmark r. 1766–1808	Sophia Magdalena of Denmark; 1746–1813	Gustav III; 1746–1792; King of Sweden
Friedrich Wilhelm; 1785–1831; Duke of Schleswig-Holstein-Sonderburg-Glücksburg	Louise Caroline of Hesse-Kassel; 1789–1867	Marie of Hesse-Kassel; 1767–1852	Frederick VI; 1768–1839; King of Denmark r. 1808–1839	Louise Auguste of Denmark; 1771–1843	Frederick Christian II; Duke of Schleswig-Holstein-Sonderburg-Augustenburg; 1765–1814
Christian IX; 1818–1906; King of Denmark r. 1863–1906	Louise of Hesse-Kassel; 1817–1898	Ferdinand; 1792–1863; Hereditary Prince of Denmark	Caroline of Denmark; 1793–1881	Charlotte Frederica of Mecklenburg-Schwerin; 1784–1840	Christian VIII; 1786–1848; King of Denmark r. 1839–1848	Caroline Amalie of Augustenburg; 1796–1881
House of Glücksburg	Vilhelmine Marie of Denmark; 1808–1891	Frederick VII; 1808–1863; King of Denmark r. 1848–1863	Caroline Mariane of Mecklenburg; 1821–1876	Louise Rasmussen; 1815–1874; Countess Danner

== House of Glücksburg ==
House of Glücksburg

Frederick V 1723–1766; King of Denmark r. 1746–1766	Christian III; 1503–1559; King of Denmark r. 1534–1559
Princess Louise of Denmark; 1750–1831	7 generations skipped
Louise Caroline of Hesse-Kassel; 1789–1867	Friedrich Wilhelm; 1785–1831; Duke of Schleswig-Holstein-Sonderburg-Glücksburg
Christian IX; 1818–1906; King of Denmark r. 1863–1906	Louise of Hesse-Kassel; 1817–1898	Friedrich of Schleswig-Holstein-Sonderburg-Glücksburg; 1814–1885
Ernest Augustus; 1845–1923; Duke of Cumberland and Teviotdale	Thyra of Denmark; 1853–1933	Maria Feodorovna of Denmark; 1847–1928	Alexander III; 1845–1894; Emperor of Russia
Olga of Russia; 1851–1926	George I 1845–1913; King of Greece	Alexandra of Denmark; 1844–1925	Edward VII; 1841–1910; King of the United Kingdom	Frederik VIII; 1843–1912; King of Denmark r. 1906–1912	Louise of Sweden; 1851–1926	Valdemar of Denmark; 1858–1939	Marie of Orléans; 1865–1909	Friedrich Ferdinand of Schleswig-Holstein; 1855–1934
Frederick of Schaumburg-Lippe; 1868–1945	Louise of Denmark; 1875–1906	Maud of Wales; 1869–1938	Haakon VII; 1872–1957; King of Norway	Thyra of Denmark; 1880–1945	Gustav of Denmark; 1887–1944	Ingeborg of Denmark; 1878–1958	Carl; 1861–1951; Duke of Västergötland
Gustaf VI Adolf; 1882–1973; King of Sweden	Jørgen Castenskjold; 1893–1978	Dagmar of Denmark; 1890–1961	Alexandrine of Mecklenburg-Schwerin; 1879–1952	Christian X 1870–1947; King of Denmark r. 1912–1947	Harald of Denmark; 1876–1949	Helena Adelaide of Schleswig-Holstein-Sonderburg-Glücksburg; 1888–1962
Ingrid of Sweden; 1910–2000	Frederik IX; 1899–1972; King of Denmark r. 1947–1972	Knud; 1900–1976; Hereditary Prince of Denmark	Caroline Mathilde of Denmark; 1912–1995
Henrik of Monpezat; 1934–2018	Margrethe II b. 1940; Queen of Denmark r. 1972–2024	Benedikte of Denmark b. 1944	Richard of Sayn-Wittgenstein-Berleburg; 1934–2017	Anne Marie of Greece b. 1946	Constantine II; 1940–2023; King of Greece	Inge Terney; 1938–1996	Ingolf b. 1940; Count of Rosenborg	Sussie Hjorhøy b. 1950
Mary Donaldson b. 1972	Frederik X b. 1968; King of Denmark r. 2024–present	Alexandra Manley b. 1964	Joachim of Denmark b. 1969	Marie Cavallier b. 1976	Christian; 1942–2013; Count of Rosenborg	Anne Dorte Maltoft-Nielsen; 1947–2014	Elisabeth of Denmark; 1935–2018
Christian b. 2005; Crown Prince of Denmark	Isabella of Denmark b. 2007	Vincent of Denmark b. 2011	Josephine of Denmark b. 2011	Nikolai of Denmark b. 1999	Felix of Denmark b. 2002	Henrik of Denmark b. 2009	Athena of Denmark b. 2012
