= House of Estridsen =

Medieval Danish dynasty

- Parent house: (maternal) Knýtlinga (paternal) Ulf
- Country: Denmark, Norway and Sweden; Kalmar Union
- Founded: 1047; 979 years ago
- Founder: Sweyn II of Denmark
- Final ruler: Margaret I (r. 1387–1412)
- Final head: Knud Mogensen Løvenbalk (last known agnatic member of the family, died after June 1598)
- Titles: King of Denmark, Queen of Norway, Queen of Sweden, King of Sweden, Duke of Schleswig, Count of Flanders, Duke of Gothenland
- Cadet branches: Abelslægten line (extinct 1375; 651 years ago); Løvenbalk line (extinct after June 1598; 428 years ago)

The House of Estridsen was a dynasty that provided the kings of Denmark from 1047 to 1412. The dynasty is named after its ancestor Estrid Svendsdatter. The dynasty is sometimes called the Ulfinger, after Estrid's husband, Ulf Jarl. The dynasty also provided three medieval rulers of Sweden and one of Norway. Their family coat of arms became the coat of arms of Denmark and thereby influenced the coat of arms of Tallinn and the coat of arms of Estonia.

The Royal Court of Denmark does not differentiate between different royal houses among the early Danish kings, but uses the term "the descent of Gorm the Old" about all the pre-Oldenburg monarchs.. The term is "Gorm den Gamles slægt" — literally "Gorm the Old's lineage/family." It's also referred to as Jellingdynastiet, Gormslægten, or occasionally Jelling-slægten (the Jelling dynasty).

== Background ==
The name of the Estridsen dynasty recalls their acquisition of the Danish crown through the marriage of Ulf the Earl to Estrid Svendsdatter of the House of Knýtlinga, daughter of Sweyn Forkbeard and sister of Cnut the Great. Later genealogies (introduced by the Danish historian Jakob Langebek in the 18th century) trace the family from Jomsviking leader Styrbjörn the Strong, a scion of the Swedish royal family, who in turn is given a descent from legendary King Sigurd Hring, regarded as mythical by most modern historians (no actual sources mention such an ancestry). Reliable ancestry traces back no earlier than Ulf's own father, the obscure Thorgil Sprakling and grandfather Björn (in sources called Ursius), the latter thus alternatively being identified as the above Styrbjörn by Langebek.

The dynasty reached its peak with the Kalmar Union, when its members reigned as kings of Denmark, Norway and Sweden in personal union. The dynasty came to end in 1412 with the death of its last member Queen Margaret I. All of the subsequent monarchs of Denmark are cognatic descendants of the House of Estridsen.

== Line of descent ==
Estridsen family tree

=== From Thorgil Sprakling to Eric I the Good ===
1. Thorgil Sprakling
  1. Ulf the Earl, murdered in 1026, probably Jarl in England from 1017, married Estrid Svendsdatter (990/997 — 1057/1073), a daughter of Sweyn Forkbeard (c. 960 – 1014) and a sister of Cnut the Great (c. 985 or 995 – 1035)
    1. Sweyn II of Denmark (c. 1019 – 1076), Jarl from 1042, King of Denmark from 1047
      1. Sweyn the Crusader, murdered in 1097, married Florine (d. 1097), the daughter of Odo I, Duke of Burgundy
      2. Harald III (c. 1040 – 1080)
      3. Sigrid, married Gottschalk (d. 1066), a prince of the Obotrites
      4. Saint Canute IV (c. 1042 – 1086), Jarl of Zealand from 1076, King of Denmark from 1080, married Adela (c. 1064 – 1115), daughter of Robert I, Count of Flanders
        1. Blessed Charles the Good (1083–1127), murdered on 2 March 1127 in Bruges, Count of Flanders from 1119, married c. 1119 to Margaret, daughter of Renaud II, Count of Clermont-en-Beauvaisis
        2. Cecilia (c. 1085/86 – 1131), married to Erik Jarl in Västergötland
        3. Ingerid (c. 1085/86 – ?), married Folke the Fat Jarl in Sweden
      5. Olaf I (c. 1050 – 1095), Jarl of Southern Jutland from 1080, King of Denmark from 1086, married Ingegerd, the daughter of King Harald Hardrada of Norway
      6. Ingerid, married c. 1070 to King Olaf III of Norway
      7. Eric I the Good (c. 1060, Slangerup, Denmark – 10 July 1103, Paphos, Cyprus), Jarl of Zealand from 1080, King of Denmark from 1095 — for his descendants, see below
      8. Svend Tronkræver (d. 1104)
        1. Henrik Skadelår (c. 1090 – 4 June 1134)
          1. Magnus Henriksen (d. 1161), King of Sweden from 1160, married Brigida, daughter of King Harald IV Gille of Norway
          2. Canute (d. 12 March 1162), Duke of Southern Jutland from 1150, Duke of Jutland from 1157
          3. Buris (1130–1167), Duke of Southern Jutland from 1162, married c. 1166 to a daughter of Herman II, Count of Winzenburg
      9. Niels, killed 25 June 1134, King of Denmark from 1104, married Margaret Fredkulla, a daughter of King Inge the Elder of Sweden
        1. Magnus Nielsen (c. 1106 – 4 June 1134), Duke of Västergötland from 1125, King of Denmark from 1134, married Richeza, a daughter of Bolesław III Wrymouth
          1. Canute V (c. 1129 – 9 August 1157), Duke of Jutland from 1147, co-ruler of Denmark from 1154, married in 1156 to Helena, a daughter of King Sverker I of Sweden
            1. Saint Niels (d. 1180)
            2. Valdemar (d. 18 July 1236 in Cîteaux Abbey), Bishop of Schleswig from 1182 to 1208, Archbishop of Bremen in 1192
    2. Björn (killed in 1049), Earl in England
    3. Asbjörn (d. probably 1086), Jarl in Denmark
  2. Gytha, married Godwin of Wessex; one of their children was King Harold II of England
  3. Eilaf (first mentioned 1009), Earl in England

=== From Eric the Good to Christopher I ===
1. Eric I the Good (c. 1060, Slangerup, Denmark – 10 July 1103, Paphos, Cyprus), Jarl of Zealand from 1080, King of Denmark from 1095 — for his ancestors, see above
  1. Saint Canute Lavard (March 12, 1096 – 7 January 1131), King of Southern Jutland from 1115, King of the Wends from 1129, married Ingeborg, a daughter of Mstislav I of Kiev
    1. Christina (c. 1118–1139), married King Magnus IV of Norway
    2. Valdemar the Great (14 January 1131 – 12 May 1182), King of Denmark, married in 1157 to Sophia of Minsk (d. 5 May 1198), daughter of Volodar of Minsk
      1. (illegitimate) Christopher (d. 1173), Duke of Southern Jutland
      2. Sophie (d. 1208), married Siegfried III, Count of Orlamünde (d. 1206)
      3. Canute VI (1163 – 12 November 1202), King of Denmark from 1182, married in 1177 to Gertrude, daughter of Henry the Lion
      4. Valdemar II (1170 – 28 March 1241), King of Denmark from 1202, married (1) in 1205 to Dagmar, daughter of King Ottokar I of Bohemia, and (2) in 1214 to Berengeria, daughter of King Sancho I of Portugal
        1. (illegitimate) Niels, Count of Halland from 1216 — descendants: the counts of Halland, died out in 1314
        2. (illegitimate) Canute (1211 – 15 October 1260), Duke of Estonia from 1219, Duke of Blekinge from 1232, Duke of Lolland from before 1260, married Hedwig, a daughter of Swietopelk I, Duke of Pomerania — descendants: the Lords of Skarsholm, died out before 1408
        3. (1m) Valdemar (c. 1209 – 28 November 1231), co-ruler of Denmark from 1215, married Eleanor, a daughter of King Afonso II of Portugal
        4. (2m) Eric IV (c. 1216 – 9 August 1250), King of Denmark from 1241, married in 1239 to Jutta, a daughter of Albert I, Duke of Saxony
          1. Sophia (1241–1286), married Valdemar, King of Sweden
          2. Ingeborg (d. 1287), married King Magnus VI of Norway
          3. Jutta (1246–1286/95), mistress of Valdemar, King of Sweden, later Abbess of St. Agneta
          4. Agnes (1249–after 1290), founding Abbess of St. Agneta
        5. Sophie (1217 – 2 November 1247), married in 1230 to John I, Margrave of Brandenburg (d. 3 April 1266)
        6. Abel (1218 – 29 June 1252), King of Denmark from 1250, married Matilda of Holstein (d. 1288) — for his descendants, see below
        7. Christopher I (1219 – 29 May 1259), King of Denmark from 1252, married in 1248 to Margaret Sambiria, daughter of Duke Sambor II of Pomerelia — for his descendants, see below
      5. Ingeborg (1175 – 29 July 1236), married in 1193, to King Philip II of France (d. 14 July 1223)
      6. Helena (c. 1180 – 22 November 1233), married in 1202 to Duke William of Lüneburg (d. 1213)
      7. Rikissa (1190–1220), married King Eric X of Sweden (d. 1216)
  2. Harald Kesja (1080–1135), from 1102 to 1103 regent of Denmark, married Ragnhild Magnusdotter, a daughter of King Magnus III of Norway
    1. Björn Ironside (d.1134), married Katarina Ingesdotter, the daughter of King Inge I of Sweden
      1. Christina (d. 1170), married King Eric IX of Sweden (d. 18 May 1160), King of Sweden from 1156
    2. Olaf (d. c. 1143), Danish anti-king
      1. (illegitimate) Harald Skrænk, leader of a peasant rebellion in Scania, c. 1182
  3. Ragnhild Eriksdatter, married Hakon Sunnivasson
    1. Eric III (c. 1120 – 27 August 1146), King of Denmark from 1137, married in 1155 to Lutgard, the daughter of Count Rudolf I of Stade
      1. (illegitimate) Magnus Eriksen, imprisoned 1178
  4. Eric II (c. 1090 – 18 July 1137), King of Denmark from 1134, married Malmfred, a daughter of Grand Prince Mstislav I of Kiev
    1. Sweyn III (c. 1125 – 23 October 1157), King of Zealand from 1147, King of Denmark from 1152, married Adela, a daughter of Conrad, Margrave of Meissen
      1. Luitgard, married Margrave Berthold I of Istria (d. 1188), Count of Andechs, from 1173 Margrave of Istria

=== Dukes of Schleswig (Abelslægten) ===
1. Abel (1218 – 29 June 1252), King of Denmark from 1250, married Matilda of Holstein (d. 1288) — for his ancestors, see above
  1. Valdemar III (d. 1257), Duke of Duchy of Schleswig, (or, as the Danes call it, Southern Jutland) from 1253
  2. Sophie (born 1240, d. aft. 1284), married Bernhard I, Prince of Anhalt-Bernburg (ca. 1218–1287); Christian I of Denmark was their great-great-great-great-grandson, the current Queen Margaret II descends from Christian I
  3. Eric I (d. 27 May 1272), Duke of Schleswig from 1260, married Margaret, a daughter of Jaromar II, Prince of Rugia
    1. Valdemar IV (d. 1312), Duke of Schleswig from 1283, married Elisabeth, a daughter of John I, Duke of Saxony
      1. Eric II (c. 1290 – 12 March 1325), Duke of Schleswig from 1312, married Adelaide, a daughter of Henry I, Count of Holstein-Rendsburg
        1. Valdemar V (1314–1364), Duke of Schleswig from 1325 to 1326 and from 1330 to 1364, King of Denmark as Valdemar III from 1326 to 1330, married Richardis, a daughter of Gunzelin VI, Count of Schwerin
          1. Valdemar (c. 1338 – 1360)
          2. Henry (c. 1342 – August 1375), Duke of Schleswig from 1364
        2. Helvig (d. 1374), married King Valdemar IV of Denmark (d. 24 October 1375) (see below)
        3. (illegitimate) Valdemar Eriksen Sappi (d. 1398)
      2. (illegitimate) Abel Valdemarsen — descendants: the Rynd family (died out in 1405)
    2. Margaret (d. after 1313), married Helmold III, Count of Schwerin
    3. Eric Longbone (1272–1310), Lord of Langeland, married Sophie, a daughter of Burchard VII, Burgrave of Magdeburg
  4. Abel (1252 – 2 April 1279), Lord of Langeland, married Matilda, a daughter of Gunzelin III, Count of Schwerin

=== From Christopher I to Margaret I ===
1. Christopher I (1219 – 29 May 1259), King of Denmark from 1252, married in 1248 to Margaret Sambiria, daughter of Duke Sambor II of Pomerelia — for his ancestors, see above
  1. Eric V "Klipping" (1249 – November 22, 1286), King of Denmark from 1259, married Agnes, a daughter of John I, Margrave of Brandenburg
    1. Eric VI Menved (1274 – 13 November 1319), King of Denmark from 1286, married Ingeborg Magnusdotter (1277-1319), a daughter of King Magnus Ladulås of Sweden
    2. Christopher II (29 September 1276 – 2 August 1332), King of Denmark from 1320 to 1326 and from 1329 to 1332, married Euphemia, a daughter of Bogislaw IV, Duke of Pomerania
      1. Margaret, (1305–1340), married Louis V, Duke of Bavaria (d. 18 September 1361)
      2. Eric (1305 – 1331 or 1332), Elected King of Denmark in 1321, married Elisabeth, a daughter of Henry I, Count of Holstein-Rendsburg
      3. Otto (c. 1310 – after 1341), Duke of Lolland and Estonia
      4. Valdemar IV "Atterdag" (c. 1320 – 24 October 1375), King of Denmark from 1340, married Helvig, a daughter of Eric II, Duke of Schleswig (see above)
        1. Christopher (d. 11 June 1363), Duke of Lolland from 1359
        2. Ingeborg (1 April 1347 – before 16 June 1370), married Henry III, Duke of Mecklenburg (d. 24 April 1383), the grandparents of Eric of Pomerania, King of Norway as Eric III, King of Denmark as Eric VII, and King of Sweden as Eric XIII
        3. Margaret I (March 1353 – 28 October 1412), Queen regnant of Denmark from 1375 to 1385 and from 1387 to 1396, Queen regnant of Norway from 1380 to 1385 and from 1387 to 1398, Queen regnant of Sweden from 1389 to 1396, co-founder of the Union of Kalmar in 1397, married in 1363 to Haakon Magnusson (d. 1380), King of Norway from 1355 as Haakon VI, King of Sweden from 1362 to 1364 as Håkan (they had one son who belonged to the Swedish dynasty)
      5. (illegitimate) Erik Christoffersen Løvenbalk, his male line descendants, the Løvenbalk family, died out after June 1598; Frederick VIII, Duke of Schleswig-Holstein descends from him in the female line and his granddaughter married back into the Danish royal family
    3. Richeza (d. before 27 October 1318), married Lord Nicholas II of Werle (d. 1316); Christian I of Denmark was their great-great-great-grandson, the current Queen Margaret II descends from Christian I
    4. Martha (d. 2 March 1341), married in 1298 to Birger Magnusson (d. 31 May 1321), King of Sweden from 1290
  2. Matilda, married Albert III, Margrave of Brandenburg-Salzwedel (d. 1300)
  3. Margaret (c. 1257 – 1306), married to John II, Count of Holstein-Kiel (d. 1321)

== See also ==
- Template:House of Estridsen
- House of Olaf
- House of Knýtlinga
- House of Oldenburg
