= Jutta of Denmark =

- Abbess of St. Agneta
- Reign: 1266-1270
- Born: 1246
- Died: 1286/95
- Issue: Erik of Sweden (Illegitimate)
- House: House of Estridsen
- Father: Eric IV of Denmark
- Mother: Jutta of Saxony
- Religion: Roman Catholicism

Jutta of Denmark also known as Judith (1246-1286/95) was a daughter of Eric IV of Denmark and his wife Jutta of Saxony. She was a younger sister of Queen Sophia of Sweden, and Queen Ingeborg of Norway, as well as an older sister of Agnes. Jutta was also mistress for a brief period of time to her brother-in-law Valdemar, King of Sweden. Jutta was a member of the House of Estridsen.

== Life ==
In 1250, when Jutta was around four years old, her father was murdered. Her mother remarried to Burgrave Burchard VIII of Magdeburg. Her two eldest sisters Sophia and Ingeborg were soon married off, while Jutta and her sister Agnes were placed in St. Agnes' Priory, Roskilde. Neither Jutta or Agnes could find pleasure in the tough and lonely monastic life.

In 1269, her sister queen Sophia of Sweden stopped at their father's grave in Denmark on a visit to her sisters, Agnes and Jutta in Roskilde. In 1272, Jutta journeyed to Sweden where she became the mistress to her brother-in-law, Valdemar. The affair resulted in a child who was born in 1273. The boy was named Erik although, some dispute this. The following year, Jutta was again placed in the convent of St. Agneta, and Valdemar was forced to make a pilgrimage to Rome to ask for the Pope's absolution. According to legend, Queen Sophia said: I will never recover from this sorrow. Curse the day my sister saw the kingdom of Sweden Sophia and Valdemar later separated.

Jutta remained in the convent for the rest of her life. Eric V of Denmark (Jutta's cousin) denied Jutta and Agnes their rightful inheritance from their father; this, however, was settled in 1284 when the sisters received their inheritance. Judith died sometime between 1286 and 1295. Around the same time, Agnes supposedly married her cousin Eric Longbone, Lord of Langeland. Sophia died in 1286.

== Ancestry ==
Ancestors of Jutta of Denmark

16. Canute Lavard
8. Valdemar I of Denmark
17. Ingeborg of Kiev
4. Valdemar II of Denmark
18. Volodar of Minsk
9. Sophia of Minsk
19. Richeza of Poland
2. Eric IV of Denmark
20. Afonso I of Portugal
10. Sancho I of Portugal
21. Maud of Savoy
5. Berengaria of Portugal
22. Ramon Berenguer IV, Count of Barcelona
11. Dulce of Aragon
23. Petronila of Aragon
1. Jutta of Denmark
24. Albert the Bear
12. Bernard III, Duke of Saxony
25. Sophie of Winzenburg
6. Albert I, Duke of Saxony
26. Canute V of Denmark
13. Birgitte of Denmark
3. Jutta of Saxony
28. Leopold V, Duke of Austria
14. Leopold VI, Duke of Austria
29. Helena of Hungary
7. Agnes of Austria
30. Isaac Komnenos Vatatzes
15. Theodora Angelina
31. Anna Angelina
