= Margaret Sambiria =

Queen of Denmark from 1252 to 1259

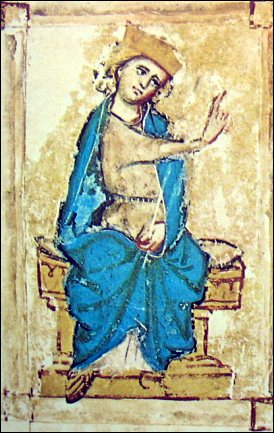

Queen consort of Denmark
- Tenure: 1252–1259
- Coronation: 25 December 1252, Lund

Regent of Denmark
- Regency: 1259–1264
- Monarch: Eric V of Denmark

Lady of Estonia
- Reign: 1266–1282
- Predecessor: Eric V of Denmark
- Successor: Eric V of Denmark
- Born: c. 1230; Germany
- Died: December 1282
- Burial: Doberan Abbey
- Spouse: Christopher I of Denmark
- Issue among others...: Eric V of Denmark
- Father: Sambor II, Duke of Pomerania
- Mother: Matilda of Mecklenburg

Margaret Sambiria (Danish: Margrethe Sambiria, Sambirsdatter or Margrethe Sprænghest; c. 1230 – December 1282) was Queen of Denmark by marriage to King Christopher I, and regent during the minority of her son, King Eric V from 1259 until 1264. She is the first woman confirmed to have formally ruled as regent of Denmark. She was the reigning fief-holder of Danish Estonia in 1266–1282.

== Life ==
Margaret was born around 1230 to Sambor II, Duke of Pomerania and Matilda of Mecklenburg.

She had a Danish connection from her maternal grandparents Henry Borwin II, Lord of Mecklenburg and Lady Kristina from Scania, who was reportedly a daughter of the Danish magnate Galen clan from Eastern Denmark, and related to the Hvide clan of Zealand. Margaret received her first name, then yet relatively rare in North Germany and Poland, in honor of her maternal Scandinavian relations, where the name Margaret came in the late 11th century with the family of Inge I of Sweden, presumably of her aunt, the countess of Schwerin, and her great-aunt, the Princess of Rugia.

=== Queen ===
In 1248, she married Prince Christopher, the youngest son of Valdemar II of Denmark and Berengária of Portugal. In accordance with the then succession custom of agnatic seniority, her husband ascended the throne of Denmark in 1252. Margaret was crowned with him on 25 December 1252 at Lund Cathedral.

Already as queen, Margaret was reportedly involved in politics. During the reign of Christopher, there was a conflict between the king and Jakob Erlandsen, Archbishop of the Diocese of Lund who demanded autonomy of the church from the crown, with the right to hold his own armies, a demand which lead to his arrest. This was a conflict which Margaret was to inherit as regent.

=== Regent ===
Her husband died on 29 May 1259, rumored to have been poisoned. Their son and heir Eric V of Denmark was a child, and Margaret was made regent until her son's maturity in 1264. This was unprecedented in Denmark, as no queen or queen dowager, as far as it is known, had until then formally and officially have the mandate as regent of Denmark.

Regent Margaret was faced with the unresolved conflict between the crown and the archbishop Jakob Erlandsen. She was forced to release the archbishop to consolidate her position as regent, but resolved the conflict of power between the church and the crown by banishing the archbishop from the kingdom: the question of the church's autonomy from the Danish crown was not settled until some years after her son's maturity, but Margaret continued to negotiate with the Pope until she solved the matter, even after her mandate as regent was terminated.

She was also faced with having to protect her son's right to the throne against the claims of the sons of her brother-in-law Abel of Denmark, whose claims to the throne was raised by Abel's widow Matilda of Holstein, as well as given the responsibility of the four daughters of her other brother-in-law Eric IV of Denmark, Sophia, Ingeborg, Jutta and Agnes. Her son's succession overrode the rights of the descendants of earlier monarchs, counter to the dictates of agnatic seniority.

The conflict with the sons of Matilda of Holstein resulted in warfare with the counts of Holstein. After a loss in Lohede in 1261, Margaret, together with her son, the young Eric V were imprisoned by the Count of Holstein. They soon managed to escape with help from Albert of Brunswick. She was not able to prevent the marriage alliances between Abel's widow Matilda of Holstein and Birger Jarl, or Eric IV's daughters Sophia and Ingeborg to the kings of Norway and Sweden, but she was able to prevent Eric IV's remaining daughters Jutta and Agnes from similar marriage alliances by placing them in the convent St. Agnes' Priory, Roskilde.

In 1263, Margaret successfully wrote to Pope Urban IV, asking him to allow women to inherit the Danish throne, in a final effort to prevent the claims of the Abel-fraction on the Danish throne. This would make it possible for one of Eric's sisters to become reigning Queen of Denmark in the event of Erik V's dying before he had any children.

In her own time, Margaret had a reputation as a competent and enlightened regent. Her nicknames, "Sprænghest" ('Burst-horse') and "Sorte Grete" ('Black Greta') reveal a strong-willed, energetic personality.

=== Later life ===
Margaret retired as regent in 1264, when her son was declared an adult, and she officially settled with her own court in her personal residence Nykøbing Slot on Falster. She continued to play a role in Danish politics and kept an interest and certain influence over Danish state affairs.

In 1266, her son the king granted her the rulership of Danish Estonia, and made her ruling countess of the province for life. She actively settled the affairs of Estonia from her residence in Denmark until her death.

In 1270 she founded and donated money to the Abbey of the Holy Cross in Rostock.

She died in December 1282 and was buried in the church of the Cistercian Doberan Abbey on the Baltic Sea coast of Germany.

== Children ==
Margaret and Christopher had at least three children:

- Matilda (died 23 April 1299/19 November 1300), married to Albert III, Margrave of Brandenburg-Salzwedel.
- Margaret (died 1306), married to John II, Count of Holstein-Kiel.
- Eric V of Denmark (1249–1286).

== Related reading ==
- Anne J. Duggan, ed (2002) Queens and Queenship in Medieval Europe (Boydell Press) ISBN 9780851158815
- John Carmi Parsons, ed (2016) Medieval Queenship (Springer Publishing Company) ISBN 9781137088598

Margaret Sambiria House of Sobiesław Born: 1230 Died: 1 December 1282
Danish royalty
Preceded by Matilda of Holstein	Queen consort of Denmark; 1252–1259	Succeeded by Agnes of Brandenburg
