= Canute of Denmark =

Canute of Denmark - Danish: Knud - may refer to:

- Six kings of Denmark
  - Harthacnut I of Denmark or Canute I the Hardy, legendary King of Denmark (916/17–934)
  - Cnut the Great, Canute II the Great, (985/95–1035), King of Denmark (1018–1035), Norway and England
  - Harthacnut, Canute III the Hardy, (1020–1042), King of Denmark (1035–1042) and England
  - Canute IV of Denmark, the Saint, (1042–1086), King of Denmark (1080–1086)
  - Canute V of Denmark, Canute V Magnussen, (1129–1157), King of Denmark (1146–1157)
  - Canute VI of Denmark, Canute VI Valdemarsen, (1163–1202), King of Denmark (1182–1202)
- Six princes of Denmark
  - Canute Danaást (d. 962), son of king Gorm the Old
  - Canute Lavard (1090–1131), son of king Eric I of Denmark
  - Canute Haraldsen (d. 1135), son of Harald Kesja
  - Canute Eriksen (d. bef. 1250), son of king Eric IV of Denmark
  - Canute, Duke of Estonia (1205–1260), bastard son of Valdemar II of Denmark
  - Knud, Hereditary Prince of Denmark (1900–1976), son of king Christian X of Denmark
