= Eric of Denmark =

Eric of Denmark – Danish: Erik - may refer to:

- Eric I of Denmark
- Eric II of Denmark
- Eric III of Denmark
- Eric IV of Denmark
- Eric V of Denmark
- Eric VI of Denmark
- Eric VII of Denmark, better known as Eric of Pomerania
- Eric Longbone, Lord of Langeland
- Eric Christoffersen of Denmark
- Eric I, Duke of Schleswig
- Eric II, Duke of Schleswig
- Count Erik of Rosenborg
