= Sophia of Denmark =

Queen of Sweden from 1261 to 1275

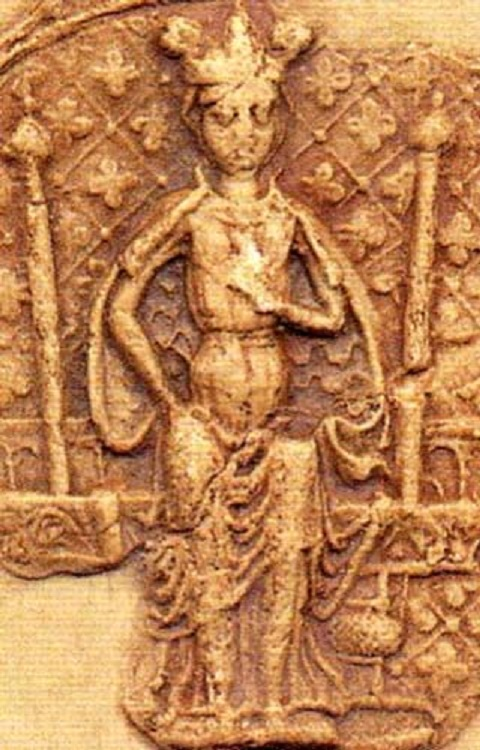

Queen consort of Sweden
- Tenure: 1261–1275
- Born: 1241
- Died: 1286 (aged 44–45)
- Spouse: Valdemar of Sweden (m. 1260)
- Issue more...: Ingeborg, Countess of Holstein-Plön; Marina, Countess of Diepholz; Richeza, High Duchess of Poland
- House: Estridsen
- Father: Eric IV of Denmark
- Mother: Jutta of Saxony

Sophia of Denmark (Danish: Sofie Eriksdatter and Swedish: Sofia Eriksdotter; 1241–1286) was Queen of Sweden as the consort of King Valdemar.

== Background ==
Sophia was the eldest daughter of Eric IV of Denmark and Jutta of Saxony. She had no brothers, but three sisters, Ingeborg, Agnes and Jutta. Her father was murdered in 1250 when she and her sisters were children. As he left no son, he was succeeded by his brother Abel, and then in 1252 by his second brother Christopher I.

== Marriage ==
The marriage between Sophia of Denmark and King Valdemar of Sweden was arranged as a part of the policy of peaceful diplomacy between Denmark and Sweden which was favored by Birger Jarl, Valdemar's father and the de facto Regent of Sweden. In 1254, Birger Jarl had acted as a mediator between Christopher I and King Haakon of Norway, and when Christopher I needed support against Archbishop Jakob Erlandsen of Lund, an alliance was made between Christopher I, King Haakon of Norway and Birger Jarl in 1258. In connection to this, Christopher I engaged his niece Sophia to Birger's son Valdemar of Sweden, and his niece Ingeborg to Haakon's son Magnus VI of Norway. A dispensation from the Pope was necessary to allow a marriage within the degree of affinity, which was granted by Alexander IV 1 March 1259 with the motivation that Swedes and Danes would through this marriage be more able to fight against their neighboring Pagans. In Erikskrönikan it is said that when she was informed about the arranged marriage, she left the room, went into her chamber and asked the Virgin Mary: "Give me happiness with him and him with me."

== Queenship ==
According to Erikskrönikan, the wedding between Sophia and Valdemar took place in 1260 at Ymninge (likely Öninge in Ödeshög), and was described as a grand event with tournaments, dance, games and poetry. Sophia was given the income from Malmö and Trelleborg as well as a fortune in gold and silver as her dowry. However, her position at the wedding was already somewhat less fortunate than when the engagement was announced. Her father-in-law Birger Jarl himself married her uncle Abel's widow, Denmark's queen dowager Matilda of Holstein, and Sophia was thereby given the widow of her uncle Abel, pointed out as her father's murderer, as her mother-in-law. At the time of her wedding, her uncle Christopher I was succeeded by Eric V of Denmark under the regency of Margaret Sambiria, who refused to acknowledge Sophia's right to the inheritance after her father until 1263.

Sophia was described in the chronicles as a politically interested, proud beauty with a sharp tongue and an interest in chess. Not many details are known about her, but her seal as a queen is preserved, as well as the names of two of her ladies-in-waiting: Margareta Ragnildsdotter and Ingrid.

In 1266, her spouse finally became King de facto after the death of his father Birger Jarl, and her mother-in-law left Sweden. In the conflict between King Valdemar and his brothers, Queen Sophia took the king's side and reportedly also made the conflict worse by insulting her brothers-in-law: she famously called Duke Magnus Birgersson "ket-laböther" ('Magnus the Tinker') and Duke Eric Birgersson "Erik alls intet" ('Really-nothing-Eric').

While Sophia herself and her sister Ingeborg had been married to Kings, their sisters Agnes and Jutta had been forced to become nuns by the Danish regent, to avoid that more of the huge fortune of the sisters were to leave Denmark. In 1271, Agnes and Jutta escaped from the convent in Roskilde and fled to their sister Queen Sophia in Sweden. They were kindly welcomed at the Swedish royal court, but Jutta and Valdemar made a scandal by having an affair. It may have resulted in a child in 1273. The scandal – not only adultery, but also incest, as the church regarded a sister-in-law as a true sister – reportedly led to Valdemar having to make a pilgrimage to Rome to ask for the Pope's absolution. Whether he actually performed the pilgrimage is uncertain. According to the chronicles Queen Sophia commented: "I will never recover from this sorrow. Curse the day my sister saw the kingdom of Sweden."

In 1274, open civil war broke out in Sweden when the king's brothers, Dukes Magnus and Eric, challenged him for the throne. After the Battle of Hova in June 1275, Duke Magnus proclaimed himself King of Sweden. The news famously reached the queen while she was playing chess. King Valdemar used Sophia's connections and allied with the King of Denmark and Norway against Magnus, but without success. He then attempted to ally with Brandenburg and the Princes of Northern Germany by arranging a marriage between his daughter Ingeborg and Gerhard II of Holstein, and by pawning Gotland to Brandenburg. Sophia sided with Valdemar during the conflict: on 8 September 1277, she as well as Valdemar signed the letter pawning the island of Gotland to Bandenburg in Copenhagen.

== Later life ==
In 1278, Valdemar finally accepted to abdicate permanently in favor of his brother Magnus and took the title quondam rex (former king), and was given some lands in Västergötland and Östergötland. Valdemar settled in Denmark in 1280, while Sophia remained in Sweden. From this point on, they lived separate lives.

Queen Sophia referred to herself as regina quondam (former queen) and senior regina (senior queen). She is mentioned in several business documents, such as when she donated the income from the salmon fishing in Norrköping to Skänninge Abbey in 1283. The following year, a Danish court in Nyborg finally settled the matter of her and her sisters inheritance and gave them access to all the lands inherited by their father in Denmark. About the same time, King Magnus had his brother Valdemar in practice declared unfit to manage his business (he eventually had Valdemar imprisoned in 1288). It is unclear how, and if, this affected Sophia, but Magnus did take over the management of the estates of Valdemar and the guardianship of Sophia's daughter's, whose marriages he arranged.

Sophia died in 1286. One source claims she was buried in Vreta Abbey, and another in Ringsted Abbey in Denmark. Her husband was imprisoned in 1288 and lived openly with mistresses in his comfortable prison until his death in 1302.

== Issue ==
Sophia had six children:

1. Ingeborg (1263–1292), countess of Holstein, married to Gerhard II, Count of Holstein-Plön
2. Eric (1272–1330), riksråd, Danish throne claimant in 1328–29.
3. Marina, married in 1285 to Rudolf, Count of Diepholz
4. Richeza (d. c. 1292), Queen of Poland, married in 1285 to Przemysł II of Poland
5. Catherine (d. 1283)
6. Margaret (d. after 1288), nun at Skänninge Abbey from 1288.

== Notes ==
Sofia Eriksdotter Born: 1241 Died: 1286
Swedish royalty
Preceded by Catherine of Ymseborg	Queen consort of Sweden; 1261–1275	Succeeded by Helvig of Holstein
