= Ingeborg of Kalundborg =

Danish noble and influential landlord of Kalundborg

Ingeborg Esbensdatter of Kalundborg (died in Slesvig 1267) was an influential Danish landlord and vassal.

She was the daughter of Esbern Snare and the Swedish noble Helena Guttormsdotter, and by her mother the half sister of Canute, Duke of Estonia. She married the nobleman Peder Strangesen (d. 1241). Ingeborg was known for her donations to the church and was a powerful figure in Denmark by her ownership of her late father's castle, Kalundborg, and was called "Powerful Lady" and "Ingeborg of Kalundborg" because of it. She seem to have favored the side of duke Eric Abelsen in his conflict with the Danish royal house in 1261. The year after, she was forced to leave Kalundborg and flee to Slesvig.
