= Guttorm =

Guttorm is a masculine Norwegian given name. Notable people with the name include:

- Guttorm of Norway (1199–1204), King of Norway
- Guttorm Berge (1929–2004), Norwegian alpine skier
- Guttorm Fløistad (born 1930), Norwegian philosopher
- Guttorm Fløistad (politician) (1878–1953), Norwegian politician
- Guttorm Granum (1904–1963), Norwegian politician
- Guttorm Gunnhildsson, Norwegian Viking
- Guttorm Guttormsen (born 1950), Norwegian musician
- Guttorm Guttormsgaard (1938–2019). Norwegian visual artist, educator and art collector
- Guttorm Hansen (1920–2009), Norwegian writer and politician
- Guttorm Haraldsson, Norwegian noble
- Guttorm Schjelderup (born 1961), Norwegian economist
- Guttorm Vik (born 1943), Norwegian diplomat
