= Helena Guttormsdotter =

Swedish noble and landholder

Helena Guttormsdotter, fl 1205, was a Swedish noble and landholder, known as the royal mistress of Valdemar II of Denmark.

Helena was the daughter of a Swedish Jarl, Guttorm. She married the Danish noble Esbern Snare and became the mother of Lady Ingeborg of Kalundborg. She was widowed in 1204, and had a relationship with Valdemar II, with whom she had Canute, Duke of Estonia. The relationship was terminated when he married Dagmar of Bohemia. Helena returned to Sweden, where she founded the chapel Vår Frus kapell in Linköping. She was a landholder in Sweden, and left her estates there to her son after her death.
