= Guttorm Vik =

Norwegian diplomat

Guttorm Asbjørn Vik (born 28 July 1943) is a Norwegian diplomat.

He grew up in Brattvåg, graduated with the siv.øk. from the Norwegian School of Economics in 1971 and started working in the Ministry of Foreign Affairs in 1972.

He was a deputy under-secretary of State in the Ministry of Foreign Affairs from 1994. From 1995 to 2000 he served as vice secretary-genera of EFTA. He then served as the Norwegian ambassador to Iceland from 2003 to 2007 and the OSCE in Vienna from 2007 to 2011. He then became a senior adviser in the Ministry of Foreign Affairs until his retirement in 2013.

He resides at Høvik.
