= Agnes of Denmark =

- Abbess of St. Agneta
- Reign: 1264-1266
- Born: 1249
- Died: after 1290 (At least 41)
- House: House of Estridsen
- Father: Eric IV of Denmark
- Mother: Jutta of Saxony
- Religion: Roman Catholicism

Agnes of Denmark (1249 – after 1290) was the youngest daughter of Eric IV of Denmark and his wife Jutta of Saxony. She was the official founder of the St. Agnes' Priory, Roskilde, becoming prioress there.

== Life ==
Agnes lost her father at the age of one, and after her mother left for remarriage in Germany, she and her sisters Ingeborg, Sophia and Jutta remained to be raised at the court of her paternal uncle, the king of Denmark. The four sisters had the right to large estates after their father, but were not able to enforce them against their uncle, who deposed their father.

=== Monastic life ===
Her sisters Ingeborg and Sophia married the kings of Norway and Sweden respectively, and left Denmark with their inheritance. This was not to happen with Agnes and Jutta however. In 1264, a convent for women of the Dominican order, St. Agnes' Priory, Roskilde, was founded and named after her. The application was sent to the Pope in the name of Agnes, and who expressed her wish to devote herself and her inheritance to the convent. The regent of Denmark, Margaret Sambiria, was forced to swear that Agnes had taken this initiative by her own freed will, before the approval was given. In reality, the Danish regent did not wish to have more of the large inheritance of the daughters of Eric IV leave Denmark, which would be the case if Agnes and her sister Jutta married foreign princes and left Denmark, as their sisters Ingeborg and Sophia had done.

After the foundation of St. Agnes' Priory, Agnes was placed there by the Regent Margaret as Prioress. In 1266, the regent placed her sister Jutta in the convent as well, replacing her as prioress.

=== Later life ===
Both sisters greatly disliked the life as nuns, and they both left the convent in 1270. Agnes seems to have managed to gain control over at least part of her father's estates. She lived the rest of her life managing her estates at Själland, and there are several documents mentioning her acts as a landowner. She was last mentioned alive in 1290. The year of her death is unknown. Agnes supposedly married her cousin Eric Longbone, Lord of Langeland.

The Danish Royal House and the Saint Agnes Abbey battled over her inheritance until the Danish Reformation.

== Ancestry ==
Ancestors of Agnes of Denmark

16. Canute Lavard
8. Valdemar I of Denmark
17. Ingeborg of Kiev
4. Valdemar II of Denmark
18. Volodar of Minsk
9. Sophia of Minsk
19. Richeza of Poland
2. Eric IV of Denmark
20. Afonso I of Portugal
10. Sancho I of Portugal
21. Maud of Savoy
5. Berengaria of Portugal
22. Ramon Berenguer IV, Count of Barcelona
11. Dulce of Aragon
23. Petronila of Aragon
1. Agnes of Denmark
24. Albert the Bear
12. Bernard III, Duke of Saxony
25. Sophie of Winzenburg
6. Albert I, Duke of Saxony
26. Canute V of Denmark
13. Birgitte of Denmark
3. Jutta of Saxony
28. Leopold V, Duke of Austria
14. Leopold VI, Duke of Austria
29. Helena of Hungary
7. Agnes of Austria
Isaac Komnenos Vatatzes
15. Theodora Angelina
Anna Komnena Angelina
