= Jutta of Saxony =

Queen of Denmark from 1239 to 1250

Judith of Saxony
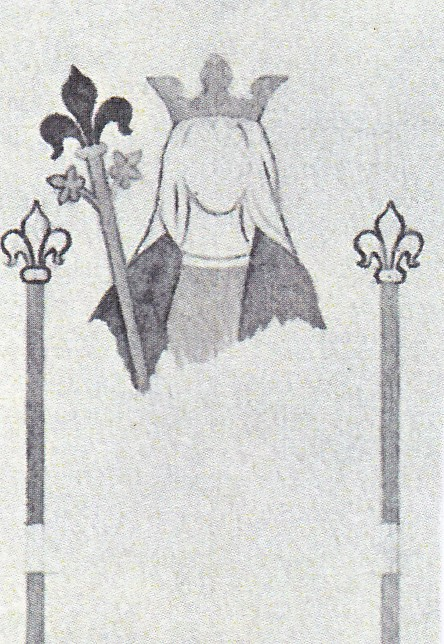

Queen consort of Denmark
- Tenure: 1239–1250
- Born: c. 1223
- Died: Before 2 February 1267
- Spouses: Eric IV of Denmark; Burchard VIII, Count of Querfurt-Rosenburg
- Issue among others...: Sophia, Queen of Sweden; Ingeborg, Queen of Norway; Jutta, Abbess of St. Agneta; Agnes, Abbes of St. Agneta; Sophia, Duchess of Langeland
- House: Ascania
- Father: Albert I, Duke of Saxony
- Mother: Agnes of Austria

Jutta of Saxony (c. 1223 – before 2 February 1267) was Queen of Denmark as the wife of King Eric IV of Denmark. She was the daughter of Albert I, Duke of Saxony. She married king Erik in 1239, and became junior queen consort, since her husband was junior king, even though there was no senior queen at the time. She would become senior queen in 1242.

Not many details are known about Queen Jutta. She was involved in a conflict with the monks of Øm Abbey, from whom she confiscated corn from their estates and shipped it to her own. Her signature was also on the instruction regarding the funeral service of her spouse, in which he expressed the wish to be buried in the clothes of a monk. She was queen for eight years and widowed in 1250 when her spouse was murdered. She is believed to have returned to Saxony as a widow, leaving her daughters in Denmark.

Jutta married a second time and became the first wife of Count Burchard VIII of Querfurt-Rosenburg, who held function and title of Burgrave of Magdeburg (recorded between 1273 and 1313), a son of Burgrave Burchard VI (recorded between 1221 and 1273).

== Issue ==
Jutta and Eric had:

- Sophia of Denmark, (1241–1286) married to King Valdemar of Sweden
- Canute (Knud) of Denmark (b. & d. 1242)
- Ingeborg of Denmark (1244–1287), married to King Magnus VI of Norway
- Jutta of Denmark, prioress of St. Agnes' Priory, Roskilde (1246–1284)
- Christopher of Denmark (b. & d. 1247)
- Agnes of Denmark, prioress of St. Agnes' Priory, Roskilde (1249–1288/95)

Jutta and Burchard had:

- Sophia Burghardsdatter von Querfurt-Rosenburg (d. 1325), married with Erik Erikssøn Langben (1272–1310), Duke of Langeland, son of Eric I, Duke of Schleswig

== Sources ==
- Alf Henrikson: Dansk historia (Danish history) (1989) (Swedish)
- Sven Rosborn (In Swedish): När hände vad i Nordens historia (When did what happen in the history of the Nordic countries) (1997)
- Dansk biografisk Lexikon / VIII. Bind. Holst - Juul (in Danish)
- Line, Philip (2007). Kingship and State Formation in Sweden: 1130 - 1290. Brill.600
- Skovgaard-Petersen, Inge (1998). "Queenship in Medieval Denmark". In Parmi, John Carmi (ed.). Medieval Queenship. St. Martin's Press.

Jutta of Saxony House of Ascania Born: circa 1223 Died: before 2 February 1267
Danish royalty
Vacant Title last held by Eleanor of Portugal as junior queen	Queen consort of Denmark; 1239–1250	Vacant Title next held by Matilda of Holstein
