= Eric Longlegs, Lord of Langeland =

Danish noble

Erik Eriksøn, also known as Eric Longlegs (Danish: Erik Langben), (1272–1310), Lord of Langeland, was the second son of Eric I, Duke of Schleswig and younger brother of Valdemar IV, Duke of Schleswig.

== Life ==
Eric was born in 1272 as the second son of Eric I, Duke of Schleswig, by his wife Margaret of Rugia. He held the island of Langeland in fief and inherited the properties of the ducal family in southern Funen, just as his uncle, Abel, Lord of Langeland, had before him. He is mentioned for the first time as responsible for the killing of the seneschal Skjalm Stigsen on 23 August 1292. The murder was probably a result of the enmity caused when King Eric VI of Denmark, after coming of age, confiscated the fief of Langeland and the properties of the ducal family in southern Funen.

Together with his brother, Duke Valdemar, he joined the king's enemies. In 1293, there was a clash between the two parties at Sommersted Heath near Haderslev which resulted in a compromise where Eric received Langeland as a fief.

Subsequently, he married Sophia of Querfurt, a daughter of Jutta of Saxony, widow of King Eric IV of Denmark in her second marriage to Burchard VIII, Count of Querfurt-Rosenburg. Sophia was thus a half-sister of King Eric IV's daughters, among which were the deceased Queen Ingeborg of Norway, mother of King Eric II of Norway. The marriage thus connected Eric to the king of Norway, who knighted him, and also led to a new conflict with King Eric VI, who retained his wife's inheritance from her half-sisters.

On 3 February 1296 a compromise was entered in Vordingborg, in which the king promised to hand over Sophia's inheritance, but where the ducal family's properties in southern Funen, which had formerly belonged to Abel, Lord of Langeland, were kept by the king as lawfully acquired from Abel's daughter. Only the city of Rudkøbing was transferred to become part of the fief of Langeland, and Eric confirmed the city's rights on the same day.

Eric died in 1310. In 1315, Sophia, in the presence of the king and several noblemen, donated the inheritance of her sisters to Saint Agnes' Priory in Roskilde, keeping only the city of Skælskør for herself.

== Marriage and issue ==
Eric married Sophia of Querfurt, a daughter of Burchard VIII, Count of Querfurt-Rosenburg, Burgrave of Magdeburg and Jutta of Saxony, widow of Eric IV of Denmark. The marriage was childless.

== Ancestry ==
Ancestors of Eric Longlegs, Lord of Langeland

16. Valdemar I of Denmark
8. Valdemar II of Denmark
17. Sophia of Minsk
4. Abel of Denmark
18. Sancho I of Portugal
9. Berengaria of Portugal
19. Dulce of Aragon
2. Eric I, Duke of Schleswig
20. Adolf III, Count of Holstein
10. Adolf IV, Count of Holstein
21. Adelheid of Querfurt
5. Matilda of Holstein
22. Hermann II, Lord of Lippe
11. Heilwig of Lippe
23. Oda of Tecklenburg
1. Eric Longlegs, Lord of Langeland
24. Jaromar I, Prince of Rügen
12. Wizlaw I, Prince of Rügen
25. Hildegard of Denmark
6. Jaromar II, Prince of Rügen
13. Margaret, niece of bishop Absalon
3. Margaret of Rügen
28. Mestwin I, Duke of Pomerania
14. Swietopelk II, Duke of Pomerania
29. Swinisława, maybe daughter of Mieszko III the Old
7. Euphemia of Pomerania
30. Odon of Poznań
15. Euphrosyne of Poznań
31. Viacheslava of Halych
