= Valdemar the Young =

Junior King of Denmark from 1215 to 1231

Valdemar (III) the Young
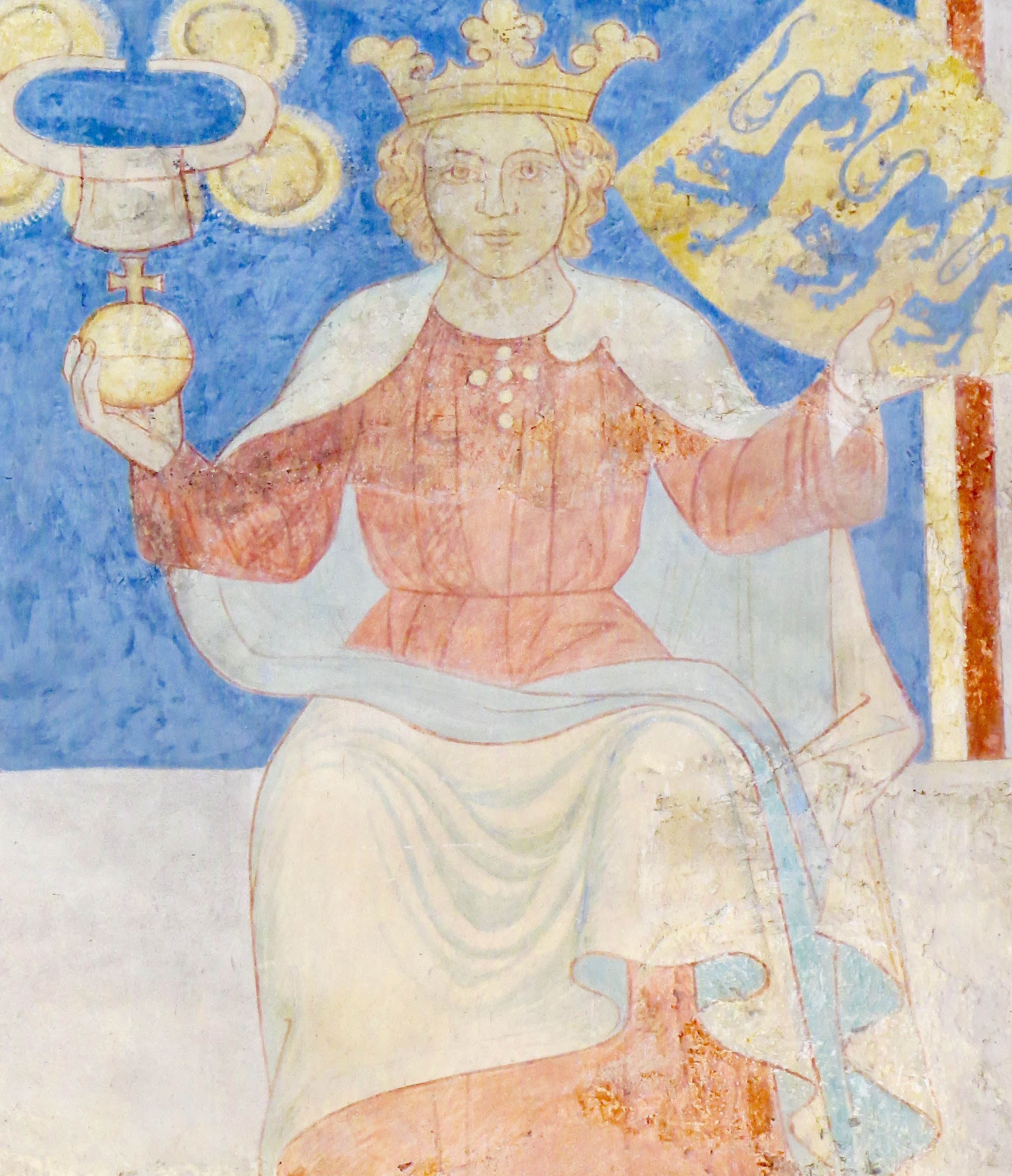
- Image of Valdemar in St. Bendt's Church

Junior King of Denmark
- Reign: 1215–1231
- Coronation: 1218
- Senior king: Valdemar II the Victorious
- Born: c. 1209
- Died: 28 November 1231 (aged 21–22); Refsnæs, near Kalundborg
- Burial: St. Bendt's Church
- Spouse: Eleanor of Portugal
Names
- Valdemar Valdemarsen
- House: Estridsen
- Father: Valdemar II of Denmark
- Mother: Dagmar of Bohemia

Valdemar (III) the Young (Danish: Valdemar den Unge) (c. 1209 – 28 November 1231) was a junior King of Denmark from 1215 until his death.

Valdemar was the eldest son and co-ruler of King Valdemar II of Denmark by his first wife, Dagmar of Bohemia. He did not outlive his father so was never a sole monarch. He is sometimes referred to as Valdemar III for example his tombstone reads in Latin: Waldemarus Tertius Rex Daniae, Filius Waldemari Secundi "Valdemar the Third, King of Denmark, son of Valdemar the Second". Although Valdemar III is more commonly used to denote a later king, Valdemar of Schleswig.

== Early life ==
Valdemar was born in 1209. He was the eldest child from his father's first marriage. His mother, Queen Dagmar, died in childbirth in 1212, leaving her husband a widower with a young son; she had been very popular among the Danish people due to her piety and kindness to the common people.

King Valdemar remarried two years later to Berengaria of Portugal. From this marriage Valdemar the Young gained four half-siblings: Sophie, Eric, Abel and Christopher. His new stepmother, a beautiful and haughty woman, unpopular and scorned by the Danish people, was a great contrast to Valdemar's mother Dagmar. When Berengaria died in childbirth herself in 1221, King Valdemar did not remarry.

== The Junior King ==
At a meeting of the Danish magnates, which King Valdemar arranged at Samsø in 1215, everyone agreed to swear an oath to Valdemar the Young, and shortly after he was elected co-king of Denmark at Viborg landsting, a practice originally practised by the French Capetian dynasty and later in many of European monarchies. Valdemar's Duchy of Schleswig passed to his younger brother Eric.

During a great feast in Schleswig in the summer of 1218, with 15 bishops and 3 dukes present, Valdemar was anointed and crowned junior King of Denmark. He took part with his father in the unlucky hunt on the island of Lyø in 1223, where both kings were taken prisoner by Henry I, Count of Schwerin and Valdemar was imprisoned until the Easter of 1226. Count Henry demanded that Denmark surrender the land conquered in Holstein 20 years ago and become a vassal of the Holy Roman Emperor for father and son to be released. Danish envoys refused these terms and Denmark declared war. While the kings were in prison, most of the German territories tore themselves away from Denmark. Danish armies were dispatched to hold them in line. The war ended in defeat of the Danish troops under the command of Albert of Orlamünde at Mölln in 1225. To secure their releases Valdemar II had to acknowledge the break away territories in Germany, pay 44,000 silver marks, sign a promise not to seek revenge on Count Henry and send his son Erik to prison instead.

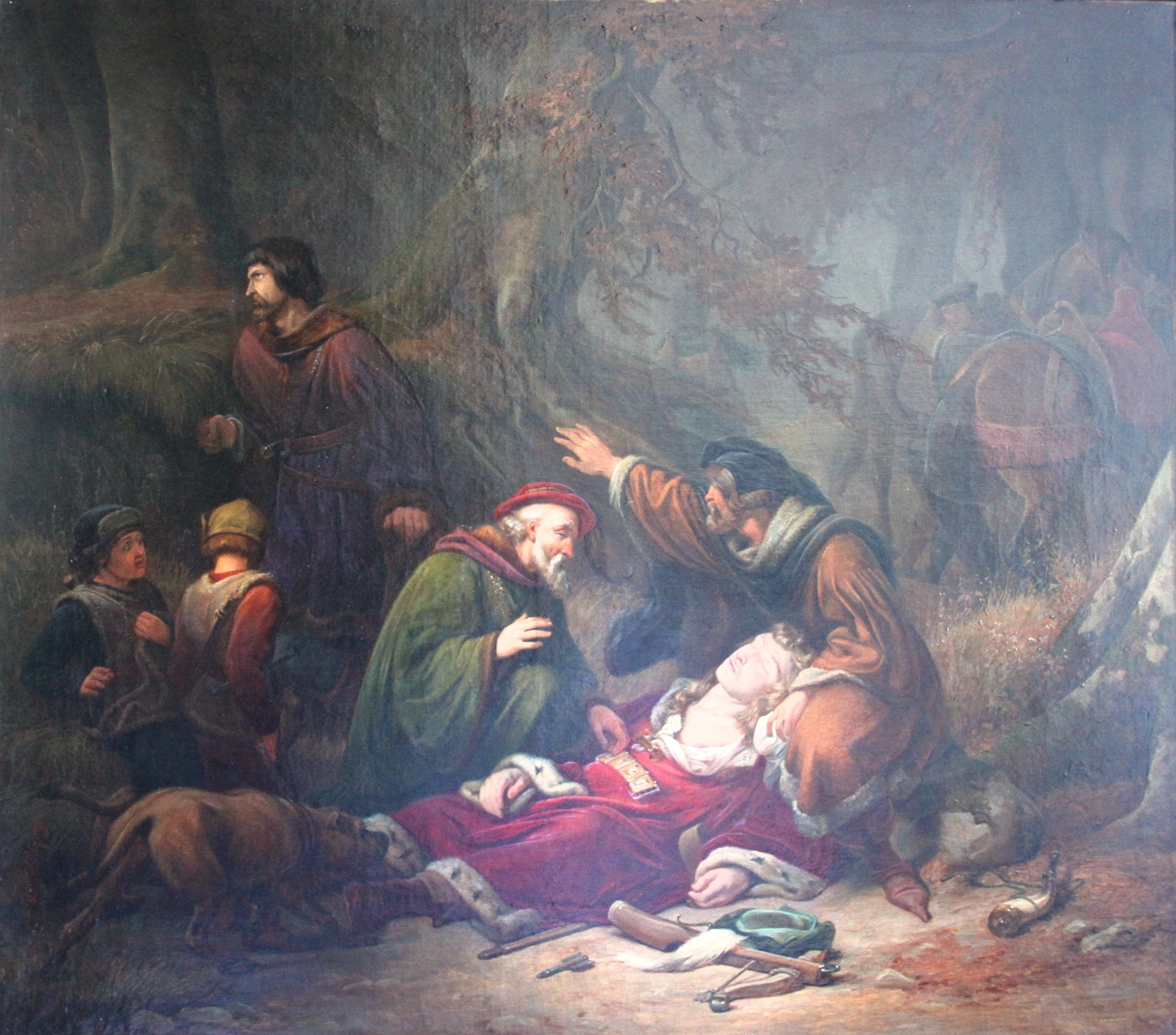
Death of Valdemar the Young, portrayed by the Danish painter Christian Emil Andersen, 1843.

On 24 June 1229, the young king married Eleanor of Portugal, daughter of Afonso II of Portugal, at Ribe. The match had been arranged by Bishop Gunner of Viborg who the couple loved like a father. They had been married for two years when Queen Eleanor died in childbirth on 28 August 1231. The child was short-lived.

On 28 November 1231, Valdemar the Young was accidentally shot by an arrow while hunting at Refsnæs, near Kalundborg. He died the same day. Valdemar was praised for his mildness and kindness towards everyone and was very popular; the Latin elegy, which a cleric authored, when the kings were captured, mentions him in the best words of praise. It was a tremendous grief to the country when he was killed. He was buried at St. Bendt's Church, Ringsted beside his wife, Queen Eleanor. His father then made his younger half-brother Eric co-king. King Valdemar II died ten years later and was succeeded by Eric.

Valdemar the Young House of Estridsen Born: circa 1209 Died: 28 November 1231
Regnal titles
| Preceded by Valdemar the Victorious as sole ruler | (Junior) King of Denmark; 1215–1231 with Valdemar the Victorious | Succeeded by Valdemar the Victorious as sole ruler |
| Preceded by Valdemar the Victorious as sole ruler | Duke of Schleswig; 1209–1216 with Valdemar the Victorious | Succeeded by Eric Ploughpenny |
