= Canute, Duke of Estonia =

Danish noble, Duke of Estonia

Canute or Knud Valdemarsen (1207 – 1260) was an illegitimate son of King Valdemar II of Denmark, who became Duke of Revelia, Blekinge and Lolland.

Canute was the son of the king by his mistress, Helena Guttormsdotter, widow of Danish nobleman Esbern Snare and daughter of Guttorm, Riksjarl of Sweden. His father gave him lands in Estonia as a hereditary duchy in 1219. He was made Duke of Reval (Tallinn) in 1219, but was dispossessed as Denmark was thrown out by the Livonian Brothers of the Sword in 1227. As compensation, he was given Blekinge in 1242, which he held until his death. Canute supported the younger rebel brothers, Abel and Christopher, against King Eric IV of Denmark in 1246, and was imprisoned at Stegeborg Castle. The king forced him to exchange Blekinge temporarily for Lolland, but Blekinge was soon restored to Canute's possession.

Canute left two sons, Erik (died 1304) and Svantepolk (died 1310), as well as a daughter who is said to have married a Folkung. Canute's land of Blekinge, with Lister, was given to his great-grandson lord Knut Folkason in the 1330s by King Magnus Eriksson of Sweden and Norway. Lord Knut's heirs continued to claim the lordship.

== Citations and references ==
=== Cited sources ===
- Line, Philip (2007). Kingship and State Formation in Sweden: 1130 - 1290. Brill.
- Skyum-Nielsen, Niels (1981). "Estonia under Danish Rule". In Skyum-Nielsen, Niels; Lund, Niels (eds.). Danish Medieval History: New Currents. Museum Tusculanum Press.

Canute, Duke of Estonia House of Estridsen Born: 1207
Danish royalty
Preceded by Creation of the Duchy	Duke of Estonia; 1220-1227	Succeeded by Occupation by the Teutonic Order
Preceded by Occupation by the Teutonic Order	Duke of Estonia; 1238-1240	Succeeded by Valdemar II of Denmark
