= Niels, Count of Halland =

Niels Valdemarsen, Count of Halland, Nikolaus, (died 1218) was Count of Halland from 1216 until his death in 1218. He was a natural son of King Valdemar II of Denmark by an unknown mistress.

In 1217, Niels married Oda of Schwerin, a daughter of Gunzelin I, Count of Schwerin. As a result of the marriage, half the county of Schwerin was pledged as security to Niels until her dowry could be paid.

He had a son Niels Nielsen Skarsholm af Halland (1215–1260) who married Cecilie Jensdatter Galen (1215–1260). They had a son Jacob Nielsen Skarsholm af Halland (1250–1308).

Niels died in 1218, his widow in 1220. They were survived by a son, Niels, Count of Northern Halland. Disputes over his claims to the German territories pledged to his father, led to the capture of his grandfather Valdemar II in 1223 by Henry, Count of Schwerin.

== Bibliography ==
- Johannes Steenstrup: "Niels, Greve af Halland", Dansk biografisk leksikon, XII. Bind. Münch-Peirup, 1898, p. 202.
