= St. Agnes' Priory, Roskilde =

St. Agnes' Priory (Sankt Agnetekloster) was a Danish convent for women of the Dominican Order. It was situated in Roskilde and was in operation from 1264 until the Danish Reformation.

== History ==
In 1264, St. Agnes' Priory was founded north of the city outside the walls. Princess Agnes of Denmark (1249–ca. 1288) served as its first prioress from 1264–1266. Her sister Jutta of Denmark (ca. 1246–1284) was prioress in 1266–1270. Princess Agnes and Jutta were both daughters of King Erik Plovpenning (ca. 1216–1250).

Both princesses were placed in the convent by Queen Margaret Sambiria (1230–1282) while she served as regent during the minority of her son, King Eric V of Denmark (1249–1286). The sisters brought with them their inheritance, including several large properties. The sisters disliked life as nuns and both left the convent in 1270. They retracted their property and afterwards the courts heard the complaints of the nuns' legal representatives. Finally, a court ruling in 1284 ordered the crown to hand over the inheritance to the sisters.

King Erik Menved donated a large property including a mill to the nuns in 1295. The monastery eventually acquired properties in numerous Zealand villages. St. Agnes' Priory became a rich institution with members normally from the highest Danish nobility. At its height there was room to house 30 nuns. The priory seemed to attract more financial support than the neighboring Dominican Monastery of St. Catherine's Priory, Roskilde. It eventually owned more than 70 farms in Zealand, which had been donated for maintenance and income. The priory also owned two bath houses in the town as additional income properties.

=== Dissolution ===
The Reformation brought the nunnery at Roskilde to an end. The properties of the nuns were confiscated as early as 1527. In 1536 Denmark became officially Lutheran, rejecting all Catholic institutions and most traditions. In 1572, St. Agnes' Priory and its holding came under the control of Tryggevælde.
