= Eric IV of Denmark =

Eric IV Ploughpenny
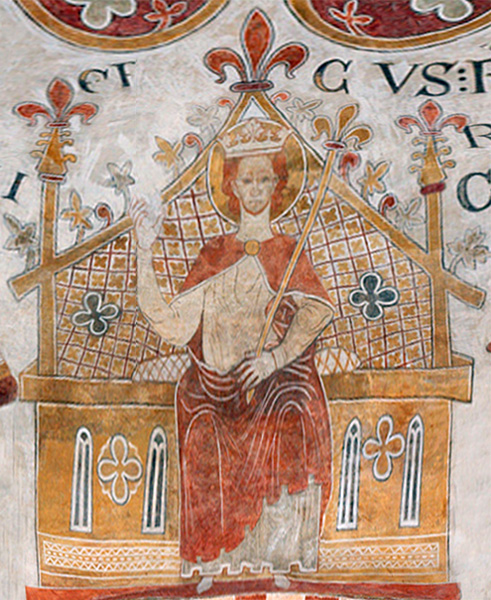
- Church fresco in St Bendt's Church, Ringsted.

King of Denmark and the Wends
- Co-reign Solo-reign: 1232–1241; 1241–1250
- Coronation: 30 May 1232
- Predecessor: Valdemar II the Victorious & Valdemar the Young
- Successor: Abel
- Senior king: Valdemar II
- Born: c. 1216
- Died: 10 August 1250 (aged 33–34) on the bay of the Schlei, near Gottorf Castle
- Burial: first at Schleswig Cathedral, then St. Bendt's Church
- Spouse: Jutta of Saxony
- Issue among others...: Sophia, Queen of Sweden; Ingeborg, Queen of Norway; Jutta, Abbess of St. Agneta; Agnes, Abbes of St. Agneta
Names
- Eric Valdemarsen
- House: Estridsen
- Father: Valdemar II of Denmark
- Mother: Berengaria of Portugal

Eric IV (c. 1216 – 10 August 1250), also known as Eric Ploughpenny or Eric Plowpenny (Danish: Erik Plovpenning), was King of Denmark from 1241 until his death in 1250. His reign was marked by conflict and civil wars against his brothers.

== Early life ==
Eric was the son of Valdemar II of Denmark and brother of King Abel of Denmark and King Christopher I of Denmark. He was born ca. 1216 as the second legitimate son of King Valdemar II by his second wife Berengária of Portugal.

In 1218, when his older half-brother Valdemar the Young was crowned king as their father's co-ruler and designated heir, he was created Duke of Schleswig. After the premature death of Valdemar in 1231, Eric was crowned king at Lund Cathedral 30 May 1232 as his father's co-ruler and heir. Subsequently, he ceded the Duchy of Schleswig to his younger brother Abel. When his father died in 1241, he ascended to the throne.

== Rule ==
His rule was marked by bitter conflicts, especially against his brother, Duke Abel of Schleswig who seems to have wanted an independent position and who was supported by the counts of Holstein. Eric also fought the Scanian peasants, who rebelled because of his hard taxes on ploughs, among other things. The number of ploughs a man owned was used as a measure of his wealth. This gave the king the epithet "plough-penny" (Danish: Plovpenning).

Eric had only been king for about a year when he first came into conflict with his brother, Duke Abel of Schleswig, in 1242. The conflict lasted for three years before the brothers agreed on a truce in 1244 and made plans for a joint crusade to Estonia. At the same time Eric faced trouble from the religious orders who insisted that they were immune from taxes that Eric might assess. Eric wanted the church lands taxed as any other land holder would be. The Pope sent a nuncio to negotiate between the king and the bishops at Odense in 1245. Excommunication was threatened for anyone, great or small who trespassed upon the ancient rights and privileges of the church. It was a clear warning to Eric that the church would not tolerate his continued insistence at assessing church property for tax purposes.

Infuriated, in 1249 King Eric directed his rage at Niels Stigsen, Bishop of the Diocese of Roskilde who fled Denmark the same year. Eric confiscated the bishopric's properties in Zealand, including the emerging city of Copenhagen. In spite of intervention from Pope Innocent IV who advocated the reinstatement of the bishop and the return of the properties to the diocese, the dispute could not be resolved. Niels Stigsen died in 1249 at Clairvaux Abbey. The properties were not restored to the diocese until after the death of King Eric in 1250.

The conflict between King Eric and his brothers had broken out again in 1246. The conflict started when Eric invaded Holstein in an attempt to restore his father's control of the county. Duke Abel of Schleswig, married to a daughter of Adolf IV, Count of Holstein and former guardian of his brothers-in-law, the two young counts of Holstein John I and Gerhard I, forced King Eric to abandon his conquest. The following year, Abel and the Holsteiners stormed into Jutland and Funen, burning and pillaging as far north as Randers and Odense. Abel was supported by the Hanseatic League city of Lübeck, as well as by his brothers Christopher, Lord of Lolland and Falster and Canute, Duke of Blekinge.

King Eric retaliated immediately, reconquering the city of Ribe and occupying Abel's patrimonial city of Svendborg the same year. In 1247, he captured Arreskov Castle (Arreskov Slot) on Funen, as well as taking Christopher and Canute prisoners. A truce was arranged by Eric's sister Sophie of Denmark (ca 1217–1247) who was the wife of Johann I, Margrave of Brandenburg (c. 1213–1266). The terms of the accord left Eric in firm control of all of Denmark. In 1249 the peasants in Scania rose in rebellion against the plough tax. The king restored order with help from Zealand, but the church, Duke Abel, and the German counts in southern Jutland were pushed into an erstwhile alliance against the king.

== Regicide ==
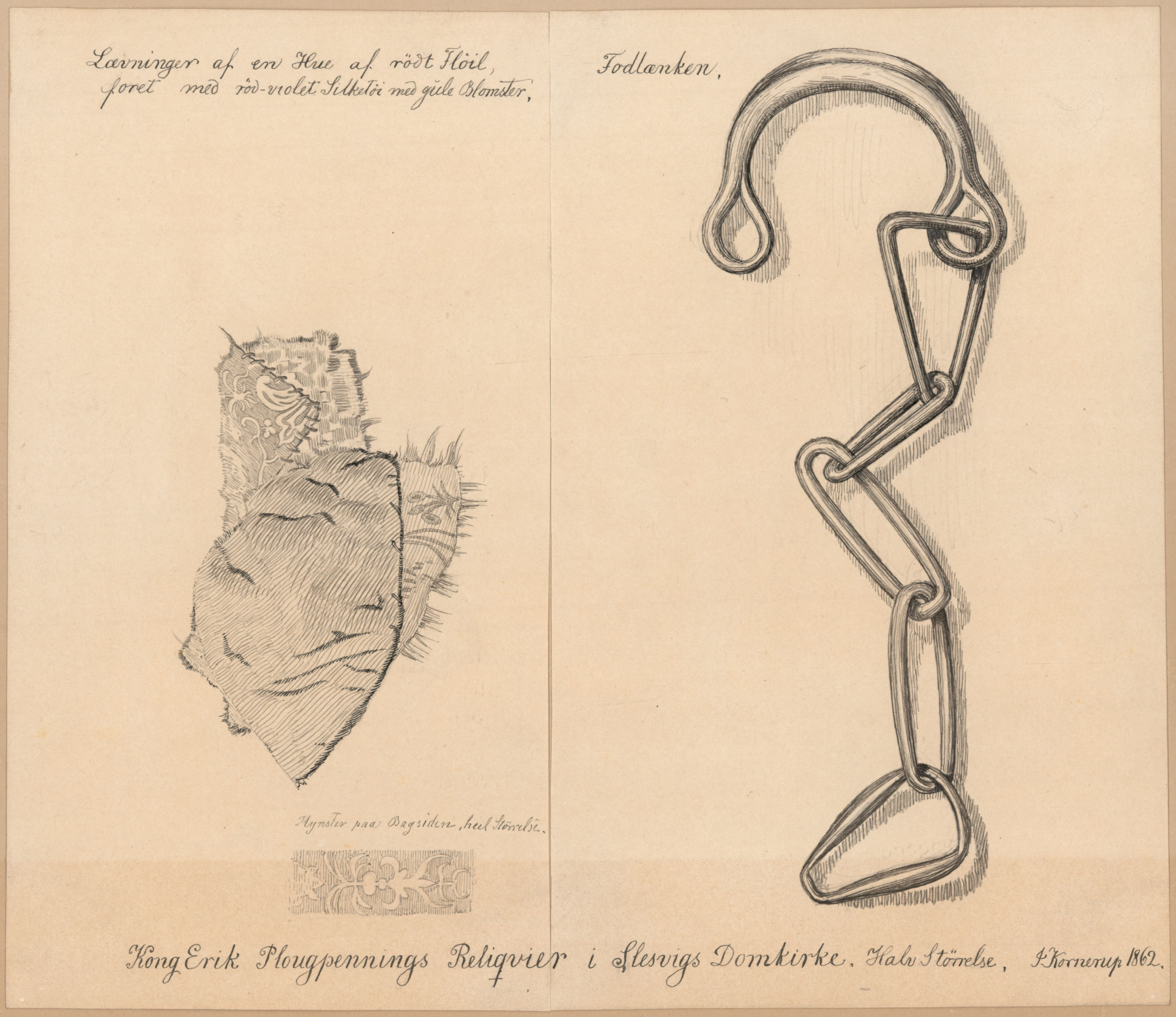
Eric Plovpenning's relics in Schleswig Cathedral.

Erik raised an army and sailed to Estonia to secure his base there in 1249. On his way home in 1250 he took his army to Holstein to prevent the capture of the border fortress of Rendsburg and to teach the German counts who was still king. His brother, Duke Abel of Schleswig offered him hospitality at his house at Gottorp in Schleswig. That evening as the king gambled with one of the German knights, the duke's chamberlain and a group of other men rushed in and took the king prisoner. They bound him and dragged him out of the duke's house and down to a boat and rowed out into the Schlien. They were followed out onto the water by a second boat. When King Erik heard the voice of his sworn enemy, Lave Gudmundsen (ca. 1195–1252), he realized he was to be killed. One of the captors was paid to deliver the king's death blow with an ax. Erik was beheaded and his body dumped into the Schlien. The next morning two fishermen dragged the king's headless body up in their net. They carried the body to the Dominican Abbey in Schleswig; his body was later transferred to St. Bendt's Church, Ringsted in 1257.

Eric's brother Abel was sworn in as the successor king. Abel contended he had nothing to do with the murder. Within a year and a half, Abel himself was killed. He was succeeded as king of Denmark by his younger brother Christopher.

== Marriage and issue ==
Eric was married on 17 November 1239 with Jutta of Saxony daughter of Albert I, Duke of Saxony (c. 1175–1260). They were the parents of:

- Canute, died young.
- Christopher, died young.
- Sophia (1241–1286), married to King Valdemar of Sweden. Their descendants included Christian I of Denmark.
- Ingeborg (1244–1287), married to King Magnus VI of Norway.
- Jutta (1246–1284), Abbess of St. Agnes' Priory, Roskilde.
- Agnes (1249–1288/95), Abbess of St. Agnes' Priory, Roskilde; reputedly married to Eric Longbone, Lord of Langeland.

== Other sources ==
- Line, Philip (2007). Kingship and State Formation in Sweden: 1130 - 1290. (Brill Publishers). ISBN 978-90-47-41983-9
- Bain, Robert Nisbet (1905) Scandinavia: A Political History of Denmark, Norway and Sweden from 1513 to 1900 (Cambridge: University Press)

Eric IV of Denmark House of Estridsen Born: 1216 Died: 10 August 1250
Regnal titles
Preceded by Valdemar II as sole king	King of Denmark; Duke of Estonia; 1232–1250 with Valdemar II (1232–1241)	Succeeded by Abel
Preceded by Valdemar II as sole king	Duke of Schleswig; 1216–1232	Succeeded by Abel
