= Ingeborg of Denmark, Queen of Norway =

Queen of Norway from 1263 to 1280

Ingeborg Eriksdatter of Denmark

Queen consort of Norway
- Tenure: 1263–1280
- Coronation: 11 September 1261
- Born: c. 1244; Denmark
- Died: 24/26 March 1287 (aged 42–43)
- Spouse: Magnus VI of Norway (m. 1261; died 1280)
- Issue: Olaf; Magnus; Eric II of Norway; Haakon V of Norway
- House: Estridsen
- Father: Eric IV of Denmark
- Mother: Jutta of Saxony

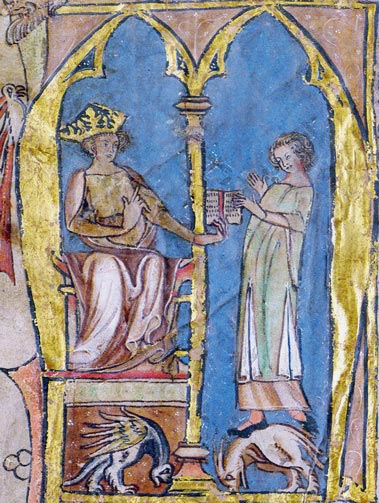
Magnus VI of Norway giving the national law to a lawman, from the Codex Hardenbergianus, relevant to Ingeborg of Denmark, Queen of Norway

Ingeborg Eriksdotter (c. 1244 – 24/26 March 1287) was Queen of Norway and the wife of King Magnus VI. She was born a Danish princess, daughter of Eric IV of Denmark. As queen dowager, she played an important part in politics during the minority of her son King Eirik II of Norway in 1280-82.

== Biography ==
Ingeborg was born to Eric IV of Denmark and Jutta of Saxony.

On 11 September 1261, she married Magnus in Bergen. Magnus and Ingeborg were crowned directly after their marriage, and Magnus was given the district of Ryfylke for his personal upkeep. The marriage was described as happy.

On 16 December 1263 King Haakon IV of Norway died while fighting the Scottish king over the Hebrides, and Magnus became the ruler of Norway. Ingeborg is not known to have played any part in politics as queen. Her two older sons, Olaf (1262 – 15 March 1267) and Magnus (b. and d. 1264), died in infancy, but the youngest two would later become Kings of Norway: Eric II (1268 – 13 July 1299) and Haakon V (ca. 10 April 1270 – 8 May 1319).

In 1280, she became a widow. Ingeborg was an important figure in the leadership of the country during the minority of King Eirik, though she was not formally named regent. Her influence grew after her son was declared adult in 1283. Her principal ally was Alv Erlingsson.

During the reign of her cousin King Eric V of Denmark, Ingeborg begun a feud regarding her inheritance, which she had never received. This largely private feud caused hostility between Norway and the German Hanseatic cities and a tense relationship with Denmark. Several Danish nobles, including Count Jacob of Halland, took her side against the Danish monarch, but she died before the affair was finished.

== Other sources ==
- Koht, Halvdan Norske dronningar (1926)

Norwegian royalty
Preceded by Rikissa Birgersdotter	Queen consort of Norway; 1263–1280	Succeeded by Margaret of Scotland
