= Valdemar II of Denmark =

King of Denmark from 1202 to 1241

Valdemar II
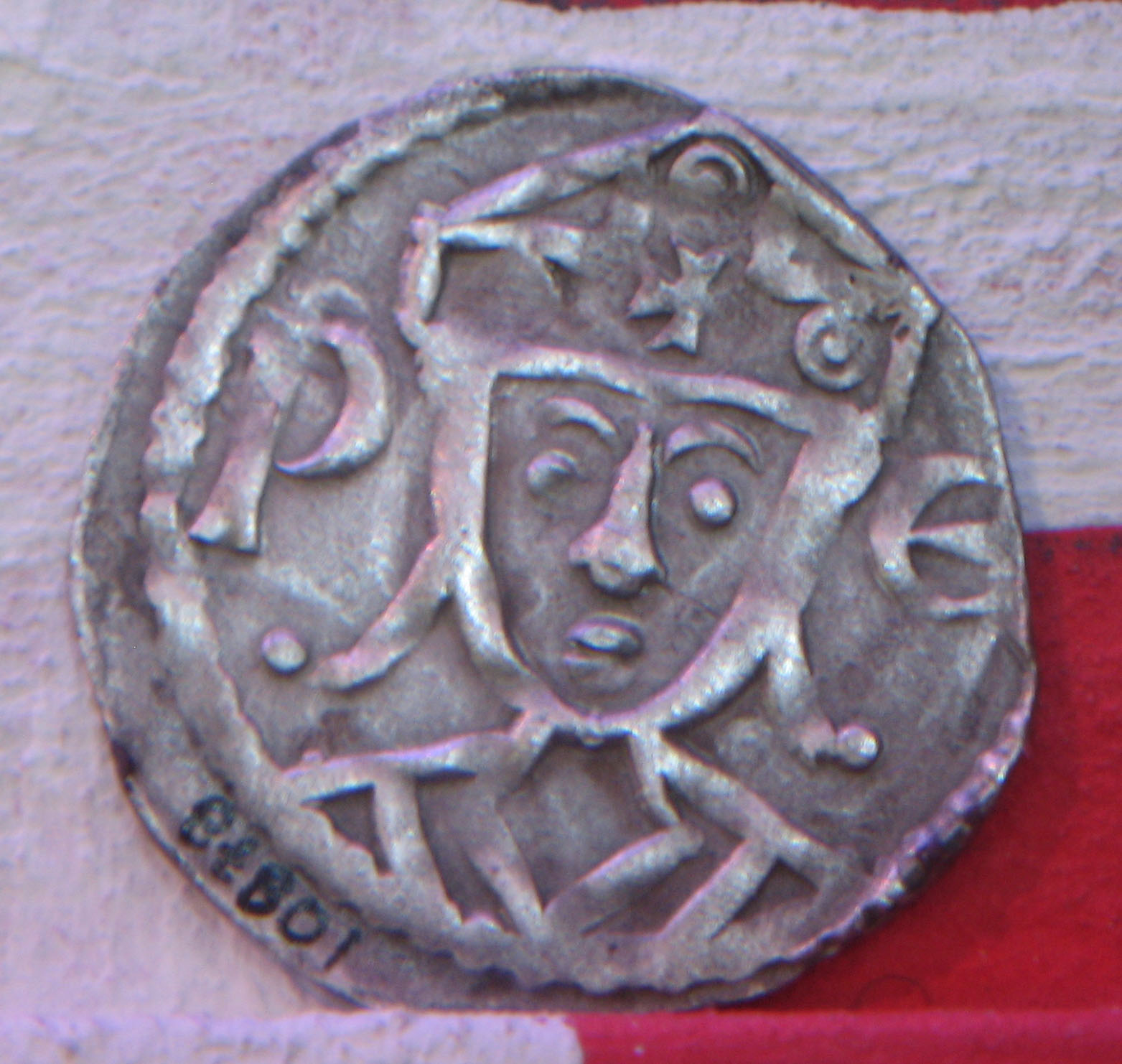
- Coin minted for King Valdemar II, Lund University History Museum

King of Denmark and the Wends
- Reign: 1202–1241
- Predecessor: Canute VI
- Successor: Eric IV
- Junior kings: Valdemar the Young, 1218–31; Eric IV, 1231–41
- Born: 28 June 1170; Ribe, Denmark
- Died: 28 March 1241 (aged 70); Vordingborg Castle, Vordingborg, Denmark
- Burial: St. Bendt's Church, Ringsted, Denmark
- Spouses: Dagmar of Bohemia; Berengaria of Portugal
- Issue among others...: Valdemar the Young; Eric IV, King of Denmark; Sophie, Margravine of Brandenburg; Abel, King of Denmark; Christopher I, King of Denmark; Illegitimate: Niels, Count of Halland; Canute, Duke of Estonia
Names
- Valdemar Valdemarsen
- House: Estridsen
- Father: Valdemar I of Denmark
- Mother: Sophia of Minsk

Valdemar II Valdemarsen (28 June 1170 – 28 March 1241), later remembered as Valdemar the Victorious (Danish: Valdemar Sejr) and Valdemar the Conqueror, was King of Denmark from 1202 until his death in 1241.

In 1207, Valdemar invaded and conquered Lybeck and Holstein, expanding the Danish territories. His involvement in the Norwegian succession led to the second Bagler War, temporarily settling the issue and making the Norwegian king owe allegiance to Denmark. He faced disputes with the papacy over the appointment of the Prince-Archbishop of Bremen and the Bishop of Schleswig. Valdemar's military campaigns included conflicts in northern Germany and the establishment of Danish rule in Estonia in 1219. His reign saw the adoption of a feudal system in Denmark and the creation of the Code of Jutland, which served as Denmark's legal code until 1683.

== Background ==
He was the second son of King Valdemar I of Denmark and Sophia of Polotsk. When his father died, young Valdemar was only 12 years old. He was named duke of Southern Jutland (Latin: dux slesvicensis.) His regent was Bishop Valdemar Knudsen, the illegitimate son of King Canute V of Denmark. Bishop Valdemar was an ambitious man and disguised his own ambitions as young Valdemar's. When Bishop Valdemar was named archbishop of Bremen in 1192, his plot to overthrow King Canute VI of Denmark (elder brother of Duke Valdemar) with the help of the German nobility and place himself on Denmark's throne was revealed.

Duke Valdemar realized the threat Bishop Valdemar represented. He thus invited him to Aabenraa in 1192. The bishop then fled to Norway to avoid arrest. The following year, Bishop Valdemar organised – supported by the Hohenstaufens – a fleet of 35 ships and harried the coasts of Denmark, claiming the Danish throne for himself based on the fact that he was the son of King Canute V. In 1193, King Canute VI captured him. Bishop Valdemar stayed in captivity in Nordborg (1193–1198) and then in the tower at Søborg Castle on Zealand until 1206. He was later released upon the initiative of Dagmar of Bohemia (the wife of Duke Valdemar) and Pope Innocent III after swearing to never interfere again in Danish affairs.

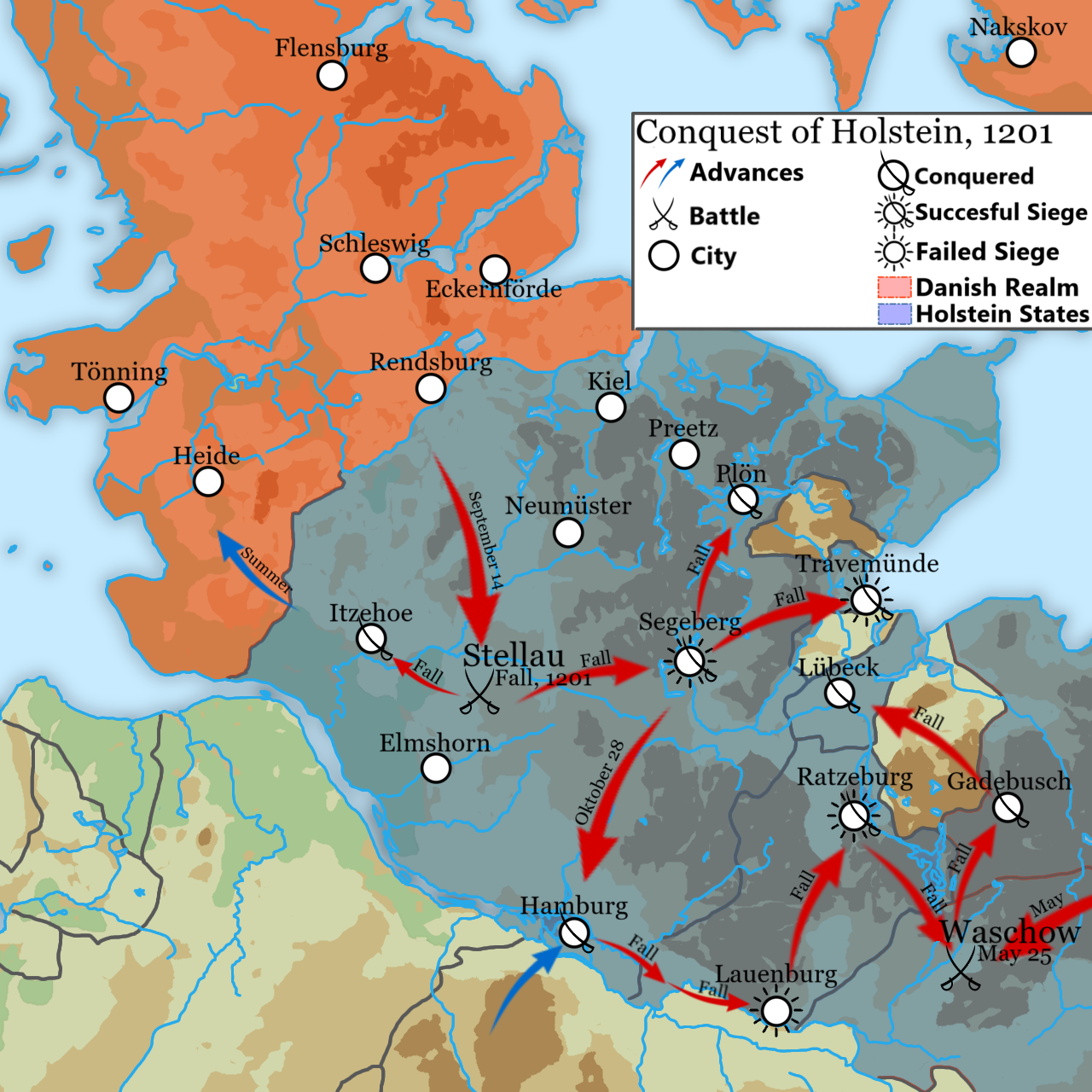
Valdemar's Campaigns in Holstein (1201)

Young Valdemar faced another threat from Count Adolf III of Holstein. Adolf tried to stir up other German counts to take southern Jutland from Denmark, and to assist Bishop Valdemar's plot to take the Danish throne. With the bishop again in prison, Duke Valdemar went after Count Adolph, and with his own troop levies, he marched south and captured Adolph's new fortress at Rendsburg. He defeated and captured the count at the Battle of Stellau in 1201, and imprisoned him in a cell next to Bishop Valdemar. Two years later, due to an illness, Count Adolph was able to buy his way out of prison by ceding all of Schleswig, north of the Elbe, to Duke Valdemar. In November 1202, Duke Valdemar's elder brother, King Canute VI, unexpectedly died childless.

== Reign ==
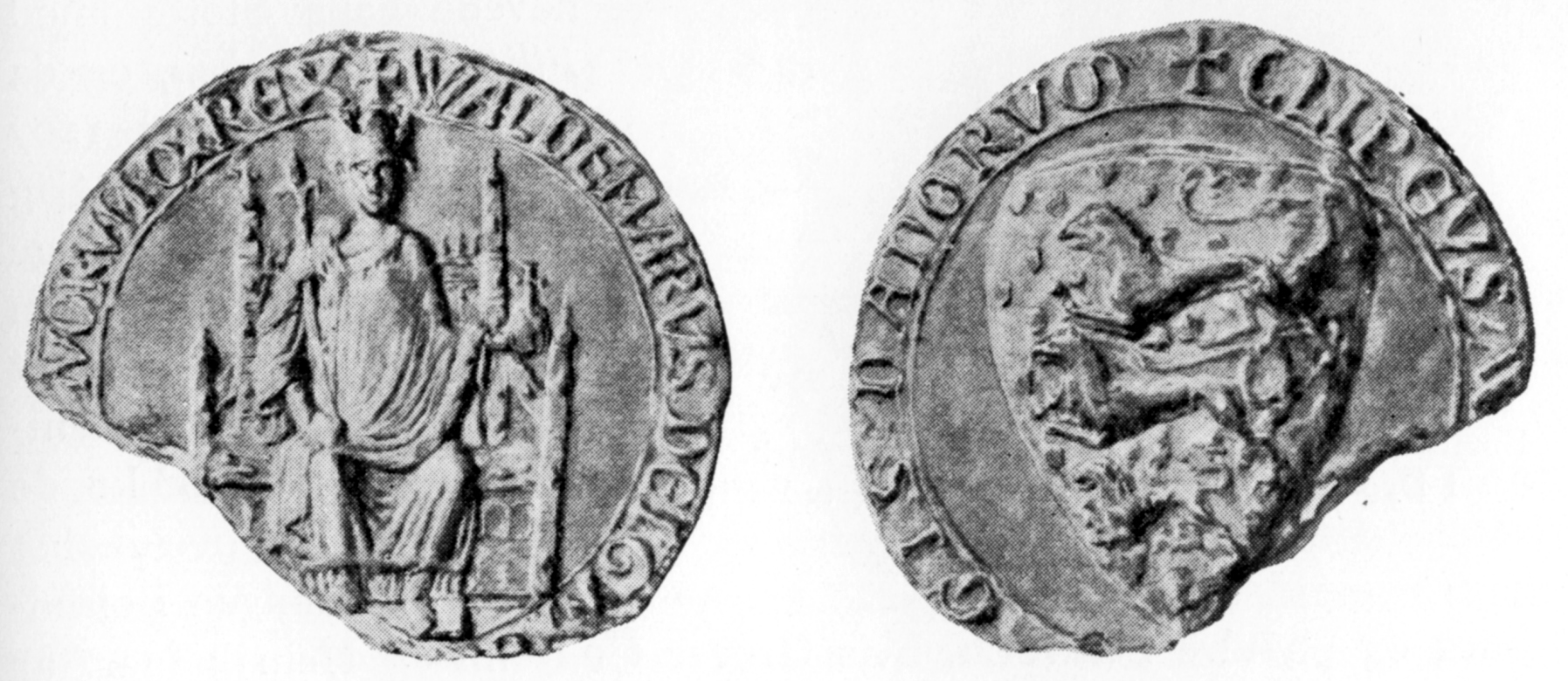
The Seal of Valdemar II

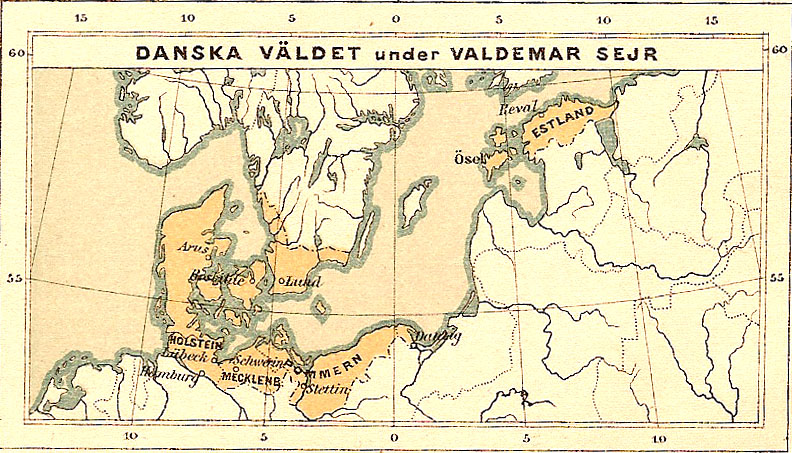
Danish realm under King Valdemar II

Scandinavia in 1219.

Duke Valdemar was subsequently proclaimed king at the Jutland Assembly (landsting). The nearby Holy Roman Empire was torn by civil war due to having two rivals contesting for its throne, Otto IV, House of Guelf, and King Philip, House of Hohenstaufen. Valdemar II allied himself with Otto IV against Phillip.

In 1203 Valdemar invaded and conquered Lybeck and Holstein, adding them to the territories controlled by Denmark. In 1204 he attempted to influence the outcome of the Norwegian succession by leading a Danish fleet and army to Viken in Norway in support of Erling Steinvegg, the pretender to the Norwegian throne. This resulted in the second Bagler War which lasted until 1208. The question of the Norwegian succession was temporarily settled and the Norwegian king owed allegiance to the king of Denmark.

In 1207, a majority of Bremian capitulars again elected Bishop Valdemar as prince-archbishop, while a minority, led by the capitular provost Burkhard, Count of Stumpenhausen fled for Hamburg, being the seat of a Bremian subchapter with regional competence and delegating for episcopal elections two participants to the main Bremian chapter. The German King Philip recognised Valdemar as the legitimate prince-archbishop of Bremen, because thus the prince-archbishopric would become his ally against Valdemar II.

Valdemar II and the fled capitulars protested to Pope Innocent III, who first wanted to research the case. When Bishop Valdemar left Rome for Bremen against Pope Innocent's order to wait his decision, he banished Valdemar by an anathema and in 1208 finally dismissed him as Bishop of Schleswig. In 1208, Burkhard, Count of Stumpenhausen, was elected by the fled capitulars in Hamburg as rival prince-archbishop and Valdemar II, usurping imperial power, invested Burkhard with the regalia – with effect only in the prince-archiepiscopal and diocesan territory north of the Elbe. In 1209 Innocent III finally consented the consecration of Bishop Nicholas I of Schleswig, a close confidant and consultant of King Valdemar, as successor of the deposed Bishop Valdemar. In 1214 King Valdemar appointed Bishop Nicholas I as Chancellor of Denmark, succeeding the late Peder Sunesen, Bishop of Roskilde.

In the same year Valdemar II invaded with Danish troops the prince-archiepiscopal territory south of the Elbe and conquered Stade. In August Prince-Archbishop Valdemar reconquered the city only to lose it soon after again to Valdemar II, who now built a bridge of the Elbe and fortified a forward post in Harburg upon Elbe. In 1209 Otto IV persuaded Valdemar II to withdraw into the north of the Elbe, urged Burkhard to resign and expelled Prince-Archbishop Valdemar.

In 1210, Innocent III made Gerhard I, Count of Oldenburg-Wildeshausen Bremen's new Prince-Archbishop. In 1211 Duke Bernard III of the younger Duchy of Saxony escorted his brother-in-law Valdemar, the papally dismissed Prince-Archbishop, into the city of Bremen, de facto regaining the See and enjoying the sudden support of Otto IV, who meanwhile fell out with Innocent over Sicily. As a reaction Valdemar II recaptured Stade, while in 1213 Henry V, Count Palatine of the Rhine, conquered it for Prince-Archbishop Valdemar.

In 1213 Valdemar instituted a war tax in Norway, and the peasants murdered Valdemar's tax collector at the Trøndelag Assembly and revolted. The uprising spread over several regions in Norway.

In 1216, Valdemar II and his Danish troops ravaged the County of Stade and conquered Hamburg. Two years later Valdemar II and Gerhard I allied to expel Henry V and Otto IV from the Prince-Archbishopric. Prince-Archbishop Valdemar finally resigned and entered into a monastery. Valdemar supported Emperor Frederick II and was rewarded with the emperor acknowledging Denmark rule of Schleswig and Holstein, all of the Wendish lands and Pomerania.

=== Battle of Lindanise ===
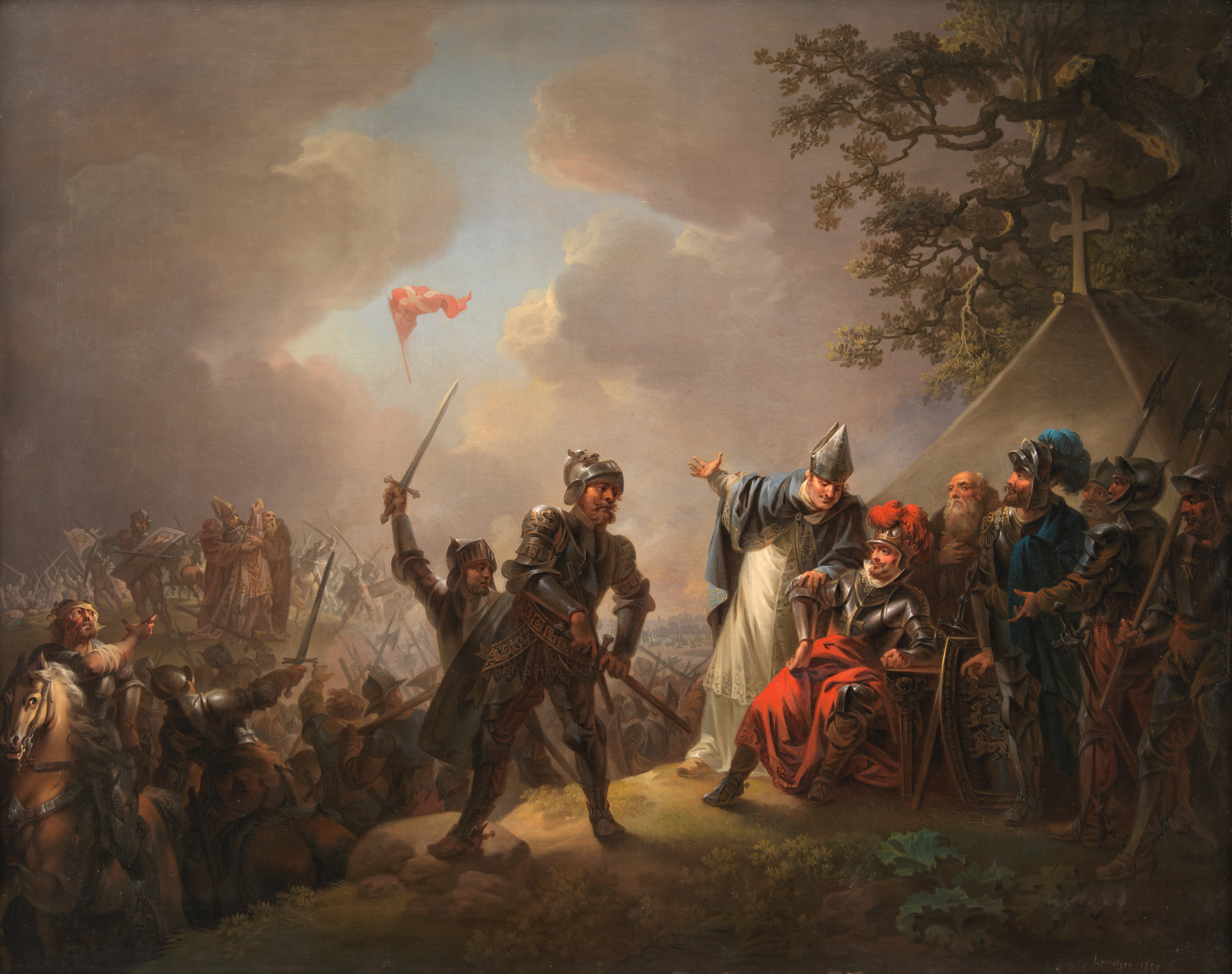
Dannebrog falling from the sky during the Battle of Lindanise Christian August Lorentzen (1809)

The Livonian Knights, who had been attempting to Christianize the peoples of the eastern Baltic, were (by 1219) being hard pressed and turned to Valdemar for help. Pope Honorius III elevated Valdemar's invasion of Estonia into a crusade. Valdemar raised an army and called all of Denmark's ships to gather to transport the army eastward. Once assembled, the fleet numbered 1500 ships.

When the army landed in Estonia, near modern-day Tallinn, the chiefs of the Estonians sat down with the Danes and agreed to acknowledge the Danish king as their overlord. A few of them allowed themselves to be baptized which seemed to be a good sign. Three days later on 15 June 1219 while the Danes were attending mass, thousands of Estonians broke into the Danish camp from all sides. Confusion reigned and things looked bad for Valdemar's crusade. Luckily for him, Vitslav of Rügen gathered his men in a second camp and attacked the Estonians from the rear.

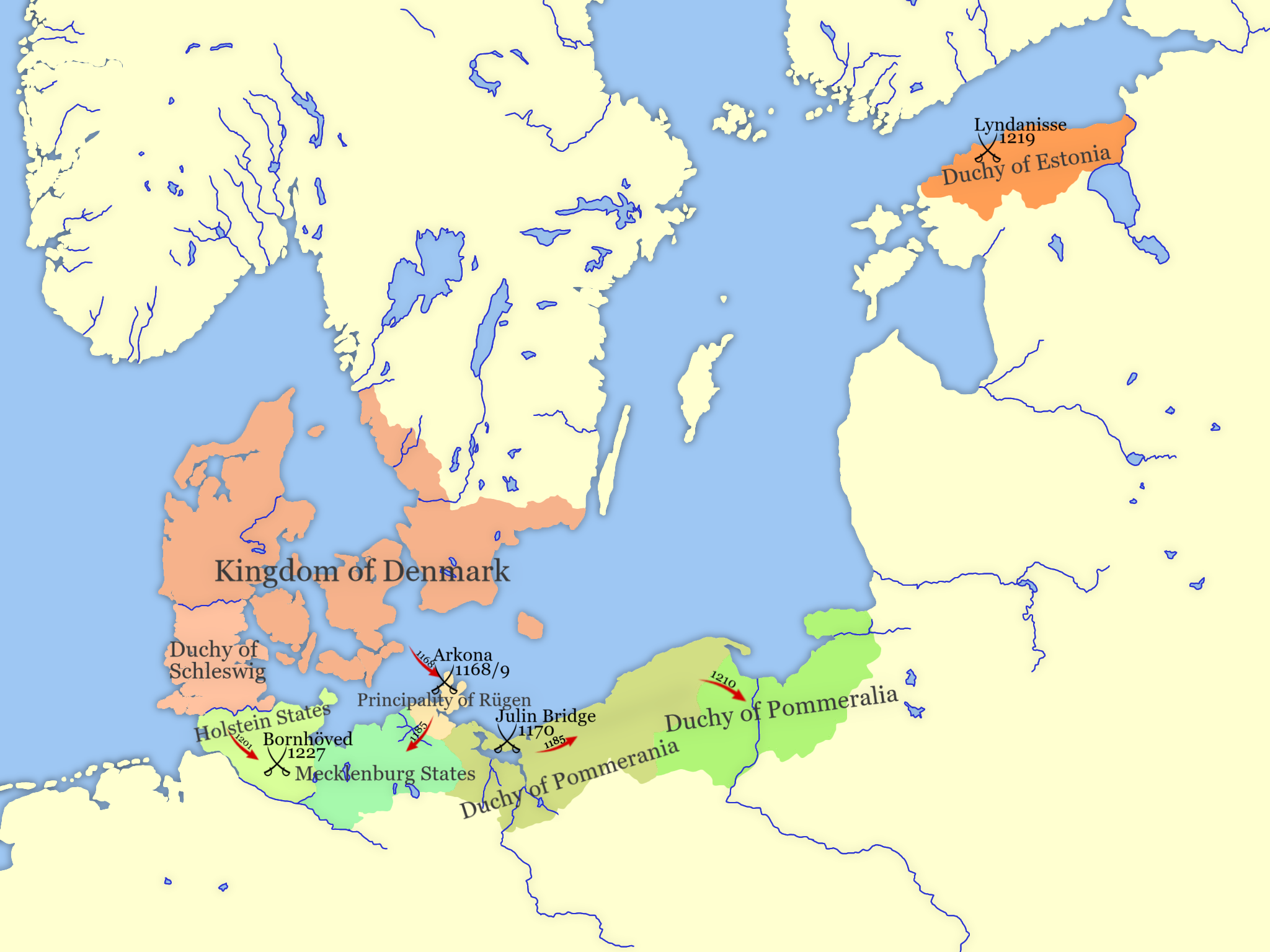
Peak of Valdemar's realm ca. 1220

During the Battle of Lindanise, the legend says that whenever Bishop Sunesen raised his arms the Danes surged forward and when his arms grew tired and he let them fall the Estonians turned the Danes back. Attendants rushed forward to raise his arms once again and the Danes surged forward again. At the height of the battle Bishop Sunsen prayed for a sign and it came in the form of a red cloth with a white cross which drifted down from the sky just as the Danes began to fall back. A voice was heard to say "When this banner is raised on high, you shall be victorious!" The Danes surged forward and won the battle. At the end of the day thousands of Estonians lay dead on the field, and Estonia was added to the Danish realm. Estonians were forcibly baptised as Christians, but according to an in depth study of the Liber Census Daniæ by the historian Edgar Sachs, the Estonians quite voluntarily converted to the Christian faith.

Valdemar ordered the construction of a great fortress at Reval, near the site of the battle. Eventually a city grew around the hilltop castle which is still called Tallinn, "Danish-castle/town" in the Estonian language. The red banner with a white cross (Dannebrog) has been the national flag of the Danes since 1219. Dannebrog is Europe's oldest flag design still in modern use.

=== Battle of Bornhöved ===
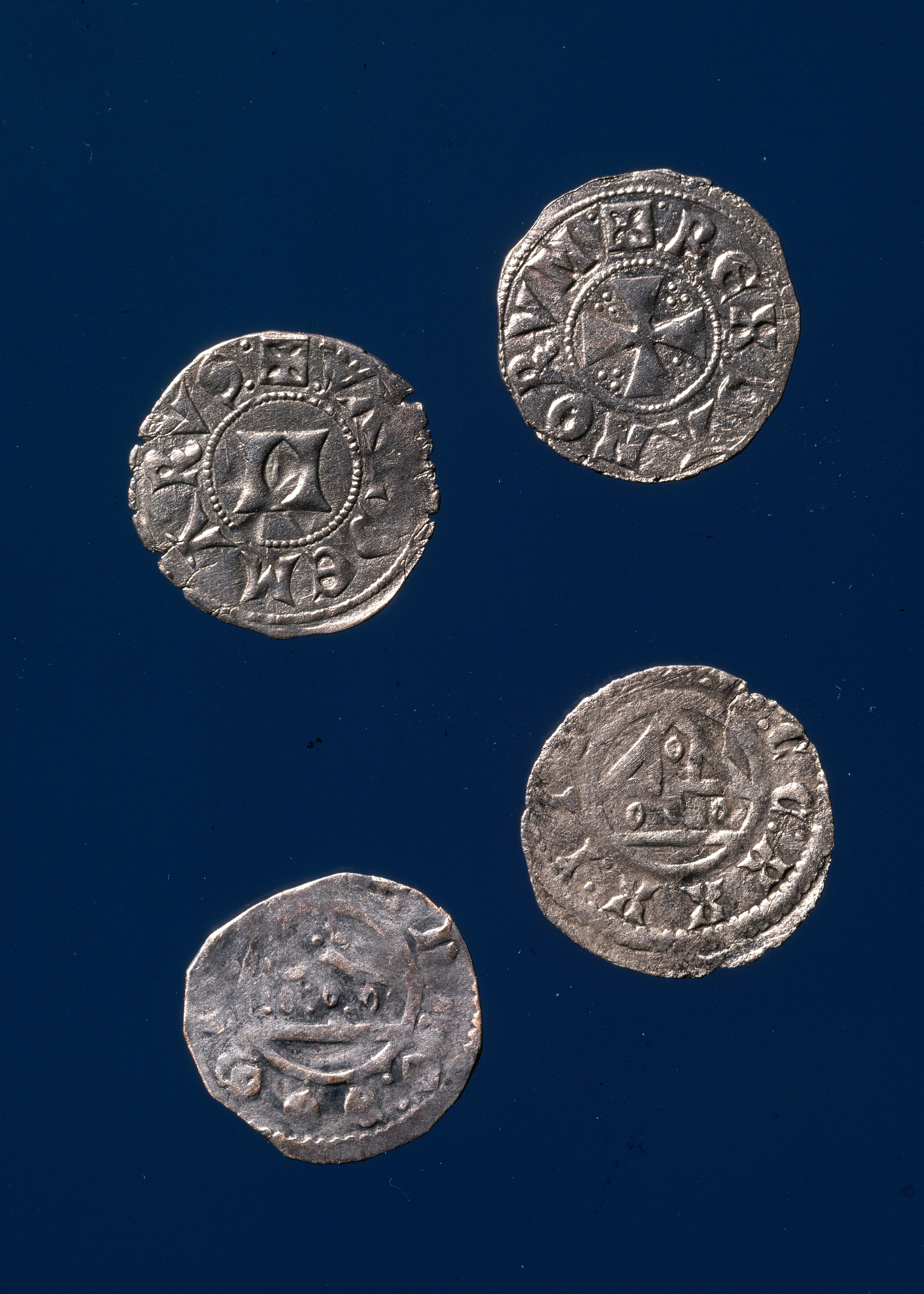
Coins minted during the reigh of Valdemar II.

In 1223, King Valdemar and his eldest son, prince Valdemar, were abducted by Count Henry I of Schwerin (Heinrich der Schwarze), while hunting on the island of Lyø near Funen. Count Henry demanded that Denmark surrender the land conquered in Holstein 20 years ago and become a vassal of the Holy Roman Emperor. Danish envoys refused these terms and Denmark declared war. While Valdemar sat in prison, most of the German territories tore themselves away from Denmark. Danish armies were dispatched to hold them in line. The war ended in defeat of the Danish troops under the command of Albert II of Orlamünde at Mölln in 1225. To secure his release Valdemar had to acknowledge the break away territories in Germany, pay 44,000 silver marks, and sign a promise not to seek revenge on Count Henry.

Valdemar immediately appealed to Pope Honorius III to have his oath declared void, a request granted by the Pope. Honorius III excused Valdemar from his forced oath, and he immediately set about trying to restore the German territories. Valdemar concluded a treaty with his nephew Otto I, Duke of Brunswick-Lüneburg and headed south to take back what he thought were his lands by right, but his luck deserted him. A series of Danish defeats culminating in the Battle of Bornhöved on 22 July 1227 cemented the loss of Denmark's north German territories. Valdemar himself was saved only by the chivalrous acts of a German knight who carried Valdemar to safety on his horse.

=== Code of Jutland ===
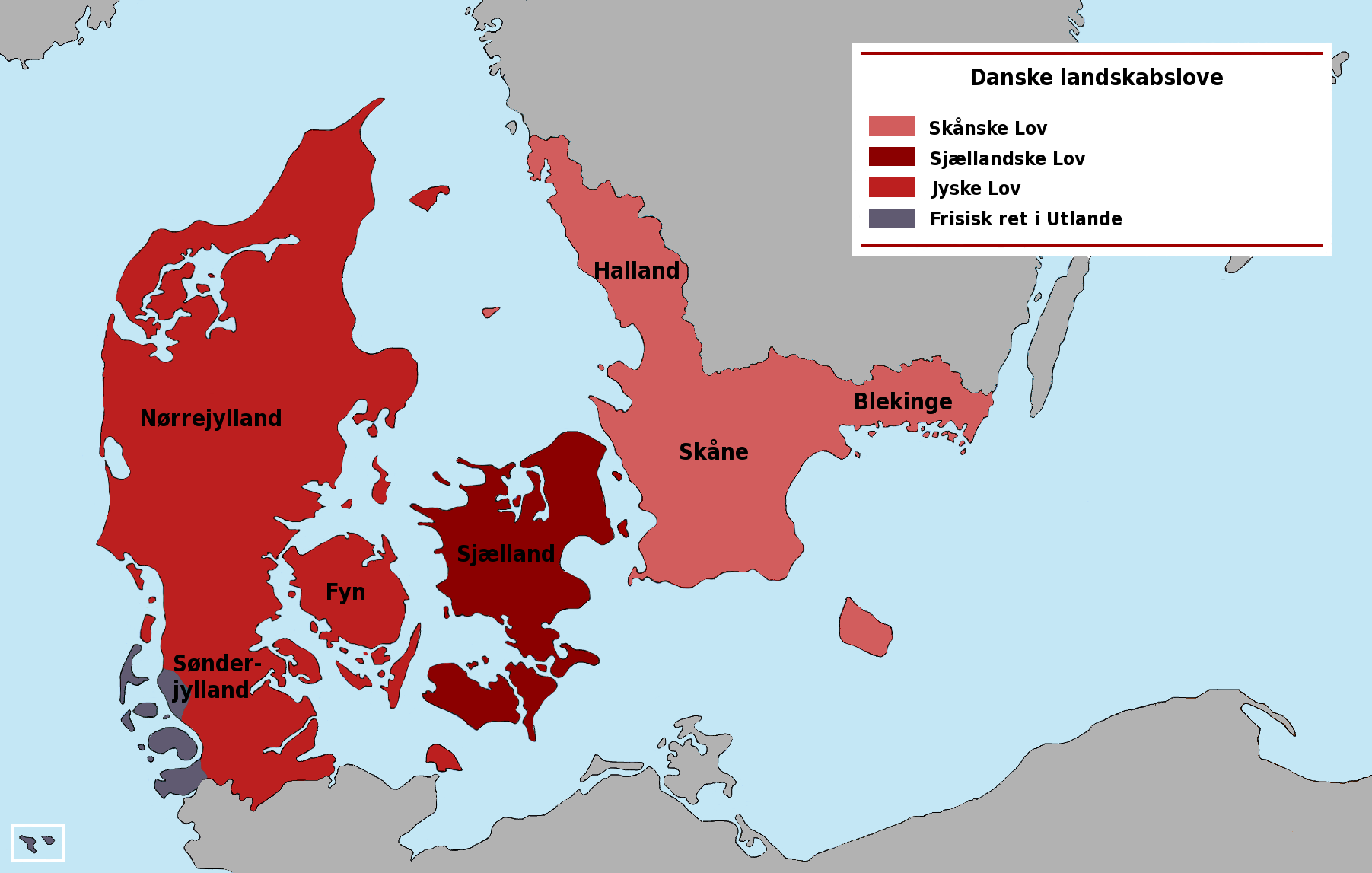
Prior to the adoption of the Danish Code, each landskab had its own legal code, except for the Uthlande (in purple) which followed Frisian Law.

From that time on, King Valdemar II focused his efforts on domestic affairs. One of the changes he instituted was the feudal system, where he gave properties to men with the understanding that they owed him service in return. This increased the power of the noble families (højadelen) and gave rise to the lesser nobles (lavadelen'), who controlled most of Denmark. Free peasants lost the traditional rights and privileges they had enjoyed since the Viking era.

King Valdemar II spent the remainder of his life putting together a code of laws for Jutland, Zealand, and Skåne. These codes were used as Denmark's legal code until 1683. This was a significant change from the local law-making at the regional assemblies (landting), which had been a long-standing tradition. Several methods of determining guilt or innocence were outlawed, including trial by ordeal and trial by combat. The Code of Jutland (Jyske Lov) was approved at the meeting of the nobility at Vordingborg Castle in 1241, just prior to Valdemar's death there. Valdemar was buried next to his first wife, Queen Dagmar, at Ringsted in Zealand.

== Marriages ==
Before his first marriage, Valdemar had been betrothed to Rixa of Bavaria, daughter of the Duke of Saxony. When that arrangement failed, he married first Dagmar of Bohemia, also known as Margaret of Bohemia, in 1205. She was the daughter of King Ottokar I of Bohemia by his first wife, Adelaide of Meissen, and soon became popular with the Danes. By this marriage, Valdemar had a son, Valdemar the Young, whom he elevated as co-king at Schleswig in 1218. Valdemar the Young was accidentally shot while hunting at Refsnæs in North Jutland in 1231. Queen Dagmar died in childbirth in 1212. Old folk ballads say that on her death bed, she begged Valdemar to marry Kirsten, the daughter of Karl von Rise, and not the "beautiful flower", Berengaria of Portugal (Bengjerd). In other words, she predicted Berengaria's sons' fight over the throne would bring trouble to Denmark.

After Dagmar's death, in order to build good relations with Flanders, Valdemar married Berengaria of Portugal in 1214. She was the orphan daughter of King Sancho I of Portugal and Dulce of Aragon, and a sister of Ferdinand, Count of Flanders, with whom she stayed until her marriage. Queen Berengaria was beautiful, but so hard-hearted that she was generally hated by the Danes until her early death, in childbirth, in 1221. Valdemar's two wives played a prominent role in Danish ballads and myths – Dagmar as the soft, pious, and popular ideal wife, and Berengaria as the beautiful and haughty woman.

=== Issue ===
With his first wife, Dagmar of Bohemia, whom he married in 1205, Valdemar had two sons:

- Valdemar the Young of Denmark (1209 – 28 November 1231), married Eleanor of Portugal.
- Stillborn son (1212)

With his second wife, Berengaria of Portugal, whom he married in 1214, he had five children:

- Eric IV, King of Denmark (1216 – 10 August 1250)
- Sophie of Denmark (1217–1247), married in 1230 to John I, Margrave of Brandenburg
- Abel, King of Denmark (1218 – 29 June 1252)
- Christopher I, King of Denmark (1219 – 29 May 1259)
- Stillborn child (1221)

== Legacy ==
Valdemar enjoys a central position in Danish history because of his position as "the king of Dannebrog" and as a legislator. To posterity, the civil wars and dissolution that followed his death made him appear to be the last king of a golden age. Since 1912, June 15 has officially been called Valdemarsdag (Valdemar's Day). The date now belongs to the group of 33 Danish annual Flag Days where Dannebrog is raised in celebration.

The 1997 film Eye of the Eagle was about a fictional story about Valdemar the Young. His father Valdemar was played by Lars Lohmann. The Estonian capital Tallinn has a park at Toompea called the Danish King's Garden where the Danish flag Dannebrog was born according to prevailing legends. Every year on 15 June, the Day of the Danish Flag is celebrated in the garden.

== Sources ==
- Line, Philip (2007). Kingship and State Formation in Sweden: 1130 – 1290. Brill.
- Hundahl, Kerstin (2014). "Placing Blame and Creating Legitimacy: The Implications of Rugish Involvement in the Struggle over the Succession amidst the Danish Church Strife c.1258–1260". In Hundahl, Kerstin; Kjær, Lars; Lund, Niels (eds.). Denmark and Europe in the Middle Ages, c.1000–1525: Essays in Honour of Professor Michael H. Gelting. Ashgate Publishing.
- Petersen, Leif Inge Ree (2010). "Battle of Bornhöved". In Rogers, Clifford J. (ed.). The Oxford Encyclopedia of Medieval Warfare and Military Technology. Vol. 1. Oxford University Press.
- Bregnsbo, Michael (2022). The Rise and Fall of the Danish Empire. p. 73.

Valdemar the Victorious House of Estridsen Born: 9 May 1170 Died: 28 March 1241
Regnal titles
Preceded by Canute VI	King of Denmark; 1202–1241 with Valdemar the Young (1218–1231); Eric Ploughpenny (1232–1241)	Succeeded by Eric Ploughpenny
Preceded by Christopher	Duke of Schleswig; 1183–1216 with Valdemar the Young (1209–1216)	Succeeded by Eric Ploughpenny
Preceded by Canute I	Duke of Estonia; 1240–1241	Succeeded by Eric Ploughpenny
