= Magnus Minniskiöld =

Swedish magnate

Magnus Minnesköld
- Noble family: Bjälbo
- Spouse: Ingrid Ylva
- Issue: Eskil Magnusson; Karl Magnusson; Bengt Magnusson; Birger Magnusson
- Father: Bengt Snivil

Magnus Minnesköld (also spelled Minniskiöld or Minnisköld; flourished c. 1200) was a Swedish magnate of the House of Bjälbo. He was the father of Eskil Magnusson, Karl Magnusson and Birger Jarl, through whom he became an ancestor of the later royal line of the House of Bjälbo. His date of death is uncertain; a Magnus recorded as having been killed at the Battle of Lena in 1208 has sometimes been identified with him, but the identification is not conclusive.

== Family ==
His earliest known ancestor is thought to be Folke the Fat, a powerful Swedish leader of the early 12th century, who married Ingegerd Knudsdatter, daughter of Canute the Saint of Denmark and Adela of Flanders, a descendant of Charlemagne. Ingegerd and her sister Cecilia both went to Sweden after the death of Adela and married there, and Folke and his kin were therefore close to the ruling elite of the Kingdom of Denmark.

A medieval Swedish genealogy states that "Folke the Fat was the father of Benedictus (Bengt) Snivil, and that Benedictus sired Jarl Birger, Jarl Charles, and Magnus who was called Minniskiöld". While his older brother Birger Brosa held the office of Riksjarl between 1174 and 1202, the younger Magnus lived at the family estate Bjälbo, in the current Mjölby municipality, Östergötland, Sweden. It has been assumed that he was the Lawspeaker of Östergötland, though this is not documented. He married the noblewoman Ingrid Ylva, of possible royal descent, and fathered several sons who would influence early Swedish history, most notably Birger Jarl. He is mentioned in two contemporary diplomas (DS 70, 116), as the brother of Birger Brosa, as well as by King Magnus Birgersson, who in a letter in 1280 called him "grandfather".

The cognomen of Magnus, Latinized as Mijneskiold, has been explained in various ways. It could derive from minni (memory), it may allude to his having a moon (måne) on his shield, or it could be interpreted as "smaller shield" (mindre sköld).

Magnus Minnesköld was probably married twice; this has been inferred from the great differences in the ages of his children. Nothing is known about his supposed first wife. Magnus married his second wife around 1195. This was Ingrid Ylva who, according to the Swedish reformer and historian Olaus Petri, was a daughter of Sune Sik. The same information is found in a medieval genealogy copied in the 16th century. Sune Sik, if he existed, was a younger son of King Sverker I of Sweden.

=== Children ===
Magnus had several known or probable children. Eskil Magnusson was considerably older than Birger Jarl, suggesting that they were half-brothers; Birger's mother was Ingrid Ylva.

By an unidentified first wife:

- Eskil Magnusson (died c. 1227), Lawspeaker of Västergötland. He married Kristina Nilsdotter, a granddaughter of Eric the Saint and widow of the Norwegian earl Håkon the Crazy.
- Possibly an unnamed daughter who married Sigtrygg Bengtsson (Boberg).

Of uncertain maternity:

- Karl Magnusson (died 1220), Bishop of Linköping and royal chancellor, killed at the Battle of Lihula in Estonia.
- Bengt Magnusson (died 4 January 1237), probably the Bengt who succeeded Karl as Bishop of Linköping.

By Ingrid Ylva:

- Birger Magnusson (died 1266), Jarl of Sweden and father of Kings Valdemar and Magnus III.

== Struggle for the crown ==
Judging from the properties of his descendants, Magnus Minniskiöld owned various lands in Östergötland, and is probably responsible for the construction of the church of Bjälbo. Although, as the younger brother of Birger Brosa, Magnus was not the head of the powerful family, his central position in the ruling elite suggests that he was actively involved in the fight between Sverker II of Sweden of the House of Sverker, and Erik Knutsson of the House of Eric, for the Swedish crown, which was contested over three main battles. The first was the Battle of Älgarås, (now a place in the Swedish community Töreboda in Västergötland) in November 1205, where King Sverker II defeated Erik Knutsson. The second one was the battle Battle of Lena (now Kungslena in Västergötland) on 31 January 1208, in which Erik Knutsson, with a Swedish (and Norwegian?) army, won a devastating victory over King Sverker II and his Danish army, drove him from the throne and placed himself in the throne as Erik X, King of Sweden from 1208 to 1216. The last was the Battle of Gestilren (perhaps in Enköping in Uppland) on July 17, 1210, in which the displaced King Sverker II, with a Danish army, attempted to regain his throne, but was defeated and died in the battle.

A medieval Liber Daticus (Book of Donations) from Lund states that an aristocrat called Magnus fell at the Battle of Lena ("II Kal. Februar. obiit Magnus, qui occisus est in Gocia apud Lene, Anno Dominice incarnationis MCCVIII"). The equation of this Magnus with Magnus Minniskiöld is not certain, however. The remains of his son Birger Jarl have been examined, and they indicate that he was 50–55 years old when he died, and Magnus was therefore probably still alive some years after the Lena battle.
