= Bengt Snivil =

Swedish magnate

- Noble family: Bjälbo
- Issue: Birger Brosa; Magnus Minnesköld; Karl the Deaf
- Father: Folke the Fat
- Mother: Ingegerd Knutsdotter of Denmark

Bengt Snivil was a medieval Swedish magnate of the House of Bjälbo. He was a son of Folke the Fat and Ingegerd Knutsdotter of Denmark, a daughter of King Canute IV of Denmark.

According to Saxo Grammaticus, Folke the Fat had two sons, Bengt and Knut, and was the grandfather of Birger Brosa, although Saxo does not identify which of the two brothers was Birger's father. A genealogical account compiled in the late 15th century identifies Bengt as the father of Birger Brosa, Magnus Minnesköld and Karl the Deaf. Contemporary charters independently attest that Birger had brothers named Magnus and Karl, although they do not identify their father.

Later genealogical literature has sometimes attributed the title of jarl to Bengt, but no contemporary evidence is known to establish that he held the office.

== Children ==
The late medieval genealogy attributes three sons to Bengt:

- Birger Brosa, jarl of Sweden
- Magnus Minnesköld, father of Birger Jarl
- Karl the Deaf, jarl of Sweden and father of Ulf Fase
