= Bridget Haraldsdotter =

Queen of Sweden from 1160 to 1161

Queen consort of Sweden
- Tenure: 1160–1161
- Born: c. 1131
- Died: c. 1208
- Burial: Riseberga Abbey
- Father: Harald IV Gille

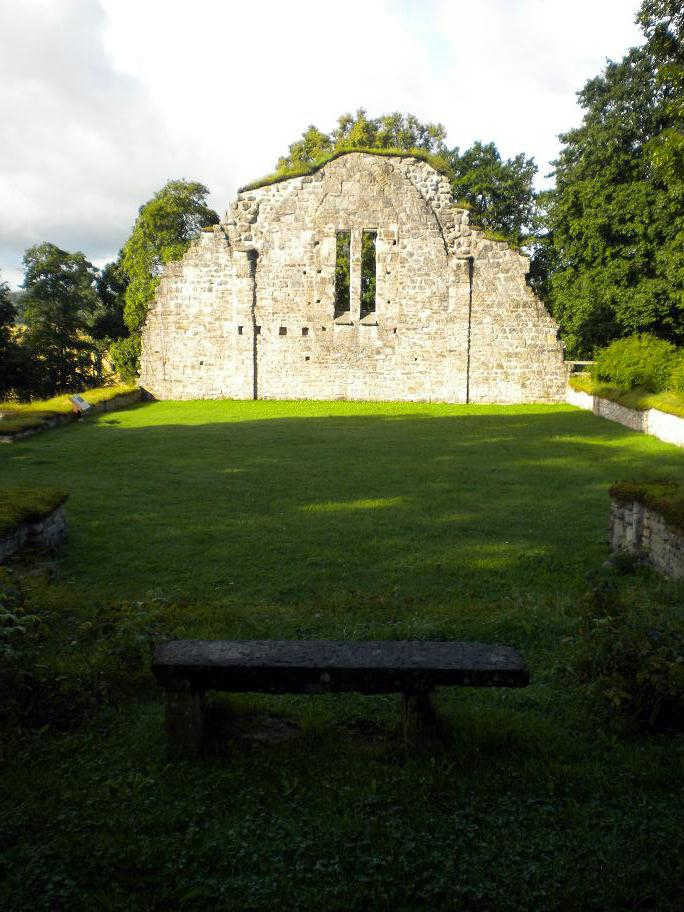
Riseberga Abbey, the burial ground of queen Bridget.

Bridget Haraldsdotter, also Brigida (Swedish: Birgitta Haraldsdotter) (c. 1131 – c. 1208) was Queen of Sweden as the spouse of King Magnus Henriksen.

Brigida Haraldsdotter was the illegitimate daughter of King Harald IV of Norway. Her mother is unknown, but she was possibly Tora Guttormsdotter, long-term lover of her father and the mother of King Sigurd II of Norway. Her Irish first name was the same as that of her father's Irish mother, Brigida O'Brien (d. 1138). According to legend, she was first married to King Inge the Younger, but this is not considered possible; likely, her first marriage was to the Swedish jarl Karl Sunesson. She was married to Magnus Henriksen, son of her stepmother Ingrid Ragnvaldsdotter and Ingrid's first husband, Henrik Skadelår. Her spouse claimed the Swedish throne through his mother in 1160–61. After his death in 1161, she remarried the Swedish jarl Birger Brosa of the Bjälbo family. The daughter she had during her marriage to Brosa, Ingegerd Birgersdotter, was to become Queen of Sweden in 1200 as the wife of Sverker the Younger.

In 1174, the Norwegian throne claimant Øystein Møyla, who claimed to be her nephew, asked for the support of her and her husband, which they also granted. In 1176, the Norwegian throne claimant Sverre of Norway did the very same thing. He was turned away at first, but in 1177, they advised the Birkebeiner to acknowledge Sverre as their King and gave him the support of them and of the Swedish King. Bridget's son Filippus would also join Sverre's service. Brosa died in 1202. In 1205, a conflict broke out between her daughter Queen Ingegerd and the Bjälbo family.

The dates of her birth and death are not known, though her daughter's birth year is set at c. 1180. The dates c. 1131–1208 have been suggested. After the death of her second spouse in 1202, she retired to the Riseberga Nunnery in Närke, where she died and was buried.

== Children ==
- Philippus Birgersson (d. 1200), Jarl of Norway in the service of King Sverre of Norway and one of his most staunch supporters.
- Knut Birgersson, jarl of Sweden. According to one source, Knut was married to king Knut Eriksson's daughter, named Sigrid in that source. He was killed in 1208 at the Battle of Lena
- Folke Birgersson, aka Folke jarl, jarl of Sweden, killed 1210 at Battle of Gestilren
- Ingegerd Birgersdotter (ca 1180–1230), Queen of Sweden 1200–1208, married to king Sverker the Younger and the mother of King Johan Sverkersson
- Kristina Birgersdotter
- Margareta Birgersdotter

Bridget Haraldsdotter Died: after 1180
Swedish royalty
Preceded by Christina Björnsdotter	Queen consort of Sweden; 1160–1161	Succeeded by Christine Stigsdotter
