= Lääne County =

County of Estonia

Coordinates: 58°55′N 23°45′E

Lääne County Läänemaa
- County
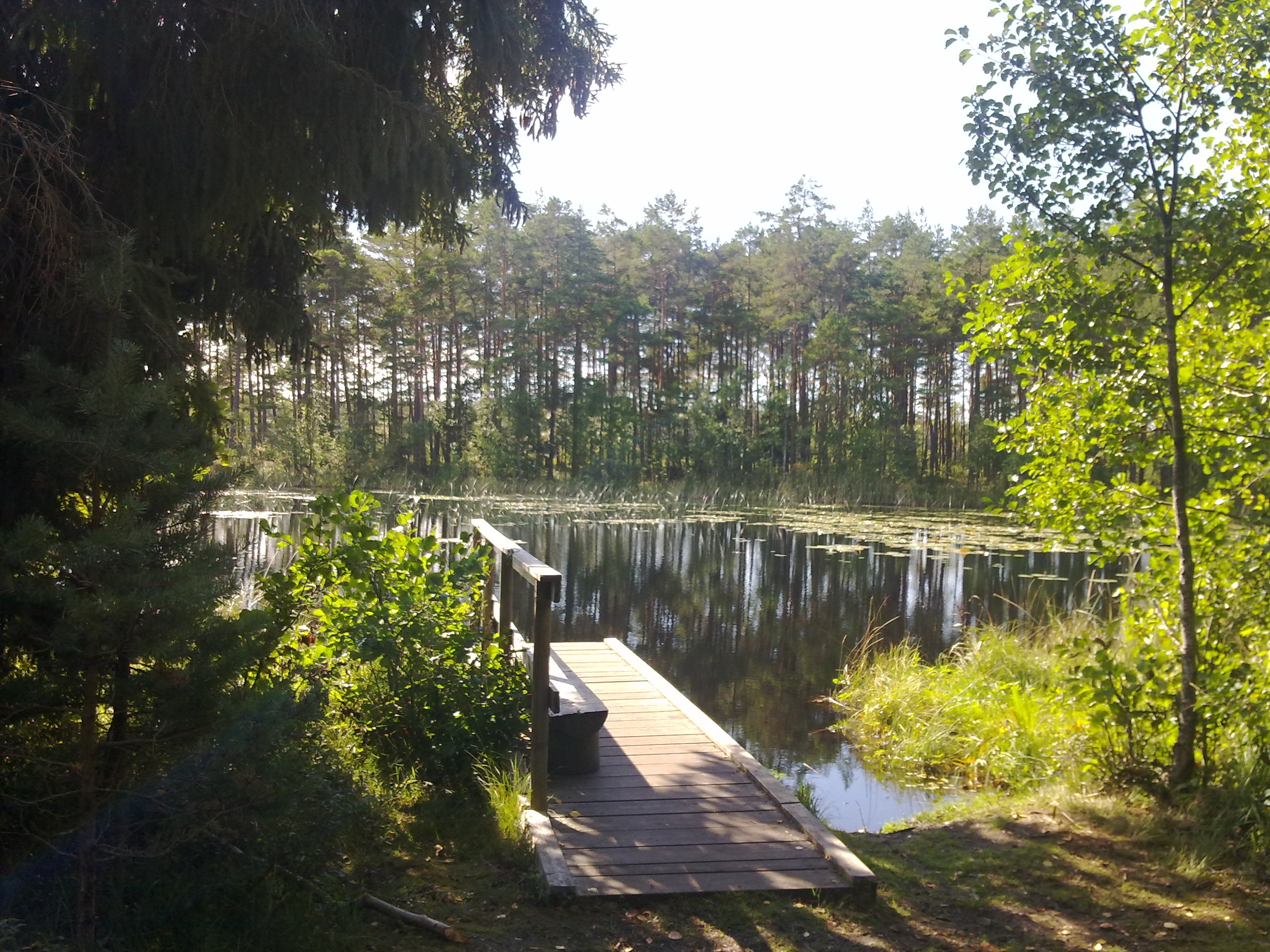

- Flag Coat of arms

- Country: Estonia
- Capital: Haapsalu

Area
  - Total: 2,383 km^{2} (920 sq mi)

Population (2022)
  - Total: 20,227
  - Rank: 14th
  - Density: 10.3/km^{2} (27/sq mi)

Ethnicity
  - Estonians: 89.3%
  - Russians: 7.4%
  - other: 3.3%

GDP
  - Total: €320 million (2022)
  - Per capita: €15,658 (2022)
- ISO 3166 code: EE-56
- Vehicle registration: S

Lääne County (Estonian: Lääne maakond or Läänemaa, literally "Western land"; German: Wiek; Latin: Rotalia) is one of the 15 counties of Estonia. It is located in western Estonia and borders the Baltic Sea to the north, Harju County to the northeast, Rapla County to the east, Pärnu County to the south, and the island counties of Saare and Hiiu to the west. In January 2009, Lääne County had a population of 23,810 – constituting 2.0% of the total population in Estonia.

== County government ==
Until 2017 the County Government (Estonian: maavalitsus) was led by a governor (Estonian: maavanem), who was appointed by the Government of Estonia for a term of five years. Since 15 December 2011, the governorship was held by Innar Mäesalu.

=== Maavanem 1918–1941 ===
- Aleksander Saar 1917–1927
- Artur Kasterpalu 1930–1941

=== Maavanem 1993–2017 ===
- Andres Lipstok 14 December 1993 – 12 August 1994
- Hannes Danilov 1 November 1994 – 3 January 1999
- Arder Väli 23 February 1999 – 20 July 1999
- Jaanus Sahk 22 September 1999 – 22 September 2004
- Sulev Vare 19 November 2004 – 14 September 2007
- Neeme Suur 18 February 2008 – 4 April 2011
- Innar Mäesalu 15 December 2011 -

== Municipalities ==
The county is subdivided into municipalities. There is one urban municipality, Haapsalu (Estonian: linn – town) and 2 rural municipalities (Estonian: vallad – parishes) in Lääne County.

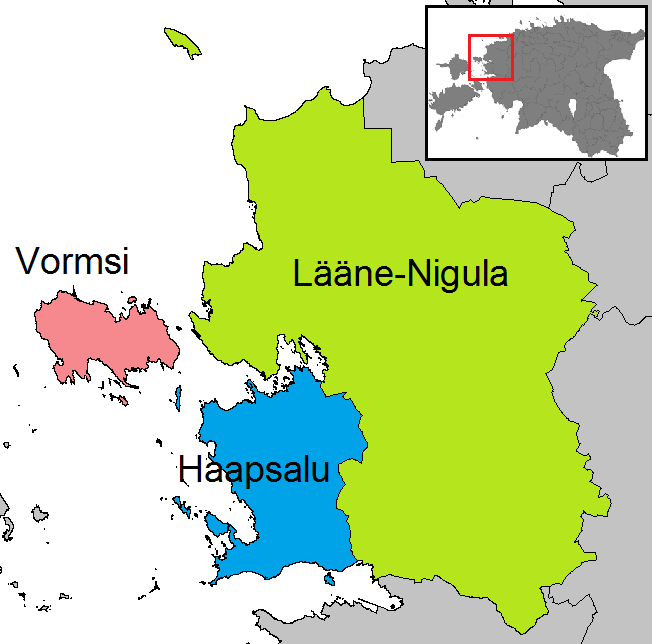
Municipalities in Lääne County

Rank	Municipality	Type	Population (2018)	Area km^{2}	Density
1	Haapsalu	Urban	13,516	264	51.2
2	Lääne-Nigula Parish	Rural	7,239	1,451	5.0
3	Vormsi Parish	Rural	419	93	4.5

== Religion ==
The Lääne deanery of Saare-Lääne Diocese of the Estonian Evangelical Lutheran Church in the county includes the Haapsalu St. John's congregation, Kullamaa St. John's congregation, Lääne-Nigula St. Nicholas' congregation, Martna St. Martin's congregation, Noarootsi St. Catherine's congregation, Nõva St. Olav's congregation, Piirsalu congregation and Ridala St. Mary Magdalene's .congregation. Regarding the Orthodox congregations in the county, the St.Prince-Alexander.Nevsky congregation, subordinate to the Estonian Orthodox Church of the Moscow Patriarchate, is located in Haapsalu.

Baptist congregations in the county operate in the following places: Haapsalu, Palivere, Ridala, Sutlepa, Vormsi and Mäevalla. Also two Methodist congregations and an Adventist congregation operate in Haapsalu. A Pentecostal congregation operates in Palivere. There is also a Kingdom Hall of Jehovah's Witnesses in Haapsalu.

Religious affiliations in Lääne County, census 2000–2021*
Religion	2000		2011		2021	
Religion	Number	%	Number	%	Number	%
Christianity	5,109	22,3	4,418	21.3	4,050	23.6
—Orthodox Christians	921	4.0	1,052	5.0	1,290	7.4
—Lutherans	3,580	15.6	2,773	13.4	1,960	11.4
—Catholics	46	0.2	32	0.1	40	0.2
—Baptists	358	1.5	234	1.1	450	2.6
—Jehovah's Witnesses	74	0.3	93	0.4	90	0.5
—Pentecostals	70	0.3	46	0.2	80	0.4
—Old Believers	-		3	0.01	-	
—Methodists	73	0.3	36	0.1	20	0.1
—Adventists	61	0.2	46	0.2	50	0.3
—Other Christians	-		103	0.5	70	0.3
Islam	12	0.05	8	0.02	-	
Buddhism	-	-	14	0.04	-	
Other religions**	98	0.4	210	1.0	200	1.1
No religion	8,632	37.8	13,126	64.5	10,920	63.6
Not stated***	8,914	39.0	2,798	13.5	1,940	11.3
Total population*	22,840		20,673		17,170	
*The censuses of Estonia count the religious affiliations of the population older than 15 years of age. ".

== History ==
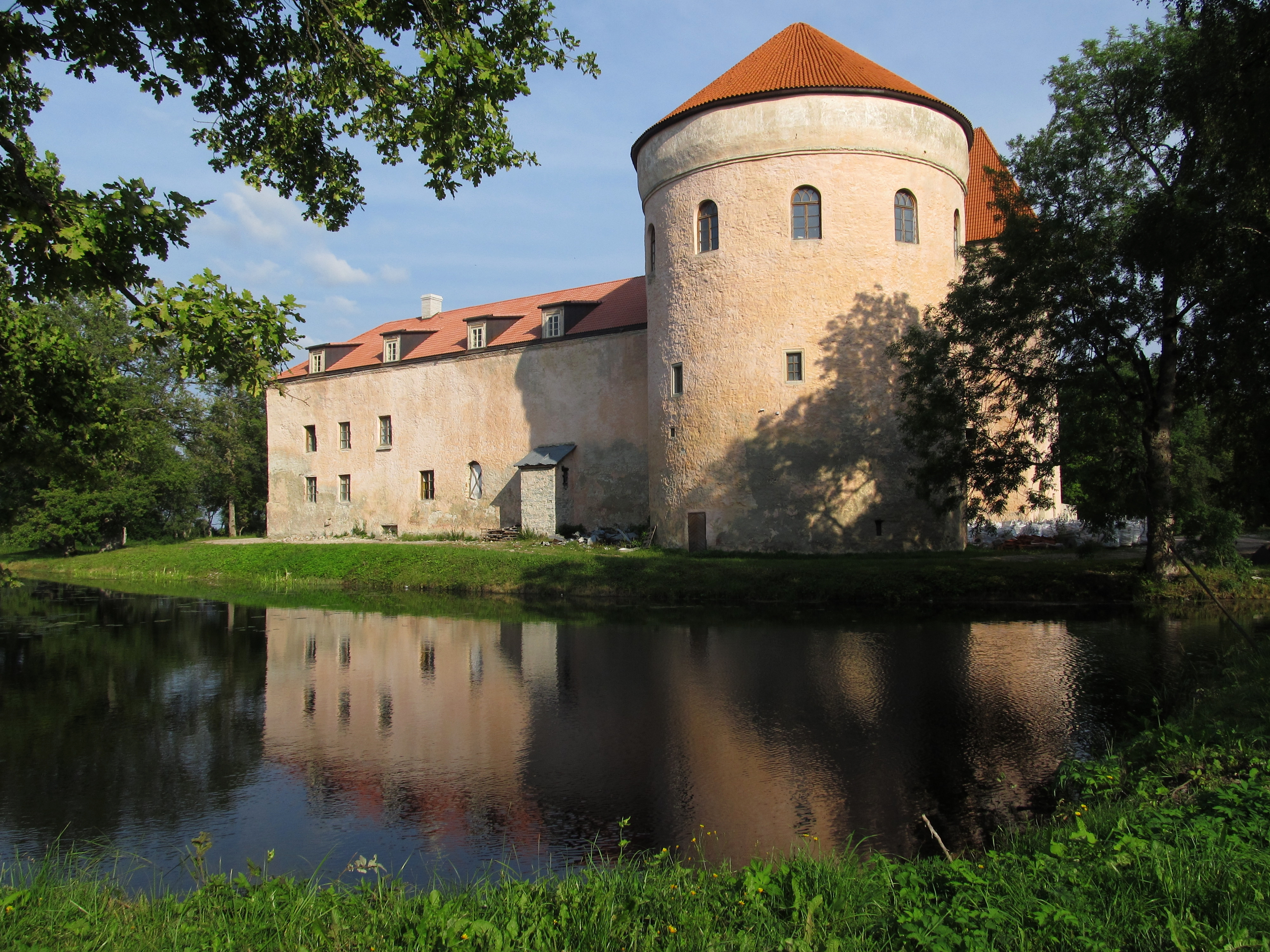
Koluvere castle dating from the 13th century

In the first centuries AD political and administrative subdivisions began to emerge in Estonia. Two larger subdivisions appeared: the parish (Estonian: kihelkond) and the county (Estonian: maakond). A parish consisted of several villages. Nearly all parishes had at least one fortress. The defense of the local area was directed by the highest official, the parish elder. A county was composed of several parishes, also headed by an elder. By the 13th century the following major districts had developed in Estonia: Saaremaa (Osilia), Läänemaa (Rotalia or Maritima), Harjumaa (Harria), Rävala (Revalia), Virumaa (Vironia), Järvamaa (Jervia), Sakala (Saccala), and Ugandi (Ugaunia).

Läänemaa (Latin: Rotalia, Maritima, Low German: Wiek) was an independent country on the east coast of the Baltic Sea, bordered by Revala, Harjumaa, Alempois, and Sakala. Läänemaa had an area of approximately 1900 hides. Early in 1220 troops from Sweden, initially led by King John I, had invaded Läänemaa. The Swedish army took the Lihula stronghold and set up a small garrison. Swedish Jarl Karl Döve and Bishop Karl Magnusson of Linköping, both from the powerful House of Bjälbo, also remained in the castle. On August 8, 1220, the united Œselian and Rotalian armies encircled the castle at dawn. It was set ablaze in the course of the fierce battle that ensued. The Swedish troops tried to make their way out, but were killed on site apart from a few who succeeded in escaping to Tallinn, held by Denmark. The Jarl, the Bishop, and almost 500 other Swedes were killed, leaving no Swedish presence in Estonia at all. The short-lived Swedish attempt to gain foothold in Estonia was motivated by the quickly advancing Danish and Low German crusaders who had been able to conquer most of the area in the early 13th century. Defeat in the Battle of Lihula discouraged the Swedish expansion to Estonia for more than 300 years, and the country was left for the Teutonic Knights, Low German Bishops and Denmark to divide. In the meantime, Sweden focused on Finland and the Swedish-Novgorodian Wars. After the Livonian Crusade Läänemaa became the main territory of the Bishopric of Ösel-Wiek, an independent Bishopric. Parts of the Bishop's castle are still preserved in Haapsalu.

=== Historic parishes (kihelkonnad) ===
- Hanila
- Cozzo (Karuse)
- Corbe (Kõrve)
- Lihula
- Ridala
- Soontagana (et:Soontagana)
- around Märjamaa

After the German conquest in 1227, Lääne County became the center of the Bishopric of Ösel-Wiek, an independent principality within the Livonian Confederation. Parts of Bishop's castle are still preserved in Haapsalu.

== See also ==
- Matsalu National Park
