= Ingegerd Birgersdotter =

Queen of Sweden from 1200 to 1208

Queen consort of Sweden
- Tenure: c. 1200–1208
- Born: c. 1180
- Died: c. 1210/1230
- Spouse: Sverker the Younger
- Issue: Johan Sverkersson
- Father: Birger Brosa
- Mother: Brigida Haraldsdotter

Ingegerd (or Ingegärd) Birgersdotter (c. 1180 – 7 April after 1210, possibly 1230) was Queen of Sweden as the second wife of King Sverker II.

Ingegerd was born into one of Sweden's most powerful noble families, the Bjälbo family, as the child of the powerful Jarl Birger Brosa and the Queen Dowager Brigida Haraldsdotter; her mother was the child of King Harald Gille of Norway and had, in her first marriage, herself been the Queen of Sweden in 1160–1161.

== Life as queen ==
In c. 1200, she was married to King Sverker after the death of his first consort Benedicta, and became Queen of Sweden directly upon her marriage. Through her connections, she was to play an important part in her husband's politics. In 1202, her father died, and queen Ingegerd and her husband proclaimed their one-year-old son Prince Johan as the heir and head of the Bjälbo clan through her, with the title jarl. It appears that this move estranged the Bjälbo clan from Sverker's court. The sons of the previous king Canute I fled to Norway in 1204, returning in the next year with Norwegian backing. Three of the sons were killed at the Battle of Älgarås while the fourth, Eric escaped. These bloody events seem to have set Ingegerd's relatives on Eric's side, as seen from events in the next years. Whatever attempts Ingegerd may have done to act as mediator between the king and her family failed to reconcile them. Sverker and Eric met at the Battle of Lena in 1208 where her brother Knut Jarl was killed on Eric's side, possibly together with her uncle Magnus Minniskiöld. However, Eric won and was established as king. Two years later, in 1210, her husband tried to regain the throne but was killed at the Battle of Gestilren. Folke Jarl, probably another of her brothers, was slain on Eric's side.

== After Gestilren ==
The later life of queen Ingegerd is not known, nor is the year of her death. In 1216, her son Johan was made king, but the sources do not mention anything about his mother. Historians suggest that she spent her later life with her brother Magnus, in Scania, or in some other part of Denmark. It has been suggested that she may have survived until c. 1230.

The sources for Ingegerd's history are limited to a few references in Norse sources. The lack of chronological precision has caused an alternative interpretation of the order of Sverker II's marriages. Thus Ingegerd might have been the first queen in the late 12th and early 13th centuries. After her death, Sverker would have married Benedicta Ebbesdotter of Hvide, whose father Ebbe Sunesen, a brother of Archbishop Andreas Sunesen in Lund, supported Sverker in the disastrous Battle of Lena.

== Children ==
- John I of Sweden, (1201?–1222), king 1216–1222.

Ingegerd Birgersdotter Born: c. 1180 Died: 7 April after 1210 (1230?)
Royal titles
Preceded by Benedicta Hvide	Queen consort of Sweden; 1200–1208	Vacant Title next held by Rikissa of Denmark
