= Gregers Birgersson =

Swedish knight

Coat of arms of the illegitimate branch of the House of Bjälbo

Gregers Birgersson (died 15 January 1276), also known as Gregorius, was a Swedish knight and landowner. He was an illegitimate son of Birger Jarl of the House of Bjälbo and an unknown woman, and was therefore a grandson of Magnus Minnesköld and Ingrid Ylva.

Evidence that Birger Jarl had an illegitimate son named Gregers comes from a notice of Gregers's death in excerpts made by the 17th-century Danish historian Otto Sperling from a now-lost copy of an Icelandic annal. The relationship is also supported by a charter dated 27 March 1272, issued by a man described as G quondam ducis filius ("G., son of the late duke").

Gregers owned large estates on Arnö in Uppland. In 1272, he exchanged his estate at Baldastad in Närke for Ängsö in Västmanland. He was married to a woman whose name is unknown and who apparently owned land in Södermanland.

Gregers died in 1276 and was buried at the Franciscan friary in Uppsala. He is regarded as the progenitor of the lineage known as Bjälboättens oäkta gren ("the illegitimate branch of the House of Bjälbo"), also known as Folkungaättens oäkta gren.

He is regarded as the progenitor of the lineage known as Bjälboättens oäkta gren ("the illegitimate branch of the House of Bjälbo"), also known as Folkungaättens oäkta gren. Through his descendants, Gregers was an ancestor of Gustav I of Sweden.

== Children ==
Gregers had at least five children:

- Knut Gregersson
- Magnus Gregersson
- Karl Gregersson
- An unnamed daughter, who married Filip Ingevaldsson (Örnsparre)
- At least one additional unnamed daughter, possibly the mother of Mats Kettilmundsson
