= Jon Jarl =

Swedish jarl (died c. 1206)

- Earl

Earl of Sweden
- Reign: ?–1206
- Predecessor: Johan Sverkersson
- Successor: Knut Birgersson
- Other titles: "Terror of the Heathen"
- Born: Jon
- Died: c. 1206; Asknäs, Ekerö, Sweden
- Buried: Linköping Cathedral (disputed)
- Noble family: Possibly Sverker
- Occupation: Privateer

Jon Jarl was a Swedish jarl at the end of the 12th and in the early 13th centuries. He is mentioned in Erik's Chronicle from the 1320s to have spent years fighting against Russians and Ingrians in the early Swedish–Novgorodian Wars.

According to 15th-century historian Ericus Olai, he was murdered at his home in Asknäs in Ekerö parish by the Lake Mälaren in 1206, allegedly by Russian pirates.

According to Erik's Chronicle, Jon Jarl was a Swedish earl in the east tasked with the protection of the kingdom against Russians and Ingrians. Sven Tunberg considers it likely that the earl belonged to the Sverker family and that he was King Sverker the Younger's "Finnish earl" for nine years.

== Death according to Erik's Chronicle ==
According to Erik's Chronicle, after being away for nine years, Jon Jarl was killed on his farm at Askanäs on Ekerö by Karelian or Russian pirates the same night that he returned from a crusade between Ingrians and Russians.

The Chronicle states:

Thz er swa sant som jak her læss
Jon jerl ward dræpin i askaness

Jon's wife fled across the bay to Hundhamra (i.e. Norsborg), and gathered a mob to kill the perpetrators.

They caught up and fought them off at "Eesta skär" (i.e. Estbröte, a high islet in the fairway between Ekerö and Johannesdal, in the southwest of Stockholm).

How accurately the chronicle reproduces the actual sequence of events is unclear.

== Tombstone ==
No historical evidence on the jarl exists, although he may be the "Johannes Dux" who is shown on an undated tombstone also labelled "Terror of the heathens" Linköping Cathedral.

Preceded by Johan Sverkersson	Earl of Sweden ?-1206	Succeeded by Knut Birgersson
