= Ingrid Ylva =

Swedish noblewoman (c. 1180s–c. 1250)

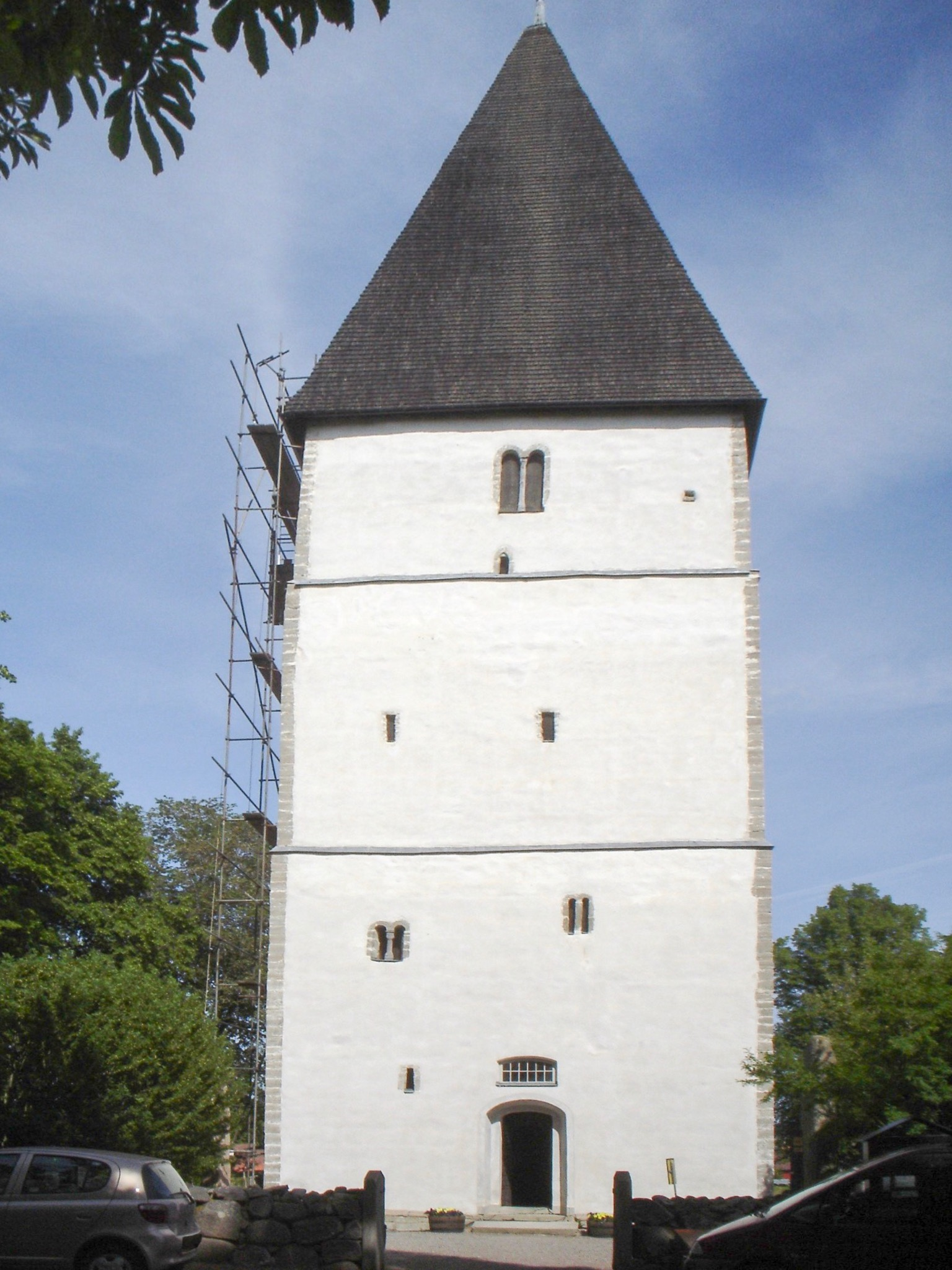
The Bjälbo Church tower of Ingrid Ylva

Ingrid Ylva (c. 1180s – c. 1250–1255) was a Swedish noblewoman, the wife of Magnus Minnesköld of Bjälbo and the mother of regent Birger Jarl. The exact years of her birth and death are unclear; a traditional year quoted for her death is 26 October 1252; it is also considered, though, that this was the date of her burial, and that she had actually died in 1251.

== Biography ==
According to Olaus Petri, she was the daughter of Sune Sik. She was married to Magnus Minnesköld of Bjälbo, possibly as his second wife. Several of his sons, born or raised by Ingrid Ylva, would come to hold positions of power when grown: Eskil became lawspeaker in Västergötland, Karl and Bengt both became bishops of Linköping and Birger became Jarl of Sweden, and later had his son elected king.

As a widow, in c. 1208–1210, she most likely managed her estates in Bjälbo as the head of the family, due to her sons being minors. She attended the church from her favourite place in the church tower, to which she had once donated a bell; according to tradition, she often lived in this tower during insecure times. In 1234, her son Birger married Princess Ingeborg Eriksdotter of Sweden, and in 1250, he became regent and father of the king. It remains unclear if Ingrid Ylva was still alive at this point, though it is believed that she was. However, she does not seem to have played any part at the royal court, and probably preferred to stay within her estates. She is said to have married again, to an unnamed man with whom she had a son, Elof Vingad Pil, while other sources claim she remained unmarried.

== Ingrid Ylva in legend ==
Ingrid Ylva is known in various legends, and possibly in her time, as a so-called white witch; she was said to be able to master magic, which she used for good purposes and for her family's good fortune. A lot of stories were told about her magical skills. One legend said that once, when Bjälbo was subjected to a surprise attack from the enemies of the family, Ingrid Ylva rushed to the top of the church tower, and, from there, she ripped open a pillow full of feathers which spread across the land and turned into knights in armour. These magical stories were far from slander: in the 13th century, the witch trials were hundreds of years in the future, magic was not illegal and the ability to master magic was considered a great and admirable skill; there was a clear separation between white and black magic; and not even black magic was yet connected to the Devil or punishable by death, as it would become later. Her name was widely known long before her son became regent, and her alleged magical skill was highly admired.

She was widely regarded for her ability to foretell the future. Legend claims, that on her deathbed she predicted that her line would succeed to the Swedish throne, as long as her head was held high. Legend says, that because of this, her son, the regent, buried her standing upright, inside the tower with which she had had such a close relationship.

== References and literature ==
- Runeberg.org (in Swedish)
- Jan Guillou: "Häxornas försvarare" (Defender of the witches) (in Swedish)
- Christer Öhman: "Helgon, bönder och krigare. Berättelser ur den svenska historien" (Saints, peasants and warriors. Stories from the Swedish history) (in Swedish) (1994)
