= Ulf Fase =

Swedish jarl (died 1247)

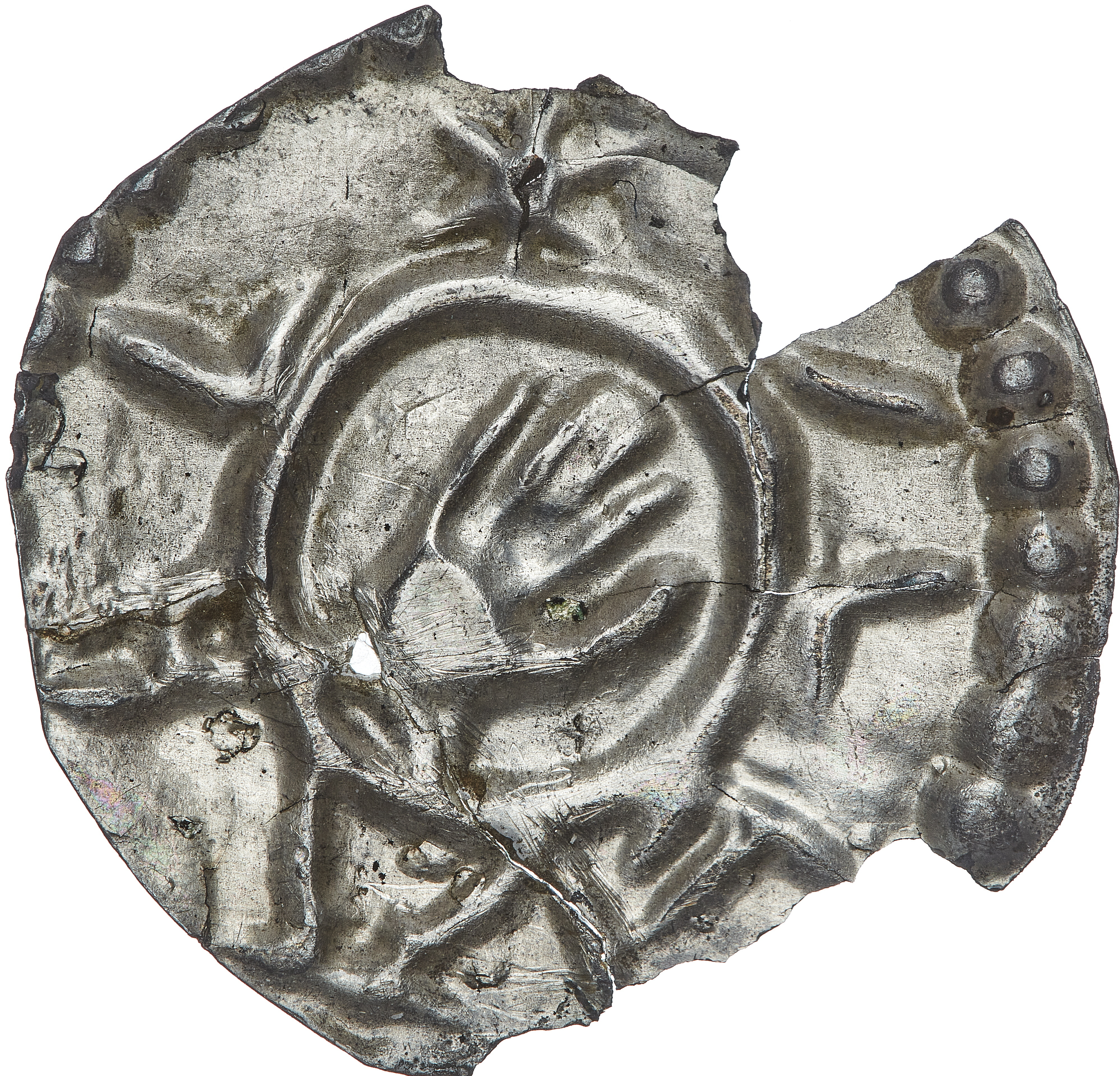
Coin issued by Ulf Fase, c. 1240. The inscription says VLF IARL (Ulf Jarl).

Ulf Fase (died 1247) was the jarl of Sweden from c. 1221 until his death in 1247.

== Biography ==
Ulf Fase was probably the son of jarl Karl the Deaf (Karl Döve) and member the House of Folkung (Folkungaätten). After jarl Karl had been killed during the Swedish attack against Estonians at the Battle of Lihula in 1220, Ulf as his closest relative was soon selected as the new jarl. An ephemeral jarl may have served briefly before Ulf's appointment. Before the death of King Johan Sverkersson of Sweden in 1222, Ulf certainly held the office.

In 1222, the rival dynasty's young heir, King Erik Eriksson ascended the throne at the age of 6. His minority meant that Jarl Ulf gained more importance along with Knut Långe. The nominal regent was Ulf's cousin Bengt Birgersson. In 1229, Knut Långe usurped the throne and exiled the young Erik. Ulf continued to hold the position of jarl. Upon Knut's death in 1234, King Erik, now 18, was restored to the throne. His supporters did not appreciate Ulf's "treachery" in accepting an usurper over Erik five years earlier. Ulf however was too powerful to be deposed from his office. There are clear records to show that Ulf Fase had the right to mint money, an otherwise exclusively royal prerogative. Several pieces of such coins, bearing his signs, are preserved.

In 1247, there was an attempted coup against King Erik. The rebels were crushed at the Battle of Sparrsätra. Sources do not reveal whether Ulf was already dead at that time, or if alive, what was his role in the revolt. It has been speculated that he participated in the revolt and was therefore executed. Several rebel leaders were beheaded in 1247-48, including Knut's son Holmger (1210s – 1248). After Ulf's death, the office of jarl was held by his relative Birger Magnusson (better known as Birger Jarl).

Ulf Fase left one well-attested son, Karl Ulfsson who had bad relations with Birger Jarl. He later left into voluntary exile by joining the Teutonic Knights in Livonia. Karl was killed in 1260 at the Battle of Durbe near Riga in Courland.
