= Bridget of Sweden (disambiguation) =

Bridget of Sweden - Swedish: Birgitta - may refer to:

- Bridget Haraldsdotter or Brigida (c.1131–c. 1208), Queen consort of Sweden 1160–1161
- Bridget, Princess of Sweden (1446–1469), daughter of King Charles VIII of Sweden
- Princess Birgitta of Sweden (1937–2024), Princess of Sweden
- Bridget of Sweden (c. 1303–1373), Swedish saint, related to the royal family of Sweden (had no Swedish royal title)
