= Birger Jarl =

Jarl of Sweden from 1248 to 1266

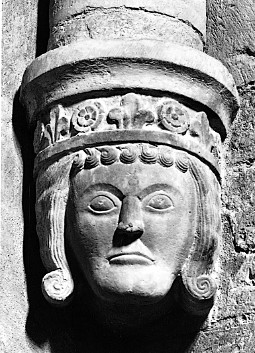
- Birger, depicted in a corbel in Varnhem Church, wears a ducal coronet that fuses Norwegian and continental styles with English influences.

Jarl of Sweden
- Tenure: c. 1248 – 1266
- Monarchs: Erik Eriksson; Valdemar Birgersson
- Predecessor: Ulf Fase
- Successor: Office abolished
- Born: c. 1210 probably in Östergötland
- Died: 21 October 1266 (aged 55–56); Jälbolung, Västergötland
- Buried: Varnhem Abbey, Västergötland
- Noble family: Bjälbo
- Spouses: Ingeborg Eriksdotter of Sweden; Mechtilde of Holstein
- Issue: Rikissa, Queen of Norway; Valdemar, King of Sweden; Kristina Birgersdotter; Magnus, King of Sweden; Erik Birgersson; Bengt, Duke of Finland; Gregers Birgersson (illegitimate)
- Father: Magnus Minniskiöld
- Mother: Ingrid Ylva

Birger Jarl or Birger Magnusson (c. 1210 – 21 October 1266) was a Swedish statesman, regent, jarl, and a member of the House of Bjälbo, who played a pivotal role in consolidating Sweden after the civil wars between the House of Erik and the House of Sverker. His first marriage was to Princess Ingeborg of Sweden, which created his base of power. Birger led the Second Swedish Crusade, which established Swedish rule in Finland. Additionally, he is traditionally attributed with the foundation of the Swedish capital, Stockholm, around 1250. Birger used the Latin title of dux sveorum et guttorum ("duke of Swedes and Geats").

== Biography ==
=== Early life ===
Birger, likely born around the time of the Battle of Gestilren in 1210, spent his childhood and adolescence in Bjälbo, Östergötland. The exact date of his birth is uncertain and historical sources are contradictory, but examinations of his remains suggest he was around 50 years old at his death in 1266, which would indicate a birth year around 1216. However, since his father, Magnus Minnesköld, is believed to have died no later than 1210, Birger's birth may have occurred a few years earlier.

Birger's mother Ingrid Ylva was, according to Olaus Petri, a daughter of Sune Sik and the granddaughter of King Sverker I of Sweden. His brothers or half-brothers—Eskil, Karl, and Bengt—were born well before 1200, suggesting they likely had a different mother. Birger was named after his uncle Birger Brosa, a jarl from the House of Bjälbo and one of the most powerful men of the era, who died in 1202.

Birger married Ingeborg Eriksdotter, the sister of King Erik Eriksson in the mid-1230s, following intense competition with other suitors, as chronicled in Erik's Chronicle (Erikskrönikan). This combination of family ties and strategic marriage would prove vital in his ascent to power. During the following 15 years, Birger consolidated his position and was probably one of the most influential men years before being formally given the title jarl in 1248 by King Erik.

=== Expeditions to the east ===
According to Erik's Chronicle, Birger led the so-called Second Swedish Crusade across the Baltic Sea to Finland, where he defeated the pagan Tavastians (Häme Finns), forcing them to convert to Christianity. Traditionally, this expedition has been dated to 1249–1250, but many scholars now believe it took place earlier, in 1238–1239, before Birger was made jarl (See Second Swedish Crusade § Dating controversy). Southwest Finland had already been incorporated into the Swedish realm earlier, and a bishopric had been established in Åbo (Turku) by the 1220s at latest. The expedition into Tavastia extended Swedish rule inland. To secure their control, the Swedes began constructing a castle in Tavastia.

According to Russian sources, Birger was also responsible for a military campaign further east in Ingria against the Novgorod Republic in 1240; this campaign ended in a defeat by Prince Alexander Nevsky at the Battle of the Neva. This mention of a battle between Swedish and Novgorodian forces was initially found in a late 13th-century chronicle, and then the four chronicles of Novgorod as well as two other Russian sources. By c. 1330, it had grown into an event of national importance. While Swedish sources do not mention the battle, a 16th-century Russian manuscript called the Life of Alexander Nevsky claims that the Swedish "king" was wounded in the face during a duel with Alexander. Some historians have speculated that traces of a sword blow found on Birger’s cranium may have originated from this battle. However, the original 14th-century Russian record of the battle gives no information on this at all, and the first sources linking Birger Jarl to the Neva campaign date from mid-15th century. It is probable that a lost Novgorodian chronicle was used by the author of the Testament of Magnus Eriksson to name Birger as the leader of the Swedish Neva campaign.

=== Career ===
Coat of arms of Birger jarl

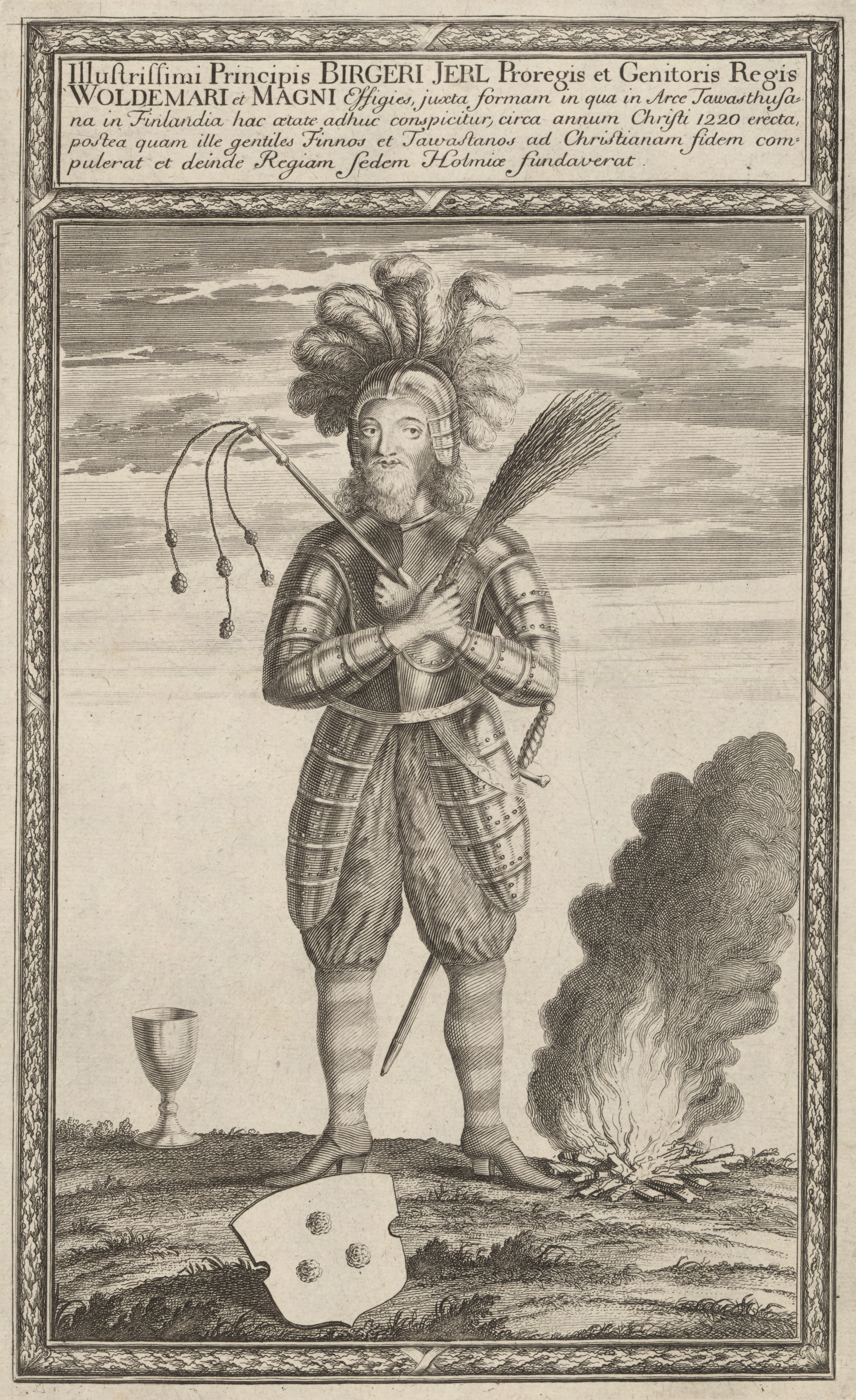
The 17th-century engraving of Birger Jarl by Erik Dahlberg is based on a fresco from Häme Castle, depicting Christ with a scourge and a birch rod.

When the papal diplomat William of Modena visited Sweden around 1248, he urged the Swedish kings to fulfill the rules of the Catholic Church, an exhortation which Birger seems to have taken as a chance to strengthen his position by simply taking the side of the church against other members of his family (alternatively it's possible to interpret this as a manifestation of his pious side). This was a choice of historical importance as it was to make Birger a jarl powerful enough to ultimately wind up the office, thus making him the last Swedish jarl ever. This happened during an era when the inherited concept Folkung became more of a political party and it also meant that other Swedish magnates lost most of their influence.

In 1247, royal troops led by Birger at the Battle of Sparrsätra fought Folkung forces led by pretender Holmger Knutsson, son of King Knut Långe. The Folkungs lost the battle and were unable to resist the central government and its taxes. Holmger Knutsson fled to Gästrikland and was captured there by Birger in the following year. Quickly brought to trial, he was beheaded.

In 1249, Birger succeeded in ending a decades-long period of hostilities with Norway. As part of the Treaty of Lödöse, he also managed to marry off his daughter Rikissa, then only 11 years old, to Haakon Haakonsson the Young, the eldest son of King Haakon IV of Norway. On King Erik's death in 1250, Birger's son Valdemar was elected the new king while Birger acted as regent, holding the true power in Sweden until his death.

In 1252, a year after another victory over the Folkungs at the Battle of Herrevadsbro, Birger wrote two carefully dated letters, the first mention of Stockholm interpreted as the foundation of the city or at least some sort of special interest in the location. Neither of the letters give a description of the location, however, and while archaeological traces of older defensive structures have been found there, what did exist on the premises before the mid-13th century remains debated. It has been suggested Birger chose the location for several reasons: Partly to curb domestic magnates by isolating them with a "lock of Lake Mälaren", offering a defense to the lands around Mälaren from invading enemies in the process; and to create a commercial bridgehead to attract German merchants. While Birger's direct involvement in the foundation of the city remains speculative, it probably was no accident it was founded on the location at this time.

=== Later life and burial ===
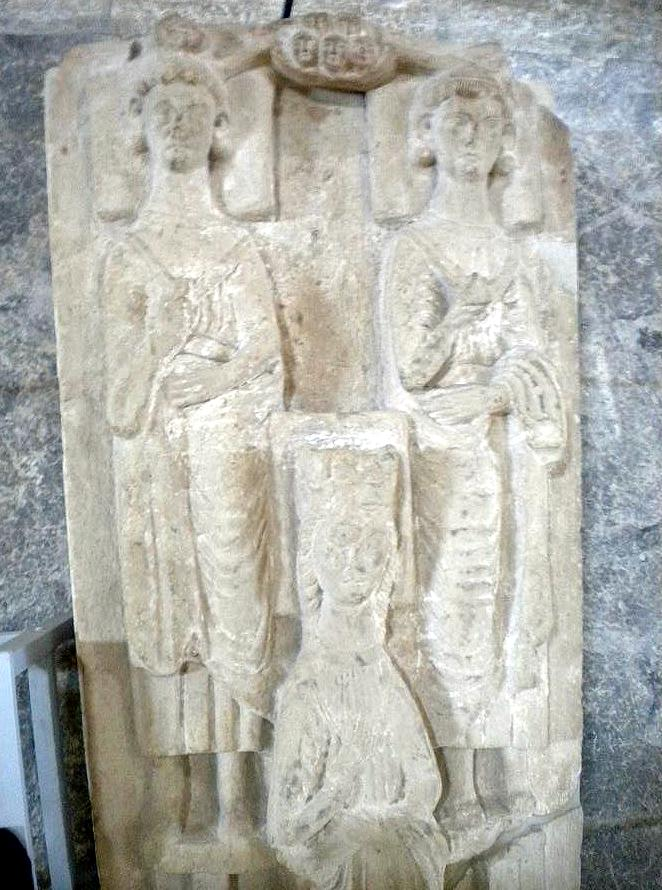
Grave of Birger Jarl, his second wife Mechtilde and Birger's son Duke Erik.

Ingeborg died in 1254. In 1261, Birger married Queen Mechtilde of Holstein, the widow of the Danish king Abel, who had allied herself with the Archbishop Jakob Erlandsen to protect her sons' interitance against King Christopher I of Denmark. The marriage produced no children. Birger died on 21 October 1266, at Jälbolung in Västergötland. After Birger's death, Mechtilde returned to Denmark, where she died in 1288.

Birger, his son Erik and Mechtilde were buried in Varnhem Abbey. The grave was forgotten after a fire in the 16th century and was only rediscovered during restoration work in the 1920s. When opened, it was found to contain two male skeletons and one female skeleton. These findings were later questioned and the grave was reopened in May 2002. The remains were re-examined using modern methods, which confirmed the earlier conclusions. A DNA analysis

Following Birger's death, the title of jarl was replaced with duke.

== Children ==
Birger married Ingeborg Eriksdotter in mid-1230s. The marriage was contracted relatively near the time when Ingeborg's brother, the once-deposed Erik Eriksson, returned from exile in Denmark in 1234. Ingeborg and Birger had the following children:

1. Rikissa, born 1238, married firstly 1251 Haakon Haakonsson the Young, co-king of Norway, and secondly, Henry I, Prince of Werle
2. Valdemar, born c. 1238, king of Sweden 1250–1275, lord of parts of Gothenland until 1278
3. Kristina, married presumably several times, one of her husbands was lord Sigge Guttormsson
4. Magnus Ladulås, born 1240, Duke (of Södermanland), then king of Sweden 1275–90
5. Erik "Allsintet", born 1250, made Duke of Sweden in 1275, few months before his death
6. Bengt, born 1254, Duke of Finland, bishop of Linköping

Hans Gillingstam has argued that Catharina (b. 1245), who married Prince Siegfried I of Anhalt-Zerbst in 1259, and Ingeborg (c. 1254 – 30 June 1302), who married Duke John I of Saxony in 1270, and are mentioned in German sources as "daughters of Swedish king" were daughters of Birger.

Birger also had an illegitimate son, Gregers, whose mother is unknown.

== Legacy ==
In The Cambridge History of Scandinavia, historian Thomas Lindkvist describes Birger Jarl and his uncle Birger Brosa as the most powerful men of their respective eras in Sweden. Lindkvist further emphasizes that the office of jarl played a role in the unification of the Swedish kingdom comparable to that of the monarchy itself.

There is a statue of Birger Jarl in his own square Birger Jarls Torg next to Riddarholm Church in Stockholm, erected by Bengt Erland Fogelberg at the expense of the Governor of Stockholm in 1854. There is a cenotaph for him at the base of the tower of Stockholm City Hall. It was originally intended that his remains be removed there, but this was never done. Several other historical structures there are also named for him including the street Birger Jarlsgatan on Norrmalm and the tower Birger Jarls torn on Riddarholmen. The Hotel Birger Jarl is located in Stockholm's Norrmalm neighborhood. He is also the central figure of Bröllopet på Ulvåsa by Frans Hedberg (1865).

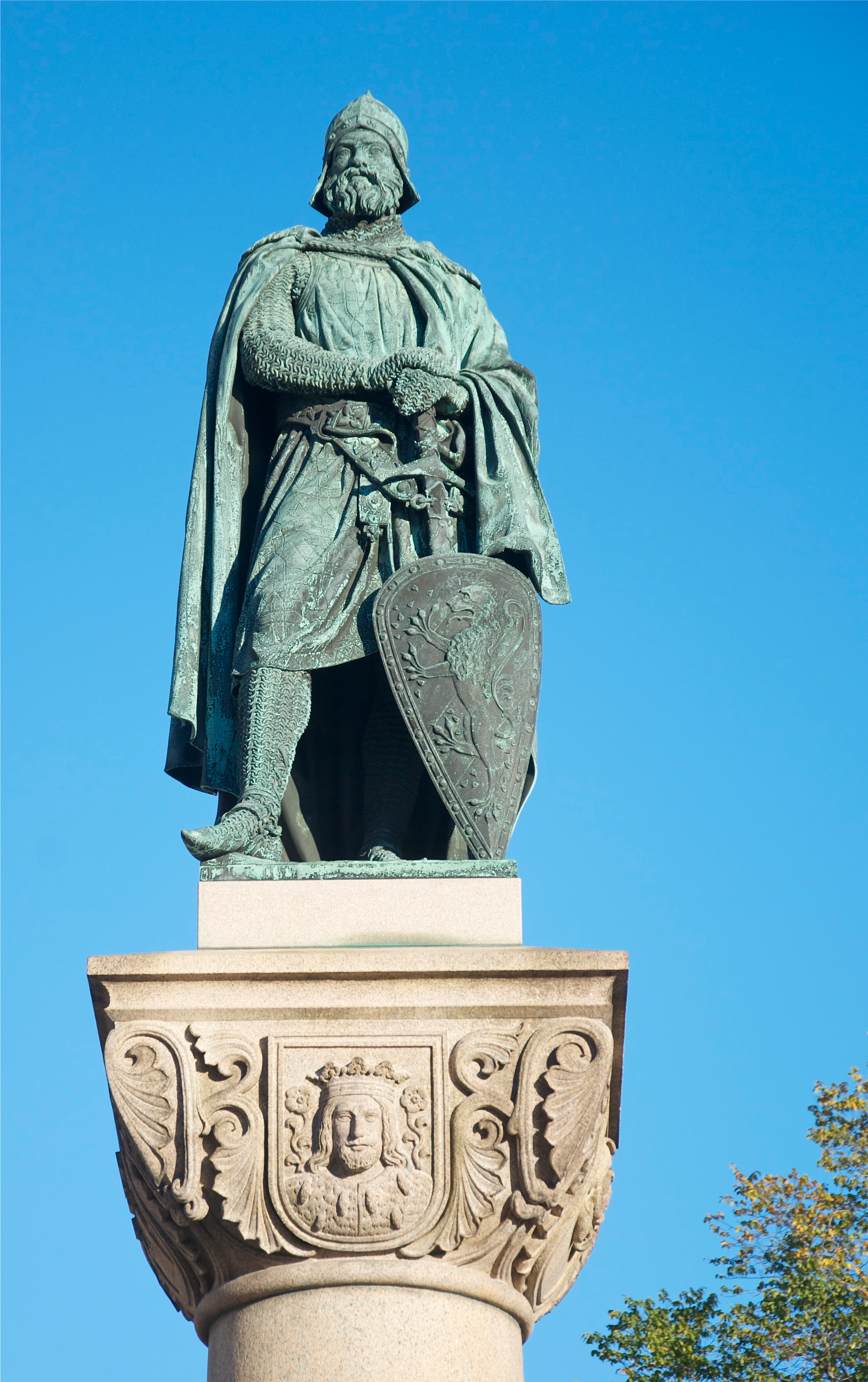
Statue of Birger Jarl (1854) by Bengt Erland Fogelberg in Stockholm

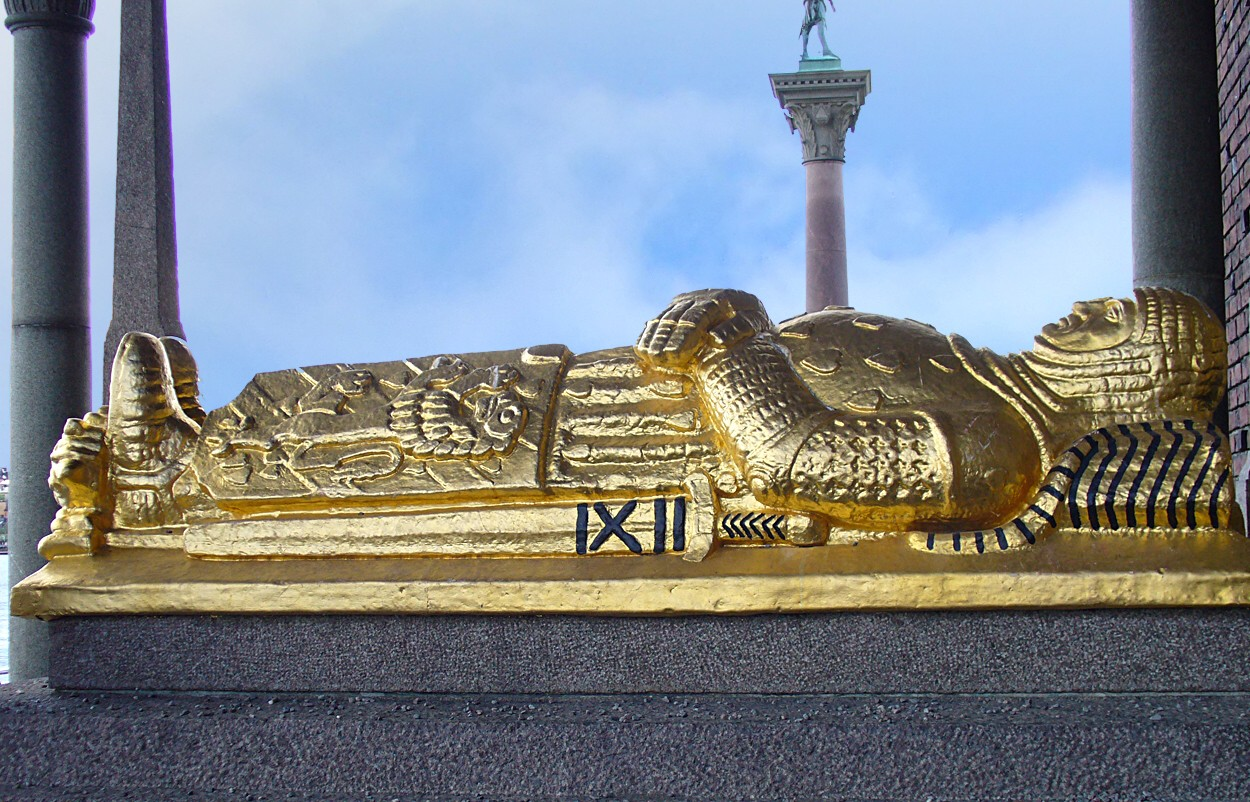
Cenotaph of Birger Jarl at the Stockholm City Hall

Facial reconstruction of Birger Jarl at the Museum of Medieval Stockholm

== See also ==
- List of monarchs and heads of state of Finland
