= Hallur Gissurarson =

Hallur Gissurarson (died 1230) was an Icelandic lawspeaker in the 13th century and later a monk and abbot, at both Helgafellsklaustur and Þykkvabæjarklaustur. He was a member of the Haukdælir family clan, son of Gissur Hallsson, also a lawspeaker, and his wife, Álfheiður Þorvaldsdóttir. He was the brother of Þorvaldur Gissurarson and Magnús Gissurarson, a bishop at Skálholt.
