= Folke the Fat =

Swedish nobleman

- Noble family: Bjälbo
- Spouse: Ingegerd Knutsdotter of Denmark
- Issue: Knut; Benedict

Folke the Fat (Swedish: Folke den tjocke) was a Swedish nobleman who lived around 1100. According to Gesta Danorum, written by the 12th-century Danish chronicler Saxo Grammaticus, called "the most high-born man in Sweden" during the reigns of Kings Inge the Elder and Philip.

He married Ingegerd Knutsdotter of Denmark, daughter of the Danish king Canute IV, who was murdered in 1086. According to Saxo, Folke and Ingegerd had two sons, Knut and Benedict. Saxo also states that Folke was the paternal grandfather of Birger Brosa, who was still alive when Saxo was writing.

In 2017, Dick Harrison wrote in Svenska Dagbladet that Folke the Fat demonstrably existed. He appears not only in the late medieval monastic records from Varnhem but also in the works of Saxo Grammaticus.

== See also ==
- House of Bjälbo
- Folkung
