= Riseberga Abbey =

Cistercian nunnery in Sweden

Coordinates: 59.1544°N 14.8931°E

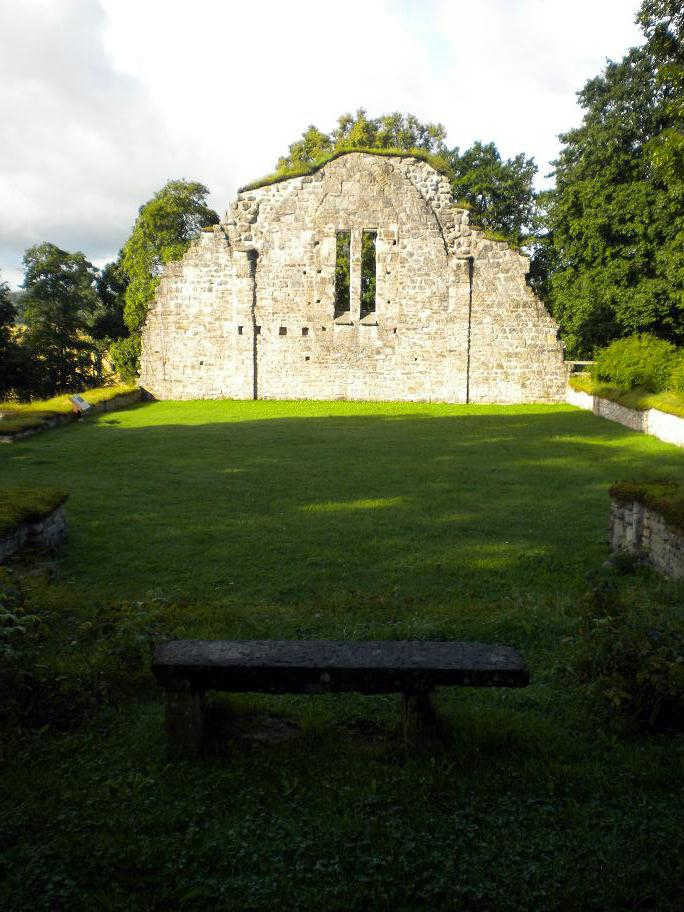
Ruins of Riserberga Abbey

Riseberga Abbey (Swedish: Riseberga kloster), was a Cistercian nunnery in Sweden, in operation from circa 1180 until 1534. It was located near Fjugesta in Närke. It had the right to appoint the vicar of the Edsberg parish, which was under the jurisdiction of the abbey. The ruins of the buildings are preserved, and the Amphitheatre of the abbey are presently used as a Sylvan theater.

== History ==
Riseberga Abbey was founded in the late 12th-century: it is confirmed from at least 1180. It was benefited by Birger Brosa and his second consort queen dowager Bridget Haraldsdotter, who made large donations to it: the latter joined the convent after having been widowed in 1202. The abbey eventually became a large landowner through donations. In 1212, it was granted all confiscated property of convicted criminals for crimes committed in the area.

Riseberga was placed under the administration of Julia and Alvastra monastery. Most of the members were females, but it had a minority of male members to assist the nuns: the males, however, lived outside of the walls of the convent. Riseberga was located isolated in the wilderness, and both nuns and monks of the community are known to have occasionally lived as hermits in the area around the convent. The abbey had the right to appoint the vicars of the Edsberg parish.

In the 1340s, Saint Bridget of Sweden placed her daughter Ingeborg as a novice in the abbey: another one of her daughters, Catherine of Vadstena, was educated here.

=== Dissolution ===
By the Swedish Reformation of 1527 and in accordance with the Reduction of Gustav I of Sweden, Catholic convents were confiscated by the crown and banned from accepting new novices, while the existing members were allowed to leave the convent or remain supported by a royal allowance. In 1534, the remaining members of the abbey left after having applied to be received by a convent abroad.

The buildings burnt down in 1546, and was thereafter long used as a quarry.

== Abbesses ==
The abbesses are only partially known.

- Ragnfrid (14th-century)
- Märta Ydsdotter
- Helena Gisladotter
- Margareta
- Greta (circa 1378-1384)
- Ragnhild (1437)
- Kunigunda (15th-century)
- Christina Pedersdotter (1508)
- Dorotea (1515)

== Legacy ==
Riseberga is the place of the legend of Fair Elisif.
