= Karl the Deaf =

Swedish jarl (died 1220)

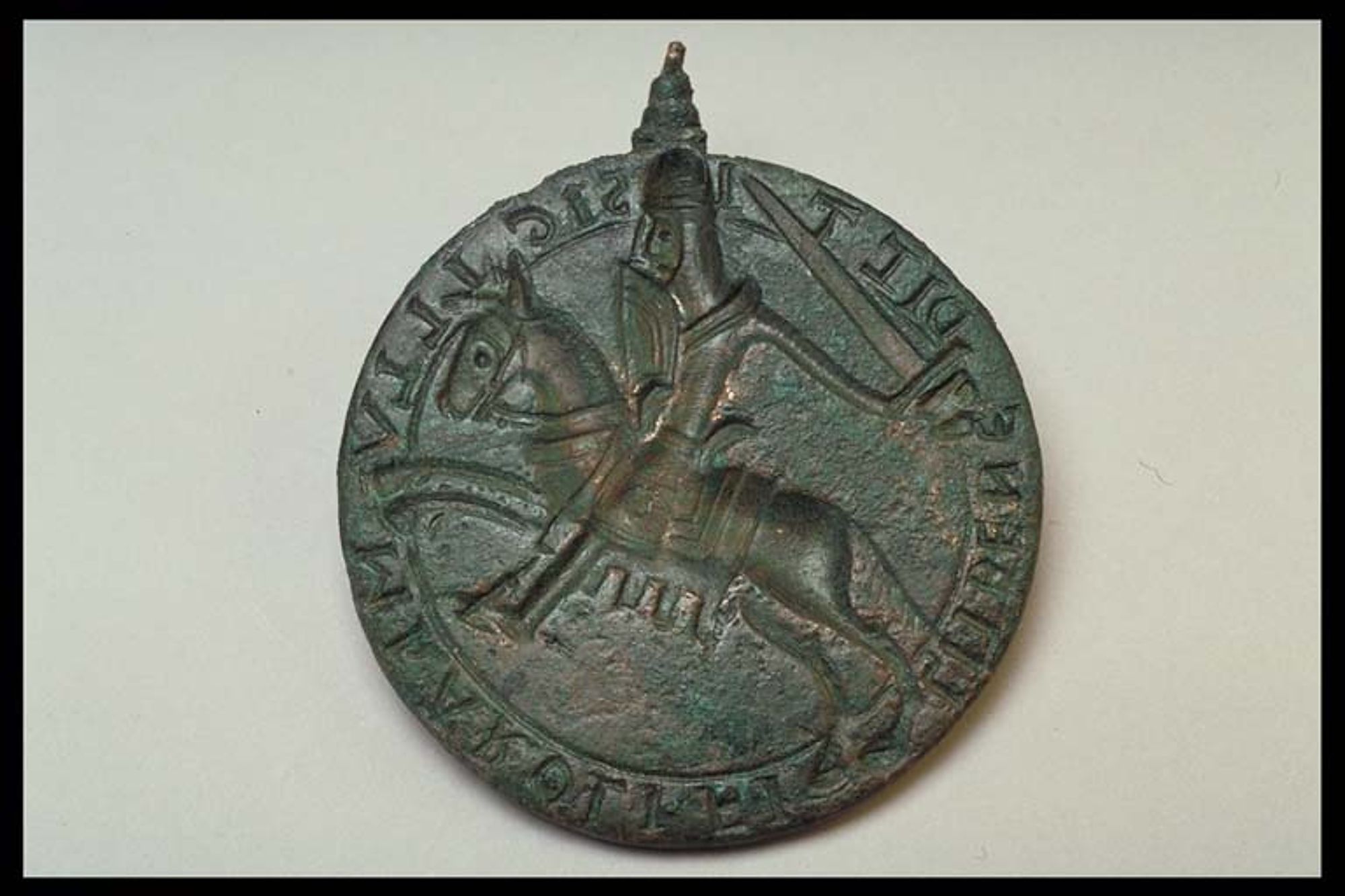
Seal of Karl the Deaf with inscription SIGILLVM KAROLI FILII BENEDICTI

Karl the Deaf (Swedish: Karl Döve; died 1220) of the House of Bjälbo (Folkungaätten) was the jarl of Sweden from 1216 to 1220.

== Biography ==
His father was magnate Bengt Snivil. He was the brother of Magnus Minnesköld and jarl Birger Brosa and father of jarl Ulf Fase. Karl died at the Battle of Lihula in Estonia on August 8, 1220.

The seal of Karl, discovered in the early 1990s, is dated to the end of the 12th century and thus the oldest preserved personal object in Swedish history. Personal seals were normally broken to pieces at the death of the owner in order to prevent later abuse, and the intact seal of Karl is therefore unique. The Swedish Museum of National Antiquities bought it in 2001 for SEK 800,000.

== Sources ==
- Lindström, Fredrik; Lindström, Henrik (2006). Svitjods undergång och Sveriges födelse (in Swedish). Albert Bonniers förlag. ISBN 978-91-0-010789-5.
- "Karl Döves sigill från 1100-talet" (in Swedish). Auktionsverket. 31 October 2001. Archived from the original on 8 October 2007.
- "Karl döves sigillstamp såld för 800.000" (in Swedish). Nättidningen Rötter. 29 November 2001.
