= Bjälbo =

- small village
- Location within Östergötland
- Coordinates: 58°22′19.49″N 15°0′26.35″E
- Country: Sweden
- municipality: Mjölby
- county: Östergötland

Area
  - Land: 25 ha (62 acres)

Population (2012-12-31)
  - Total: 65
  - Density: 257/km^{2} (670/sq mi)
- Time zone: UTC+1 (CET)
  - Summer (DST): UTC+2 (CEST)
- Postal code: 590 21
- Area code: +46 142

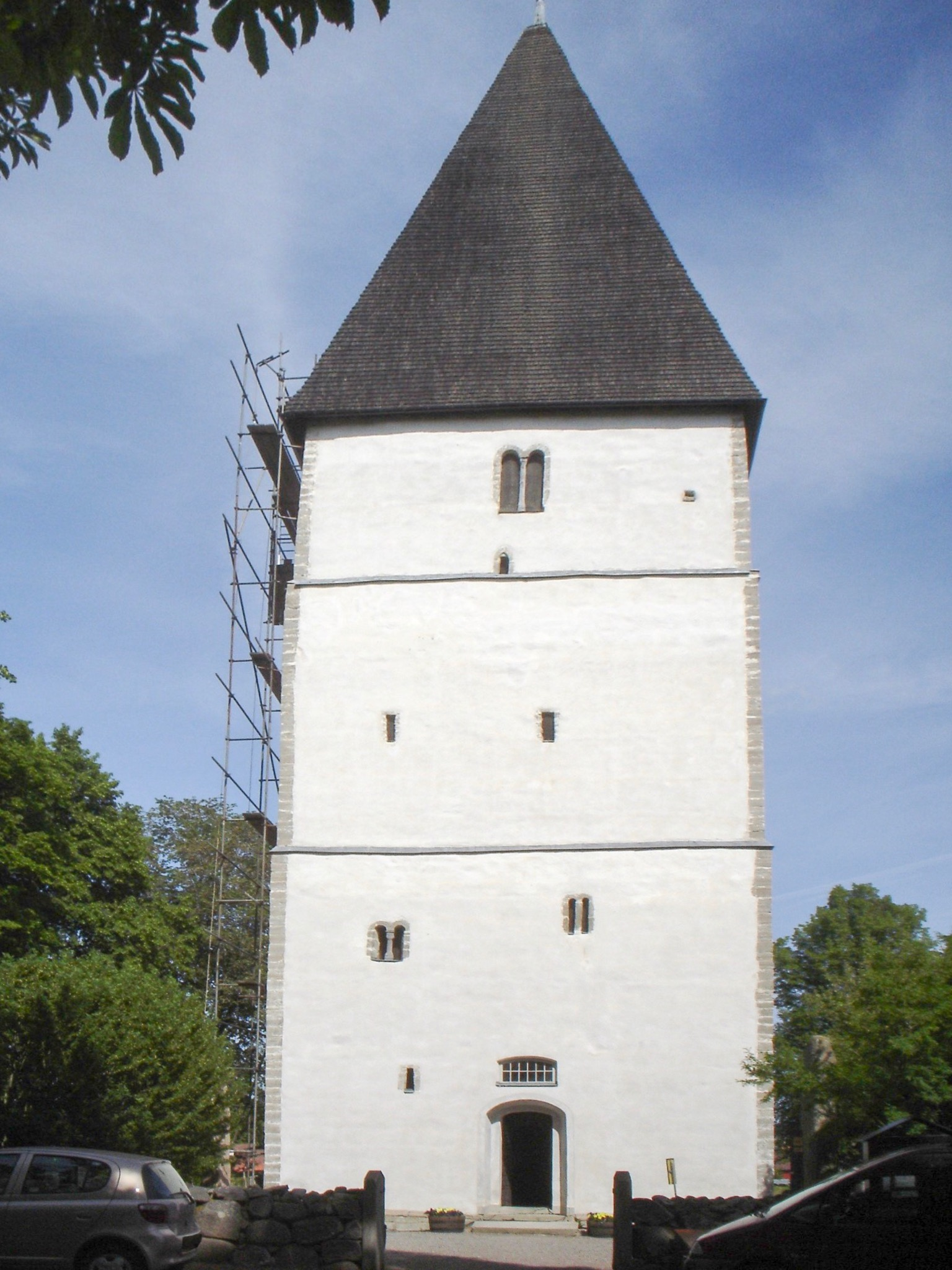
The church tower in Bjälbo from the 12th Century.

Bjälbo is a small village in Mjölby Municipality, Östergötland, Sweden.

The medieval House of Bjälbo had a church and a manor house at Bjälbo. Magnus Minnesköld was probably born here, and in around 1210 his son Birger Magnusson.

Today the church tower is preserved. The church was probably built in the first half of the twelfth century, reflecting new techniques brought by Cistercian monks from France in 1143. The surviving tower was probably added around 1220. Both structures are thought to have been projects of Ingrid Ylva, mother of Birger Jarl.

In 1173, King (or pretender) Kol Sverkerson was killed in a battle at Bjälbo.

== See also ==
- Bjälbo Runestones
