= Lawspeaker =

Scandinavian legal office

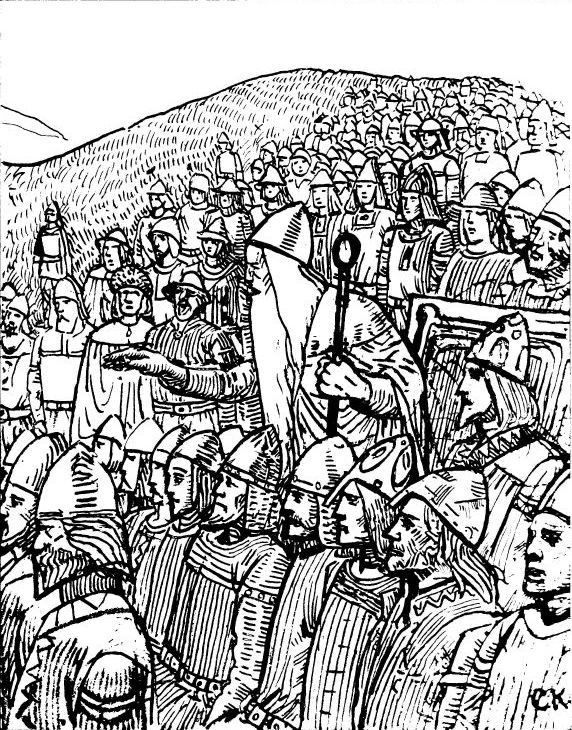
Torgny the Lawspeaker showing the power of his office to the king of Sweden at Gamla Uppsala, 1018. The lawspeaker forced king Olof Skötkonung not only to accept peace with his enemy, king Olaf the Stout of Norway, but also to give his daughter to him in marriage. Modern historians doubt this account. Illustration by C. Krohg.

A lawspeaker or lawman (Swedish: lagman, Old Swedish: laghmaþer or laghman, Danish: lovsigemand, Norwegian: lagmann, Icelandic: lög(sögu)maður [ˈlœɣ(ˌsœːɣʏ)ˌmaːðʏr̥], Faroese: løgmaður, Finnish: laamanni, Greenlandic: inatsitinuk) is a unique Scandinavian legal office. It has its basis in a common Germanic oral tradition, where wise people were asked to recite the law, but it was only in Scandinavia that the function evolved into an office. At first, lawspeakers represented the people, and their duties and authority were connected to the assemblies (things). For most of the last thousand years, however, they were part of the king's administration.

Snorri Sturluson (1179–1241) of Iceland was a famous lawspeaker. He wrote about an 11th-century lawspeaker named Torgny, but historians doubt the account.

== Sweden ==
In Sweden, this office was the most important one of regional governments, where each lagsaga (usually the same as the traditional province) was the jurisdiction of a lawspeaker who was subordinate to the lawspeaker of Tiundaland. The lawspeaker presided over the things, worked as a judge and formulated the laws that had been decided by the people. The lawspeaker was obliged to memorize the law and to recite it at the thing. He was also responsible for the administration at the thing and for the execution of the decisions, and it was his duty to safeguard the rights and liberties of the people and to speak on their behalf to the king or his representative. It was the lawspeaker who, on the behalf of the people, recognized the elected king when he passed on the Eriksgata. However, after the establishment of the province laws, c. 1350, he would participate at the Stone of Mora with twelve companions from his jurisdiction.

According to the Västgöta Law, the lawspeaker was appointed for life by the yeomen (bönder) of the province from among their number; it was also stipulated that his father should also have been a landowner. The office was not hereditary, but he was usually selected from the more powerful families.

The first named Swedish lawspeaker, if the text is correct, is the Lum recorded in a register of Västergötland lawmen copied by Laurentius Dyakn, a priest in Vidhem, in the 1320s; he must have lived around 1000. The first Swedish lawspeaker for whom we have substantial biographical information is Eskil (c. 1175–1227), the seventeenth in Laurentius's list. From the mid-13th century and onwards, the lawspeakers became more attached to the king, and it was common that lawspeakers were members of the king's council. King Magnus Eriksson decided that the king would influence the appointment of the lawspeakers. Six nobles and six yeomen would in consultation with two clergymen appoint three men from the jurisdiction among whom the king would select the one he deemed to be most fit. This procedure would be in effect until the 16th century when the whole process of selection was transferred to the king.

From then on, the lawspeakers only came from the nobility, and it had turned into a pension, in which a member of the Privy Council of Sweden was selected and received a salary, but had other people taking care of the work. This privilege was abolished during the Reduction of 1680, after which the lawspeakers were obliged to take care of the work themselves, and there were checks on the appointment of members of the privy council. Still, the appointment remained restricted to noblemen until 1723.

By then, the functions of the office had become restricted to that of a judge, a function which also became less important by time. In 1849, the office was abolished, but the title remained occasionally in use as a title of honour for governors.

In 1947, the title of lagman (pl. lagmän) was reintroduced for senior judges, namely the presidents of divisions of the courts of appeal. Since reform in 1969, presidents of the district courts (tingsrätter) are lagmän, while presidents of divisions of the courts of appeal are hovrättslagmän ("court of appeal lawspeakers"). Correspondingly, presidents of the district administrative courts (förvaltningsrätter) also carry the title of lagman and presidents of divisions of the administrative courts of appeal are kammarrättslagmän ("administrative court of appeal lawspeakers").

First known lawspeakers in each province of Sweden
Province (lagsaga)	First known lawman	Year
Uppland	Birger Persson	1296-1316
Tiundaland	Lars	1231
Tiundaland	Israel Andersson And	1286–1289
Tiundaland	Birger Persson	1293–1296
Attundaland	Germund	1231
Attundaland	Håkon	1286–1296
Fjädrundaland	?	(joined Uppland in the 1290s)
Hälsingland	?	?
Södermanland	Björn Næf	1285–1286
Södermanland	Johan Ingevaldsson	1295–1304
Västmanland and Dala	Magnus Gregersson	1305
Västmanland and Dala	Greger Magnusson	1325–1336
Närke	Filip Törnesson	1271–1279
Värmland	A. legislator in Vermlandia	1190
Värmland	Höldo	1268
Värmland	Marl Haraldsson	c. 1285
Västergötland	Eskil Magnusson (House of Bjälbo)	1217–1227
Västergötland	Gustaf	1230
Västergötland	Folke	1240
Västergötland	Peter Näf	1251–1253
Östergötland	Lars Petersson	1244
Östergötland	Magnus Bengtsson (House of Bjälbo)	1247–1263
Tiohärad (Småland)	Nils	1180
Tiohärad (Småland)	Ulf	1200
Tiohärad (Småland)	Karl Ingeborgsson	1266–1268

== Finland ==
Finland being governed by Swedish law wholly until 1809, the events were the same as in Sweden. However, the lagman offices were terminated and lagman became an honorific title only in 1868 (at that time laws were published also in Finnish and thus also the term laamanni official). In the 1993 reform, laamanni and lagman were reintroduced as the title of the chief judge of a district court or a senior judge in a court of appeal.

== Norway ==
In Norway, the lawspeakers remained counselors versed in the law until king Sverre I of Norway (1184–1202) made them into his officials. In the laws of Magnus VI of Norway (1263–1280), they were given the right to function as judges and to preside at the lagtings (the Norwegian superior courts). Modern historians regard the lawspeakers in ancient times (especially before around 1600), of which there were 10–12 in the entire kingdom, as part of the nobility. In the 14th and 15th centuries they were usually recruited from the existing higher nobility, with some holding the rank of knight, the highest rank of nobility in the kingdom. In the 16th century they were still usually recruited from the existing nobility, albeit more often from the lower nobility. Lawspeakers received fiefs. For example, Marker fief was by tradition held by the lawspeaker of Oslo. They were also treated as equal to the nobility on formal occasions.

The historical lagtings and the office of lawspeaker were abolished in 1797, but the title was reinstituted in 1887 together with the introduction of the jury system.

== Iceland ==
In Iceland, the office was introduced in 930, when the Althing was established. He was elected for three years. Besides his function as the president of the thing, his duties were restricted to counselling and to reciting the law. It was the sole government office of the medieval Icelandic Commonwealth. The lawspeaker was elected for a term of three years and was supposed to declaim the law at the Althing, a third of it each summer. In fact, Grímr Svertingsson's term was cut short, not because of incompetence or illness, but because his voice was too weak for the job. Apart from his function as a lawsayer and chairman of the court, the lǫgsǫgumaðr had no formal power, but he would often be appointed as an arbitrator in the frequently arising disputes. The office lingered on for a few years in the transitional period after 1262, after which it was replaced with a lǫgmaðr. The traditional date for the founding of the Althing is 930 with Úlfljótr appearing as a founding figure and the original author of the laws. After the union with Norway in 1264, two royal lawspeakers were appointed who had an important influence on the legal processes at the thing. The office was abolished together with the Althing in 1800.

=== List of Icelandic lawspeakers ===
Scholars are suspicious of the fact that Úlfljótur's first two successors have been assigned a period in office of exactly 20 summers each, but from Þorkell máni on, the chronology is probably correct; names are given in their modern Icelandic form.

Lögsögumaður	Term in office
Úlfljótur	c. 930
Hrafn Hængsson	930–949
Þórarinn Ragabróðir Óleifsson	950–969
Þorkell máni Þorsteinsson	970–984
Þorgeir Ljósvetningagoði Þorkelsson	985–1001
Grímur Svertingsson	1002–1003
Skafti Þóroddsson	1004–1030
Steinn Þorgestsson	1031–1033
Þorkell Tjörvason	1034–1053
Gellir Bölverksson	1054–1062
Gunnar hinn spaki Þorgrímsson	1063–1065
Kolbeinn Flosason	1066–1071
Gellir Bölverksson	1072–1074
Gunnar hinn spaki Þorgrímsson	1075
Sighvatur Surtsson	1076–1083
Markús Skeggjason	1084–1107
Úlfhéðinn Gunnarsson	1108–1116
Bergþór Hrafnsson	1117–1122
Guðmundur Þorgeirsson	1123–1134
Hrafn Úlfhéðinsson	1135–1138
Finnur Hallsson	1139–1145
Gunnar Úlfhéðinsson	1146–1155
Snorri Húnbogason	1156–1170
Styrkár Oddason	1171–1180
Gissur Hallsson	1181–1202
Hallur Gissurarson	1203–1209
Styrmir hinn fróði Kárason	1210–1214
Snorri Sturluson	1215–1218
Teitur Þorvaldsson	1219–1221
Snorri Sturluson	1222–1231
Styrmir hinn fróði Kárason	1232–1235
Teitur Þorvaldsson	1236–1247
Ólafr hvítaskáld Þórðarson	1248–1250
Sturla Þórðarson	1251
Ólafr hvítaskáld Þórðarson	1252
Teitur Einarsson	1253–1258
Ketill Þorláksson	1259–1262
Þorleifur hreimur Ketilsson	1263–1265
Sigurður Þorvaldsson	1266
Jón Einarsson	1267
Þorleifur hreimur Ketilsson	1268
Jón Einarsson	1269–1270
Þorleifur hreimur Ketilsson	1271

== See also ==
- Asega (lawspeaker of medieval western Friesland)
- Brehon
- Medieval Scandinavian law
