= Karl Magnusson =

Bishop of Linköping 1216–1220

Karl Magnusson (died 1220) was the Bishop of Linköping during 1216–1220.

Karl Magnusson was from the Bjälbo dynasty or House of Folkung (Folkungaätten) and was a brother of Birger Magnusson (Birger Jarl), the most powerful man of Sweden in the mid-13th century. His father was Magnus Minnessköld (1180s-1208), and his mother was likely Ingrid Ylva (1180s-1250-1255). He died at the Battle of Lihula in Estonia.

== See also ==
- Eskil Magnusson
