= Knut Birgersson =

Knut Birgersson (Old Norse: Knútr jarl Birgisson; died 1208) was Riksjarl of Sweden. He was the eldest surviving son of Riksjarl Birger Brosa and a member of the powerful House of Bjälbo (Folkungaätten).

== Biography ==
Knut Birgersson was apparently elevated to the office of Riksjarl during the last years of the reign of King Sverker II of Sweden. This was despite the fact that Sverker had named his infant son Johan Sverkersson (c. 1201 – 1222) as riksjarl following the death of Jarl Birger Brosa. Johan Sverkersson was the nephew of Knut Birgersson, being born of his sister Ingegärd.

According to one source, Jarl Knut was married to Sigrid, daughter of King Knut Eriksson. The same source states that Knut's son Magnus Broka was born of Sigrid. Knut Birgersson was killed in 1208 at the Battle of Lena, where King Sverker lost his throne to the new king Erik Knutsson, the only remaining son of King Knut.

== Other sources ==
- Harrison, Dick (2002) Jarlens sekel (Ordfront förlag, Stockholm) ISBN 91-7324-999-8
