= Lagting =

Lagting, literally "Law Ting", can refer to:

- Lagting, the Parliament of Åland
- Lagting (Norway), the quasi-upper house of the Parliament of Norway from 1814 to 2009
- Løgting, the parliament of the Faroe Islands
