= Ingegerd Knutsdatter =

Danish princess, daughter of King Canute IV

- Born: c. 1080–1085
- Spouse: Folke the Fat
- Issue: Bengt Snivil
- House: Estridsen
- Father: Canute IV of Denmark
- Mother: Adela of Flanders

Ingegerd Knutsdatter of Denmark (also called Ingerta and Ingerd; born between 1080 and 1085 – year of death unknown), was a Danish princess, daughter of King Canute IV of Denmark and Queen Adela. She is regarded as the founding mother of the House of Bjälbo of subsequent Swedish and Norwegian kings (beginning with two great-great-grandsons).

At the deposition and murder of her father in 1086, her mother left Denmark and returned to Flanders with her son Charles, while Ingegerd and her sister Cecilia Knutsdatter followed their paternal uncle Eric I of Denmark and Boedil Thurgotsdatter, who became their foster parents, to Sweden. Both sisters married Swedish aristocrats: Cæcilia married Jarl Eric, and Ingegerd married Folke the Fat and became the mother of Bengt Snivil. It is known that both of these marriages took place in Sweden.

Eric and Boedil returned to Denmark when Eric became monarch in 1095. Her sister Cecilia later returned to Denmark, but nothing suggests that Ingegerd did the same.

== Sources ==
- Line, Philip (2007). Kingship and State Formation in Sweden: 1130 - 1290. Brill.
