= Eskil Magnusson =

Swedish nobleman (c. 1175 – c. 1227)

- Born: c. 1175
- Died: c. 1227
- Noble family: Bjälbo
- Spouse: Kristina Nilsdotter
- Father: Magnus Minniskiöld
- Occupation: Lawspeaker

Eskil Magnusson (c. 1175 – c. 1227) was a nobleman and lawspeaker (Lagman) of Västergötland. He is the first attested legal official in what is now Sweden about whom extensive information is available.

== Biography ==
He was a member of the Bjälbo dynasty or House of Folkung (Folkungaätten) which in the 1250s became Sweden's royal dynasty. He was the son of Magnus Minniskiöld, and the elder half-brother of Birger Jarl (Birger Magnusson), the most powerful man of Sweden in the middle of the 13th century.

Around 1217, he married Kristina Nilsdotter, widow of the Norwegian earl Hakon the Mad (Håkon Galen), whose son Knut Håkonsson was a pretender to the Norwegian throne. Due to the location of his jurisdiction and his marriage to Kristina, Eskil had good contacts in Norway and may have functioned as a negotiator between the Swedish and the Norwegian monarchs. Some time during 1218–1220, he was visited by Icelandic historian Snorri Sturluson.

Eskil was noted for his learning and seems to have had an important role in codifying the law of Västergötland, (Västgötalagen) the oldest known Swedish text written in the Latin script. The list of lawspeakers of Västergötland appended to Västgötalagen tells that he collected and edited the province's laws, and administered justice with great consideration. He had good judgment, the learning of a cleric and he was superior to all the chieftains of the kingdom. The list also claims that he distinguished himself in bravery and that it would take a long time until another man of that kind was born.

== Related reading ==
- Wiktorsson, Per-Axel (2011) Äldre Västgötalagen och dess bilagor (Skara: Föreningen för Västgötalitteratur) ISBN 978-91-978079-2-0
