= Johan Sverkersson =

King of Sweden from 1216 to 1222

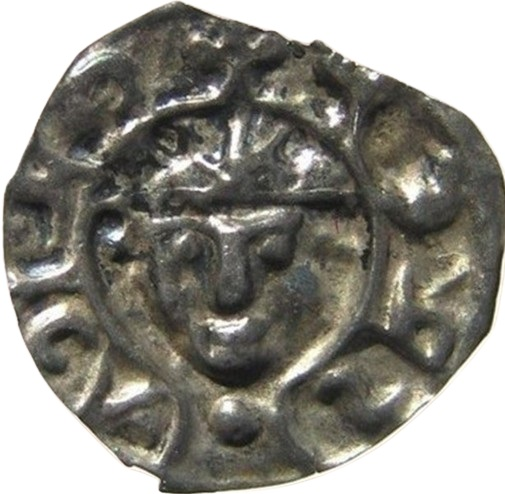
- Coin issued by Johan Sverkersson

King of Sweden
- Reign: 1216 – 10 March 1222
- Predecessor: Erik Knutsson
- Successor: Erik Eriksson
- Born: c. 1201
- Died: 10 March 1222; Visingsö, Sweden
- House: Sverker
- Father: Sverker II of Sweden
- Mother: Ingegerd Birgersdotter

Johan Sverkersson (c. 1201 – 10 March 1222), also known as John I, was King of Sweden from 1216 until his death in 1222. He was the last king from the House of Sverker, leaving no heirs. During his reign, an expedition was launched from Sweden against the Estonians, with disastrous results.

== Background ==
Johan was the son of King Sverker II of Sweden of the House of Sverker and Queen Ingegerd of the Bjälbo dynasty. When he was one year old, his maternal grandfather Jarl Birger Brosa died. King Sverker appointed his son as nominal jarl in order to strengthen his own ruling powers and secure the increasingly important jarl institution. This enraged the rival House of Erik as well as some of Birger Brosa's offspring, and Johan was contemptuously known as the "breech-less jarl". Johan retained his dignity until his father King Sverker was beaten in the Battle of Lena in 1208 and exiled to Denmark, while his rival Erik Knutsson, from the House of Erik, became King of Sweden. Sverker II tried to recapture the throne, but was killed in the Battle of Gestilren in 1210.

== Reign ==
When King Erik Knutsson died suddenly in fever in 1216, the teen-aged Johan was hailed king by the Swedish aristocracy against the will of the Pope in Rome. The Danish King Valdemar Sejr also opposed the choice, since the posthumous son of Erik Knutsson was a nephew of his. In Sweden itself the succession did not take place without strife. The Church had a big stake in the appointment, and it is apparent that Johan had a number of church leaders at his side, including Archbishop Valerius, Bishop Bengt of Skara and Bishop Karl of Linköping. The last-mentioned was termed chancellor; this is the first time that the title occurs in Sweden. The young ruler was crowned in 1219 and immediately issued a charter of privileges to the Swedish bishops. The charter confirmed the privileges that his father Sverker II had issued in 1200, but expanded them. The properties of the church were to be free from royal revenue demands, and fines paid by tenants of the Church would go to the bishops. He also granted several royal farms to various clergymen.

== Expedition to Estonia ==
During the brief reign of King Johan, a Swedish presence was established in Estonia. The background to this is the activities of the German Order of the Sword Brothers and the Danish King Valdemar Sejr in the still pagan Baltic region. The Swedish aristocracy wished to share the spoils, and an expedition was equipped. King Johan himself, his cousin, Jarl Karl Döve (the brother of Birger Brosa), and his chancellor, Bishop Karl Magnusson led the fleet to Rotalia in Estonia in 1220. The enterprise was initially successful and King Johan established a base in Leal (Lihula). From this stronghold the Swedish soldiers made forays to the countryside, built churches and forced the locals to accept baptism. The king then returned home. However, the expedition ended in disaster. The inhabitants of Ösel assaulted the Swedish base in the Battle of Lihula on 8 August 1220. Bishop Karl and Jarl Karl Döve fell together with almost all the Swedish defenders. The devastating defeat left no Swedish presence and discouraged the Swedish expansion to Estonia for more than 300 years. The events were described in the Livonian Chronicle of Henry and the Livonian Rhymed Chronicle.

== Death and succession ==
King Johan remained on the throne until his death on 10 March 1222. He died unmarried and childless, and left a favourable memory in Swedish historiography: "He was young of years and very gentle. He was king for three winters and died of illness on Visingsö. All of Sweden deeply mourned his death, that he was not allowed a longer life. And he rests in Alvastra, and God may preserve his soul in eternity". In the same year 1222, the rival dynasty's young heir Erik Eriksson ascended the throne at the age of 6.

== Literature ==
- Harrison, Dick, Jarlens sekel. En berättelse om 1200-talets Sverige. Stockholm: Ordfront, 2002 (ISBN 91-7324-999-8).
- Tunberg, Sven, Sveriges historia till våra dagar. Andra delen: Äldre medeltiden. Stockholm: P.A. Norstedt & Söners Förlag, 1926.

Johan Sverkersson House of Sverker Born: 1201 Died: 10 March 1222
Regnal titles
Preceded by Erik Knutsson	King of Sweden; 1216–1222	Succeeded by Erik Eriksson
