= Battle of Lihula =

1220 battle of the Northern Crusades

- Part of the Livonian Crusade
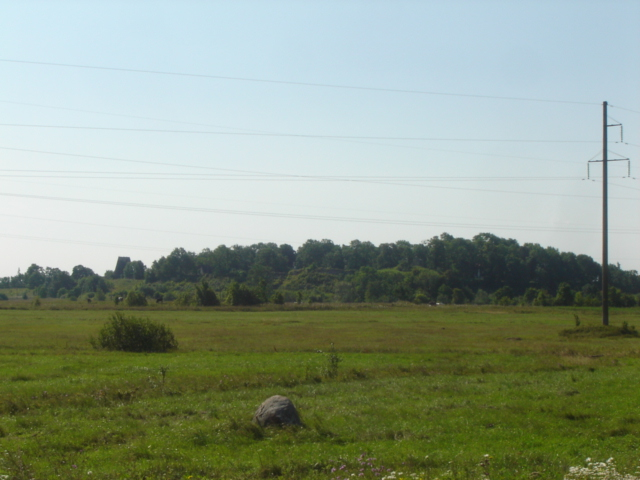
- Lihula hilltop
Date	8 August 1220
Location	Lihula, Estonia 58°41′40″N 23°50′22″E
Result	Estonian victory

Belligerents
Oeselians; Rotalians	Sweden

Commanders and leaders
Unknown	Karl the Deaf †; Karl Magnusson †

Strength
Unknown	500 men

Casualties and losses
Unknown	Entire garrison slain

The Battle of Lihula or Battle of Leal was fought between invading Swedes and Estonians for the control of a castle in Lihula, Estonia in 1220. The exact date remains uncertain, though some historians suggest that the battle took place on August 8. The event is described in the Chronicle of Henry of Livonia and the Livonian Rhymed Chronicle.

== History ==
Swedish troops, initially led by King John, had earlier in 1220 invaded the western coast of Estonia, an area not yet conquered by the Sword Brethren. The Swedish army took the Lihula stronghold and set up a small garrison. Swedish jarl Karl the Deaf and bishop Karl Magnusson of Linköping, both from the powerful House of Bjälbo, also remained in the castle.

On 8 August a combined Oeselian and Rotalian army encircled the castle at dawn. The castle was set ablaze in the course of the fierce battle that ensued. Swedish troops tried to make their way out, but they were killed on site except for a few soldiers that succeeded in escaping to Tallinn, which was held by Denmark. The jarl, the bishop, and almost 500 other Swedes were killed, leaving no Swedish presence in Estonia at all.

The short-lived Swedish attempt to gain foothold in Estonia was motivated by the quickly advancing Danish and German crusaders who had been able to conquer most of the area in the early 13th century. Defeat in the Battle of Lihula discouraged the Swedish expansion to Estonia for more than 300 years, and the country was left for the Sword Brethren, German bishops and Denmark to divide. In the meantime, Sweden focused on Finland and the permanent conflict with Novgorod. It was not until 1561 that Sweden succeeded in establishing its rule in Estonia.

== See also ==
- Livonian Crusade
- Battle of the Neva
- Second Swedish Crusade

== Sources ==
- Eesti Ajalugu I-II. 1997. History of Estonia, AS BIT 2000, 2002. ISBN 9985-2-0606-1.

=== Primary sources ===
- Chronicle of Henry of Livonia
- Livonian Rhymed Chronicle
