= Sune Sik =

Swedish prince

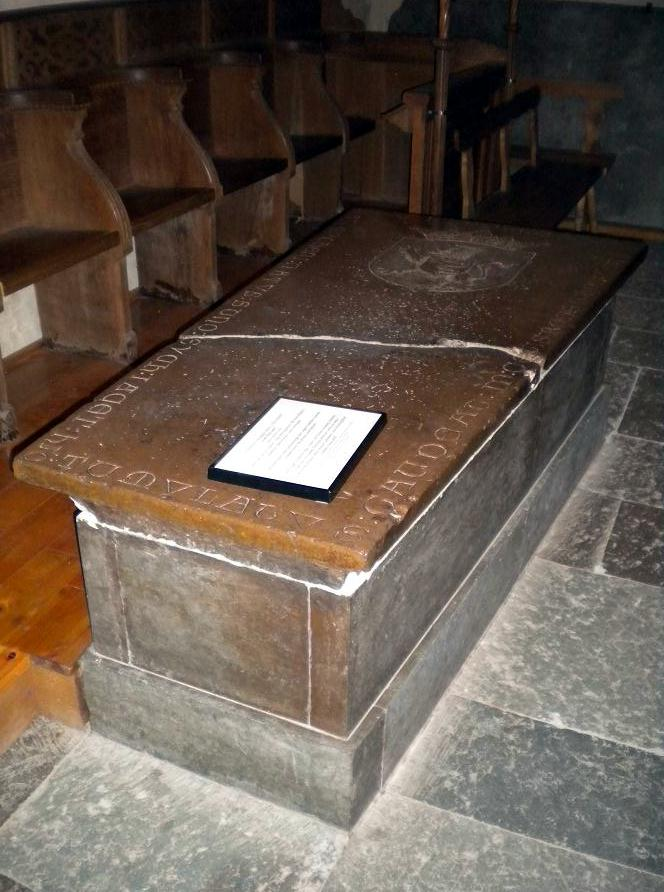
16th century grave monument for Sune Sik at Vreta Abbey

Sune Sik (born c. 1154) was allegedly a Swedish prince. According to Olaus Petri, he would have been a younger son of King Sverker I of Sweden and father of Ingrid Ylva. In surviving contemporary documents one Sune Sik can be found who lived much later. That Sune Sik made a donation to Vreta Abbey as late as in 1297. He might have ordered a restoration of a chapel in which he eventually was interred, and later Cistercian tradition may then have turned him into a prince. This has caused some historians to view Olaus Petri's account of him as unreliable.

Sune Sik, as a son of King Sverker, is counted by other Swedish historians as a person of history and the man buried at Vreta (see photo). According to 18th-century Swedish Master of Philosophy Magnus Boræn, Sune was also Duke of Östergötland (at a time when the use of such a title is not known in Sweden).
