= Birger Brosa =

Swedish jarl (died 1202)

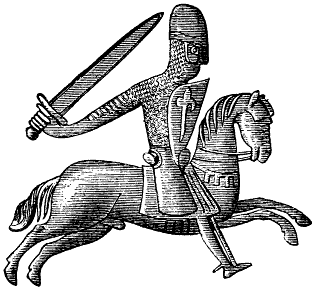
Birger Brosa's seal

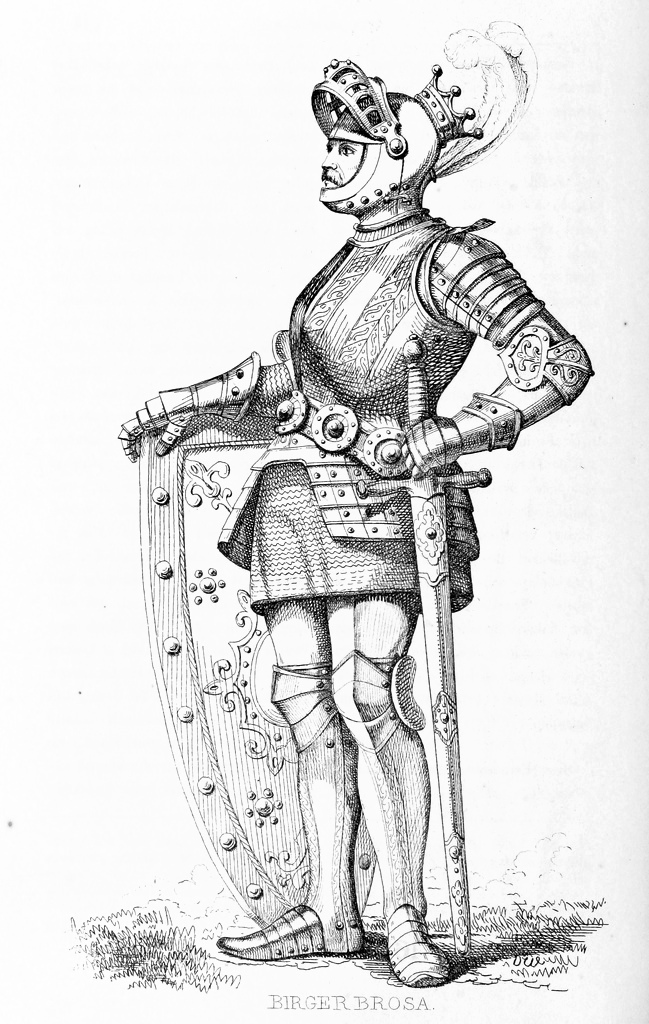
19th-century illustration of Birger Brosa from Den Skandinaviska Nordens Historia (1850).

Birger Brosa (Old Norse: Birgir Brósa; died 9 January 1202) was the jarl of Sweden from 1174 to 1202. A member of the House of Bjälbo, he served under Kings Knut Eriksson and Sverker II and was one of the most powerful political figures in Sweden during the late 12th century. He is credited with helping maintain political stability during a period of dynastic rivalry and played an influential role in Scandinavian politics, particularly through his connections with the Norwegian royal family.

== Biography ==
He was a son of Bengt Snivil and a member of the powerful House of Bjälbo. In medieval texts, he is either called the jarl of the Swedes or the jarl of the Swedes and the Geats. In Latin, the title of dux sveorum et guttorum ("duke of Swedes and Geats") was used. Birger was appointed to the position of jarl during the reign of Knut Eriksson. He maintained the position during Knut's successor Sverker II until his death in 1202.

Before 1170, Birger was married to Brigida Haraldsdotter, the daughter of Norwegian King Harald Gille. She had formerly been married to the Danish pretender Magnus Henriksson, who had briefly ruled in Uppsala in 1160–1161.

Birger appears to have maintained peace in Sweden during the civil wars that ravaged Denmark and Norway. Birger Brosa and his nephew Birger Jarl were among the most powerful figures in Sweden during their respective lifetimes. Brosa played an important role in maintaining political stability during dynastic conflicts, while the office of jarl contributed significantly to the unification of the Swedish kingdom. He also participated in military campaigns in the eastern Baltic region and concluded trade agreements with Lübeck.

Many of the pretenders in Denmark and Norway sought refuge with Birger. Among them were the Birkebeiner chieftains Eystein Meyla and Sverre Sigurdsson, who were kinsmen of Brigida Haraldsdotter. Birger's son Philippus was in the service of King Sverre and died as his jarl in 1200.

Birger owned estates in Östergötland, Närke, Värmland and Södermanland. He was a major donor to Riseberga Abbey in Närke, where his widow Brigida spent her final years after his death. Following Birger's death in 1202, civil war broke out in Sweden.

== Children ==
- Philippus Birgersson (d. 1200), Jarl of Norway under King Sverre.
- Knut Birgersson, Jarl of Sweden, killed at the Battle of Lena (1208) or the Battle of Gestilren (1210).
- Folke Birgersson, Jarl of Sweden, killed at the Battle of Gestilren in 1210.
- Magnus Birgersson.
- Ingegerd Birgersdotter, married King Sverker II and was the mother of King John I of Sweden.
- Kristina Birgersdotter.
- Margareta Birgersdotter.
