= Jarl =

Norse title of nobility

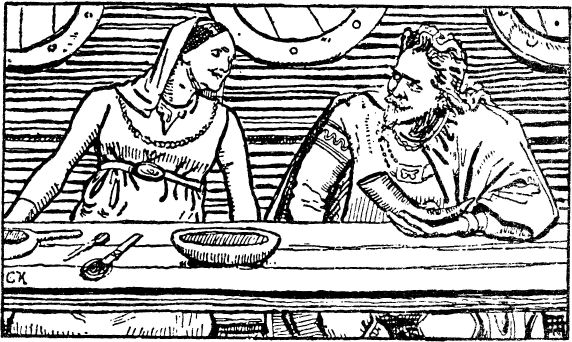
Illustration by Christian Krohg for Håkon jarls saga in Heimskringla (1899 edition), depicting Jarl Haakon and Gunnhild.

Jarl (Note: also spelled Earl in English literature) (English: /jɑːrl/) was a rank of the nobility in Scandinavia during the Viking Age and Early Middle Ages. The institution evolved over time and varied by region. In Old Norse, it meant "chieftain", specifically one appointed to rule a territory in a king's stead. It could also denote a sovereign prince. For example: During the Viking age the rulers of several of the petty kingdoms of Norway held the title of jarl, often wielding no less power than their neighboring kings. In later medieval Sweden and Norway there was typically only one jarl in the kingdom, second in authority only to the king. The title became obsolete in the Middle Ages and was replaced by the rank of duke (hertig/hertug/hertog). The word is etymologically related to the English earl.

== Etymology ==
The term jarl (Old Norse: jarl, Old Swedish: iarl, iærl, Old Danish: jærl) has been connected to various similar words across Germanic languages, such as Proto-Norse eril, Old English eorl (meaning warrior, hero, or chieftain, related to modern English earl), Old Saxon erl (man, nobleman), and Old High German erl- in personal names such as Erlaberaht.

Some scholars have suggested that jarl shares a connection with the Old Germanic erilaz and the Latin heruli or erular, terms that once referred to a Germanic tribe who, according to some scholars, once lived on Danish islands and the Skåne region (see Heruli). However, this connection has been dismissed by others.

== Norway ==
The word jarl is known in Norway from the scaldic poem Háleygjatal, dating from the late 9th century.

In Eddic poetry, a jarl is often a free man of good standing, but not necessarily of high office. The concept of the jarl also appears in the poem Rígsþula. According to the myth, the god Ríg fathers three sons—Thrall, Karl, and Jarl—who become the ancestors of the social classes: thralls, peasants, and the warrior nobility. Jarl marries Erna, daughter of hersir (local chieftain), and their youngest son is named Konr or Konr ungr (king). Based on Rígsþula, German historian Konrad Maurer traced the concept of jarl back to the legendary Norwegian king Harald Fairhair (c. 850 – c. 932). During those times, jarl would have meant a member of the aristocratic class. This is supported by Old English laws, in which eorl refers to a noble person. However, some scholars date the composition of Rígsþula to 12th century or later, in which case it cannot be considered a good source for a 10th century concept.

During the Merovingian period, jarl developed into an office of independent chieftains. According to the Saga of Harald Fairhair, King Harald set a jarl in each county to collect taxes:

King Haraldr made this law everywhere he established his dominion over, that he took possession of all inherited property and made all farmers pay him land dues, both rich and poor. He set a jarl in every district who was to administer the laws of the land and collect fines and land dues, and the jarl was to have one third of the taxes and dues for his maintenance and expenses. Each jarl was to have under him four or more lords [hersir] and each of them was to have revenues of twenty marks. Each jarl was to provide the king with sixty fighting men for his army, and each lord twenty men. And so much had King Haraldr increased the taxation and land dues that his jarls had more power than kings had had in the past. And then, when this was learned in Þrándheimr, many of the ruling class went to see King Haraldr and became his men.

— Haralds saga ins hárfagra, Chapter 6 [translation by Alison Finlay and Anthony Faulkes]

The most powerful of the Norwegian jarls were the jarls of Lade who ruled over Trøndelag and Hålogaland.

In later medieval Norway, the title of jarl was the highest rank below the king. There was usually no more than one jarl in mainland Norway at any one time, and sometimes none. The ruler of the Norwegian dependency of Orkney held the title of jarl, and after Iceland had acknowledged Norwegian overlordship in 1261, a jarl was sent there, as well, as the king's high representative. In mainland Norway, the title of jarl was usually used for one of two purposes:

- To appoint a de facto ruler in cases where the king was a minor or seriously ill (e.g. Håkon Galen in 1204 during the minority of king Guttorm, Skule Bårdsson in 1217 during the illness of king Inge Bårdsson).
- To appease a pretender to the throne without giving him the title of king (e.g. Eirik, the brother of king Sverre).

In 1237, jarl Skule Bårdsson was given the rank of duke (hertug). This was the first time this title had been used in Norway, and meant that the title jarl was no longer the highest rank below the king. It also heralded the introduction of new noble titles from continental Europe, which were to replace the old Norse titles. The last jarl in mainland Norway was appointed in 1295.

== Sweden ==
The usage of the title in Sweden was similar to Norway's. In Swedish history, jarls are described as either local rulers or viceroys appointed by a king, ruling one of the historical Swedish provinces, such as Västergötland, Östergötland, or Svitjod. For special occasions, regional jarls outside of Sweden could be nominated as well. An example of this is Jon Jarl, who allegedly conducted pirate operations against Novgorod in the east.

The sveajarls of 12th and 13th centuries were powerful men, such as Birger Brosa, Ulf Fase, and Birger Jarl (Magnusson), and often the true rulers of the Swedish kingdom. After the death of Birger Jarl, the title was replaced by that of a duke (Swedish: hertig) in the 13th century. The first duke was Birger Jarl's son Magnus (later known as Ladulås).

=== Jarls of Sweden ===
- Birger Brosa (died 1202), jarl in 1174–1202
- Johan Sverkersson (c. 1201 – 1222), appointed jarl in 1202 at the age of one
- Jon Jarl (died c. 1206), mentioned in Erik's Chronicle
- Knut Birgersson (died 1208), jarl to Sverker the Younger, killed at the Battle of Lena
- Folke Birgersson, 1208–1210, killed in 1210 at the Battle of Gestilren
- Karl the Deaf (Karl Döve; died 1220), killed at the Battle of Lihula
- Ulf Fase (died 1247), jarl from c. 1220 and possibly until his death
- Birger Magnusson (c. 1210 – 1266), jarl in 1248–1266

=== Regional jarls of Västergötland ===
- Ulf Tostesson
- Ragnvald Ulfsson (c. 1010–20), later jarl of Staraja Ladoga and Ingria. Father of king Stenkil of Sweden.

== Denmark ==
In Denmark the jarl was the king's deputy, as Ulf Jarl (died in 1026) was to Canute the Great, king of England, Denmark and Norway.

The last jarl of Southern Jutland, Canute Lavard (died in 1131), became the first Danish hertug (duke), with the title "Hertug af Slesvig" ("Duke of Schleswig"). Thus the title hertug (duke) came to replace the old Norse title jarl.

== Iceland ==
Only one person is known to have ever held the title of Jarl in Iceland. This was Gissur Þorvaldsson, who was made Jarl of Iceland in 1258 by King Haakon IV of Norway to aid his efforts in bringing Iceland under Norwegian kingship during the Age of the Sturlungs. He held the title until his death in 1268.

== England ==
When Canute became the king of England in 1016, one of his first acts was to reshape the kingdom into the system that was used in Scandinavia. He divided the kingdom into four semi-independent earldoms, Northumbria went to the Norwegian, Erik of Lade, Thorkell the Tall was given East Anglia, and Eadric Streona had his preexisting appointment to Mercia confirmed. Canute reserved Wessex for himself.

== In popular culture ==
- In the History Channel's historical drama television series Vikings, actor Thorbjørn Harr plays the character of Jarl Borg, a Jarl of Götaland.
- In the video game The Elder Scrolls V: Skyrim, the rulers of the various cities and their respective regions, called within the game as the nine holds, are known as Jarls.
- In the NRK television series Norsemen, there are two jarls: Jarl Varg, the primary antagonist of the show, and Jarl Bjorn, a character in Season 3.
- In the Paradox Crusader Kings video game series, players can role play as rulers within the Norse culture and attain the rank of Jarl, equivalent to a Duke.
