= House of Bjälbo =

Extinct Swedish noble family

House of Bjälbo Bjälboätten House of Folkung Folkungaätten
- Scandinavian royal house
- Arms of Birger Jarl
- Country: Kingdom of Sweden; Kingdom of Norway; Kingdom of Denmark
- Founded: 12th century
- Founder: Folke the Fat
- Current head: None; extinct
- Final ruler: Olaf II of Denmark
- Titles: King of Sweden; King of Norway; King of Denmark; Jarl of Sweden; Duke of Finland
- Dissolution: between 1388; 638 years ago and 1396; 630 years ago

The House of Bjälbo (Note: Pronounced /biˈɛlboʊ/ bee-EL-boh, and sometimes spelled Bjelbo.), also known as the House of Folkung (Note: Swedish pronunciation: [ˈfɔ̂lːkɵŋ]) (Swedish: Bjälboätten or Folkungaätten), was a Swedish family that produced several medieval bishops, jarls and kings of Sweden. It also provided three kings of Norway and one king of Denmark in the 14th century.

== Name and origin ==
The house has been known as the "House of Folkung" since the 17th century, and this name is still commonly used in Swedish works of reference. The name "Folkung" does appear as early as in 12th century sources, but is then usually not applied to members of the family.

In an effort to avoid confusion with the Folkunge Party some modern historians have argued that "House of Bjälbo" would be a better name because Birger Jarl lived there and it is the family's oldest known manor. Bjälbo is located in Östergötland, outside of Skänninge in the present-day municipality of Mjölby. In any case the members of this dynasty never used a name to refer to themselves since family names were not widely adopted in Sweden until the 16th century, thus neither name is more "correct" for the dynasty, apart from the potential for confusion.

== Jarls and bishops ==
The House of Bjälbo produced most of the jarls in Sweden in the 11th, 12th and 13th centuries until the title was abolished in 1266. Different branches of the family were often rivals for the office of jarl. Most of the kings during that time were also from Östergötland.

Around 1100, Folke the Fat became the first known Bjälbo jarl, and probably the first jarl of all Sweden, under king Inge I of Sweden. He was married to Ingegerd Knutsdatter, daughter of king Canute IV of Denmark. According to legends, he was the first of his family so elevated. Nothing is known of any of Folke's collateral relatives, though it is well-established that several of his sons' descendants were important lords.

Other notable jarls from the family were Birger Brosa, Karl the Deaf, Ulf Fase, and Birger Jarl. In the early 13th century, some members of the family moved to Norway, and held the office of jarl there. Noteworthy is that regardless of the ruling royal family, Bjälbos continued to hold the position of the jarl in the kingdom.

Several members of the family were also Bishops of Linköping at least in the 13th century. Diocese covered the area of Östergötland. Bishop of Linköping was often involved in the eastern activities.

Early Dukes of Finland were from the House of Bjälbo and used the traditional coat of arms with a rampant lion. This developed later to the current coat of arms of Finland during the reign of Johan as Grand Duke of Finland, the lion from which serves as the symbol of the state and in stylized forms various authorities.

== Rise to royalty ==
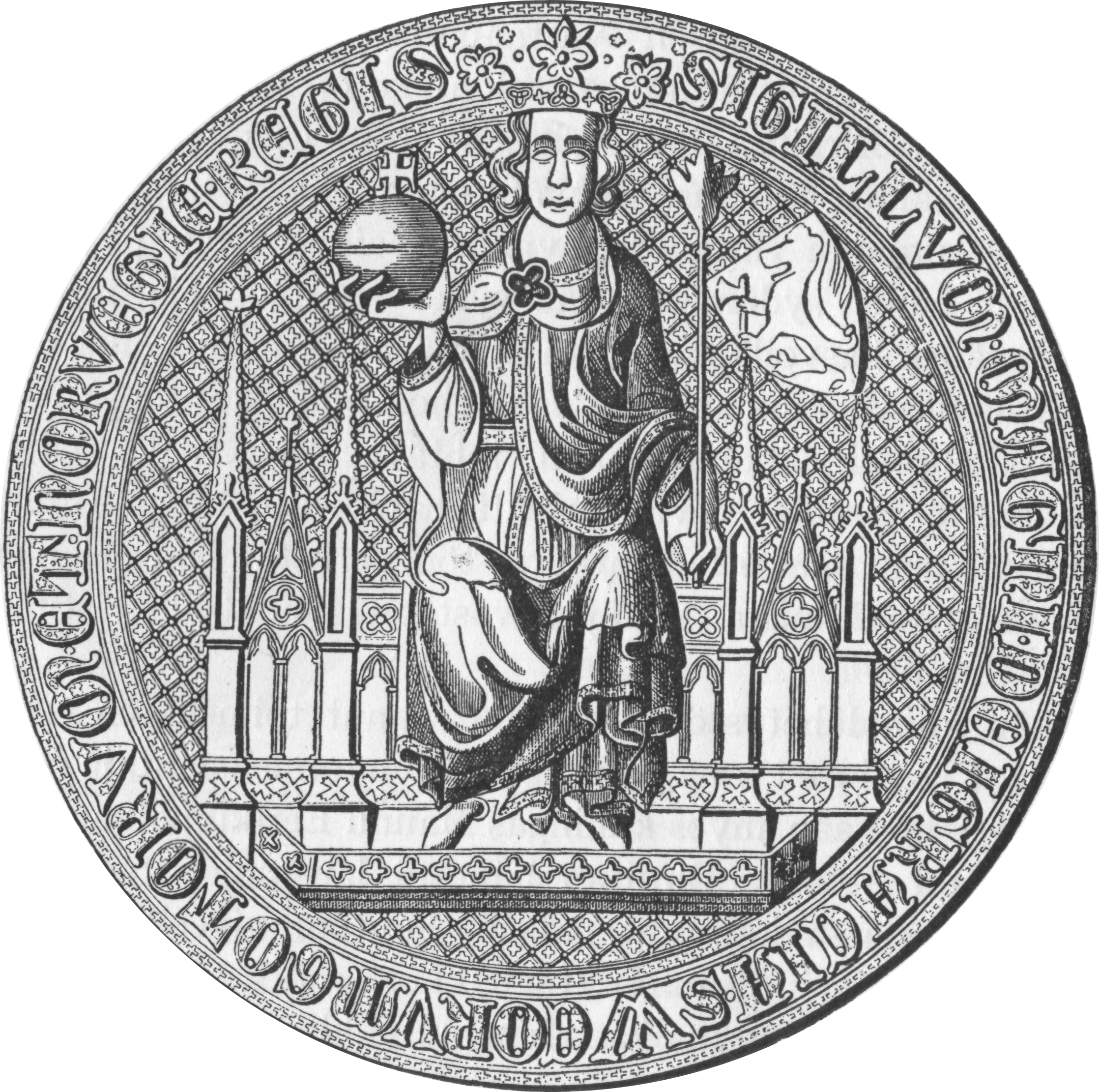
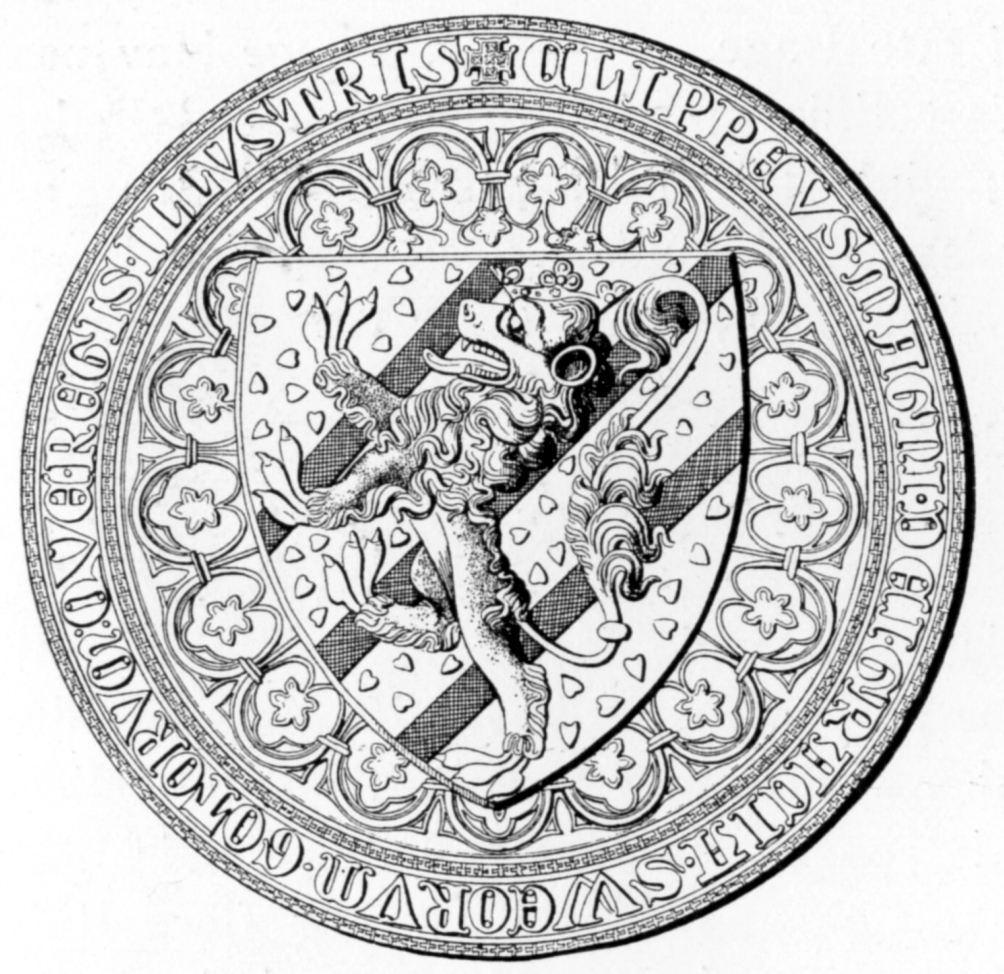
Seal of Magnus IV of Sweden, showing the obverse (left) and reverse (right).
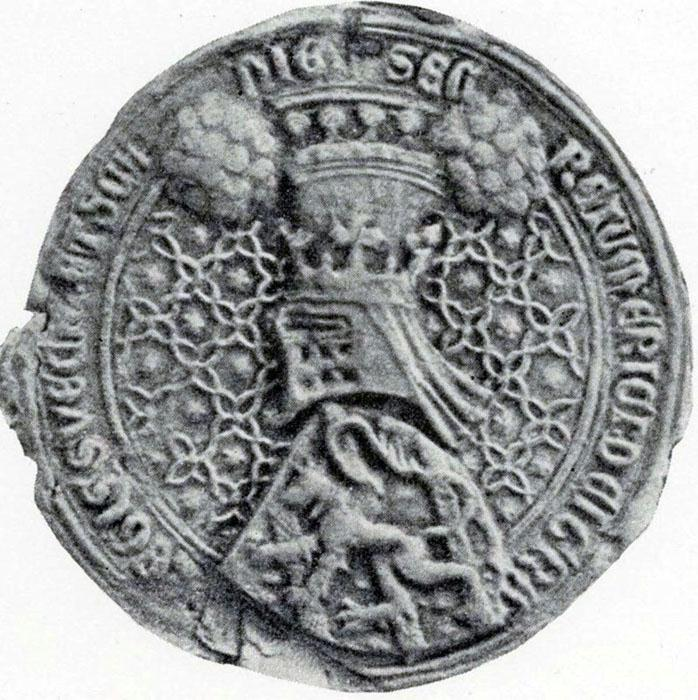
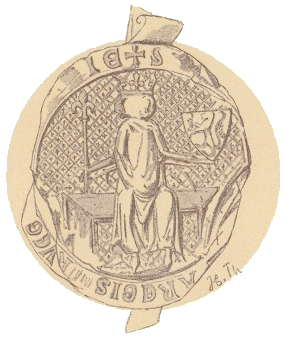
Seals of Magnus IV's sons Eric XII of Sweden (left) and Haakon VI of Norway (right).

Valdemar, a son of Birger Jarl, was elected King of Sweden in 1250. Members of the House of Bjälbo had married into the rival Swedish royal dynasties, eventually producing an heir related to them all. When the previous king, Eric XI, died without an heir apparent, his sister's son Valdemar, who was also Birger's son, emerged as the most suitable candidate for the throne. Valdemar was deposed by his brother Magnus Ladulås in 1275, from whom the subsequent royal line of the house descended.

Members of the house reigned as kings of Sweden until 1364 and as kings of Norway from 1319 to 1387. The last reigning monarch of the House of Bjälbo was Olaf II, king of Denmark and Norway, who died in 1387. The last male member of the house, descended from the deposed Valdemar, died a few years later. Although the dynasty ceased to rule Scandinavia in the 14th century, its descendants continued through female lines. Euphemia of Sweden, a granddaughter of King Magnus III, was an ancestor of Christian I of Denmark, from whom the later Oldenburg and Glücksburg monarchs of Denmark and Norway descended.

The dynasty also became ancestral to later Swedish monarchs through several lines. Gustav Vasa was descended from the illegitimate branch of the House of Bjälbo through Gregers Birgersson, while Victoria of Baden, the wife of Gustaf V, descended from Euphemia through the Danish royal line.

== See also ==
- List of Swedish monarchs
- List of Norwegian monarchs
- List of Danish monarchs
- Jarl in Sweden
- Bishop of Linköping

== Sources ==
This article is fully or partially based on material from Nordisk familjebok (1908).

=== Other sources ===
- Lindkvist, Thomas with Maria Sjöberg (2006) Det svenska samhället 800-1720. Klerkernas och adelns tid, Andra upplagan (Lund: Studentlitteratur) ISBN 91-44-01181-4
- Starbäck, Georg; P.O. Bäckström (1885–1886) Berättelser ur svenska historien (Stockholm: F. & G. Beijers Förlag)

== Notes ==
*Royal House* House of Bjälbo
Preceded by House of Eric	Ruling House of the Kingdom of Sweden; 1250–1364	Succeeded by House of Mecklenburg
Preceded by Sverre dynasty	Ruling House of the Kingdom of Norway; 1319–1387	Succeeded by House of Estridsen
Preceded by House of Estridsen	Ruling House of the Kingdom of Denmark; 1376–1387	Succeeded by House of Estridsen
