= List of nobles and magnates within Scandinavia in the 13th century =

The general trend of Scandinavian nobility seems to be that there were comparatively few large magnates and that most had connections to the royalty. The sources on the nobility of 13th-century Scandinavia are, at least in the English language, few and far between compared to other regions, but there is still enough to get a good idea of the general composition. It also appears that lords had less control over the peasantry in many cases. This is probably partially due to the large nature of the countries which gave ample land for semi-independent farmers.

== Kings ==
=== Kings of Denmark ===
Name	Portrait	Birth	Marriages	Death
Canute VI (Knud 6.); 1182–1202		c. 1163 eldest son of Valdemar I and Sophia of Minsk	Gertrude of Bavaria; February 1177; Lund Cathedral no issue	12 November 1202 aged 38–39
Valdemar II the Victorious (Valdemar Sejr); 1202–1241	Non-contemporary	9 May/28 June 1170 second son of Valdemar I and Sophia of Minsk	(1) Dagmar of Bohemia c. 1205; Lübeck one son (2) Berengaria of Portugal; 18/24 May 1214 four children	28 March 1241; Vordingborg Castle aged 70
Valdemar the Young (Valdemar den Unge); 1215–1231	Non-contemporary	c. 1209 only son of Valdemar II and Dagmar of Bohemia	Eleanor of Portugal; 24 June 1229; Ribe Cathedral one child	28 November 1231; Refsnæs aged 21–22
Eric IV Ploughpenny (Erik Plovpenning); 1232–1250		c. 1216 eldest son of Valdemar II and Berengaria of Portugal	Jutta of Saxony; 17 November 1239 six children	9 August 1250 on the Schlei aged 33–34
Abel; 1 November 1250 – 1252	Non-contemporary	c. 1218 second son of Valdemar II and Berengaria of Portugal	Matilda of Holstein; 25 April 1237; Schleswig Cathedral four children	29 June 1252; Eiderstedt aged 33–34
Christopher I (Christoffer 1.); 25 December 1252 – 1259	Non-contemporary	c. 1219 third son of Valdemar II and Berengaria of Portugal	Margaret Sambiria c. 1248 five children	29 May 1259; Ribe aged 39–40
Eric V Klipping (Erik Klipping); 1259–1286		c. 1249 eldest son of Christopher I and Margaret Sambiria	Agnes of Brandenburg; 11 November 1273; Schleswig Cathedral seven children	22 November 1286; Finderup aged 36–37
Eric VI Menved (Erik Menved); 1286–1319		c. 1274 eldest son of Eric V and Agnes of Brandenburg	Ingeborg of Sweden; June 1296; Kärnan Castle fourteen children	13 November 1319; Roskilde aged 44–45

=== Kings of Norway ===
Name	Portrait	Birth	Marriage	Death
Sverre Sigurdsson; 1184–1202		c. 1151; Bergen; Alleged illegitimate son of Sigurd II and Gunnhild	Margaret of Sweden; 1185	9 March 1202; Bergen aged 50–51
Inge II Bårdsson; 1204–1217	–	c. 1185; Rissa son of Bård Guttormsson and Cecilia Sigurdsdatter	never married	23 April 1217; Nidaros aged 31–32
Haakon IV Haakonsson; Haakon the Old; 1217–1263		c. 1204; Folkenborg illegitimate son of Haakon III and Inga of Varteig	Margaret Skulesdatter; 25 May 1225; Bergen four children	16 December 1263; Kirkwall aged 58–59
Haakon Haakonsson; Haakon the Young; 1240–1257		10 November 1232; Bergen second son of Haakon IV and Margaret Skulesdatter	Rikissa Birgersdotter c. 1251; Oslo one son	5 May 1257; Tønsberg aged 24
Magnus VI Haakonsson; Magnus the Law-mender; 1257–1280		1 May 1238; Tønsberg third son of Haakon IV and Margaret Skulesdatter	Ingeborg of Denmark; 11 September 1261; Bergen four sons	9 May 1280; Bergen aged 42
Eric II Magnusson; 1273–1299		c. 1268; Bergen third son of Magnus VI and Ingeborg of Denmark	(1) Margaret of Scotland; September 1281; Bergen one daughter (2) Isabel Bruce bef. 25 September 1293; Bergen one daughter	15 July 1299; Bergen aged 30–31

=== Kings of Sweden ===
Name	Portrait	Birth	Marriage(s)	Death
Sverker II the Younger (Sverker den yngre), 1196 – 31 January 1208		born before 1167, probably already c. 1164 son of king Charles VII and queen Christine Stigsdatter of Hvide	(1) Benedicta; House of Hvide	Died in the Battle of Gestilren, 17 July 1210, aged about 45, buried at Alvastra Abbey
Sverker II the Younger (Sverker den yngre), 1196 – 31 January 1208		born before 1167, probably already c. 1164 son of king Charles VII and queen Christine Stigsdatter of Hvide	(2) Ingegerd; House of Bjälbo	Died in the Battle of Gestilren, 17 July 1210, aged about 45, buried at Alvastra Abbey
Eric (X) (Erik Knutsson), 31 January 1208 – 10 April 1216		1180 son of Canute I Ericson	Rikissa of Denmark (the daughter of Valdemar I of Denmark)	Died suddenly in fever on Näs Castle, Visingsö, 10 April 1216, aged about 36, buried at Varnhem Abbey
John I the Child (Johan Sverkersson unge), Spring 1216 – 10 March 1222		1201 son of Sverker II	None	Died on Visingsö, 10 March 1222, aged about 21, buried at Alvastra Abbey
Eric (XI) the Lisp and Lame (Erik läspe och halte), Summer 1222–28 or 29 November 1229		1216 son of king Erik X of Sweden and Rikissa of Denmark	Catherine of Ymseborg	2 February 1250, aged about 34, buried at Varnhem Abbey
Canute II the Tall (Knut Långe); 28 or 29 November 1229 – 1234	King Canute II's coin	son of Holmger who was "nepos" (nephew?) of Canute I Ericson	Helen; House of Strange	1234, buried at Sko kloster
Eric (XI) the Lisp and Lame (Erik läspe och halte), 1234 – 2 February 1250		1216 son of king Erik X of Sweden and Rikissa of Denmark	Catherine of Ymseborg	2 February 1250, aged about 34, buried at Varnhem Abbey
Valdemar (Valdemar Birgersson); Spring 1250 – 22 July 1275		1239 son of Birger jarl and Ingeborg Eriksdotter (a daughter of Eric X)	Sophia of Denmark daughter of King Eric IV	Died while imprisoned by his brother Magnus at Nyköping Castle, 26 December 1302, aged about 63, buried at Vreta Abbey or Riddarholmen Church
Magnus III (Magnus Ladulås); 22 July 1275 – 18 December 1290		1240 son of Birger jarl and Princess Ingeborg Eriksdotter (a daughter of Eric X)	Helwig of Holstein; House of Schauenburg	Visingsö, 18 December 1290, aged about 50, buried in Riddarholmen Church
Birger (Birger Magnusson); 18 December 1290 – March/April 1318	Limestone painting of Birger Magnusson c. 1300	1280 son of Magnus III and Helwig of Holstein	1298 Martha of Denmark	31 May 1321, in exile in Denmark, after murdering his brothers at Nyköping Banquet, aged about 41, buried at Ringsted, Zealand

== Great Lords ==
For this list since there are not enough great lords to warrant an alphabetical list the lords will be listed by precedence. Many of the larger lordships were held as appanage for various royal family members or were held by bishops. For some of the bishoprics, some bishops who had terms under 4 years may not be listed to avoid clutter.

=== Under the Kings of Denmark ===
#	Title	Coat of arms	1st	2nd	3rd	4th	5th	6th	7th	8th	9th	10th
1	Dukes of Schleswig		Valdemar II of Denmark (1183–1216)	Valdemar the Young (1209–1216 as junior duke)	Eric IV of Denmark (1216–1232)	Abel, King of Denmark (1232–1252)	Christopher I of Denmark (1252–1254)	Valdemar III of Denmark (1254–1257)	Eric I of Denmark (1257–1272)	Margaret Sambiria (1272–1282)	Eric V of Denmark (1282–1283)	Valdemar IV, Duke of Schleswig (1283–1312)
2	Dukes of Estonia		Canute, Duke of Estonia (1220–1227, 1238–1240)	Valdemar II of Denmark (1240–1241)	Eric IV of Denmark (1241–1250)	Abel, King of Denmark (1250–1252)	Christopher I of Denmark (1252–1259)	Eric V of Denmark (1259–1266)	Margaret Sambiria (1266–1282)	Eric V of Denmark (1282–1286)	Eric VI of Denmark (1286–1319)	
3	Princes of Rugen		Jaromar I (1170–1218)	Barnuta (1218–1221)	Vitslav I (1221–1249)	Jaromar II (1249–1260)	Jaromar III (1260–1282)	Vitslav II (1260–1302)				
4	Archbishops of Lund		Andreas Sunesen (1202–1223)	Peder Saxesen (1224–1228)	Uffe Thrugotsen (1228–1252)	Jakob Erlandsen (1253–1274)	Trugot Torstensen (1276–1280)	Jens Dros (1280–1288)	Jens Grand (1289–1302)			
5	Dukes of Southern-Halland and Skarsholm		Erik Knudsen Skarsholm (1284–1304)									
6	Counts of Halland (and Northern Halland)		Niels, Count of Halland (1216–1218)	Duke Skule Bårdsson (1228–1240)	Niels II, Count of Northern Halland (1241–1251)	Jacob Nielsen, Count of Halland (1283–1305)						
7	Counts of Danish-Holstein		Albert of Orlamunde (1204–1245)									
	Gælker of Estonia/Praefectus Estoniae		Saxe Aagesen Stenbrikke	Aage Saxesen Stenbrikke								
	Gælker of Skane/Praefectus Scaniae		Saxo Aagesen Hvide	Jon Jonsen Litle								
	Marshal of the Realm		Johannes Sunesen until 1202	Johannes Esbernsen 1202–1213	Harald Reinmodsen ~1213–1221	Johannes Ebesen (1221–1250)	Iver Tagesen (1250–1252)	Laurids Abildgaard	Ivar Tokesen Tystofte (March 1252 – 1255)	Jens Kalf (1255–1267)	Anders Pedersen (1267–1275)	Stig Andersen Hvide (March 1276 – 1282, 1284–1286)
	Seneschal of the Realm		Astrad Frakke (~1230-1252)	Peder Finsen (1252–1259)	Uffe Nielsen (1268–1276)	Peder Nielsen Skovgaard (1279–1283, 1286–1289)	Tyge Abildgaard (1284)	David Thorstensen Hak (1289)	Aage Jonsen (drost) (1293–1295)	Niels Olufsen Bild(1297–1300)	Jon Jonsen Litle (1299–)	
8	Bishops of Ribe											
9	Bishops of Aarhus		Peder Vognsen (1191–1204)	Skjalm Vognsen (1205–1215)	Ebbe Vognsen (1215–1224)	Peder Elevsøn (1224–1246)	Peder Ugotsøn (1249–1260)	Tyge (bishop) (1261–1272)	Peder IV (1272–1276)	Tyge II (1276–1288)	Jens Assersøn (1288–1306)	
10	Bishops of Viborg		Gunner (Bishop of Viborg) (1222–1251)									
11	Bishops of Roskilde											
12	Bishops of Slesvig		Valdemar of Denmark (bishop) (1157–1208)	Nicholas I (bishop of Schleswig) (1209–1233)	Tuco (1234–1238)	John (1240–1244)	Eskil (1244–1255)	Nicholas II (1255–1265)	Bonde (1265–1282)	James (1282–1287)	Berthold (1287–1307)	
13	Bishops of Børglum		Rudolf (12??-1252)	Oluf Glob (1252–1260)	Johannes de Hethe (12??-1280)							
	Lord of Falsterbo and Borup		Alexander Pedersen Glob (d. after 1221)	Niels Alexandersen Due (~1210–1268)								
	Lord of Stege and Møn		Jacob Sunesson Hvide (b. 1158 d. 1246)									
	Lord of Kalundborg & Saebygard		Esbern Snare (before 1200–1204)	Peder Strangesen (1204–1241)	Anders Pedersen Ulfeldt							
	Lord of Tommerup, Knardrup, Romp, and Horningholm		Jon Reinmodsen Hvide (1190–1248)	Jon Jonsen Litle (1230–1307)								
	Lord of Kolding and Agtrupgård		Jens Kalf									
	Lord of Tranekær Castle and Ågård (Hanherred)		Erik Langeben (~1200)	Erik Eriksen Gyldenstierne (~1230)	Knud Eriksen Gyldenstierne (~1260)	Erik Knudsen Gyldenstierne Lord of Ågård (~1280)	Niels Eriksen Gyldenstierne Lord of Ågård (b. 1280)					
	Lord of Rantzau		Schacko I von Rantzau									
	Lord of Gydemath and Windethorp		Rane Esbernsen	Jon Ranesen								
	Lord of Vallø Castle		Eskild Krage									
	Lord of Tirsbæk castle		Offe Dyre (d. after 1208)	unnamed son	Offe Dyre II (d. after 1286) kings chamberlain and involved in the murder of Eric V of Denmark							
	Lord of Tosterup (Skane)		Thorkild Grim	Jep Thorkildsen Grim (b. 1265)	Jacob Jepsen Grim (b. ~1295)							
	Lord of Stenmangle		Johannes Esbernsen (d. 1213)	Jakob Hafre	Jakob Hafre II (d. after 1326)							
	Lord of Bjolderup		Ketil Urne (lived around 1200)									
	Lord of Tystofte		Niels Saltensee									
	Lord of Vestervig Vind, Buderupholm		Ago Vind									
	Lord of Andrup		Helf of Horsen	Asser Helfsson								
	Lord of Eskjær Hovedgaard		Stig Tokeson Galen									
	Lord of Holbæk and Visborg		Jon Munk	Palne Munk	Rane Jonsen (~1250-1294)							
	Lord of Gjorslev		Rane Esbernsen (~1220)	Jon Ranesen (d.1267)	Rane Jonsen (~1250-1294)							
	Lord of Asdal Hovedgård		Åge Panter									
	Lord of Vidtskøvle/Eges		Harald Egeside	Peder Haraldsson								
	Lord of Togæthorp (Lund)		Holger Krognos (b. ~1210)	Niels Holgersen (b. ~1255 - d. after 1320)								
	Lord of Flarup		Matheus de Floratorp (d. 1268)	Peder Gøye	Staverskov Gøye (d. 1314)							
	Lord of ToksværdBishopsman of Bjernede and Fodby		Iver Lunge (b. ~1240)	Oluf Lunge (d. 1302) brother in law of King Christopher II of Denmark								
	Lord of Terslose, Broholm, and Hong		Anders Knudsen Grosen	Johannes Andersen Ulfeldt (d. after 1259)	Abasalon Jonsen (~1326)							
	Lord of Tysofte		Toki Saltensee (1190–1252)	Oluf Tokesen (1250–1310)								
	Lord of Tubetorp		Anders Nielsen Due (b. ~1222, d. after 1285)	Niels Andersen Due (b. 1262 d. 1332)								
	Lords of Margård		Tyge Abildgaard (knight 1230–1260)	Laurids Abildgaard	Timme Lauridsen Abildgaard							
	Lords of Elkær Vendsyssel		Niels Olufsen Bild (living ~1300)									
	Lords of Hvedholm Castle		Jakob Bille (mentioned 1246)									
	Lords of Højbygård		Thorsten Hak (Mentioned 1241)	David Thorstensen Hak (d. 1302)								
	Lord of Hegnet and Hald		Jacob Bugge	Niels Jacobsen Bugge (b. ~1235, d. after 1302)	Bugge Nielsen (b. after 1265, d. after 1332)							
	Lord of Støvringgård		Niels Juul (Støvringgård) (d. after 1299)	Jon Juul (b. ~1265, d. 1316)								
	Lord of Kås		Niels Lændi	Niels Lændi (1260–1314)								
	Lord of Hikkebjerg		Esge Brock (living around 1300)									
	Lord of Redebas (Mecklenburg)		Matthæus Molteke (~1220)	Frederik Moltke til Stredfeld (d. After 1265)	Johann von Moltke (d. ~1309)	Eberhard Moltke (d. 1310)						
	Lords of Rundtoft in Anglia (peninsula)		Peder Skram (mentioned 1315)									

=== Under the Kings of Norway ===
#	Title	Coat of arms	1st	2nd	3rd	4th	5th	6th	7th	8th
1	Jarls of Norway		Haakon the Crazy (1203–1214)	Skule Bardsson (~1215–1240, centered in Trondheim)	Knut Haakonsson (1239–1262)					
	Kings of the Isles		Rǫgnvaldr Guðrøðarson (1188–1226)	Óláfr Guðrøðarson (died 1237) (1226–1237)	Haraldr Óláfsson (1237–1248)	Rǫgnvaldr Óláfsson (died 1249) (1249)	Haraldr Guðrøðarson (1249–1250)	Magnús Óláfsson (1252–1265)		
	Archbishops of Nidaros		Eirik Ivarsson (1189–1205)	Tore (Thorer) Gudmundsson (1206–1214)	Guttorm (bishop) (1215–1224)	Sigurd Eindridesson Tafse (1231–1252)	Einar Smjørbak Gunnarsson (1255–1263)	Haakon Toresson (1265–1267)	Jon Raude (1268–1282)	Jørund (bishop) (1288–1309)
	Jarl of Orkney		David Haraldsson (1206)	Jon Haraldsson (1206–1231)	Magnus II, Earl of Orkney (1236–1239)	Gilbert Earl of Orkney (~1239–1256)	Magnus III of Orkney (1256–1273)	Magnus Magnusson, Earl of Orkney (1273–1284)	Jón Magnússon, Earl of Orkney (1284–1312)	
	Jarl of Iceland		Snorri Sturluson (1197–1241 de facto)	Gissur Þorvaldsson (1258–1268)						
	Counts of Northern-Halland		Skule Bårdsson (1228–1240)	Niels II, Count of Northern Halland (1241–1251)	Jacob Nielsen, Count of Halland (1283–1305)					
	Earls of Sarpsborg		Erling Alfsson av Tanberg (~1180–1220)	Alv Erlingsson Tanberg (1220–1240)	Erling Alvsson Tornberg (1260–1283)	Alv Elingsson (1283–1290)				
	Jarl Simonsson		Philip Simonsson (~1200–1217)							
	Jarl Ribbung		Sigurd Ribbung (c. 1217–1226)							
	Lawspeaker of Gulating		Dagfinn the Yeoman (c. 1220–1233)							
	Lawspeaker of Ryfylke		Amundi Cockscomb (c. 1210–1230)							
	Lawspeaker of the Althing			Snorri Sturluson (1215–1218)						
	Barons/Lendmann of Mel and Ænes		Gaut of Mel (~1210–1270)	Finn Gautsson (1270–1288)						
	Barons/Lendmann of Giskegodset		Bjarne Mårdsson (~1200–1223)	Ivar Bjarneson (1223~1240)	Erling (Ivarsson) Bjarkøy (1240–1263)	Bjarne Erlingsson (1263–1313)				
	Baron/Lendmann of Hegranes/Ålhus Jølster		Hugliek Johnsson	Audun Hugleiksson (1263–1302)						
	Barons/Lendmann of Sorum		Olav Ivarsson Mok (~1200–1224, King's Haakon IV of Norway's uncle)	Ivar Olavsson av Skedjuhof (1224–1247)	Jon Raud Ivarsson till Sudrheim (1248–1312)					
	Barons/Lendmann of Lekum		Tore Olavsson Tinghatt på Stordal (~1200–1265)	Tore Byskopson (1265–1317)						
	Barons/Lendmann of Stårheim		Andrew Simonsson (1200?-1218)	Gregorius Andersson (1218–1246)	Andrew Gregoriousson(1246–1302)					
	Barons/Lendmann of Hesby Church		Sigurd Ivarsson Rova (~1250-1280?)	Ogmund Sigurdsson Rova (?1280-1311)						
	Barons/Lendmann Helgesson		Helge	Sæbjørn Helgesson (?1290-1324)						
	Barons/Lendmann Verdalen		Vigleik Audunsson Verdalen (~1273-1295)							
	Barons/Lendmann of Talgje		Gaute Erlingsson (~1260-1288)							
	Baron/Lendmann of Naustdal		Eiliv of Naustdal (~1260-1277)							
	Baron/Lendmann of Kvåle		Jon Kvåle (?1200-1260)	Brynjulf Jonsson Kvåle(?1260-1273)						
	Baron/Lendmann of Edøy		Pål Plytt (?1200-1240)	Andres Pålson Plytt (~1240-1280						
	Lord/Lendmann of Stange, Tomb in Råde, and of Ullensaker		Harald Agmundsson Bolt (~1200–1227)	Halldor Haraldson Kusse (1227–1259)	Halvard Haraldsen Bratt (Lord of Tomb 1259–1317)					
	Lord/Lendmann of Blakstad, Akershus		Gudolf of Blakkasteads							
	Lord/Lendmann of Samsal in Ringsaker		Harald Agmundsson Bolt (~1200–1227)	Halldor Haraldson Kusse (1227–1259)	Jon Tore Haldorsson Kusse (1259–1320)					
	Lord/Lendmann of Kinsarvik		Martin Konungsfrænd (~1200 – after 1223)							
	Lord/Lendmann of Austrått/Eastairt		John of Eastairt	Åsulv Eiriksson(~1210-1238)	Sigrid Abbess of Rein (~1238-1240)					
	Lord/Lendmann of Blindheim		Ragnvald Urka (????-1263)	Jon Smør (~1260-1328)						
	Sysselman/Steward of Orkdal		Lendirman Ogmund Crouchdance (~1200 – after 1263)							
	Sysselman/Steward of Hedmark		Frederick the Slobberer	Harold Agmundsson Bolt (1227)	Munan Byskopson (~1240–1250?)					
	Sysselman/Steward of Hadeland		Gunnbjorn Johnsbrodir							
	Sysselman/Steward of Viken		Sigurd Kingskin (1217–)							
	Sysselman/Steward of Hedmark		Olav Ivarsson Mok							
	Sysselman/Steward of Gudbrandsdalen		Endrid Bookling (1218–)							
	Sysselman/Stewards of Skaun		Arnbjorn Johnson (~1217–1240)							
	Bishops of Oslo		Nikolas Arnesson (Bishop) (1190–1225)	Orm of Oslo (1226–1244)	Haakon Toresson (1244–1265)	Andre (Bishop) (1267–1287)	Eyvind (Bishop) (1288–1303)			
	Bishops of Bergen		Martin of Bergen (1194–1216)	Håvard (Bishop) (1217–1224)	Arne of Bergen (1226–1256)	Peter of Bergen (1257–1270)	Askatin (Bishop) (1271–1277)	Narve (Bishop) (1278–1304)		
	Bishops of Stavanger		Njål of Stavanger (1189–1207)	Henrik of Stavanger (1207–1224)	Askell Johnsson (1226–1254)	Torgils of Stavanger (1255–1276)	Arne of Stavanger (1277–1303)			
	Bishops of Hamar		Ivar Skjalg (1194–1221)	Halvard of Hamar (1221–1231)	Pål (Bishop) (1232–1251)	Peter of Hamar (1253)	Gislebert de Norwich (1263–1275, resigned)	Thorfinn of Hamar (1278–1285)	Jørund (Bishop) (1286–1287)	Torstein of Hamar (1288–1304)
	Bishops of the Isles		Michael (1194–1203)	Nicholas (1210–1217)	Reginald (1217–1226)	John (II), son of Hefar (until 1230)	Simon (1230–1248)	Richard (1253–1274)	Mark (1276–1303)	
	Bishops of Kirkjubøur									
	Bishops of Garðar									
	Bishops of Hólar									
	Bishops of Skálholt		Páll Jónsson of Skalholt (1194–1211)							
	Gothi of Oddi		Ormur Breiðbælingur Jónsson (1197–1218)							
	Gothi of Hvammur í Dölum		Sighvatr Sturluson (~1180–1238)	Þórður kakali Sighvatsson (1238–1256)						
	Gothi of Reynistað in Skagafjörður		Kolbein Arnórsson Kaldaljós (~1180–1246)							
	Gothi of Víðimýri		Arnór Tumason (1184–1221)	Kolbeinn ungi Arnórsson (1221–1245)						
	Gothi of Hruni in Hrunamannahreppur, Árn		Gissur Hallsson, of Haukdæla (1150–1206)	Þorvaldur Gissurarson (1206–1235)	Gissur Þorvaldsson (1235–1268)					
	Priors of Nidarholm Abbey									
	Asbirngar Clan of Skafafjordur									

=== Under the Kings of Sweden ===
#	Title	Coats of arms	1st	2nd	3rd	4th	5th	6th	7th	8th	9th	10th
1	Jarls of Sweden		Jon Jarl (~1190–1206)	Knut Birgersson, Riksjarl of Sweden (120?–1208)	Folke Birgersson (1208–1210)	Karl the Deaf (1210–1220)	Ulf Fase (1220?–? and 1231–1248)	Birger Jarl (1248–1266)				
2	Archbishops of Uppsala		Olof Lambatunga (1198–1206)	Valerius (1207–1219)	Olof Basatömer (1224–1234)	Jarler (1236–1255)	Laurentius (1255–1267)	Folke Johansson Ängel (1267–1274)	Jakob Israelsson (1278–1281)	Jakob Israelsson (1285–1289)	Johannes (1289–1291)	Nils Allesson (1292–1305)
3	Dukes of Sweden		Magnus, Duke of Sweden (1266–1275)	Erik Birgersson (1275)	Erik Magnusson (1284–1318)							
4	Dukes of Finland		Benedict, Duke of Finland (1284–1291)	Valdemar, Duke of Finland (1291–1318)								
	Lawspeaker of Vastergotland		Sigtrygg Algotsson	Algot Sigtryggsson	Eskil Magnusson (~1205–1227)	Gustaf (1230)	Folke (1240)	Peter Näf (1251–1253)	Gustaf Petersson (lejon) (1260–1270)	Algot Brynolfsson (1270–1288)	Bengt Hafridsson (1294–1305)	
	Lawspeaker of Östergötland		Magnus Minniskiöld (~1200)	Lars Petersson (lawman) (144–1247)	Magnus Bengtsson (Bjälboätten) (1247–1263)	Bengt Magnusson (Bjälboätten's lawman branch) (1269–1294)	Magnus Bengtsson (1289–1291)	Svantepolk of Viby (1294–1310)				
	Lawspeaker of Tiohärad		Folke in Värend	Karl Ingeborgasson (Lejonbalk) (1266–1268)	Folke Karlsson (Lejonbalk) (1273–1283)	Nils Sigridsson (Natt och Dag) (1286–1299)						
	Lawspeaker of Värmland		Höldo (stråle) (1268)	Karl Haraldsson (1285)	Tyrner Jonsson (tuppfot) (1291–1295)							
	Lawspeaker of Närke		Filip Törnesson (Hjorthorn) (1272–1279)	Knut Matsson (Lejonbjälke) (1282–1288)	Sune lagman (fisk) (1300)							
	Lawspeaker of Södermanland		Björn Näf (1285–1286)	Anund Haraldsson (vingad lilja)	Johan Ingevaldsson (Ornsparre) (1295–1304)							
	Lawspeaker of Uppland		Birger Persson (Finstaätten) (1296–1316)									
5	Bishops of Turku		Thomas (1230–1245)	Bero (1248–1258)	Ragvald (1258–1266)	Catillus (1266–1286)	Johannes (1286–1290)	Magnus (1291–1308)				
6	Bishops of Strangnas											
7	Bishops of Vasteras											
8	Bishops of Linkoping											
9	Bishops of Vaxjo											
10	Bishops of Skara											
	Lord of Bjälbo		Magnus Minniskiöld (d. 1210)									
11	Lords of Viby		Svantepolk of Viby (~1235–1310)									
	Lords/Princes of Fiholm Castle		Erik Valdemarsson the Elder (1271–1330)	Valdemar Eriksson (b. before 1330, d. before 1379)	Erik Valdemarsson the younger (b. before 1379 d. before 1396)							
	Lords of Skokloster		Canute II of Sweden (d. 1234)	Holmger Knutsson (b. 1210 d. 1248)								
	Lords of Salneck		Karl Ingeborgasson (Lejonbalk) (1263–1273)	Folke Karlsson (Lejonbalk) (1273–1286)	Magnus Karlsson (Lejonbalk) (1286–1316)							
	Lord of Aranäs Castle		Torkel Knutsson (1289–1306)									
	Lord of Salsta Castle, Ängsö Castle, and Arnö		Magnus Minniskiöld (d. 1210)	Birger Jarl (d. 1266)	Karl Gregersson (Bjälboättens oäkta gren) (d. 1276)	Karl Gregersson (Bjälboättens oäkta gren) (d. 1301)						
	Lords of Vik Castle		Anders	Israel Andersson And (d. 1289)	Karl Gregersson (Bjälboättens oäkta gren) (d. 1301)							
	Lords of Fånö (Uppland)		Karl Tjälfvesson (Fånöätten) (living 1274)	Johan Karlsson (Fånöätten) (d. 1280)	Folke Jonsson (Fånöätten) (d. 1313)							
	Lords of Långnäs, Kättilstad		Karl the Deaf (d. 1220)	Karl Karlsson (Ulv) (b. 1220 d. after 1253)	Ulf Karlsson (Ulv) (1247–1281)	Filip Ulfsson (Ulv) (d. ~1333)						
	Lords of Finsta gård		Israel Finstaätten (d. before 1269)	Peter Israelsson (d. 1280)	Birger Persson (d. 1327)							
	Lords of Aspenäs Östergötland		Filip (Aspenäsätten) (d. before 1279)	Birger Filipsson (Aspenäsätten) (d. 1280)	Knut Jonsson (Aspenäsätten) (b. before 1280, d. 1347)							
	Lords of Balingsta		Johan Ängel (living before 1250)	Karl Johansson Angel (alive 1253)	Magnus Johansson Angel (d. 1294)							
	Lords of Fröshammar Södermanland		Anund Björnsson Vingad lilja (living 1250)	Harald Gudmundsson (living 1270)	Anund Haraldsson (vingad lilja) (b. 1230, d 1291)	Rörik Birgersson den yngre (1291–1322)						
	Lords of Säckestad		Knut Matsson (Lejonbjälke) (d. 1289)									
	Lord of Bromsten		Ingevald Torstensson (Örnsparre)	Johan Ingevaldsson (Ornsparre) (d. 1309)								
	Lords of Liljeholmen, Boxholm		Erengisle Näskonungsson (d. 1328)									
	Lords of Boberga Dingtuna		Mat Boberga (d. before 1219)	Bengt Matsson (Knighted 1219)	Lars Bengtsson Boberga	Erik Larsson Boberga						
	Lords of Runby Vallentuna Municipality and Stormman of Uppland		Peter Larsson	Filip Petersson (Prince, d. 1251)	Filip Finvidsson (b. 1240s, d. after 1307)							
	Lords of Landsjö		Holmger Folkesson (d. after 1254)	Ulf Holmgersson (Ama) (d. after 1290)	Lars Ulfsson (Ama) (d. after 1350)							
	Lords of Strand in Jäder		Rörik Birgersson the elder (mentioned 1250)	Birger Röriksson	Rörik Birgersson the younger (alive 1322)							
	Lords of Fagranäs		Anund Tunasson (d. before 1293)									
	"Counts"/Lords of Ulvåsa castle, Kägleholm Närke and Loholm		Gudmar Magnusson (Ulvåsaätten) (d. after 1313)									
	Lords of Aspnäs Uppsala		Mats Kettilmundsson (d. 1326)									
	Lords of Flishult (Vetlanda)		Tuke Jonsson (Läma) (d. 1321)	Sune Jonsson (Bååt) (b. 13th c. d. 1339)								
	Lords of Alnängarna Örebro		Brynjolf	Algot Brynolfsson (b. 1228, d after 1298)	Rörik Algotsson (d. 14th c)							
	Lords of Agnetorp		Bengt Hafridsson (d. after 1296)	Brynolf Bengtsson (d. 1315)								
	Lord of Sättuna		Tune	Håkan Tunesson (d. after 1289)								
	Lords of Kianäs Älmhult Municipality		Peter Bonde (late 13th c.)									
	Lords of Fullbro Sorunda		Bo	Bengt Bosson (b. before 1283, d. 1336)								
	Lords of Aska Hundred		Elof	Johan Elofsson Elofssönernas (d. after 1295)								
	Lords of Fållnäs Södertörn		Magnus Marinason (mentioned 1298–1308)									
	Lords of Malsta Norrtälje Municipality		Johan i Malsta (Mentioned 1298–1317)									
	Lords of Bergkvara, Växjö		Magnus Sibbesson (Living 1312)									
	Lords of Frösvik Östra Ryd		Finvid Nilsson (Living 1298–1327)									
	Lords of Grensholm Vånga		Knut	Harald Knutsson Gren (d. around 1330)								
	Lords of Villberga Enköping Municipality		Nils (b. 13th century)	Magnus Nilsson (Vilberga) (Mentioned 1305–1329)								
	Lords of Hammersta Nynäshamn Municipality		Estrid	Ingevald Estridsson (mentioned 1308–1322)								
	Lords of Hallatorp Västergötland		Abjorn (b. 13th c)	Knut Abjörnsson (d. before 1339)								
	Lords of Gröneborg		Joar Blå (d. late 13th c)									
13	Lords of Gastrikland											

== Noblemen, Kingsmen, Lendmen, and Knights ==
=== Under the Kings of Denmark ===
Ditlev Reventlow (~1210~1260) (Bailiff of Ditmarsken)

Johann von Haxthausen (~1245–1300) (Borgmester of Paderborn)

Stig Anderson (1230–1293)

Jens Kalf (~1230–1304)

Havtor Jonsson (~1255–1320)

Elv Erlingsson (~1240–1290)

Tyge Abildgaard (~1200–1260)

Laurid's Abildgaard (~1240–1280)

Aluericus de Bernekowe (~1190–1240)

Detlev Brockdorff (~1200–1250)

Sifridus de Bokwolde (~1200–1250)

Niels Hak (~1225~1282)

Thorsten Hak (~1220~1282)

Niels Juul (~1255–1300)

Oluf Lunge (~1245–1302)

Gerhardus de Oldenburg (~1230~1280)

Conradus de Oldenburg (~1230~1280)

Theodoricus de Quale (~1200~1250)

Johann Ranzow (~1200~1250)

Heinrich de Wedele (~1185–1240)

Hasso de Wedele (~1185–1240)

Reimbem de Wedele (~1185–1240)

Adam von Winterfeld (~1250–1300)

Heinrich von Bardenflete (~1190–1240)

Niels Brock (~1270–1330)

Rane Jonsen (1254–1294)

Borchadus Dus (~1230–1280)

Hartwicus Dus (~1230–1280)

Heinrich von Lu (~1200–1260)

Niels I Uffesen Neb (~1240–1300)

Johann Ranzow (~1200–1250)

Wernerus de Sculenburch (~1215–1265)

Ago Wind (~1170–1220)

Tue the Tall – Late 12th century (Important Knight of Bishop Absalon who fought the wends)

Esbern – Late 12th century (From Zealand, Important Knight of Bishop Absalon who fought the wends)

Then Niels – Late 12th century (Skilled knight from Zealand)

Thorbjorn – Late 12th century (A good knight mentioned in Gesta Danorum volume II)

Herbord – Late 12th century

Eskil – Late 12th century

Peder Thorsentenson – Knight, brother in law to Absalon, possibly still living at the beginning of the 13th century

Mogens Trefeld (b. ~1260) - Knight named after coat of arms

Josef Magnussen Drefeld (d. 1301) - Knight, son of Mogens Trefeld, man of Eric VI of Denmark, murdered in Lund

=== Under the Kings of Norway ===
Jon Smør (~1260–1328)

Sigurd Ribbung

Martin Konungsfrænd (c. 1180–1245) – Councillor, Liegeman, Royalty

Simon Kine (c. 1190–1245) – Liegeman

John Steel (Liegeman) (c. 1170–1230) – Liegeman

Brynjolf Steel (~1205–1270) – Liegeman, son of John Steel

Ivar Nosy (~1190–1250) – Liegeman

Andrew Shieldband – Kinsman and Special friend of King Haakon IV of Norway

Ogmund Crouchdance

Munan Byskopson (~1200–1260)

Sigurdr Byskupsson – Brother of Munan

Jakob Bille

Thorkel Bille

Elv Haraldsson Bolt

Ivar in Skedjuhov

Jon Ivarsson

Havtore Jonsson

Skules Bardssons men:

Alf of Leifa-steads (~1200–1240)

Endrid Bookling (~1180–1240)

Norwegian Rebels:

Bene Skinnkniv (~1170–1222) – Priest who claimed to be the son of Magnus V of Norway and lead a band of rebels called the Slittungene from 1217 to 1222

Gudolf of Blakkasteads – Guardian of Sigurd Ribbung during his minority and leader of the Ribalds in 1217

=== Under the Kings of Sweden ===
Håkan Jonsson Läma (~1270–1318) (Marshal of Sweden: 1310–1318)

Tyrgils Knutsson (~1260–1306), (Knight: 1289–1306) (Regent of Sweden: 1290–1298)

Knut Matsson (~1250–1289), (Steward, Councillor: 1280–1289)

Filip Törnesson (Lawman: 1272–1279)

Ulf Karlsson (1247–1276), (Councillor: 1276–1280)

Folke Karlsson (1262–1286), (Knight: 1273–1280)

Magnus Ragvaldsson (~1250–1288)

Karl Gustafsson (marsk) (d. after 1280)

Håkan Ingeborgasson (d. after 1320)

Magnus Ragvaldsson - drots 1288

Birger Filipsson (Aspenäsätten) - (d. 1280) executed for participating in the Folkunga Uprising

Johan Filipsson (Aspenäsätten) - (d. 1280) executed for participating in the Folkunga Uprising

Orestes Keldorsson (d. after 1305) - castle bailiff of Stockholm 1289

Werner Brunkow (living 1286–1290) - Mecklenburg immigrant in service of the king of Sweden

Henrik Glysing (d. after 1324) - Nobleman from Holstein in the service of the king of Sweden

Tomas Jonsson Grip (mentioned 1296–1299) - Ancestor of Bo Jonsson (Grip)

Leonard Ödesson (Örnfot) (d. after 1310)

Ragvald Puke (Mentioned 1296–1308)

Ragne Stallare (Stablemaster in 1274)

Nils Sestridasson (mentioned 1287–1301)

Hemming Ödgislason (knight in 1303)

Birger Likvidsson (bought land in 1303)

Abjörn Sixtensson (~1275–1310)

Johan Karlsson (~1250–1280)

Rorik Algotsson (~1260–1300)

Algot Brynolfsson (1228–1299)

Magnus Algotssson (~1270–1309)

Johan Krummedige

Sounds Krummedige

Iven Krummedige

Nicolaus de Ottenbüttel Krummedige

Eler de Ottenbüttel Krummedige

Volbrecht de Ottenbüttel Krummedige

Nils in Långserum

== See also ==
- List of nobles and magnates of England in the 13th century
- List of nobles and magnates within the Holy Roman Empire in the 13th century
- List of nobles and magnates of France in the 13th century
