= Gudolf of Blakkasteads =

13th century Norwegian captain and rebel leader

Gudolf of Blakkasteads (C. 1180-1226) was a Norwegian captain, steward and later rebel leader and guardian to Sigurd Ribbung. He is mentioned in 1218 as a former captain of the Bagler who transferred his allegiance to king Haakon IV of Norway (along with Arnbjorn Johnson, Simon Kine, and Endrid Bookling. During King Haakon's reassigning of Stewardships after the war Gudolf is mentioned to have previously been a Steward but was not given a new stewardship on account of having a bad reputation with the freemen of the stewardship he had formerly administered.

After receiving no honors from the king Gudolf was upset and decided to send his son Eilif Crown along with his henchmen Eric Scrap and John the Talker III to Halland to seek out Sigurd Ribbung. Sigurd was found and Gudolf seems to have taken the boy under his guardianship because he immediately became his head councilor. Following Gudolf's attachment to Sigurd several other chiefs attached themselves to Sigurd. If each chief contributed a 20 bench ship than the Ribbungs would have had at least 200 men from its inception.

Gudolf's "sworn brother" Ivar Outwick held Oslo in the name of the king and despite this sworn friendship Gudolf attacked Ivar on Hofud-Isle in 1219. Despite the sneak attack Ivar Outwick escape in boat. Crucially, Gudolf was able to capture Ivar's ship, arms, and armor which added a lot of might to the Ribbalds.

In 1221 Gudolf's men would be in Oslo during the day but would stay at neighboring farms at night. Skule Bårdsson discovered which farm Gudolf was staying at (a monks farm at Foss) and encircled it proceeding to attack it; incredibly Gudolf was able to escape the encirclement and get away. The fact he was able to escape would strongly suggest that he was on the river leading into Bogstadvannet and took a small boat out. In the winter following Earl Skule attacked the Ribbalds often. In 1222 Bishop Nicholas tried to mediate between the Ribalds and the Royal government and he got Gudolf's Concubine Asa Black to try to encourage the Ribbalds to come to terms with the royal government.

Following the surrender of the Ribbalds by Sigurd Ribbung to Skule Bårdsson Gudolf retired to his stronghold and farm in 1226. While Gudolf had been part of the Ribbalds he had caused a lot of mischief in the area in which he lived and he had beaten and stolen from a farmer called Otryg. In 1226 the farmers son's Asolf and Gudleif got a band of men together and scaled the church where Gudolf was living with ladders and cut down the roof jumping in and killing Gudolf. There was not a lot of grief for Gudolf after his death because of how he had behaved during his life.

Gudolf is clearly depicted as a villain; his poor treatment of freemen and farmers, his theft and violence, and his treachery. Despite the accounts being written from the perspective of the successors to Haakon IV of Norway many leaders of rebels are not depicted nearly as villainous as Gudolf. For example Skule Bardsson and Sigurd Ribbung are depicted in a far more positive light. This lends credibility to the records of his villainy. Even his name "Gudolf Blacky" implies his villainous nature.
