= Gaut of Mel =

Norwegian nobleman of the Ænes-Mel family

Gaut of Mel (a.k.a. Lendmann Gaut Johnsson) (c. 1190-1270) was a powerful Norwegian nobleman, Chief, and Liegeman who was lord of Mel and Ænes. He was the son of Jon Gautson på Ornes and the older brother of Arnbjorn Johnson and Askel Johnson Bishop of Stavanger. He was part of the larger Ænes-Mel Noble family, one of the most prestigious in Norway. He was also the father of Baron Finn Gautsson.

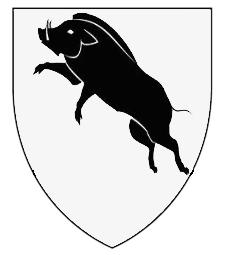
The Boar was the Ornes Family coat of arms

He was one of the six liegeman listed as in attendance of the meeting to determine king Haakon IV of Norway's legitimacy in 1223 (along with Paul flida, Peter Flida, Brynjulf Canutesson, John Steel (Liegeman), and Ivar Nosy). In the early years of Haakon IV of Norway he was one of the chief officers of the royal government.

In 1235 he is included in the list of Liegemen who were with the king during the conflict escalation with Skule Bårdsson. In 1239 he is considered by Snorri Sturluson to have purposely soured relations between the King and Duke Skule Bårdsson thus leading to the conflict escalating between the King and Duke. Skule Bardsson is famous for having made a jest that Odin who used to set kings against each other was actually known as Gaut. When Snorri agreed with Skule, the duke told him to compose a verse on the spot and Snorri said;

"The Charm Creator called to war Bing and Wartusk rival kings, Gaut stirred up that rush of strife, Odin-Gaut I meant to say"

The verse is meant to be comedic but it also shows some respect for Gaut by comparing him to the god of war. In 1240 when the Wolfskins were calling king Haakon Haakon sleepy-head Gaut was with the king along with Peter Paulsson, Asolf Earlkin, Gunnar Kingskin, and Issac of Bræ. Gaut was an important commander during the Battle of Oslo in 1240 April 21. He was the banner bearer and when he chased Olaf of Vigdeild into the Church of Saint Laurence in Oslo he asked if Olaf wanted peace; Olaf replied he did, to which Gaut said to stay in the church if he wanted peace.

After the victorious battle Gaut let Arfin Thiof be slain in 1241. Later in 1247 Gaut was listed first among the liegemen who attended Haakon IV of Norway's recoronation. During the invasion of Halland in 1253 Gaut showed up to the levy and was listed as the third most noble of the liegemen (Peter of Giske, Nicholas of Giske, Gaut, Brnyjulf Johnsson). Considering he showed up to the levy it is likely that he fought in the coming conflict. During the Shetland Campaign by Haakon IV of Norway in 1263 Gaut stayed behind in Norway to help govern the country. He died in the year 1270 AD.
