= Brynjolf Steel =

Norwegian Liegeman

Brynjolf Steel (c. 1205 – c. 1270) was the son of the Norwegian Liegeman John Steel (Liegeman). He is a good example of how even in countries without strong feudal inheritance policies vassal-ship could be passed down from father to son.

He is first mentioned in 1235 as a grown man with a large entourage by Skule Bårdsson as someone who Skule did not trust. In 1239, he was one of the Liegemen who king Haakon IV of Norway sent word to alongside the kings kinsman Gunnar, Nicholas Paulsson, and Nicholas of Bæ. Since he was one of the liegemen who was in contact with the king directly before the battle of Oslo he probably participated in the battle.

In 1247, he was one of the nine liegemen (Gaut Johnsson, Lodin Gunnisson, Gunnar Kings Kinsman, Munan Byskopson, Finn Gautsson, John Queen (Liegeman), and Sigurd Byskopson) listed at a re-coronation feast which the king held to establish his legitimacy. During the procession of the coronation Brynjolf was either one of the three liegemen bearing the large tableboard with the king's robes or one of the five liegemen with swords drawn.

In 1253, he is listed fourth (Peter of Giski, Nicholas of Giski (his son), Gaut of Mel, Brynjolf Steel, as one of the most noble liegemen in the levy which was to try to conquer Halland from Denmark.

Later, he also participated in the 1263 attack on Scotland and is listed as one of the important men in King Haakons specially picked crew. He was with the king in Kirkwall when Haakon was very ill and was thus part of his household. He is listed first among the four liegemen who were at King Haakon's side at his deathbed (Brynjolf, Erling Alfson, John Queen (Liegeman), Rognvald Ork). Directly after his death he and Bishop Thorgils along with two other men were the only ones who were not duty-bound to leave the room. Instead he was responsible for washing and shaving the kings dead body. Because he was so close to the king at his death that he washed the body it is almost certain he attended the funeral in the following days. This appears to be the last mention of Brynjolf and it is likely he retired from public life and died a few years later.
