= Alf of Leifa-steads =

Alf of Leifa-steads (~1200–1240) was a Housecarl, commander of the vårbelger (Norwegian Civil War), and liegeman of Duke Skule Bårdsson. He enters history as a Housecarl of Arnbjorn Johnson who was a kingsman. In 1235 he did fealty to Skule becoming his liegeman. In 1239 he was sent into the Uplands as the leader of an army of 500 men to harass the kings men who were hiding in churches or woods. In the spring of 1240 AD. he was sent ahead of Skule's army to scout with a few men- however he ran into enemies led by Earl Knut Haakonsson. One of his men was beheaded by one of Knut's men because the two had a personal quarrel. The result of this exchange is that Knut challenged Skule to a battle at Lierfields. He led the defense at the Battle of Goat-Bridge in 1240 for Skule against King Haakon IV of Norway where he is said to have fought very bravely. This conflict was part of a larger series of conflict known as the Civil war era in Norway. He was one of the leaders of a group known as the vårbelger. During the battle the supporters of Skule set up on a hill near a church where they had a defensive position. During the attack the vårbelger and supporters of Skule used this defensive position to throw rocks at the enemy, a somewhat unusual strategy given the improvised nature of the fortifications. The fighting of the battle is said to have been very fierce on both sides to the extent that the kings Hauberk was destroyed. However the king and his men were able to advance and force many of the vårbelger into the church where they were able to defend it with rocks. Alf saw that they would be trapped inside the church soon so he fought his way out and was chased to the river where he was killed after fighting to his last breathe.
