= Martin Konungsfrænd =

Norwegian kinsman

Martin Konungsfrænd, also known as Martin of Kinsarvik), was a liegeman, councilor, and kinsman of king Haakon IV of Norway. He held Kinsarvik as a fief from the king. In 1219, he was one of the king's councilors who was uneasy about Earl Skule Bårdsson. Along with the other councillors, he sent word to Arnbjorn Jonson and several others expressing their concerns about Skule. In 1223, he is listed first among the king's councillors in Bergen.
