= Andrew Shieldband =

Subject, kinsman, and friend of King Haakon IV of Norway

Andrew Shieldband (~before 1190 – after 1229) was a liegeman, kinsman, raider, and special friend of King Haakon IV of Norway. In 1214 in response to king Inge II of Norway's refusal to grant him the fief of Jämtland or any other fief, Shieldband was one of the king's kinsmen who advised Haakon to flee Inge's court and raise an army. In 1218, he fasted with the king's mother Inga of Varteig along with Dagfinn the Yeoman, Sigurd Kingskin and several clerks in preparation for the ordeal by hot iron which she would suffer in order to prove her son was the rightful heir to the throne.

In 1218, he and Vegard of Veradale were responsible for a body guard of 12 men who followed the king at all times. Later in the same year after attacking and chasing off the Slittungene (a rival army supporting a different candidate to the throne) in naval warfare, he was one of the kingsmen (along with Dagfinn the Yeoman, Vegard of Veradale, Guttorm Gunnison) who protected the king from Earl Skule Bårdsson when he attacked to avenge the loss of a limb of one of his relatives. In 1219, he and Vegard of Veradale were given the stewardship "in the northernmost thing district" because they were "the most special friends of the king".

== Murder of Vegard ==
In 1221 friends of Vegard of Veradale came to the king alleging that Andrew had allowed two of his men (Botolf Limb and Ozur Nit) to kill him while Vegard was staying with Andrew. The incident happened near Andrews house at Hinn. Skule Bardsson advised revenge on Andrew but the king's council advised the king not to kill Andrew but only to take away his honors (stewardship). The reason behind the advice for mercy was because the council believed that Andrew had been pressured to do the deed by those who hated Vegard and Andrew. Andrew arrived in Bergen in a 20 bench ship and repented. Andrew had his stewardship taken but strangely he was given one by Earl Skule who was probably trying to bring him into his folde.

== Later voyages ==
In 1222, Shieldband set out on a warfare voyage to Bjarmaland with Ivar Outwick and four ships. The cause for the mission was apparently to take revenge on the king of Bjarmaland for killing Norwegian traders. Andrew and Ivar gained furs and silver from their raid. Ivar's ship capsized and he and one other were the only ones on their ship who survived but Shieldband made it out to Helgeland with a great amount of plunder.

In 1229, Shieldband made ready to go on crusade to Jerusalem through Oslo. He reached Zealand and went on to Whitsand and was never heard from again. Haakon IV even wrote to Frederick II asking him to enquire as to Andrew's whereabouts but nevertheless he was never found.

== Family ==
Shieldband had a wife Ingibjorg and apparently a son named Peter but Ingibjorg revealed after Andrew's disappearance that Skule was Peter's father. Skule acknowledged Peter as his son and even took him into his household.
