= Jens Juel (painter) =

Danish painter (1745–1802)

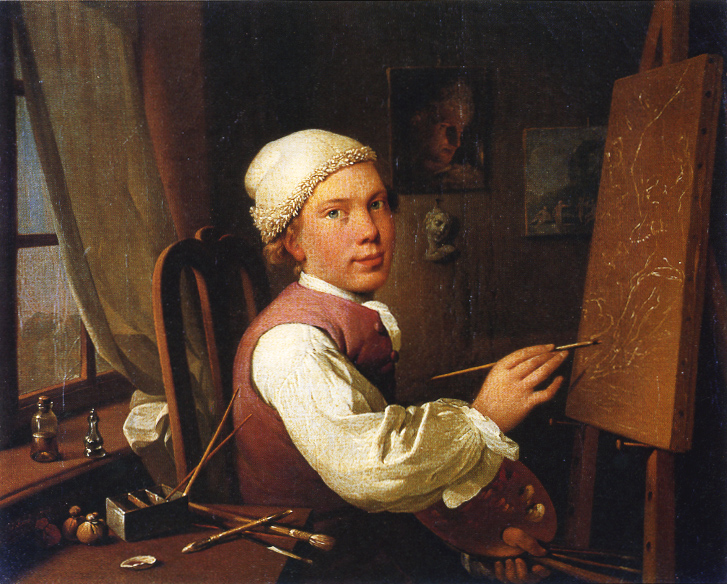
- Self-Portrait at the Easel (1766)
- Born: 12 May 1745; Falster, Denmark
- Died: 27 December 1802 (aged 57); Copenhagen, Denmark
- Education: Royal Danish Academy of Fine Arts
- Known for: Painting

Jens Juel (12 May 1745 – 27 December 1802) was a Danish painter, primarily known for his many portraits, of which the largest collection is on display at Frederiksborg Castle. He is regarded as the leading Danish portrait painter of the 18th century.

== Early life and career ==
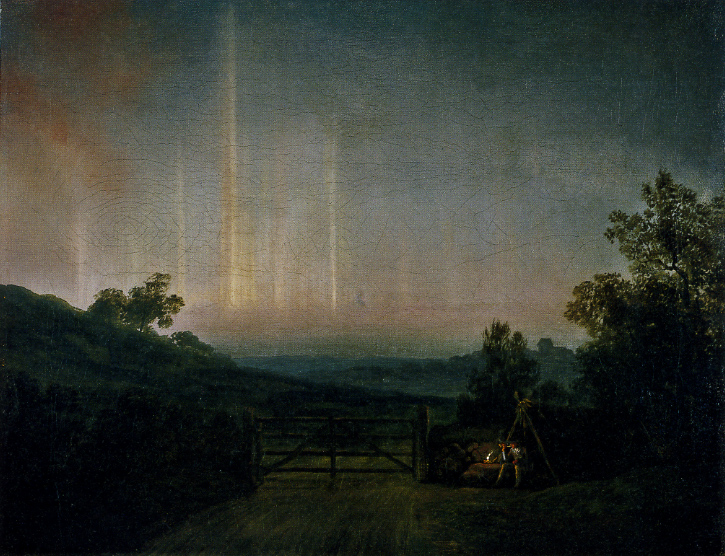
Landscape with Northern Lights - Attempt to Paint the Aurora Borealis, 1790s.

Jens Juel was born on 12 May 1745, in the house of his mother's brother Johan Jørgensen, who was a school teacher in Balslev on the island of Funen. Jens Juel was the son of Vilhelmine Elisabeth Juel (January 1725 – March 1799), who served at Wedellsborg, and Jørgen Jørgensen (1724 – 4 June 1796), who was a schoolmaster in Gamborg, not far from Balslev, and he grew up in Gamborg.

Juel showed an interest in painting from an early age, and his parents sent him to be an apprentice of painter Johann Michael Gehrman in Hamburg, where he worked hard for five or six years and improved so much that he acquired a reputation as a painter of portraits, landscapes, etc. During the time of his studies, he could live off painting landscapes, portraits and genre pictures. At just over twenty years old, he moved to Copenhagen to attend the Royal Danish Academy of Art. In 1767 he was awarded its small gold medal and in 1771 the great gold medal, both for Biblical themes.

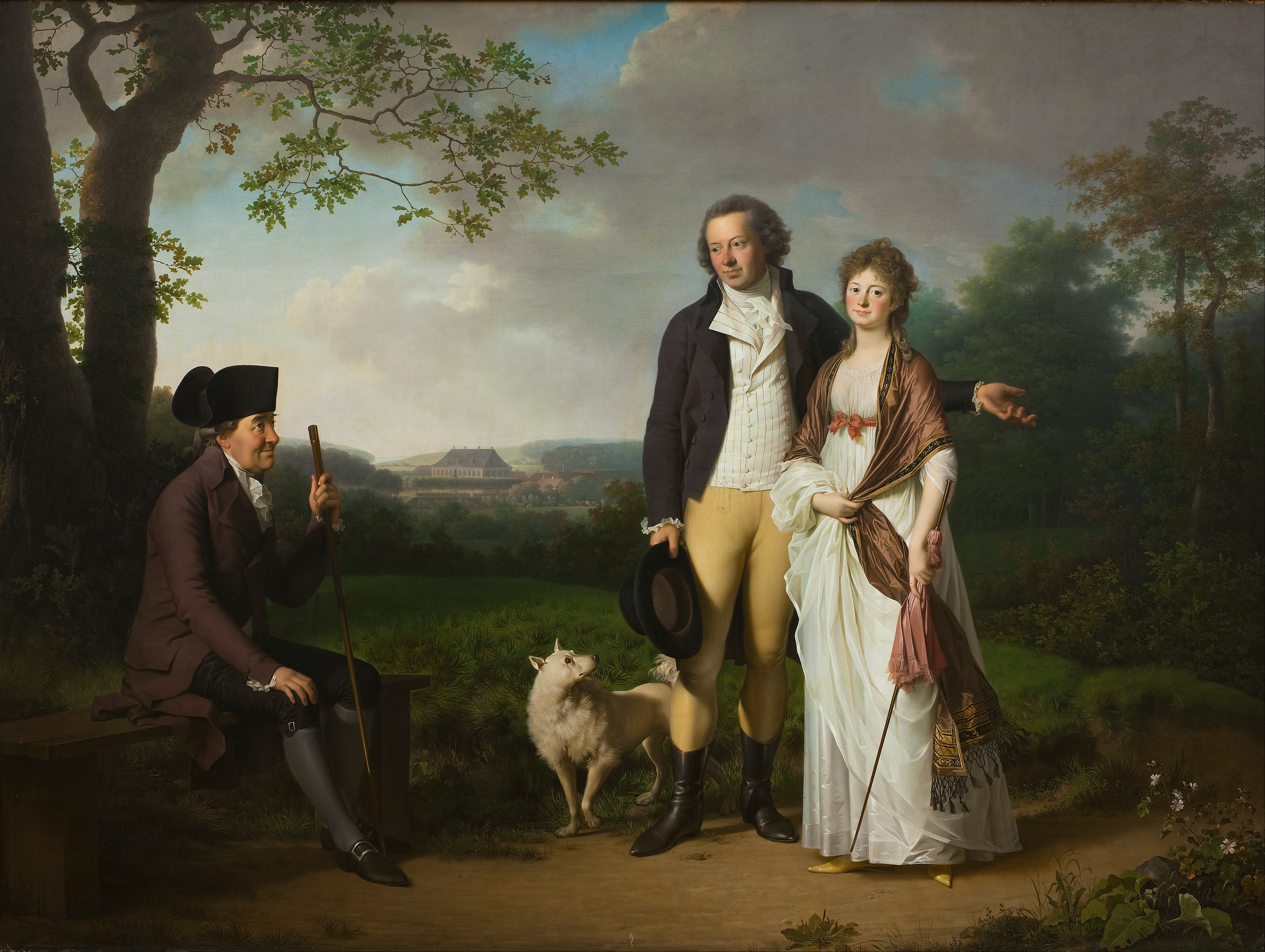
Niels Ryberg with his Son Johan Christian and his Daughter-in-Law Engelke, née Falbe

In 1772 Juel left Copenhagen, moving to Rome where he stayed for four years together with other Danish artists, including Nicolai Abildgaard. From Rome, he moved to Paris, at the time a center of portrait painting. In 1777 he moved on to Geneva, where he stayed for two years at the home of his friend Charles Bonnet in the company of other Danish artists, including etcher Johann Friderich Clemens. In Geneva, Juel soon earned a reputation as an excellent artist, and he painted many portraits. He illustrated with three other artists the Naturalist and philosophical History of Bonnet.

Through Bonnet, who had become an honorary member of the Danish Academy, his reputation reached Denmark. After a brief stay in Hamburg, where he met and painted a portrait of the poet Friedrich Gottlieb Klopstock, author of The Messiah, he returned to Copenhagen in 1780. Here he painted portraits for the royal house, nobility, and the well-to-do, as well as landscapes and genre paintings and was designated as the court painter.

On 4 April 1782, he was unanimously elected to be a member of the Danish Academy by Mandelberg, Weidenhaupt, and Abildgaard. He became the director of the Academy in 1795 and continued in the position until his death. He died on 27 December 1802 in Copenhagen.

Juel is buried at Assistens Cemetery in Copenhagen.

== Gallery ==
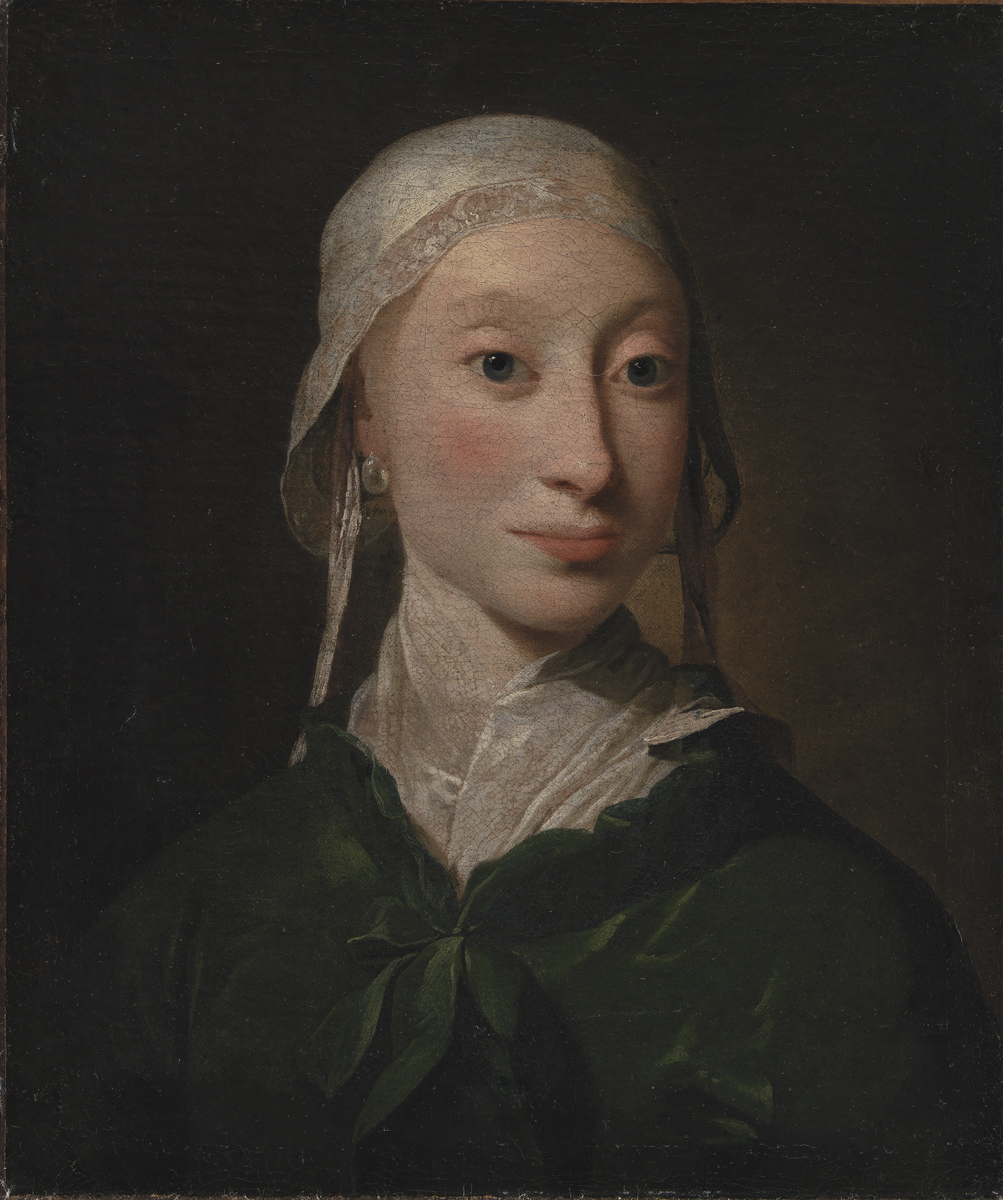
A Girl from Holstein, 1766/1767

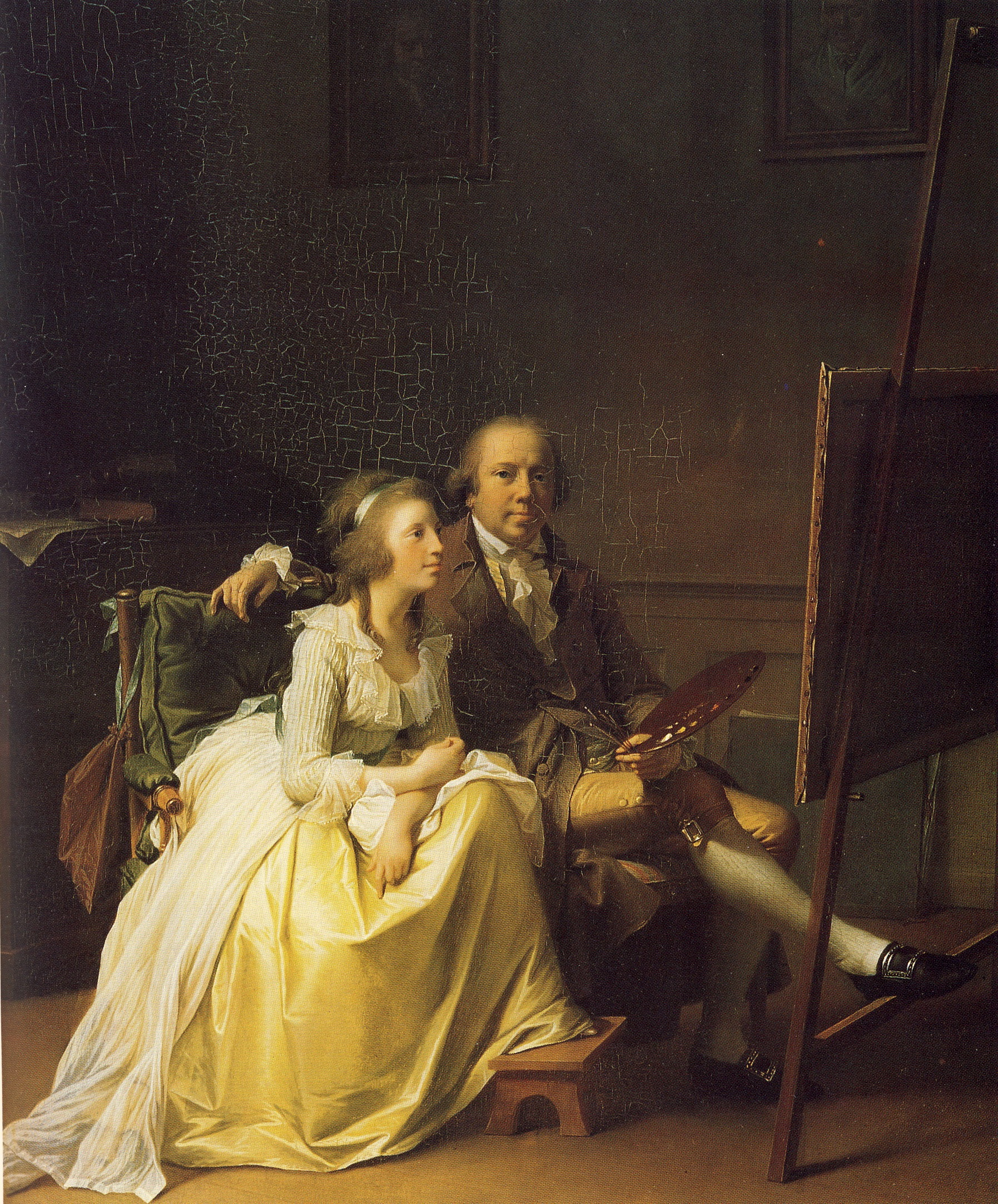
The Artist and his Wife Rosine, née Dørschel, 1791

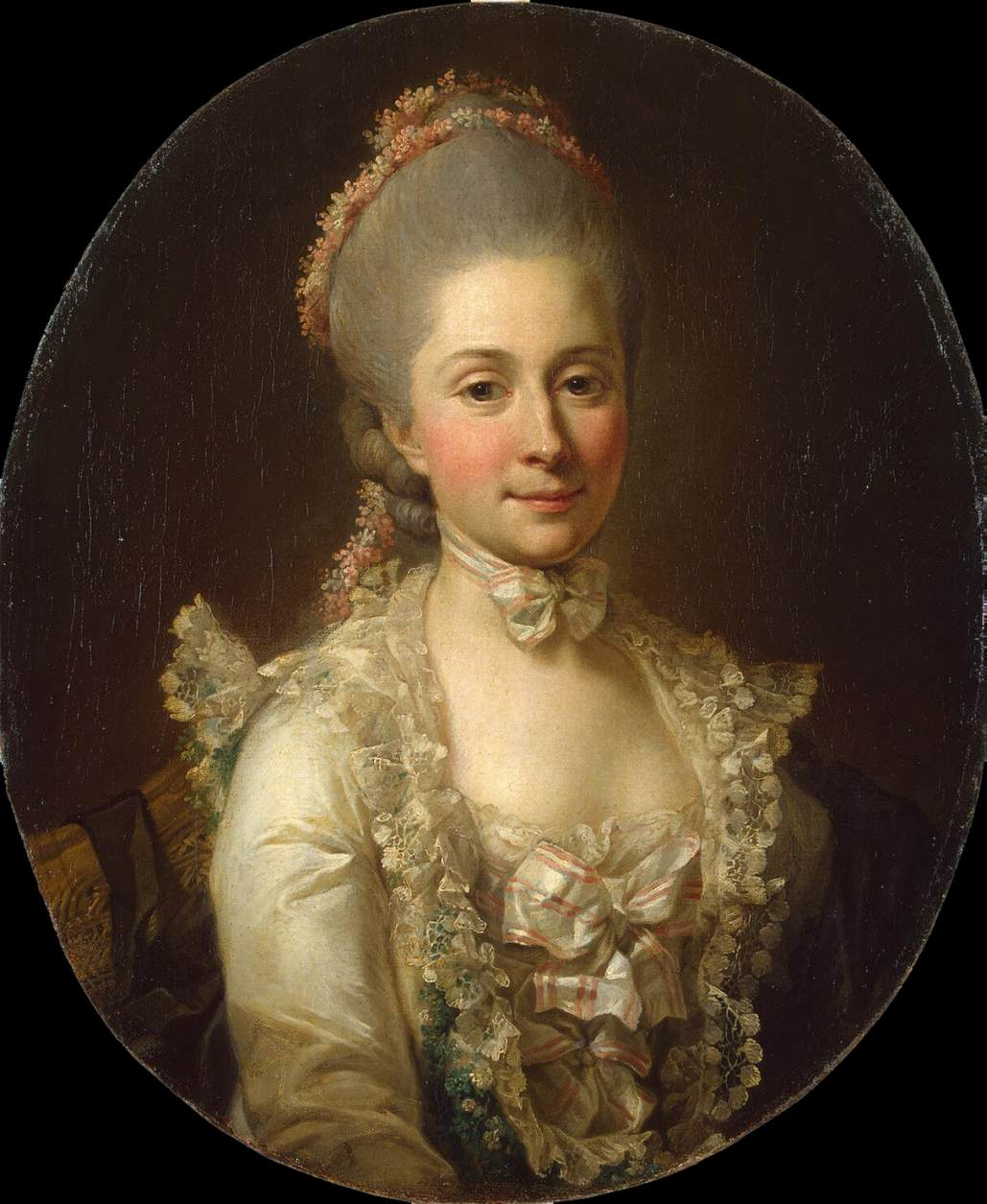
Portrait of Ekaterina Petrovna Shuvalova, 1773/1774

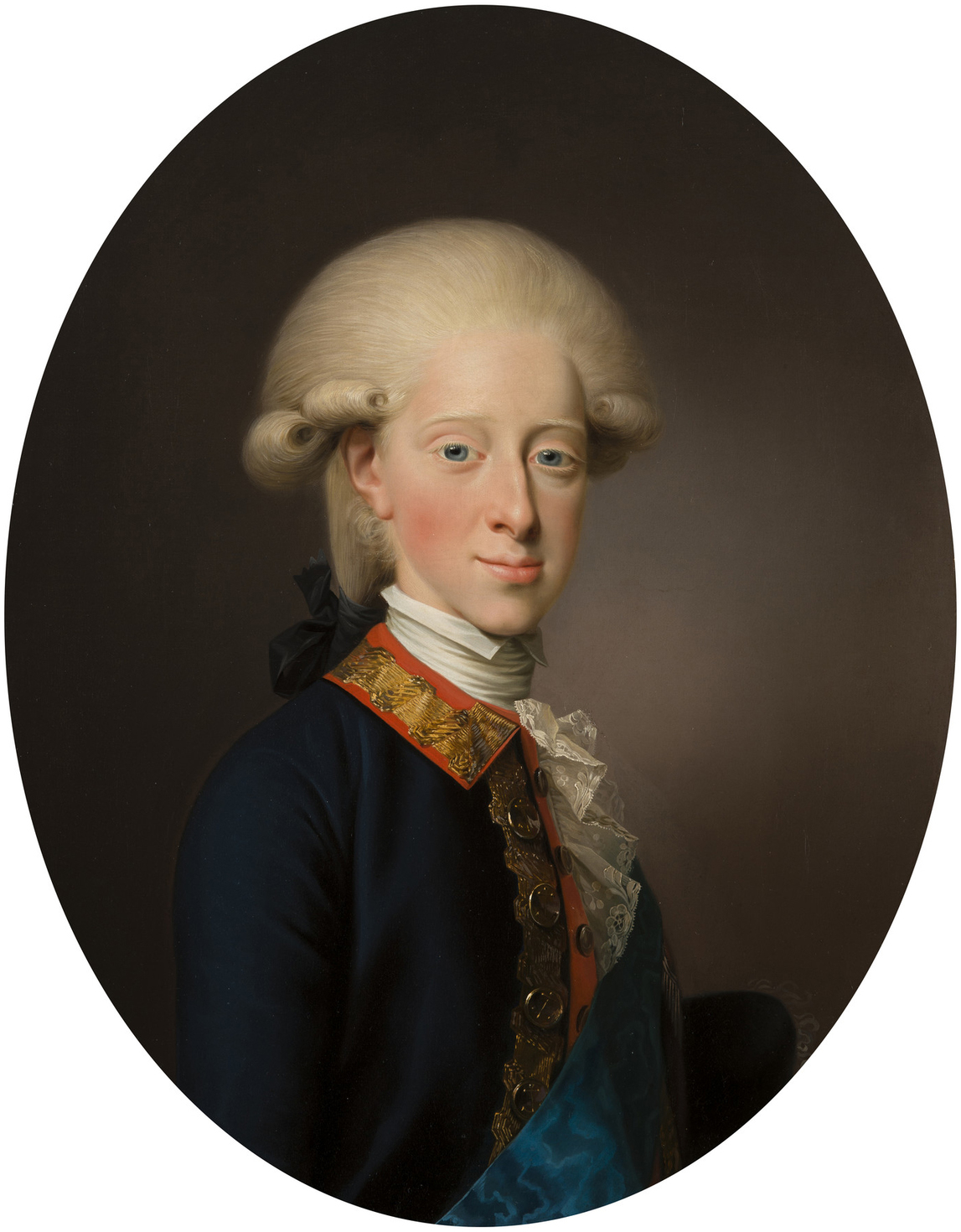
Frederik VI of Denmark, 1784

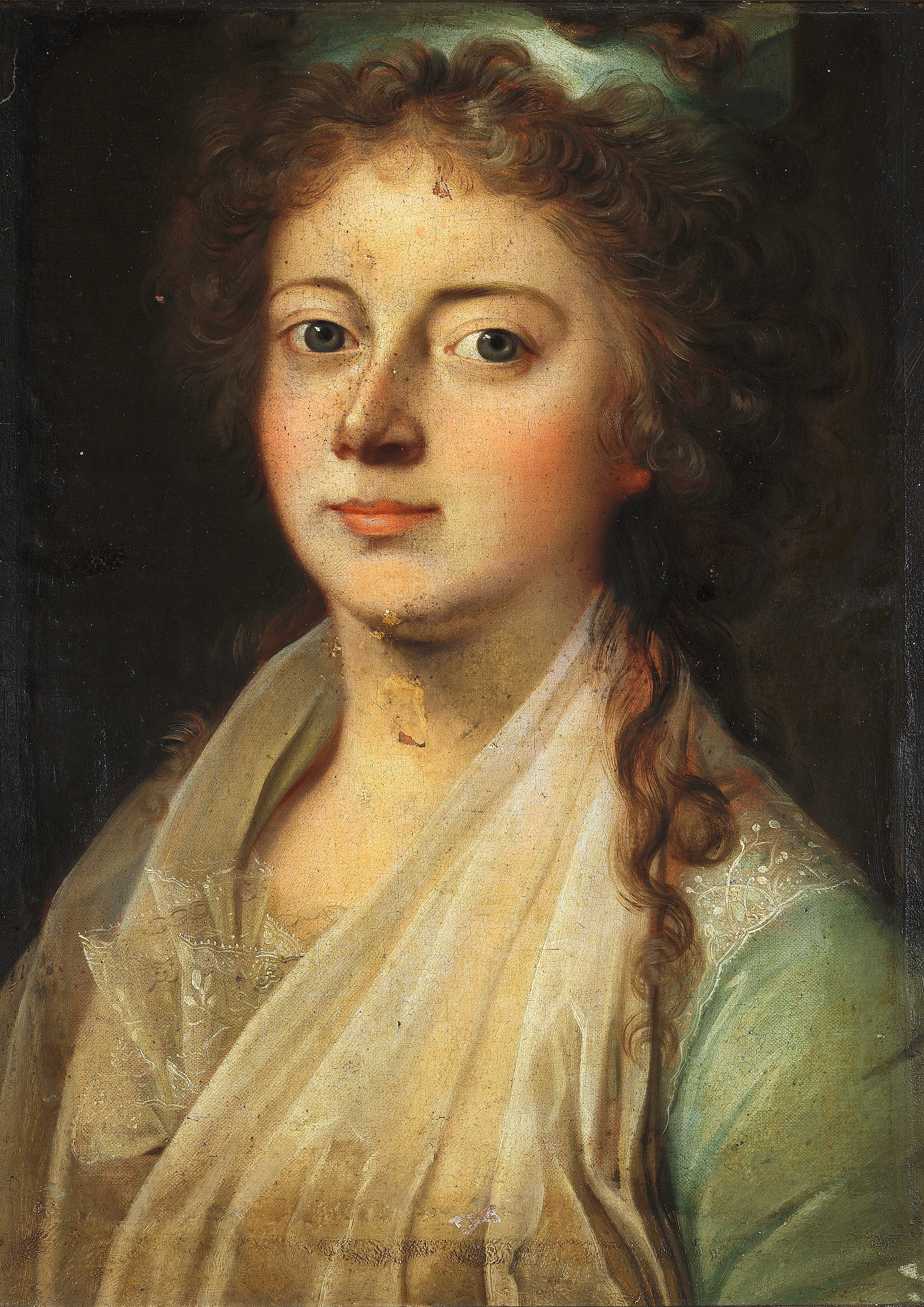
Portrait of Marie of Hesse-Kassel, 1790s

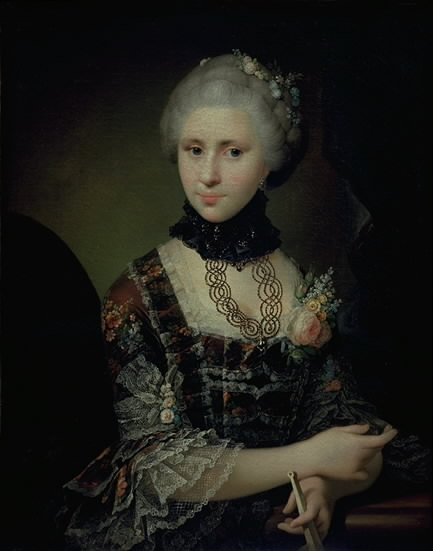
Cathrine Sophie Kirchhoff, f. Christensen, 1768

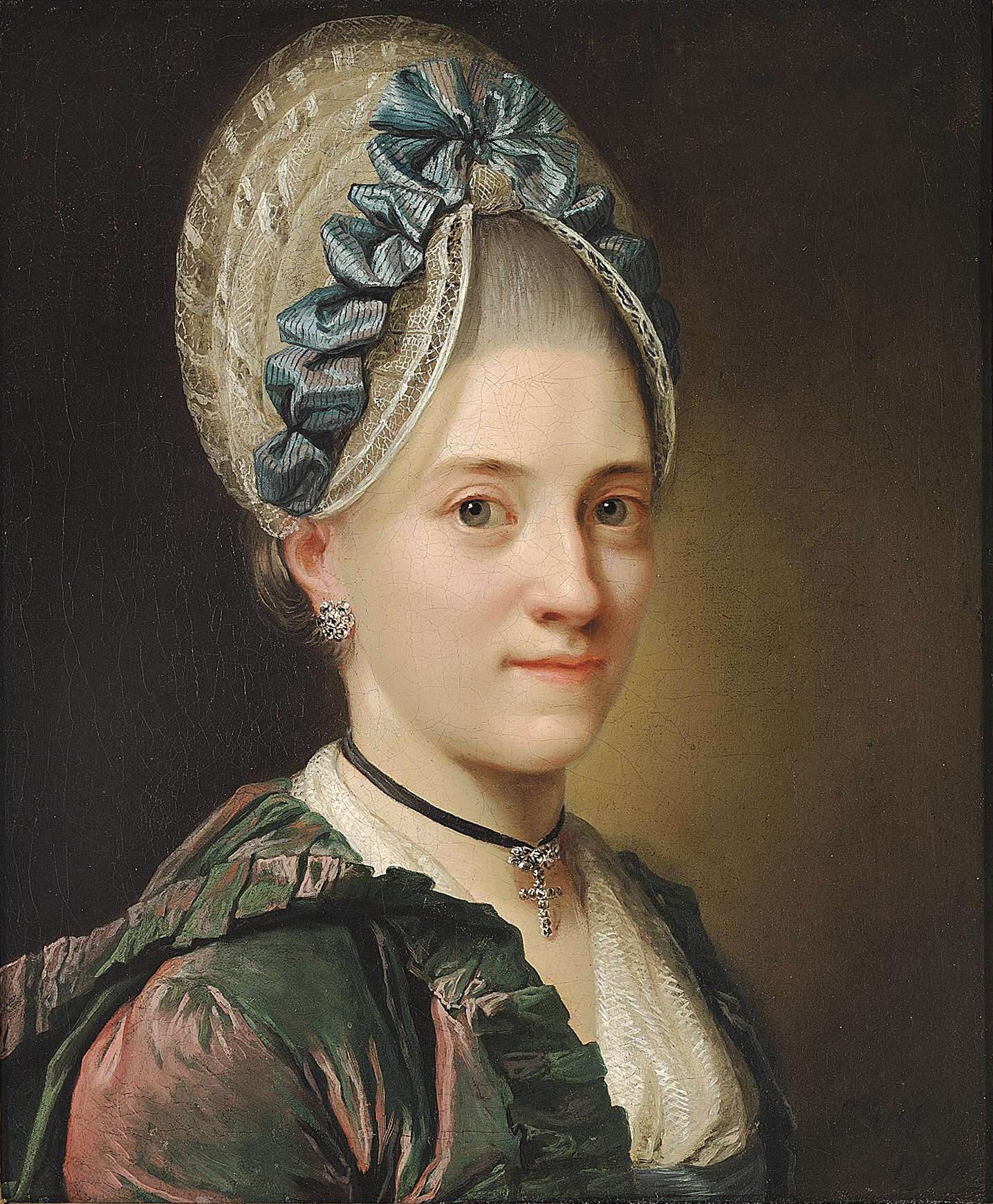
Portrait of Johanne Georgia Lund, née Liebenberg, 1771

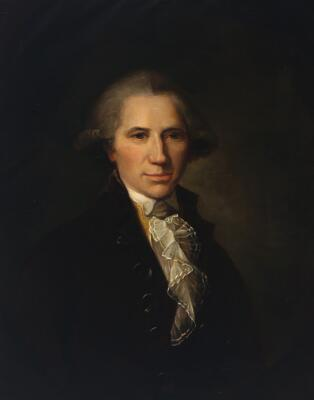
Portrait of Christian Colbjørnsen

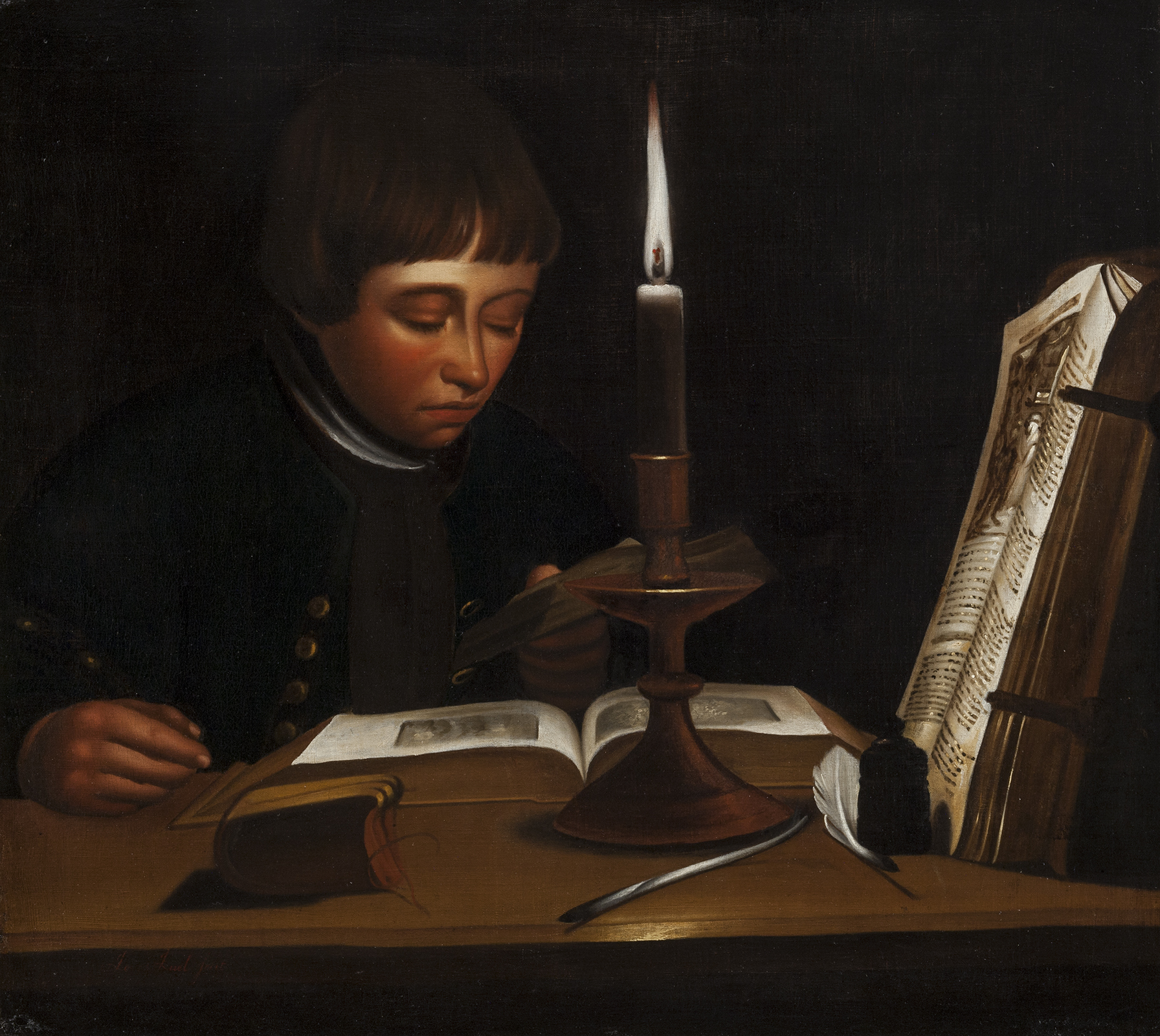
Boy Reading at Artificial Light, 1763/1764

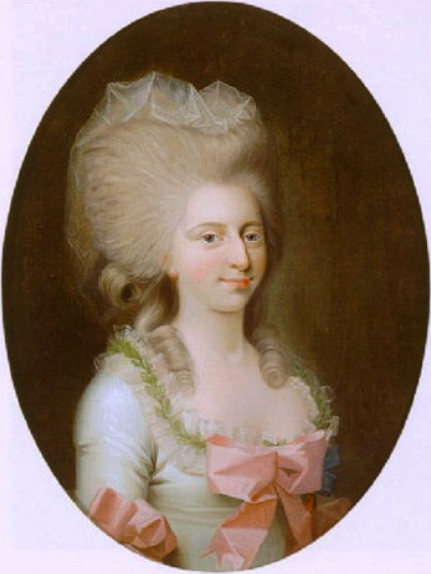
Portrait of Princess Louise Auguste of Denmark (1771-1843), wife of Frederick Christian II, Duke of Schleswig-Holstein-Sonderburg-Augustenburg (1765-1814)

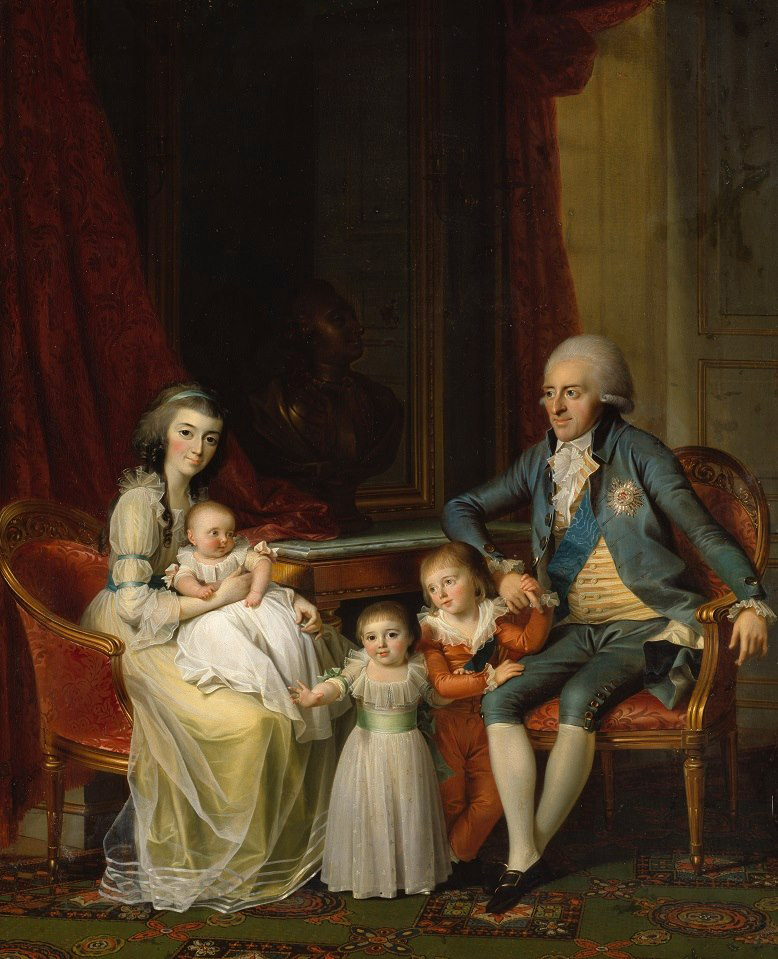
Frederick, Hereditary Prince of Denmark with his wife Duchess Sophia Frederica of Mecklenburg-Schwerin and their children, Christian, Juliane and Louise, 1790

== See also ==
- Art of Denmark

== Sources ==
- Kent, Neil (2003). "Juel, Jens". Grove Art Online.

Cultural offices
Preceded by Johannes Wiedewelt	Director of the Royal Danish Academy of Fine Arts; 1795–1797	Succeeded by Peter Meyn
Preceded by Peter Meyn	Director of the Royal Danish Academy of Fine Arts; 1799–1801	Succeeded by Nikolaj Abraham Abildgaard
