= Simon Kine =

Simon Kine (Simon Cow) (~1190-1245) was a liegeman, and steward during the reign of King Haakon IV of Norway. Before the death of Philip Simonsson he was a Bagler. He appears as a captain leading men against the Ribbalds in 1222 AD. along with Thord Draffle, and Thorfin the Bad. Simon Kine was summoned from the bay to a meeting of the Magnates of the land in 1223 AD. At yule of 1223 AD. he did homage to king Haakon and became his liegeman/vassal. When the king sailed to Tønsberg in 1224 Simon Kine with Arnbjorn Johnson and other stewards and liegeman came with him. Later in the same year while Haakon was planning his invasion of Värmland he sent word to Simon, Bard Toughstone, Halvard Downright, and other bay-dwellers to meet him in the marches. Along with Halvard he led six hundred men to the marches as the king had commanded him, quite a significant number of men to command t this time in this region. In 1225 when the ribbungs sent word for peace in exchange for a share of the kingdom king Haakon gives a speech in which he says he will not share the kingdom out because he believes it is his right to hold the entire kingdom. After making the speech he directly addresses Arnbjorn Johnson and Simon Kine. Simon responds:

"It is known to no man so well as to me that we did not serve that Erling who we saw on the stone wall in Vissing-Isle; but still this man seemed good to me while I was with him."

Haakon gives the speech because there appears to be some reluctance in continuing the already prolonged state of civil war. Simon states that Sigurd Ribbung was not the son of Erling Steinvegg but he was a good man when he met him. The Lawman Askel, and the king continue to question him about an allegedly false Erling Stonewall because he was "in close quarters" with him. Simon responds with an oath:

"I know before god that this is known to me, for I sat in the stonewall with Erling, and this was not that Erling. But we served him because we wished to get someone who would stand fast against the Birchshanks.

In 1226 AD. he dragged thirteen ships with Arnbjorn Johnson up the Elf (Elverum?) to the king. Later that year he led a company of 300 men against the Ribbalds at a place called Befja winning a small victory over them. In 1228 when one of Skule Bårdsson's men named Roi Halkelson slew a kingsman named Olaf the White he along with Arnbjorn Johnson lead a group of liegemen and handbound men to a house where the earl's supporters were staying at and began yelling and threatening to do harm. The king came and put the matter to rest by making peace between the two sides. In 1233 he was one of the vassals summoned by the king to form an army to oppose Knut Haakonsson claims to the throne whose wife Ingrid was a relative of Skule, and because she had recently died now his friendship with the earl and the king had broken. In 1235 he was one of the nine major liegemen (including Arnbjorn Johnson) who sailed with the king out of Bergen.

In 1239 amidst the fighting against Skule Bårdsson he raised 50 men and killed a man named Veseti at Hellir at a manor called Solbjargir upon the advice of Knut Haakonson who by this time had come over to the king. In 1240 he was with the king in the fight against the Wolf-Skins (Norwegian Civil War) and was given the task of guarding bridges and fords.
