= Endrid Bookling =

Courtier, captain, and steward

Endrid Bookling (born c. 1180) was a Norwegian courtier, captain, and steward loyal to Skule Bårdsson. In 1217 he was one of the messengers sent to represent the Baglers in their peace negotiations after the death of their leader Philip Simonsson. Later he paid homage to King Haakon IV along with fellow Bagler captains such as Arnbjorn Johnson, Simon Kine, and Gudolf of Blakkasteads. He was appointed as joint-steward of Gudbrandsdalen in 1218 AD. From 1222 to 1223 he was present at a meeting of noblemen and clergy in Bergen. He was one of many from the uplands who advised Skule to press his claim to the throne.
