= Munan Byskopson =

Nobleman, steward, and liegeman

Munan Byskopson (c. 1200 – 1260), was a 13th-century nobleman, steward, and liegeman loyal to Haakon IV of Norway. He was the son of a bishop, he had a brother Sigurd Byskopson. In 1235 the king sent him a letter instructing him to Arnbjorn Johnson and combine forces until they knew what the result of a diplomatic message to Earl Skule Bårdsson would be. By 1240 he was the Steward of Hedmark. He had fled in 1240 from the Wolf-Skins and linked up with Ogmund Crouchdance. He subsequently split with Ogmund and marched to the North Dales where he stayed for some time. In the Spring of 1240 he seized an abbot who had been sent by Skule Bårdsson requesting help from foreign princes; he had heard the abbot was engaging in skullduggery beforehand. After catching the abbot he waited in Bergen with the queen to deliver the news to Haakon. In 1247 he was one of the 9 liegeman in service to the king at the kings Coronation; he served wine to the archbishop, perhaps due to his parentage.
