= Ogmund Crouchdance =

Norwegian baron

- Sysselman (Governor) of Orkdal

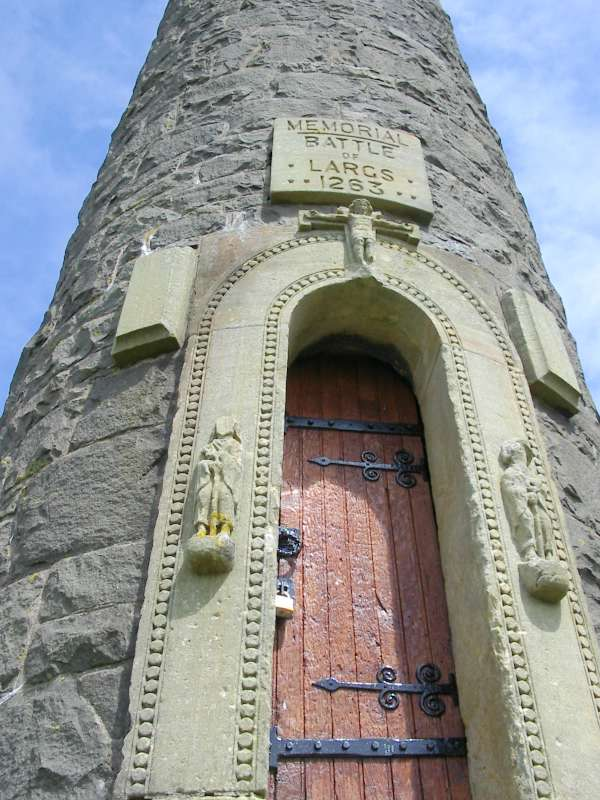
Memorial to the Battle of Largs in North Ayrshire, Scotland

Ogmund Crouchdance (Old Norse: Ǫgmund Krøkidans) was a lendmann - a Norwegian noble in the 13th century and Sysselman (Governor) of Orkdal under the kings Håkon IV of Norway and Magnus VI of Norway. His nickname Crouchdance is probably derived from the name of a Norwegian medieval dance.

Ogmund was one of King Håkon IV's most loyal lendmenn. He fought at King Håkon's side during the rebellion of duke Skule Bårdsson in May 1240. Skule was defeated by King Haakon and his supporters and with the death of Skule, the civil war era in Norway came to an end.

Ogmund was also a leader of a contingent of the Norwegian forces who ravaged Halland in 1256. In 1261 he was one of the leaders of the Norwegian delegation who took princess Ingebjørg Eiriksdotter, the daughter of Eric IV of Denmark, out of the convent in Horsens (dominikanerkloster ved Horsens) to bring her to Norway as the bride of the king's son, Magnus Håkonsson.

In 1263, King Håkon armed a great force and traveled to the land of Scotland, to protect the Hebrides and to attack the Scottish mainland, which had been under attack from King Alexander III of Scotland. Ogmund took part in King Håkon's expedition and led a contingent of the Norwegian forces at the Battle of Largs on the Firth of Clyde in Scotland. Both the Norwegians and the Scots claimed victory in this battle.

== Sources ==
The main source of the life and career of Ogmund Crouchdance is Håkon Håkonssons saga.
