= Botulf Botulfsson =

Swedish man executed for heresy

Botulf Botulfsson (died April 1311), from Gottröra, Uppland, was a Swedish man burned at the stake for heresy. His is the only confirmed case of an execution for heresy by the Catholic Church in Sweden.

He was accused by the Catholic Church of heresy after having denied that the wine and bread of the communion were literally the blood and body of Christ.

== First incident ==
When the inspection journey of archbishop Nils Allesson in the autumn of 1303 reached the parish of Gottröra, the local priest, Father Andreas, reported to him a case of heresy. One of the people of his congregation, the peasant Botulf from Östby, had one day after communion said that he did not believe that the wine and bread of communion was the blood and body of Christ. This was a severe crime against the law of the Church, which had decided to support and make a doctrine of the view that the wine and bread of the communion was not only symbolically but literally turned to the blood and body of Christ in 1215. The archbishop had himself studied this in Germany, France, and at the curia in Rome in the 1290s and was eager to see this idea accepted in Sweden.

Botulf was called upon and interrogated by the archbishop in church; eventually he admitted having said what the priest claimed and then, according to the documents, very quickly said that he now realised that what he said was dangerous heresy and that he deeply regretted having said it. He was then made to take back what he had said in front of the congregation and was sentenced by the archbishop to a penance of seven years, after which he was to be taken back to the congregation and to receive communion again.

== Second incident ==
Seven years later, in the spring of 1310, Botulf traveled by foot to Uppsala, where he was released from the penance by the new archbishop Nils Kettilsson. On 19 April 1310, he went to church to receive communion by Father Andreas, the same priest who had reported him in 1303. When Botulf kneeled in front of the priest, the priest asked him: "Well, Botulf, now I am sure that you believe that the bread is the body of Christ?" Botulf was then to have raised his head, looked the priest straight in the eye, and firmly answered:

"No. If the bread were truly the body of Christ you would have eaten it all yourself a long time ago. I do not want to eat the body of Christ! I do not mind showing obedience to God, but I can only do so in a way which is possible for me. If someone were to eat the body of another, would not that person take vengeance, if he could? Then how much would not God take vengeance, he who truly has the power to do so?"

Botulf was to have said this very quickly, "vomited out his sinfullness", according to the terrified priest, who added that he said much more than this, but that the priest could not bring himself to write it down. The priest reported it all to the archbishop, who called Botulf to Uppsala, but Botulf never showed up.

On 11 November the archbishop was on an inspection in Närtuna church close to Gottröra. During the procession towards the church, Father Andreas noticed Botulf in the crowd and pointed him out to the archbishop. Botulf was quickly taken by the bishop's men to the archbishop, who asked him if the things Father Andreas said about him were true. Botulf, according to the documents, answered: "I have said so, and I do not deny saying it."

Botulf was put on trial in Skepptuna Church, the next stop on the journey. Thirteen of his neighbors were called as witnesses and questioned by Israel Erlandsson, prior of the Dominican Abbey in Sigtuna. The witnesses confirmed that Botulf several times stated his opinions in front of others. Botulf was now banished for one year, during which he was taken to a clerical prison in Uppsala. During the imprisonment, he was informed that if he did not take back his opinions, he was to be burned. Upon hearing this, he answered: "That fire will pass after but a short moment." This answer made the archbishop convinced that he was an incorrigible heretic, and after the year had passed, the archbishop, "Rising in the virtue of Jesus Christ", judged Botulf as a heretic on 8 April 1311. As was the custom with trials of heresy in southern Europe, he was then turned over to a secular court, which was to carry out the sentence of the church.

A paper, Botulf-bladet, is named after him; it is a humanistic paper against religious oppression.

== Other cases of heresy ==
This is the only known execution for heresy in Sweden. However, in 1442, a man called Hemming came to the Vadstena Abbey and showed the monks articles that he claimed were dictated by the Virgin Mary. The articles were deemed to go against the teachings of the church, and he was sentenced by the bishop in Linköping to Jejunia (fasting) and was chained in a dungeon. The starvation quickly made him retract everything. He was paraded with a heap of wood on his back and burning candles in his hands to symbolize the sentence he had been spared from, and he declared that he deserved to be burned if he should ever fall back into his sin. After this his articles were read to him, and he denounced them in Vadstena.

In 1492, Eric Clauesson was burned for being a follower of the Old Norse religion, which could be considered a heresy trial.
