= Nils Allesson =

Archbishop of Uppsala from 1292 to 1305

Nils Allesson (Latin: Nicolaus Allonius) was Archbishop of Uppsala 1292–1305.

== Biography ==
According to the Archbishop's Chronicle, he was born in Uppsala. It is believed that he studied at the University of Paris in 1278. After returning to Sweden, he became deacon in Uppsala in 1286 and was elected archbishop in 1292 following the death of Archbishop Johannes who died during 1291. At this time, the cathedral chapter in Uppsala was in a dispute with Jens Grand, Archbishop of Lund, who had primate status over the archbishop of Uppsala. The Archbishop did not approve of Nils Allesson and appealed the election to Rome. This occurred during a period without a valid Pope elected due to a deadlock among cardinals. Nils later travelled to Rome to be ordained in 1295 by Pope Boniface VIII.

Nils was known as a vigorous archbishop. He founded and supervised institutions for safety and order, such as accommodations for travelers around his diocese. In 1303, he participated in the first trial against Botulf Botulfsson for heresy. The same year, he opened the shrine of Eric the Saint and provided some relics to Duke Eric, the son of King Magnus Ladulås.

== See also ==
- List of archbishops of Uppsala

== Other sources ==
- Åsbrink, Gustav & Westman, Knut B. Svea rikes ärkebiskopar från 1164 till nuvarande tid (Bokförlaget Natur och Kultur, Stockholm 1935)
