= Ivar Nosy =

Liegeman of Haakon IV of Norway

Ivar Nosy (C. 1190-1250) was a Norwegian Liegeman, Commander, and Messenger.

He became a Liegeman in Yule 1217-1218 for King Haakon IV of Norway alongside John Steel (Liegeman). In 1220 he was one of the three liegeman who came to help against the Ribbalds (alongside John Steel (Liegeman) and Paul Barrowpole. In 1221 he gave the king a twenty bencher ship to fight the Ribbalds. In 1222 the king sent a letter requesting his presence along with Gregory Johnsson. In 1223 he was one of the liegemen present at the meeting to address King Haakon's legitimacy along with Paul Flida, Peter Flida, Brynjulf Canutesson, and Gaut of Mel.

In 1225 he was the leader of a contingent of kings men who were defeated by the Ribbalds. When he met the king after the rout of his men he told the king:

"And then came men of the Ribbalds, and I did not know how many they were, and they marched close together but we split up, for we were not aware that we should be so soon in coming on them. And when we met we could scarcely get out our weapons to defend ourselves, for the wood was thick; and next after that my men ran off into the wood and sheltered themselves with it; but I got my horse turned and some men with me, and we rode along the way."

In 1227 he is revealed to be a kinsman of Nicholas Paulsson (probably a brother) when the kings bodyguard takes him prisoner and nearly kills him because of the conflict they had with Nicholas Paulsson; Ivar is only saved by the king.

In 1235 he was one of the nine Liegemen with the king during the conflict escalation with Skule Bårdsson. In 1235 he is mentioned as being sent as a messenger with Paul Barrowpole to Skule Bardson by the king asking him to come and settle matters with the king.
