= John Steel (liegeman) =

Norwegian warrior and liegeman

John Steel (c. 1170-1230) was a Norwegian warrior, likely of noble birth, who fought under King Sverre Sigurdsson and became a liegeman, or vassal, under King Haakon IV of Norway.

== Enlistment ==
John Steel was enlisted as a liegeman in 1217 (alongside Ivar Nosy) by King Haakon IV of Norway and Earl Skule Bårdsson. An early controversy arose between the king and the earl over whose right it was to rule, and it was rumored that the Earl Bårdsson's men would arrive at King Haakon's castle armed. Steel supported King Haakon's claim, and was appointed by the King to ensure Haakon's supporters would be armed as well.

In 1219, Steel presented the king with a ship that he had ordered to be built. The King treasured this ship throughout the rest of his reign.

== Attack on the Ribbalds ==
In the summer of 1220, John Steel was one of three liegemen who attacked the Ribbalds alongside Haakon. The Ribbalds were English soldiers considered to be more fierce than Berserkers. Originally starting with a "fair breeze off Jadar", they spent half a month in Lykr and consequently ran low on provisions. They resorted to taking cattle from nearby farms. The forces eventually split into two groups, led by the earl and the king. John, Gautr Johnsson, and Dagfinn the Yeomen all accompanied the king at this time. The Ribbalds believed they were going to battle the smaller ships owned by Dagfinn and the other liegeman and not the king's larger ships. The smaller ships were left in plain sight in the bay to bait the Ribbalds while the larger ships were hidden. Despite this well-orchestrated plan, the Ribbalds were able to reach land and escape.

== Supporting King Haakon IV ==
In 1223, there was a meeting in Bergen to address King Haakon IV of Norway's claims to kingship against Skule Bardsson. John Steel was one of the king's liegemen invited to the meeting alongside Paul Flida, Peter Flida, Gautr Johnsson, and Ivar Nosy. During the meeting, he gave a short speech:

"We thought, we old Birchshanks when we underwent most toil with King Sverre of Norway and stood it out against many bands that there would be no need of such talk as this; for we all fought to save his inheritance for himself and his offspring. But it is not wonderful (it's no wonder) in some way after all that Earl Skule pursues this quarrel; for we have heard that those lawmen are nowhere inside this hall who told the Earl that he was the rightful heir to the kingdom after King Ingi, and this is spoken for you, Amundi Cockscomb and Eystein Roarsson, as ye sit there on the bench."

Steel revealed his past in this speech; he was a loyal veteran of King Sverre's army and referred to several lawmen who advised Skule to push his claim to the throne after his brother. Cockscomb denied encouraging Skule and Roarsson to follow him. Arnbjorn Johnson proceeded to make a jest that the lawmen were probably drunk when they said it or had been bribed, showing that he agreed with John Steel.

== Mourning Thomas Becket ==
Steel was mentioned again in 1225, when King Haakon saw his ship returning to England to mourn Thomas Becket.

== Son Brnjolf ==
In 1235, Steel's son Brnjolf was mentioned as one of the reasons why Skule did not want to meet with the king. By this time, John probably would have been dead, the son continued his strong loyalty to Haakon. According to Skule's account, Brynjolf Steel had sworn "the guardsman's oath" to the king.
