= Dagfinn the Yeoman =

Norwegian noble (c.1175 - c.1233)

Dagfinn the Yeoman (c. 1175 - C. 1233), or Dagfinn Bondir, was a warrior, liegeman, Law man of Gulating, and Marshal of Haakon IV of Norway. His background is uncertain but he was likely the son of a Yeoman (based on his name).

== Life ==
He fought for King Sverre of Norway at the Battle of Floravoe (1194), and the Battle of Johnsfields. In 1217 he was sent to Trondheim by the king to announce that King Haakon was the new King of Norway. According to his letters:

But if ye men of Drontheim will in any way put forward those men

who are your kinsmen or foster-brothers, though
they may have some kinship or trace their pedigree
to the kings, and so should each of them follow
their kinsmen or foster-brothers, then it may be

that there will be soon very many ness-kings (petty kings).

— Dagfin

It is unclear to what degree the letter indulges in flattery of the peoples' bloodline or simply to deter rival claimants. After reading the letter Dagfinn made a speech to gather support for Haakon.

=== Messenger ===
He often served as a messenger and when messengers delivering a letter from Skule Bardsson to a magnate found out that he had used the king's seal, they told Dagfinn to pass it onto the king.

=== Haakon ===
Later he was sent to seek the support of the Archbishop of Nidaros along with Gregorious Jonson. After he was ejected from a meeting with the archbishop due to doubts about Haakon's birth, Dagfinn advised Haakon to hold a meeting with the loyal magnates of the land in Bergen in 1218 to establish his legitimacy. Dagfinn had a leading role in the meeting and spoke in Haakon's defense, acting as his chief councilor.

Earl Skule Bardsson and the Archbishop of Nidaros challenged Haakon to a trial by ordeal which involved hot irons. Haakon accepted to prove his legitimacy. On the night before the trial a Smith named Sigar of Brabant in Earl Skule Bardsson's Retinue offered Dagfinn a special herb supposed to help the burn. Dagfinn turned him down claiming Haakon would not need it because he was not lying, showing himself to be clever and honest. The trial ended in success for Haakon. Later Dagfinn was involved in a naval skirmish with Skule Bårdsson. During the fight Dagfinn told the earl on behalf of the king that it was better for him if he agreed to peace, because they would not give up. In combination with Haakon's offer of Atonement (probably involving financial compensation) for the death of one of the Earl's kinsmen, Gunnolf, Skule agreed to a truce.

In 1219 AD. Dagfinn was sent to Tønsberg to make ready for the king's visit. Dagfinn was one of five councilors who wrote to his son Arnbjorn Jonsson and Paul Barrowpole asking for support against the regent Bårdsson. He was one of two lawmen of the Gulating and in his capacity as lawman he proclaimed that Haakon was the only legitimate king of Norway. Dagfinn generally tried to inspire peace between Bårdsson and Haakon. Haakon was supposed to married Bardsson's daughter but he was delayed due to strife in the bay and sent Dagfinn as a messenger to the Earl to inform him. In 1225 he sailed to Haakon and asked to join him on his march to Värmland, but the king instructed him to stay behind and ensure his son Sigurd would inherit the throne if he did not return.

While returning to Bergen from Oslo he suffered from the cold and had to stay with the Southmen to avoid the Ribbalds. In 1233 he was still making speeches for the king and was by his side but he apparently died soon after, aged at least 58.
