= Battle of Oslo =

Battle of Oslo may refer to:

- Battle of Oslo (1161)
- Battle of Oslo (1218)
- Battle of Oslo (1239)
- Battle of Oslo (1308)

== See also ==
- Battle of Oslo (football) – the football derby between FC Lyn Oslo and Vålerenga Fotball
- The Battle of Oslo - English title of the Norwegian war film Blücher.
