= Lendmann =

Title in medieval Norway

Lendmann (plural lendmenn; Old Norse: lendr maðr) was a title in medieval Norway. A lendmann had the highest rank attainable in the royal hird, that is, the secular aristocracy, standing beneath earls and dukes only. In the 13th century, there were between ten and twenty lendmenn at any one time. A lendmann was similar to the medieval English baron, itself corresponding to a modern count.

The term lendr maðr is first mentioned in skald poetry from the reign of king Olaf Haraldsson (reigned 1015–1028) in the early 11th century. The lendmenn had military and police as well as fiscal responsibilities for their districts. King Magnus VI Lagabøte (reigned 1263–1280) abolished the title, replacing it with baron. In 1308 Haakon V of Norway (reigned 1299–1319) abolished the baronial title as well.

Among his relatively sparse privileges, as stipulated by the Hirðskrá, a lendmann was allowed to keep a retinue of forty housecarls without special permission from the king. He was also entitled to an annual compensation paid in silver.

In English historical literature and translations, lendmann is often translated as landed man. The word literally means enfeoffed man, one who has received a fief in return for services to the king. The term lendmann is not to be confused with lensmann, the head of the local police in medieval and modern times, nor with the Danish lensmand, the holder of a fief, which in Norway commonly is known as lensherre.
