= Abildgaard =

Abildgaard is a Danish surname. Notable people with the surname include:

- Martin Abildgaard (born 2002), Danish gymnast
- Mette Abildgaard (born 1988), Danish politician
- Nicolai Abildgaard (1743–1809), Danish painter
- Oliver Abildgaard (born 1996), Danish footballer
- Ove Abildgaard (1916–1990), Danish poet
- Peter Christian Abildgaard (1740–1801), Danish physician and veterinarian
- Søren Abildgaard (1718–1791), Danish naturalist, writer and illustrator
- Theodor Abildgaard (1826–1884), one of the tenants of the thranite movement
