= Johan (archbishop of Uppsala, died 1291) =

Archbishop of Uppsala from 1290 to 1291

Johan was a Swedish priest and Dominican friar. He served as the Bishop of Turku from 1286 to 1290 and Archbishop of Uppsala from 1290 to 1291.

According to some sources, Johan was born in Poland, according to others in Uppsala. Before his assignment to Turku, he worked as the prior at the Dominican monastery in Sigtuna (Sigtuna dominikankonvent). He died in Avignon while travelling to Rome to receive the pallium.

== See also ==
- List of archbishops of Uppsala

== Other sources ==
- Tesch, Sten (1997) Mariakyrkan i Sigtuna dominikankonvent och församlingskyrka 1247-1997
- Åsbrink, Gustav & Westman, Knut B. (1935)Svea rikes ärkebiskopar från 1164 till nuvarande tid (Stockholm: Bokförlaget Natur och Kultur)
- Paulsson, Göte (1974) Annales Suecici medii aevi (Stockholm: Gleerup)
