= Sigurd Ribbung =

Pretender to the throne of Norway

Sigurd Erlingsson Ribbung (Old Norse: Sigurðr ribbungr) (died 1226) was a Norwegian nobleman and pretender to the throne of Norway during the civil war era in Norway.

== Biography ==
Sigurd Erlingsson's father was Erling Steinvegg, who claimed to be the son of King Magnus V. His claim was supported by the Bagler, a rebel group fighting the Birkebeiner supported king of Norway, Inge II. The Bagler never achieved control of all of Norway, but established their rule in Viken in the area of Oslofjord after 1204. When Erling died in 1207, he left two infant sons, Sigurd and his brother. They were passed over by the Bagler, in favour of Philip Simonsson, who became the new Bagler candidate. When Philip died in 1217, the Bagler and Birkebeiner were reconciled. The Bagler party dissolved, and the under-age Haakon IV became king of Norway, with jarl Skule Bårdsson as de facto ruler.

Not all Bagler were happy with the settlement. In 1218, disaffected elements raised a new rebellion. They were known as Ribbunger (sometimes translated to English as Ribalds). They tracked down Sigurd Erlingsson and declared him to be their candidate. At the time, men came of age at the age of 15 in Norway, so Sigurd was most likely under-age. As king of the Ribbunger, he became known as Sigurd Ribbung. The Ribbunger caused significant problems for the new regime in eastern Norway.

Fighting dragged on for several years, until Sigurd agreed to surrender to earl Skule in 1222 or 1223. As Skule's honored prisoner, Sigurd was present at a gathering of all the most powerful men of Norway, which was convened in Bergen in 1223 to finally settle who would be king. Sigurd was one of five candidates at the meeting, which ended by confirming King Haakon as ruler of Norway. Skule, who had also been one of the candidates, was now given Trøndelag as his part of the kingdom.

King Haakon took over more and more of the real royal power himself. Not long after, Sigurd made a daring escape from Skule Bårdsson's court in Nidaros, and made his way back to the Oslofjord, where he renewed his rebellion. King Haakon now took personal charge of quashing Sigurd's rising. Although he contained Sigurd in eastern Norway, he never managed to capture him. In 1226, Sigurd died in Oslo of natural causes. After Sigurd's death, the Ribbunger sought out another of the candidates for the throne, Knut Håkonsson, and declared him to be their new king. However, the rising was now a spent force, and Knut surrendered to King Haakon in 1227, ending the Ribbung rebellion.

== Historic content ==
In Norwegian civil war era it was usual that several royal sons fought against each other over power in Norway. The civil war period of Norwegian history lasted from 1130 to 1240. During this period there were several interlocked conflicts of varying scale and intensity. The background for these conflicts were the unclear Norwegian succession laws, social conditions and the struggle between Church and King. There were then two main parties, firstly known by varying names or no names at all, but finally condensed into parties of Bagler and Birkebeiner. The rallying point regularly was a royal son, who was set up as the head figure of the party in question, to oppose the rule of king from the contesting party.

== Primary source ==
The main source to Sigurd Ribbung's life and rebellion is Sturla Þórðarson's Saga of Håkon Håkonsson, which was written in the 1260s.

== Other sources ==
- Helle, Knut Under kirke og kongemakt, 1130-1350 (Oslo: 1995)
- Holmsen, Andreas Norges historie, fra de eldste tider til 1660 (Oslo: 1961)
- Gjerset, Knut History of the Norwegian People (MacMillan Company, Volumes I & II, 1915)
