= Knut Haakonsson =

Norwegian nobleman (c. 1208 – 1261)

Knut Haakonsson (Knut Håkonsson; Old Norse: Knútr Hákonarson; c. 1208 – 1261) was a Norwegian nobleman and claimant to the throne during the Civil war era in Norway.

== Biography ==
Haakonsson was born the son of jarl Haakon the Crazy (Håkon Galen) and Swedish noble-woman Kristina Nilsdotter. In 1223 the archbishop of Nidaros stated in a council of the realm that it was known by all that Knut was the lawfully begotten heir of Earl Haakon the Crazy, perhaps implying that he would have inherited the title of earl possibly of Värmland which his grandfather had held.

In 1226, upon the death of Sigurd Ribbung, Knut was chosen as the new pretender of the Ribbung party. The Ribbunger forces were soon beaten militarily. Knut resigned his pretender crown and made peace with King Haakon IV of Norway in 1227. He subsequently married Ingrid, a daughter of jarl Skule Baardsson, who had a form of power sharing with King Haakon.

Tensions between Skule Baardsson and King Haakon existed and in an effort to facilitate a compromise, Skule was given the title Duke in 1237. However, Skule rose to open revolt in 1239 and tried to win Knut over to his side. Knut rejected Skule's advances and remained loyal to King Haakon, who subsequently elevated him to jarl. Skule's rebellion met an unsuccessful end in 1240 and the duke was killed. After Skule's death, no one was able to challenge King Haakon's position in Norway.

For the rest of his life, Knut retained the title of jarl, which formally made him the highest ranking man in the country after the king and his sons. Whether he held much real power over affairs of state is doubtful. In September 1261, he carried the crown at the coronation ceremony of Haakon's son, King Magnus VI of Norway. Later that same year, Knut died and was buried in Bergen Cathedral.

== Sources ==
- Knut Peter Lyche Arstad. "Håkon Galen". Norsk biografisk leksikon.
- "Borgerkrigstida". lokalhistoriewiki.no.
