= Arnbjørn Jonsson =

13th-century liegeman of King Haakon IV of Norway

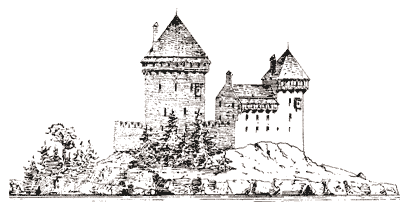
Valdisholm castle

Arnbjørn Jonsson (c. 1190–1240) was a prominent liegeman and retainer during the reign of King Haakon IV of Norway, serving as one of the king's chief commanders, the castellan of Valdisholm, and the steward of Skaun and Haggin.

== Life ==
In 1217 he was listed as one of the captains among the Baglers. He made peace with Haakon after Philip Simonsson died and was confirmed in one half of his lands.

In 1218, King Haakon's councillors sent word to Arnbjørn warning him that they did not trust Skule Bårdsson. Later in 1218 he accompanied the king during a skirmish with Skule. In 1221, he reported to the king that he heard the Ribbalds were gaining strength. In 1222, when those under Sigurd Ribbung were raising strife, Arnbjørn sent men under his lieutenant Helgi Fleshhen to kill the marauders led by the rebel commander Benny Skinknife, who tried to jump off his ship and hide but was found and killed. In 1223, during a meeting between Skule Bårdsson and Haakon discussing Skule's claims to the throne, Skule claimed that he was the rightful heir according to what the lawmen said of the customs of Saint Olaf II of Norway. As a supporter of the king, Arnbjørn is reported to have replied: "May be that our lawmen have said this when they had more in them of mead- less than of the laws of Saint Olaf. It may also be that bribes have come between them."

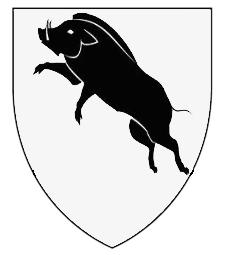
The Boar was the Ornes family coat of arms

In 1222 Arnbjørn was winning small skirmishes against the Ribbald leaders Herjolf Dint and Eric Ribbon. In 1224 he was summoned by the king to come with him to Bergen. Again in 1224 he was summoned to meet the king at Eidwood. In 1225, he had 400 men under his command and was supposed to meet the king at a place called Eidawood but saw the Ribbalds and chased them to Oslo, but they escaped. The local bishop, who was his foster father and friend, persuaded Arnbjorn to stay to give him counsel despite his wishes to push on to the king. As a result the Ribbalds got away to Tønsberg, where they killed at least fourteen of the king's men including Grim the White. During the conflict with the Ribbalds in 1226, Arnbjorn and his men dragged 13 ships to the king.

Later in 1226 he spent the winter at Valdisholm. In 1227 Haakon again called for him among others to bring him ships. The king sent one of Arnbjorn's followers, Olaf Swim-Strong, to tell the Ribbalds to hold their words and wait for the battle. By 1226 he held the stewardships of Skaun and Heggin. During this time his estates were plundered by lord Knut Haakonsson for his support of King Haakon against the Ribbalds. As a result he sent a letter to King Haakon asking for support because the Ribbalds were rallying support and building an army. By 1235, along with Gregorius Andrewson, he had become "Handbound" to the king and had sworn an oath of loyalty as one of his guardsmen.

He was with the king in 1235 when he sailed out of Bergen with forty large ships. In 1239, when the king was preparing to go to war with the newly elevated Duke Skule Bårdsson, he sent word to Arnbjørn to raise his levies. Already very old, he continued to fight for the king. In 1240 he got into a fight with Skule's men (Wolfskins) in which he captured their ships, but was wounded in the action and became sick; he died in 1240. According to the Hákonar saga Hákonarsonar:

But because he had great toil and was for on in years, and had other calls which fell upon him, then he took sickness, and lay but a short time ere he breathed his last, and that was thought the greatest loss, for all said with one voice that in that time there was thought to be no such man in Norway.

== Bibliography ==
- Rerum Britannicarum Medii Aevi Scriptores: Or, Chronicles and Memorials of Great Britain and Ireland During the Middle Ages. Vol. 88. H.M. Stationery Office. 1894 – via Great Britain Public Record.
