= Skule Bårdsson =

Regent of Norway during the infancy of Haakon IV

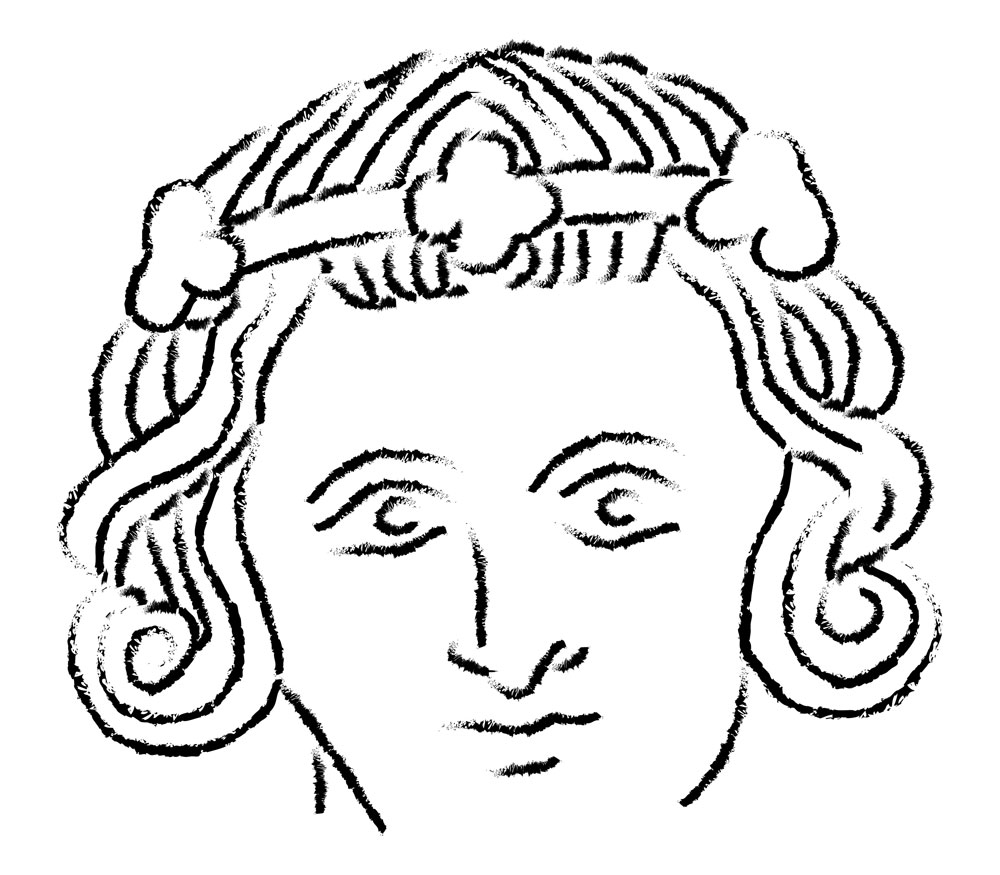
- Reproduction of part of a relief on a grave slab found in the Archbishop's Palace in Trondheim in 1972, which, due to the ducal crown, is believed to have covered the grave of Skule Bårdsson.
- Born: c. 1189
- Died: 24 May 1240 (aged 50–51); Elgeseter Abbey in Nidaros
- Noble family: Godwin
- Spouse: Ragnhild Jonsdotter
- Issue: Margaret, Queen of Norway
- Father: Bård Guttormsson
- Mother: Ragnfrid Erlingsdotter

Skule Bårdsson or Duke Skule (Norwegian: Hertug Skule; Old Norse: Skúli Bárðarson) (c. 1189–24 May 1240) was a Norwegian nobleman and claimant to the royal throne against his son-in-law, King Haakon Haakonsson. Henrik Ibsen's play Kongs-Emnerne (1863) is about the dispute between Duke Skule and King Haakon.

== Biography ==
Skule Bårdsson was born around 1189 to Bård Guttormsson.

Skule held much of the real power under a form of power sharing between Skule and Haakon. Skule's center of power was mostly in Nidaros. He had noblemen who were handbound to him (his vassals/liegemen) such as Endrid Bookling, and Alf of Leifa-steads. These men would probably be somewhere between a European count and a high Ministerialis. In order to facilitate a compromise between these two rivals, Skule's elder daughter Margaret Skulesdatter was married to King Haakon in 1225.

Skule thought he had too little power and intermittently participated in opposition against King Haakon. In 1237, as another attempt at compromise, Skule was given the first Norwegian title of duke (hertug). Later, Skule restarted his rebellion against King Haakon. Among others, the Icelander writer Snorre Sturlason allied with Skule in the conflict, and the rebellion led to his death. Skule got into a personal confrontation with Arnbjorn Jonsson over the Borg Stewardship but eventually Arnbjorn yielded his claim to the stewardship because Abbot Bjorn showed him that the king had indeed granted Skule the stewardship.

Skule allowed his supporters to proclaim him king of Norway at the traditional Thing (Øyrating) in Trøndelag during 1239. Skule also tried, unsuccessfully, to win his other son-in-law, jarl Knut Haakonsson, to his side. He raised a military host against King Haakon and won a battle at Låka in Nannestad, but lost in Oslo. His party was called the Vårbelgs, a reference to spring pelts of bad quality fur for poor people. In May 1240, Skule was defeated by King Haakon and his supporters. He sought refuge in Elgeseter Priory in Nidaros but Haakon's men burned down the monastery and killed Skule. With Skule's death, the civil war era came to an end.

== Historical context ==
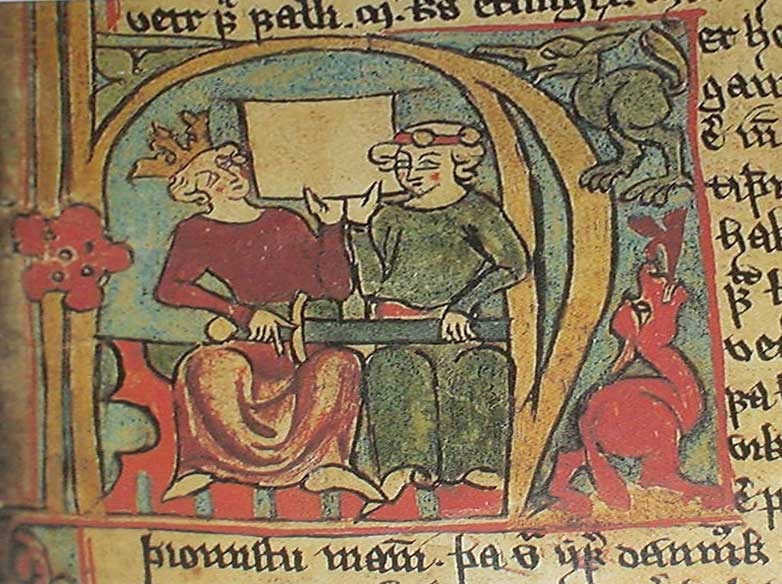
Haakon and Skule Bårdsson, from the 14th century Icelandic Flateyjarbók.

Skule's rivalry for kingship was the last phase of the civil wars period of Norwegian history, which lasted from around 1130 to 1240. During that long warring period there were several interlocked conflicts of varying scale and intensity. Norway was accustomed to royal sons fighting each other in order to win sole kingship. The background for these conflicts was the unclear Norwegian succession laws, social conditions and the struggle between Church and King. There were then two main parties, firstly known by varying names or no names at all, but finally condensed into parties of Bagler and Birkebeiner.

== Other sources ==
- Bjørgo, Narve "Skule Bårdsson" in: Norsk biografisk leksikon
- Finlay, Alison editor and translator Fagrskinna, a Catalogue of the Kings of Norway (Brill Academic. 2004)
- Hammer, K. V. "Skule Baardssön" in: Nordisk familjebok Bd. 25. Stockholm 1817. pp. 1238–1239.
- Gjerset, Knut History of the Norwegian People (The MacMillan Company, Volume I, 1915)
- Helle, Knut Under kirke og kongemakt, 1130-1350 (Aschehougs Norges historie, Oslo: 1995)
- Holmsen, Andreas Norges historie, fra de eldste tider til 1660 (Oslo: 1961)
- Røsoch, Henry Trondheim's History (Trondheim: F. Bruns Bokhandel. 1939)
- Øverland, O. A.; Bull, Edvard "Skule Baardssøn" in: Salmonsens konversationsleksikon Bd. 21. Kopenhagen 1926. S. 680.
