= 1167 =

1167 in various calendars
- Gregorian calendar: 1167; MCLXVII
- Ab urbe condita: 1920
- Armenian calendar: 616; ԹՎ ՈԺԶ
- Assyrian calendar: 5917
- Balinese saka calendar: 1088–1089
- Bengali calendar: 573–574
- Berber calendar: 2117
- English Regnal year: 13 Hen. 2 – 14 Hen. 2
- Buddhist calendar: 1711
- Burmese calendar: 529
- Byzantine calendar: 6675–6676
- Chinese calendar: 丙戌年 (Fire Dog); 3864 or 3657 — to — 丁亥年 (Fire Pig); 3865 or 3658
- Coptic calendar: 883–884
- Discordian calendar: 2333
- Ethiopian calendar: 1159–1160
- Hebrew calendar: 4927–4928
- Hindu calendars
- Vikram Samvat: 1223–1224
- Shaka Samvat: 1088–1089
- Kali Yuga: 4267–4268
- Holocene calendar: 11167
- Igbo calendar: 167–168
- Iranian calendar: 545–546
- Islamic calendar: 562–563
- Japanese calendar: Nin'an 2 (仁安２年)
- Javanese calendar: 1074–1075
- Julian calendar: 1167; MCLXVII
- Korean calendar: 3500
- Minguo calendar: 745 before ROC 民前745年
- Nanakshahi calendar: −301
- Seleucid era: 1478/1479 AG
- Thai solar calendar: 1709–1710
- Tibetan calendar: མེ་ཕོ་ཁྱི་ལོ་ (male Fire-Dog); 1293 or 912 or 140 — to — མེ་མོ་ཕག་ལོ་ (female Fire-Boar); 1294 or 913 or 141

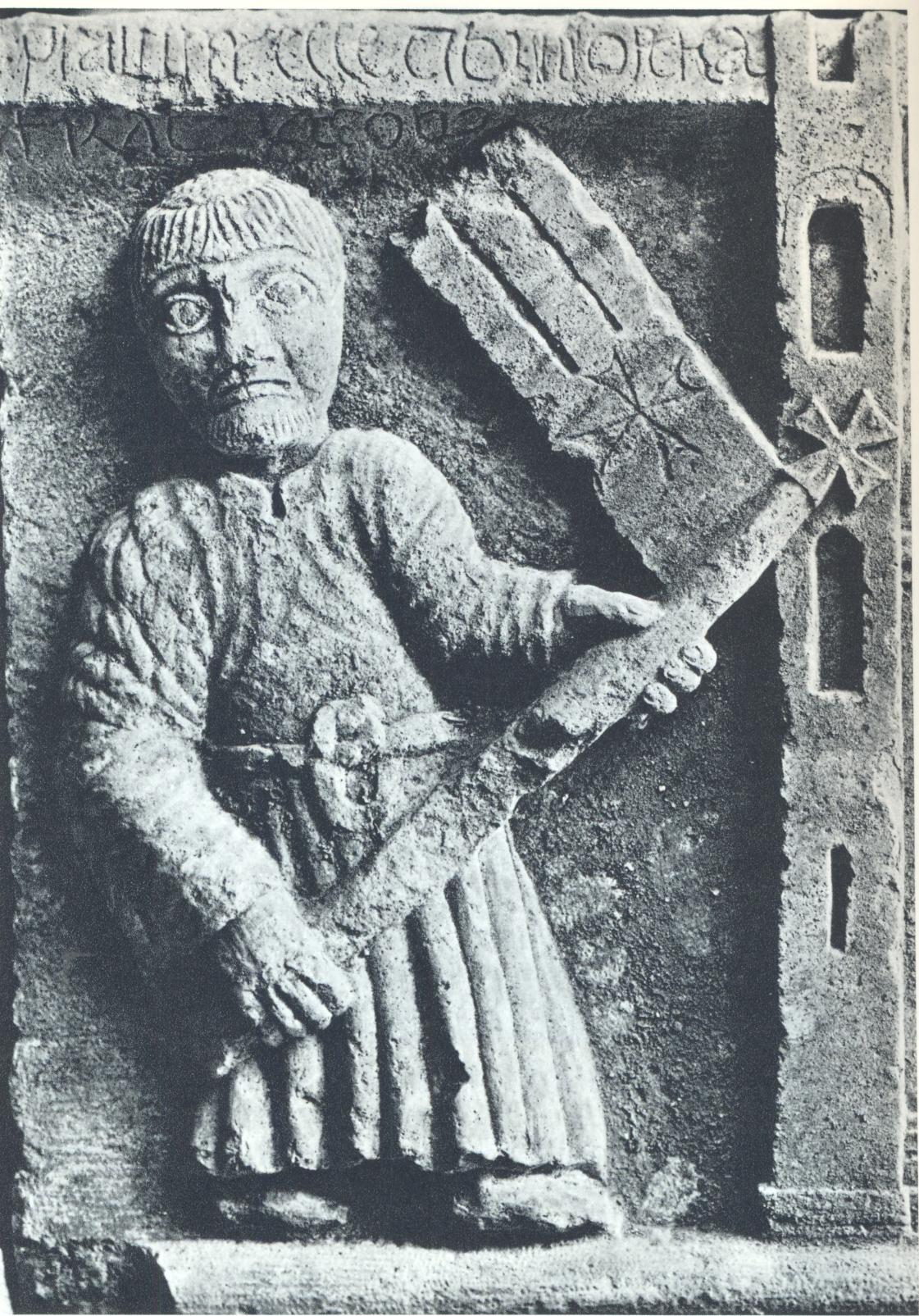
Lombard standard bearer re-entering Milan, after the League's foundation.

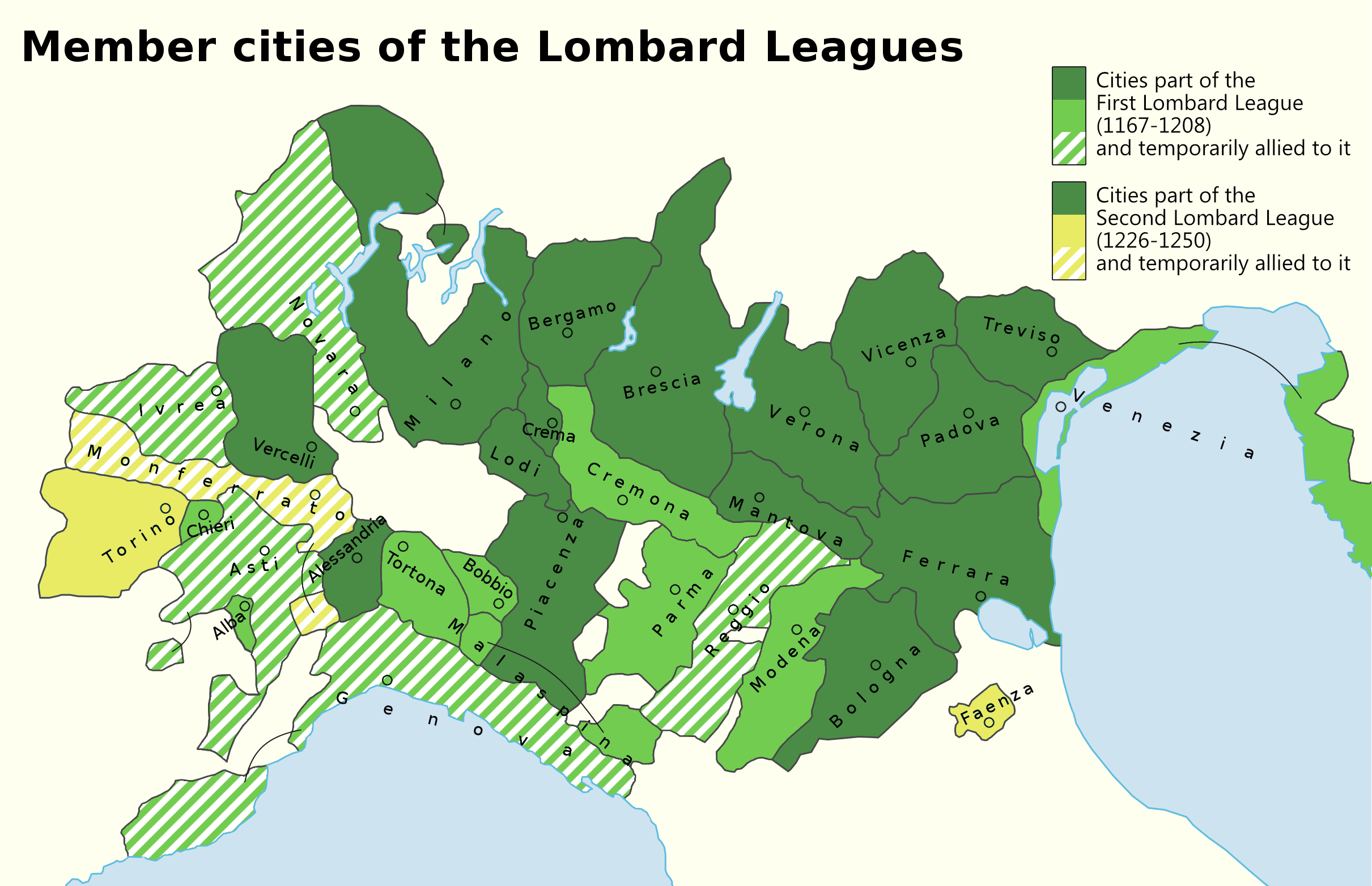
Member cities of the Lombard League

Year 1167 (MCLXVII) was a common year starting on Sunday of the Julian calendar.

== Events ==
=== By place ===
==== Europe ====
- April 7 – Oath of Pontida: Supported by Pope Alexander III, the Lombard League is founded, a military alliance between the municipalities of Milan, Lodi, Ferrara, Piacenza and Parma, against the German invading forces of Emperor Frederick I (Barbarossa) in Northern Italy. The League (with other Italian cities) openly challenges Frederick's claim to power (Honor Imperii).
- April 12 – King Charles VII (Sverkersson) is murdered at Visingsö by supporters of Canute I (son of Eric IX), who proclaims himself king of Sweden. However, Charles's half-brothers Boleslaw and Kol Sverkerson proclaim themselves rulers of Östergötland, in opposition to Canute, which leads to fights for the power in Sweden (until 1173).
- May 29 – Battle of Monte Porzio: The army of the Commune of Rome is defeated by German forces under Frederick I and the local princes; Alexander III leaves Rome. Frederick proceeds to Rome, where he is crowned by Antipope Paschal III for the second time. A sudden outbreak of pestilence kills many of his advisors and knights.
- July 8 – Battle of Sirmium: Byzantine forces (15,000 men) under General Andronikos Kontostephanos defeat the Hungarians at Sirmium. Emperor Manuel I (Komnenos) consolidates his control over the western Balkans.
- August – Frederick I claims imperial authority over Bohemia, Greater Poland and Hungary. He installs his 3-year-old son Frederick V as duke of Swabia, after Frederick's cousin, Frederick IV, dies of disease at Rome.

==== Egypt ====
- March 18 – Battle of al-Babein: A second Zangid army (some 12,000 men) under General Shirkuh and his nephew Saladin marches towards Egypt, but is met by the combined Crusader-Fatimid forces led by King Amalric of Jerusalem. After skirmishing down the Nile, the Crusaders are defeated near Giza and forced to retreat to Cairo.
- May–June – Saladin leads the defence of Alexandria against the Crusader-Fatimid forces. He takes command over the garrison (plus some 1,000 cavalry), and the army's sick and wounded.
- August 4 – Amalric I accepts a peace treaty and enters Alexandria at the head of the Crusader army. Saladin and his troops are escorted out with full military honours, and retreats to Syria.
- Probable date – Battle of Pantina: The Byzantines intervene on behalf of Grand Prince Tihomir of Serbia against his rebellious brother, Prince Stefan Nemanja, who defeats the Byzantine forces and becomes Grand Župan of Serbia.

==== Ireland ====
- Diarmaid mac Murchadha (or Dermot), former king of Leinster, returns to Ireland with an advance party of Flemings under Richard fitz Godbert de Roche.

==== England ====
- King Henry II prohibits English students from attending the University of Paris; many settle at the University of Oxford.

==== Asia ====
- Taira no Kiyomori becomes the first samurai to be appointed Daijo Daijin, chief minister of the government of Japan.

=== By topic ===
==== Religion ====
- Absalon, Danish archbishop and statesman, leads the first synod at Lund. He is granted land around the city of "Havn" (modern-day Copenhagen) and fortifies the coastal defence against the Wends.

== Births ==
- February – Frederick VI, duke of Swabia (d. 1191)
- Anders Sunesen, archbishop of Lund (d. 1228)
- Warin II (the Younger), Norman knight (d. 1218)
- William I, count of Holland (Low Countries) (d. 1222)

== Deaths ==
- January 12 – Aelred of Rievaulx, English abbot (b. 1110)
- February 27 – Robert of Melun, bishop of Hereford (b. 1100)
- April 12 – Charles VII (Sverkersson), king of Sweden (b. 1130)
- July 13 – Xia (Shenfu), Chinese empress consort (b. 1136)
- August
  - Děpold I, Bohemian prince (epidemic)
  - Frederick IV, duke of Swabia (epidemic)
  - Henry I, count of Nassau (epidemic)
  - Henry II, duke of Limburg (epidemic)
- August 14 – Rainald of Dassel, German archbishop (b. 1120)
- August 17 – Nicolò Politi, Italian monk and hermit (b. 1117)
- August 22 – Relindis of Hohenburg, French abbess
- September 10 – Matilda, Holy Roman Empress (b. 1102)
- Abraham ibn Ezra, Spanish philosopher (approximate date)
- Alaungsithu, Burmese king of the Pagan Dynasty (b. 1090)
- Basava, Indian philosopher and statesman (b. 1105)
- Christian I (the Quarrelsome), count of Oldenburg
- Euphrosyne of Polotsk, Kievan princess (b. 1104)
- Hugh of Poitiers, French monk and chronicler
- Occo of Schleswig (or Ogge), Danish bishop
- Raymond I (or Raimond), French nobleman
- Rostislav I, Grand Prince of Kiev (b. 1110)
