= List of Swedish royal consorts =

Spouses of Swedish monarchs

This is a list of Swedish queens consort and other spouses of Swedish monarchs and regents. The role of the royal consort has changed considerably over the centuries. The earliest Swedish consorts are known primarily from legendary accounts, and those before c. 1000, like the monarchs themselves, are often semi-legendary.

Due to the unions of Sweden with Denmark and Norway, many Swedish consorts were also consorts of the monarchs of those countries. Consorts listed for the period 1380–1520 were also consorts of the monarchs of Denmark, while those listed for 1814–1905 were also consorts of the monarchs of Norway.

Sweden has had three female monarchs. One spouse listed below, Frederick of Hesse-Kassel, was male.

== Semi-legendary queens ==
This is a list of Swedish queens of legend.

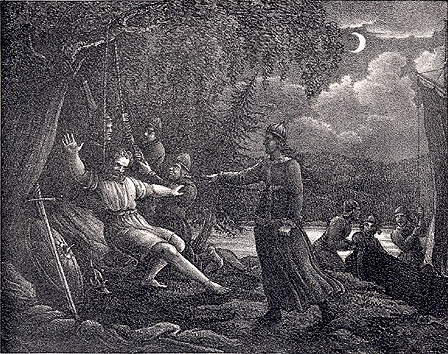
Agne being hanged by his wife Skjalf. Artwork by Hugo Hamilton, 1830.

Yrsa falling in love with Helgi, unaware that he is her father. Artwork by Jenny Nyström, 1895.
- Vana, wife of Sveigðir
- Drifa, wife of Vanlandi
- 3rd century: Drott, wife of Domar
- 4th century: Skjalf (wife of Agne)
- 5th century: Bera (wife of Alf)
- 6th century: Yrsa, wife of Eadgils
- 7th century: Gauthildr Algautsdóttir of Götaland, (wife of Ingjald)
- 7th century: Princess of Småland, daughter of king Heidrek of Småland, (wife of Ivar Vidfamne)
- 8th century: Inghild of Sweden (wife of Randver)
- 970–975: Ingeborg Thrandsdotter (wife of Olof Björnsson)

== House of Uppsala and Stenkil ==
| Picture | Name | Father | Birth | Marriage | Became Consort | Ceased to be Consort | Death | Spouse |
|---|---|---|---|---|---|---|---|---|
| | Sigrid the Haughty and/or Świętosława of Poland | Mieszko I of Poland (Piast) | c. 955 | 978 | | c. 990s divorce | 02 February 1014 | Eric the Victorious |
| | Aud Haakonsdottir of Lade | Ladejarl Haakon Sigurdsson, regent of Norway | c. 970 | c. 990s | | 992 husband's death | c. 1015 | Eric the Victorious |
| | Estrid of the Obotrites | a tribal chief of the Polabian Obotrites | c. 979 | c. 1000 | | c. 1022 husband's death | c. 1035 | Olof Skötkonung |
| | Gunhild Sveinsdotter/Haraldsdotter | Sveinn Hákonarson or Saint Harald | c. 1008 | ? | c. 1022 husband's accession | c. 1050 husband's death | c. 1060 | Anund Jacob |
| | Unknown name, called Ingamoder | Emund the Old of Sweden (Munsö) | c. 1043 | c. 1058 | c. 1061 husband's accession | c. 1066 husband's death | c. 1090 | Stenkil |
| | Gyla | ? | ? | ? | c. 1075 husband's accession | c. 1079 husband's death | ? | Haakon I |
| | Helena | Sigtorn or Ingvar the Far-Travelled | c. 1065 | before 1075 | c. 1079 husband's accession | c. 1084 husband's deposition | 1140 | Inge the Elder |
| | Blotstulka | ? | ? | before 1094 | c. 1084 husband's accession | c. 1087 husband's death | ? | Blot-Sweyn |
| | Helena | Sigtorn or Prince Ingvar Vittfarne of Sweden | ? | ? | c. 1088 husband's accession | c. 1105 husband's death | after 1105 | Inge the Elder |
| | Ingegerd Haraldsdotter of Norway | Harald III of Norway (Hardrada) | c. 1046 | c. 1095 or 1096 | c. 1105/1110 husband's accession | c. 1118 husband's death | c. 1120 | Filip Halstensson |
| Non-contemporary | Ragnhild | Halsten Stenkilsson | c. 1075 | ? | ? | c. 1117 | | Inge the Younger |
| | Ulvhild Håkansdotter | Haakon Finnsson (Thjotta) | c. 1095 | c. 1116/17 | | c. 1125 husband's death | c. 1148 | Inge the Younger |
| | Richeza of Poland | Boleslaw III of Poland (Piast) | c. 12 April 1106/1116 | c. 1127 | | c. 1130 husband's deposition | after 1156 | Magnus Nilsson |

== House of Sverker and of Eric ==
| Picture | Name | Father | Birth | Marriage | Became Consort | Ceased to be Consort | Death | Spouse |
|---|---|---|---|---|---|---|---|---|
| | Ulvhild Håkansdotter | Haakon Finnsson (Thjotta) | c. 1095 | c. 1134 | | c. 1148 | | Sverker I |
| | Richeza of Poland | Boleslaw III of Poland (Piast) | c. 12 April 1116 | c. 1148 | | 25 December 1156 husband's assassination | after 1156 | Sverker I |
| | Christina of Denmark | Björn Haraldsen Ironside (Estridsen) | c. 1120/25 | 1149 or 1150 | c. 1156 husband's accession | 18 May 1160 husband's assassination | c. 1170 | Erik Jedvardsson |
| | Bridget Haraldsdotter | Harald IV of Norway (Hardrada) | c. 1131 | ? | 18 May 1160 husband's accession | c. 1161 husband's assassination | c. 1208 | Magnus Henriksson |
| | Christina Hvide | Stig Tokesen Hvide (Hvide) | c. 1145 | 1163 or 1164 | | 12 April 1167 husband's assassination | c. 1200 | Karl Sverkersson |
| | Cecilia (?) | Prince Johan Sverkersson of Sweden (Sverker) | c. 1145 | 1160 | 12 April 1167 husband's accession | c. 1190 entered a convent | after 1193 | Knut Eriksson |
| | Benedicta Hvide | Ebbe Sunesson Hvide (Hvide) | c. 1165/1170 | c. 1185 | c. 1196 husband's accession | c. 1199/1200 | | Sverker II |
| | Ingegerd Birgersdotter | Birger Brosa (Bjälbo) | c. 1180 | 1200 | | 31 January 1208 husband's deposition | 7 April after 1210, possibly 1230 | Sverker II |
| | Rikissa of Denmark | Valdemar I of Denmark (Estridsen) | c. 1190/1191 | 1210 | | 10 April 1216 husband's death | 8 May 1220 | Erik Knutsson |
| | Helena Pedersdatter Strange | Peder Strangesson | c. 1200 | c. 1225 | c. 1229 husband's accession | c. 1234 husband's death | c. 1255 | Knut Långe |
| | Catherine Sunesdotter | Sune Folkesson (Bjälbo) | c. 1215 | c. 1243/1244 | | 2 February 1250 husband's death | fl. 17 January 1251 | Erik Eriksson |

== House of Bjälbo ==
| Picture | Name | Father | Birth | Marriage | Became Consort | Ceased to be Consort | Death | Spouse |
|---|---|---|---|---|---|---|---|---|
| | Sofia of Denmark | Eric IV of Denmark (Estridsen) | 1241 | 1260 | | 22 July 1275 husband's deposition | 1286 | Valdemar |
| | Helvig of Holstein | Gerhard I, Count of Holstein-Itzehoe (Schauenburg) | c. 1260 | 11 November 1276 | | 18 December 1290 husband's death | fl. 1324 | Magnus Ladulås |
| | Martha of Denmark | Eric V of Denmark (Estridsen) | 1277 | November 1298 | | March or April 1318 husband's deposition | 3 October 1341 | Birger |
| Non-contemporary | Blanche of Namur | John I, Marquis of Namur (Dampierre) | c. 1320 | October or early November 1335 | | 1363 | | Magnus Eriksson |
| | Beatrix of Bavaria | Louis V, Duke of Bavaria (Wittelsbach) | | 17 October 1356 husband's accession as joint-queen with Blanka, her mother-in-law | | 20 June 1359 husband's death | 1359 | Erik Magnusson |
| | Margaret of Denmark | Valdemar IV of Denmark (Estridsen) | Spring 1353 | 9 April 1363 as co-queen consort then claimant | | 15 February 1364 husband's deposition (claimed until 1380) | 28 October 1412 | Haakon Magnusson |

== House of Mecklenburg ==
| Picture | Name | Father | Birth | Marriage | Became Consort | Ceased to be Consort | Death | Spouse |
|---|---|---|---|---|---|---|---|---|
| | Richardis of Schwerin | Otto I, Count of Schwerin (Hagen) | 1347/8 | 1365 | | 23 April/11 July 1377 | | Albert |

== Union queens and consorts of regents, 1397–1523 ==
Several of the queens listed below were also queen consort of Denmark and Norway. During periods when Sweden was governed by a regent rather than a king, the wives of the regents are also listed.

Queen consorts

| Picture | Name | Father | Birth | Marriage | Became consort | Ceased to be consort | Death | Spouse |
|---|---|---|---|---|---|---|---|---|
| Non-contemporary | Philippa of England | Henry IV of England (Lancaster) | 4 June 1394 | 26 October 1406 | | 7 January 1430 | | Erik of Pomerania |
| | Dorothea of Brandenburg | John, Margrave of Brandenburg-Kulmbach (Hohenzollern) | 1430/1431 | 12 September 1445 | | 6 January 1448 husband's death | 10 November 1495 | Christopher of Bavaria |

Consorts of regents

- 1448: Karin Karlsdotter, third wife of Regent Nils Jönsson
- 1448: Merete Lydekedatter Stralendorp of Venngarn, second wife of Regent Bengt Jönsson

Queen consorts

| Picture | Name | Father | Birth | Marriage | Became consort | Ceased to be consort | Death | Spouse |
|---|---|---|---|---|---|---|---|---|
| | Catherine of Bjurum | Karl Ormsson Gumsehuvud (Gumsehufvud) | ? | 5 October 1438 | 20 June 1448 husband's accession | 7 September 1450 | | Karl Knutsson |
| | Dorothea of Brandenburg | John, Margrave of Brandenburg-Kulmbach (Hohenzollern) | 1430/1431 | 28 October 1449 | 23 June 1457 husband's accession | 23 June 1464 husband's deposition | 10 November 1495 | Christian I |

Consorts of regents

- 1466–1467: Elin Gustavsdotter Sture (second time), wife of Regent Erik Axelsson Tott

Queen consorts

| Picture | Name | Father | Birth | Marriage | Became consort | Ceased to be consort | Death | Spouse |
|---|---|---|---|---|---|---|---|---|
| | Christina Abrahamsdotter | Abraham Pedersson, governor of Raseborg | 1432 | 1470 | | 15 May 1470 husband's death | 1492 | Karl Knutsson |

Consorts of regents

- 1470–1497: Ingeborg Tott (first time), wife of Regent Sten Sture the Elder; died 1507

Queen consorts

| Picture | Name | Father | Birth | Marriage | Became consort | Ceased to be consort | Death | Spouse |
|---|---|---|---|---|---|---|---|---|
| | Christina of Saxony | Ernst, Elector of Saxony (Wettin) | 25 December 1461 | 6 September 1478 | 6 October 1497 husband's accession | August 1501 husband lost Sweden | 8 December 1521 | Hans |

Consorts of regents

- 1501–1503: Ingeborg Tott (second time), wife of Regent Sten Sture the Elder; died 1507
- 1504–1512: Mette Dyre, second wife of Regent Svante
- 1512–1520: Christina Gyllenstierna, wife of Regent Sten Sture the Younger; died 1559

Queen consorts

| Picture | Name | Father | Birth | Marriage | Became consort | Ceased to be consort | Death | Spouse |
|---|---|---|---|---|---|---|---|---|
| | Isabella of Austria | Philip the Handsome (Habsburg) | 18 July 1501 | 12 August 1515 | 1 November 1520 husband's accession | 23 August 1521 husband lost Sweden | 19 January 1526 | Christian II |

== House of Vasa ==
| Picture | Name | Father | Birth | Marriage | Became Consort | Ceased to be Consort | Death | Spouse |
|---|---|---|---|---|---|---|---|---|
| | Catherine of Saxe-Lauenburg | Magnus I, Duke of Saxe-Lauenburg (Ascania) | 24 September 1513 | 24 September 1531 | | 23 September 1535 | | Gustav I |
| | Margaret Leijonhufvud | Erik Abrahamsson Leijonhufvud (Leijonhufvud) | 1 January 1516 | 1 October 1536 | | 26 August 1551 | | Gustav I |
| | Catherine Stenbock | Gustaf Olofsson Stenbock (Stenbock) | 22 July 1535 | 22 August 1552 | | 29 September 1560 husband's death | 13 December 1621 | Gustav I |
| | Catherine "Karin" | Måns | 6 October 1550 | 13 July 1567 (unofficially); 4 July 1568 (officially) | | January 1569 husband's deposition | 13 September 1612 | Erik XIV |
| | Catherine Jagiellon | Sigismund I of Poland (Jagellon) | 1 November 1526 | 4 October 1562 | January 1569 husband's accession | 16 September 1583 | | John III |
| | Gunilla Johansdotter Bielke | Johan Axelsson Bielke, governor of Östergötland (Bielke) | 25 June 1568 | 15 February 1585 | | 17 November 1592 husband's death | 19 July 1597 | John III |
| | Anne of Austria | Charles II, Archduke of Austria (Habsburg) | 16 August 1573 | 31 May 1592 | 17 November 1592 husband's accession | 10 February 1598 | | Sigismund III Vasa |
| | Christina of Holstein-Gottorp | Adolf, Duke of Holstein-Gottorp (Holstein-Gottorp) | 13 April 1573 | 8 July 1592 | 22 March 1604 husband's accession | 30 October 1611 husband's death | 8 December 1625 | Charles IX |
| | Maria Eleonora of Brandenburg | John Sigismund, Elector of Brandenburg (Hohenzollern) | 11 November 1599 | 25 November 1620 | | 6 November 1632 husband's death | 28 March 1655 | Gustav II Adolph |

== House of Palatinate-Zweibrücken ==
| Picture | Name | Father | Birth | Marriage | Became Consort | Ceased to be Consort | Death | Spouse |
|---|---|---|---|---|---|---|---|---|
| | Hedwig Eleonora of Holstein-Gottorp | Frederick III, Duke of Holstein-Gottorp (Holstein-Gottorp) | 23 October 1636 | 24 October 1654 | | 13 February 1660 husband's death | 24 November 1715 | Charles X Gustav |
| | Ulrika Eleonora of Denmark | Frederick III of Denmark (Oldenburg) | 11 September 1656 | 6 May 1680 | | 26 July 1693 | | Charles XI |
| | Frederick of Hesse-Kassel | Charles I, Landgrave of Hesse-Kassel (Hesse-Kassel) | 18 April 1676 | 24 March 1715 | 5 December 1718 wife's accession | 29 February 1720 wife's abdication, his own accession | 25 March 1751 | Ulrika Eleonora |

== House of Hesse ==
| Picture | Name | Father | Birth | Marriage | Became Consort | Ceased to be Consort | Death | Spouse |
|---|---|---|---|---|---|---|---|---|
| | Ulrika Eleonora of Sweden | Charles XI (Palatinate-Zweibrücken) | 23 January 1688 | 24 March 1715 | 24 March 1720 husband's accession | 24 November 1741 | | Frederick I |

== House of Holstein-Gottorp ==
| Picture | Name | Father | Birth | Marriage | Became Consort | Ceased to be Consort | Death | Spouse |
|---|---|---|---|---|---|---|---|---|
| | Louisa Ulrika of Prussia | Frederick William I of Prussia (Hohenzollern) | 24 July 1720 | 18 August 1744 | 25 March 1751 husband's accession | 12 February 1771 husband's death | 16 July 1782 | Adolf Frederick |
| | Sophia Magdalena of Denmark | Frederick V of Denmark (Oldenburg) | 3 July 1746 | 4 November 1766 | 12 February 1771 husband's accession | 29 March 1792 husband's death | 21 August 1813 | Gustav III |
| | Frederica of Baden | Charles Louis, Hereditary Prince of Baden (Zähringen) | 12 March 1781 | 31 October 1797 | | 29 March 1809 husband's abdication | 25 September 1826 | Gustav IV Adolf |
| | Hedwig Elizabeth Charlotte of Holstein-Gottorp | Frederick August I, Duke of Oldenburg (Holstein-Gottorp) | 22 March 1759 | 7 July 1774 | 6 June 1809 husband's accession | 5 February 1818 husband's death | 20 June 1818 | Charles XIII |

== House of Bernadotte ==
| Picture | Coat of Arms | Name | Father | Birth | Marriage | Became Consort | Ceased to be Consort | Death | Spouse |
|---|---|---|---|---|---|---|---|---|---|
| | | Desideria | François Clary (Clary family) | 8 November 1777 | 17 August 1798 | 5 February 1818 husband's accession | 8 March 1844 husband's death | 17 December 1860 | Charles XIV John |
| | | Josephine of Leuchtenberg | Eugène de Beauharnais (Beauharnais) | 14 March 1807 | 19 June 1823 | 8 March 1844 husband's accession | 8 July 1859 husband's death | 7 June 1876 | Oscar I |
| | | Louise of the Netherlands | Prince Frederick of the Netherlands (Orange-Nassau) | 5 August 1828 | 19 June 1850 | 8 July 1859 husband's accession | 30 March 1871 | | Charles XV |
| | | Sophia of Nassau | Wilhelm, Duke of Nassau (Nassau-Weilburg) | 9 July 1836 | 6 June 1857 | 18 September 1872 husband's accession | 8 December 1907 husband's death | 30 December 1913 | Oscar II |
| | | Victoria of Baden | Friedrich I, Grand Duke of Baden (Zähringen) | 7 August 1862 | 20 September 1881 | 8 December 1907 husband's accession | 4 April 1930 | | Gustaf V |
| | | Louise of Battenberg | Prince Louis of Battenberg (Battenberg) | 13 July 1889 | 3 November 1923 | 29 October 1950 husband's accession | 7 March 1965 | | Gustaf VI Adolf |
| | | Silvia | Walther Sommerlath | 23 December 1943 | 19 June 1976 | | Incumbent | – | Carl XVI Gustaf |

== Regents ==
Some Swedish consorts acted as regents for their husbands or children, and had seats in the governments. These were:

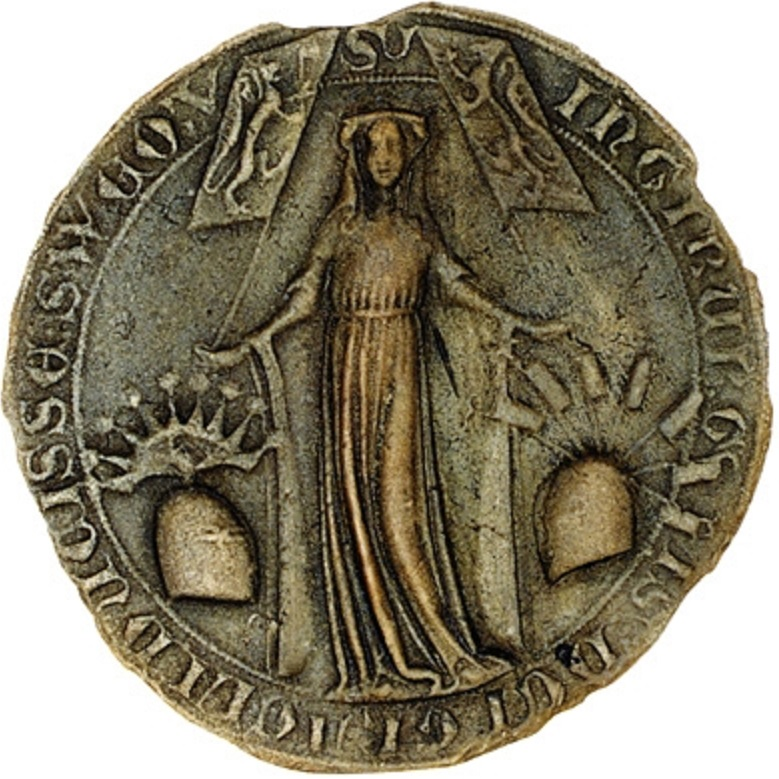
Duchess Ingeborg

- 1318–1326: Duchess Ingeborg, widow of Prince Eric, served as regent during the minority of her son.
- 1424–1430: Philippa of England, served as her husband's representative in Sweden during his absence.
- 1470–1497: Ingeborg Tott, intermittently served during her husband's absence.
- 1504–1512: Mette Dyre, intermittently held a seat in the government during her husband's absence.
- 1520: Christina Gyllenstierna, served as regent and commander of Stockholm during the minority of her son.
- 1605: Christina of Holstein-Gottorp, served during the absence of her husband.
- 1611: Christina of Holstein-Gottorp, served as interim regent during the minority of her son.
- 1660–1672: Hedwig Eleonora of Holstein-Gottorp, served as regent during the minority of her son.
- 1697: Hedwig Eleonora of Holstein-Gottorp, served as regent during the minority of her grandson.
- 1700–1713: Hedwig Eleonora of Holstein-Gottorp, served during the absence of her grandson.
- 1731 and 1738: Ulrika Eleonora of Sweden, served during the absence of her husband.

== Queens regnant ==
The following women reigned as queens regnant of Sweden:

- 1389–1412: Margaret I of Denmark
- 1632–1654: Christina of Sweden
- 1718–1720: Ulrika Eleonora of Sweden (queen consort, 1720–1741)

== See also ==
- List of Swedish monarchs
- List of Finnish consorts (c. 13th century–1809)
- List of Danish consorts (1397–1520)
- List of Norwegian consorts (1814–1905)
