= Kol (bishop of Linköping) =

12th-century Swedish bishop

Kol (Latin: Colo) was the bishop of Linköping in Sweden from 1160 or 1171 until his death in 1195 or 1196.

Kol may have belonged to the House of Sverker. His predecessor, Stenar, resigned his see to become a monk. Kol was elected by the clergy and the people with the support of the king, but, since Stenar had not received papal permission to resign, the validity his election was questionable. According to a letter to Pope Alexander III, Archbishop Eskil of Lund participated in the consecration of Kol as bishop because Linköping's actual superior, Archbishop Stefan of Uppsala, was abroad. The pope nevertheless confirmed the election.

Kol probably came to power during the civil war between the rival kings Kol and Burislev (1167–1173). Early in his episcopate, probably between 1171 and 1173, Kol built the first round church in Sweden at Vårdsberg. He also built the church with an eastern tower at Källstad. According to a letter from 1208, the bridge at Kulsbro bore Kol's name because he had paid for it.

Kol was the first Swedish bishop to visit the Holy Land. He died in Jerusalem. According to the Cronica Episcoporum Lincopensium, "finally, he took up the pilgrim's staff, / and died by the Holy Tomb, / in the year 1196 / after Jesus, the Son of God, was born." Ericus Olai, however, places his death in 1195. He also refers to him as Duke of Finland (dux Finlandiae), an anachronistic title implying ecclesiastical authority over Finland. An unreliable interpolation in a 16th-century document refers to Kol as the chancellor of King Canute I.

== Bibliography ==
- Adams, Jonathan (2023). Jews in East Norse Literature: A Study of Othering in Medieval Denmark and Sweden. De Gruyter. doi:10.1515/9783110775747. ISBN 978-3-11-077574-7.
- Blomkvist, Nils (2005). The Discovery of the Baltic: The Reception of a Catholic World-System in the European North (AD 1075–1225). Brill.
- Gahrn, Lars [in Swedish] (2006). Biskop Kol och slaget vid Herrevadsbro: i källor, sägner och historieskrivning (PDF). Kolbäcks hembygdsförening.
- Gams, Pius Bonifacius (1957) [1873]. Series episcoporum Ecclesiae catholicae. Akademische Druck- und Verlagsanstalt.
- Kondor, Márta (2007). "Uppsala and Spalato: Parallels and Differences Between Two Archbishoprics on the Rims of Western Christendom in the Time of Pope Alexander III (1159–1181)". Specimina Nova Pars Prima Sectio Medaevalis. 4: 15–34. doi:10.15170/SPMNNV.2007.04.02.
- Lamm, Carl Johan [in Swedish] (1941). Oriental Glass of Mediaeval Date Found in Sweden and the Early History of Lustre Painting. Kungl. Vitterhets Historie och Antikvitets Akademiens Handlingar.
- Line, Philip (2007). Kingship and State Formation in Sweden, 1130–1290. Brill.
- Markus, Kersti (2020). Visual Culture and Politics in the Baltic Sea Region, 1100–1250. Brill.
- Wicker, Nancy L. (2012). "Nimble-fingered Maidens in Scandinavia: Women as Artists and Patrons". In Therese Martin (ed.). Reassessing the Roles of Women as 'Makers' of Medieval Art and Architecture. Brill. pp. 863–902.
