= Cecilia Johansdotter =

Queen of Sweden from 1167 to 1190

Queen consort of Sweden
- Tenure: 1167–1190
- Spouse: Knut Eriksson

Cecilia Johansdotter (fl. 1193) is the possible name of the wife of King Knut Eriksson of Sweden and mother of King Erik Knutsson. Little is known about her except that she was of aristocratic origins and died sometime after 1193.

== Biography ==
Despite the fact that she was queen for over twenty years, the queen consort of Knut Eriksson is one of the most unknown of Swedish queens. Neither her name, her parents or her birth and death years are confirmed. Knut stated in a letter to Pope Clement III that his bride was the only one who was of sufficiently high status to marry him, which may point to royal connections. Some historians guess that she was the daughter of Johan, son of King Sverker I of Sweden (died 1156). The assumption that she carried the name Cecilia rests on the hypothesis that an annal entry from the 14th century has been twisted. This text states that the mother of King Erik the Saint (died 1160) was called Cecilia, the sister of Ulf Jarl and Kol and the daughter of a king Sven (presumably alluding to Blot-Sven). This in turn can be compared with a genealogy that mentions Ubbe (Ulf), Kol and Burislev as the sons of Johan Sverkersson. Their implied sister Cecilia would then have been the mother of King Erik, son of Knut Eriksson, rather than being the mother of Erik the Saint. The hypotheses might be strengthened by a 13th-century painting in the church of Dädesjö mentioning the names Knut and (possibly) Cecilia.

However, a marriage alliance between the two feuding royal clans of Sverker and Erik is not entirely plausible. A contemporary document shows that she was the sister of another nobleman called Knut, known in an (alleged) lost document as Knut Ulvhildsson. According to an alternative hypothesis, the Queen's brother Knut was the son of an Ingeborg, daughter of Sigvard. These three persons were all donators to Vårfruberga Abbey. Some early-modern writers allege that the queen was a sister of Jarl Birger Brosa which is considered highly unlikely. As a girl (juuencula), the lady was to have been married to Prince Knut Eriksson about the year 1160, but the murder of Erik the Saint forced her to enter a convent while Knut escaped. In 1167, seven years later, her husband became King and she was made Queen of Sweden.

There is only one story that truly mentions the Queen in more detail. In around 1190, the Queen was taken ill. It was a grave illness, and people worried that she would die. To avoid death, the Queen promised on her sick bed, that if God would spare her life, she would enter a convent after her recovery to show her gratitude. Eventually, she recovered from her sickness, but did not wish to become a nun, nor did her husband wish it. They sent an appeal to the Pope in Rome to ask if she could be released from her promise and continue her marital obligations. Knut argued that he must secure the support of her relatives in order to fight the pagans east of the Baltic Sea, and therefore maintain married life. Pope Celestine III wrote back to the Swedish bishops and asked that the circumstances should be further verified. The outcome is not known. This letter is dated to 1193. The year of her death is unknown.

== Marriage and children ==
The couple was betrothed before the death of King Erik the Saint in 1160. After Erik's death, Karl Sverkersson from the rival House of Sverker succeeded him, forcing Knut into exile, while his betrothed was placed in a convent for her safety. Their marriage took place after Knut ascended the throne in 1167, but it was temporarily dissolved when she was again compelled to enter a convent in the 1190s due to an illness (see above).

The couple had four sons, one of whom was appointed Knut's successor with the approval of the nobles. However, after Knut's death in 1195, Sverker Karlsson succeeded him instead. In 1205, their sons rebelled against King Sverker, but three of them were killed in the Battle of Älgarås that November. The surviving son, Erik Knutsson, fled to Norway. He later returned, defeated Sverker Karlsson, and became King of Sweden in 1208.

It has been asserted that the king and queen had a daughter, possibly named Sigrid or Karin, who is said to have either married Jarl Knut Birgersson and become the mother of Magnus Broka, or married Magnus Broka himself, with whom she had a son, Knut, a claimant to the Swedish throne who was killed in 1251. The existence of this daughter is based on ambiguous references in old sagas and chronicles, particularly the Norwegian Hákonar saga Hákonarsonar. While her existence is not firmly established, it is somewhat accepted in scholarly literature as an explanation for Knut Magnusson's hereditary claim to the throne. This daughter would have been born in the 1170s or 1180s. She is also proposed by old romanticized genealogies as mother of a duke's daughter Cecilia Knutsdotter (by necessity born near 1208 at earliest), whose parentage however is fully shrouded in mists of history.

== Literature ==
- Ahnlund, Nils, "Vreta klosters äldsta donatorer", Historisk tidskrift 65, 1945.
- Gillingstam, Hans (1975–1977). "Knut Eriksson". Svenskt Biografiskt Lexikon. Archived from the original on 2017-02-24.
- Lars O. Lagerqvist (1982). "Sverige och dess regenter under 1.000 år" ("Sweden and its rulers during 1000 years") (in Swedish). Albert Bonniers Förlag AB. ISBN 91-0-075007-7.
- Kjellberg, Carl M., "Erik den heliges ättlingar", Historisk tidskrift 8, 1888.
- Åke Ohlmarks, Alla Sveriges drottningar (All the queens of Sweden) (Swedish)
- Schück, Adolf, "Från Viby till Bjälbo. Studier i Sveriges historia under 1100-talets andra hälft", Fornvännen 1951.

Cecilia Johansdotter Died: after 1193
Swedish royalty
Preceded by Christine Stigsdotter	Queen consort of Sweden; 1167–1190	Succeeded by Benedicta Hvide
