= Erik Årsäll =

Semi-historical king of Sweden

Erik Årsäll (Old Norse: Eiríkr hinn ársæli) was a semi-historical king of Sweden. His historicity has been called into question. He is dated by some to the end of the 11th century, by others to the 1120s, while more critical historians believe that he is a legendary name belonging to the 10th century. According to some, he was the son of the pagan Swedish king Blót-Sweyn, and, like his father before him, administered the blóts at the temple at Uppsala. However, Erik does not appear in any Swedish or Danish primary sources.

His epithet indicates that the harvests during his reign were good.

== Snorre Sturluson's account ==
The 13th-century historian Snorri Sturluson wrote in the Heimskringla that Blót-Sweyn and Erik had renounced Christianity and still ruled a largely pagan Sweden:

At that time there were many people all around in the Swedish dominions who were heathens, and many were bad Christians; for there were some of the kings who renounced Christianity, and continued heathen sacrifices, as Blotsvein, and afterwards Eirik Arsale, had done.

If Erik succeeded Blót-Sweyn he would have been the contemporary of Inge the Elder, and this suggests that Erik could have been the last high priest (goði) of the Temple at Uppsala, and that he was killed or deposed by Inge the Elder. There is nothing in the sources that directly substantiates this, however. The 15th-century Prosaic Chronicle says that he was briefly attracted by the Christian religion but soon rejected it out of fear for a pagan reaction; he was nevertheless slain at Uppsala by his own men. This source is however problematic since it is late and mixes different events and epochs.

== Medieval genealogies ==
Erik is mentioned in unverifiable sources of legend, especially the Icelandic genealogy Langfeðgatal, which speaks of Kol, son of Blot-Sweyn "whom the Swedes call Erik Årsäll". In this genealogy he stands as the father of Sverker the Elder. The Westrogothic law gives the name of Sverker's father as Cornube. This may be compared with a Swedish annal entry from the 14th century which mentions King Sweyn as the father of Ulf Jarl Galla, Kol, and Cecilia, the mother of Eric the Saint (d. 1160). That would suggest that either Kol or Cornube ("Grain-Ulf") might have been his true name. Erik Årsäll would then be a description of him as a "king during whose reign there were good harvests". One of Sverker's sons or grandsons was actually named Kol. The same legends recount that Kaga Church near Linköping was the ancestral church of Sverker's father, and that the graveyard there was initiated for the earlier burial of Kol.

== Problems of historical identification ==
However, there are several difficulties in identifying Erik Årsäll with Sverker's father. A medieval genealogy of the House of Sverker, found by the historian Nils Ahnlund, mentions the first generation as Kettil Känia (Kettil the non-Christian) who entered his grave-mound while still alive, out of rejection of Christianity. His son was the pagan chief Kol who was baptized right before his death at ripe age. His son in turn was the Christian Kornike (Cornube) who supported the construction of the church of Kaga and sired Sverker the Elder. This does not fit with available data about Erik Årsäll. Moreover, the Swedish annal entry about King Sweyn's children seems to actually allude to the much later Swedish pretender Kol (c. 1170) and his brother Ubbe (Ulf). Finally, some sources identify Erik Årsäll with the historical King Erik Segersäll (d. c. 995), or insert him between this king and his son Olof Skötkonung (d. c. 1022). The identity of Erik Årsäll can therefore not be established with any confidence.

== See also ==
- Kol of Sweden
