= Johan (son of Sverker I) =

Son of King Sverker the Elder

Johan Sverkersson (in Old Icelandic sources called Jón jarl Sørkvisson), who died between 1150 and 1153, was the eldest son of King Sverker the Elder of Sweden and his queen Ulfhild Håkansdotter. He had a role in the outbreak of a war between Sweden and Denmark in the 1150s.

== Background and family ==
Johan was born in the early 1130s as the son of the recently elevated King Sverker and Queen Ulfhild, the former wife of King Niels of Denmark. Most probably he was the eldest son of the king, his junior siblings being Karl Sverkersson, Helena Sverkersdotter and Ingeborg Sverkersdotter. According to the Danish chronicler Saxo Grammaticus, he was "a very valiant but not very courteous man". Preserved lists of donations to the Catholic Church indicate that he married a lady called Ragnhild, probably a relative of Guttorm who was jarl under the reign of Karl Sverkersson (1161-1167). According to a medieval genealogy Johan must have been the father of the two subsequent contenders for the Swedish throne, Kol and Burislev, and another man named Ubbe the Strong. This has been accepted by some historians, such as Adolf Schück, and Lars O. Lagerqvist and Nils Åberg. Some conclude from circumstantial evidence that Johan also had a son called Knut, born around 1152 and mentioned as late as the 1190s, and a daughter Cecilia, speculated to have been the consort to King Knut Eriksson. According to a seventeenth-century source, Johan might have had another son, called Alf, who died young and, like Burislev, was interred in Vreta Abbey. Johan is known in Icelandic sources as Jón jarl, and in Swedish genealogies as Johannes dux. Saxo mentions him without a title.

== Catalyst of conflict and death ==
Johan's mother Ulfhild died before 1150 and Sverker remarried with Richeza of Poland. According to Saxo Grammaticus, the Danish pretender Canute V, Richeza's son in a previous marriage, fled to the court of Sverker in 1150. Sverker received his stepson friendly at first, but Canute was soon forced to sell land that he owned in Sweden in order to maintain himself. Saxo alleges that Johan wrote a lampoon of Canute, where he teased him for being hapless in warfare and a coward. Canute took offence, bought some ships and provisions, and sailed over to Poland and later Germany before re-entering Denmark. (Later on, after Johan's demise, Canute became Sverker's son-in-law by marrying his daughter Helena.)

Not long afterwards, the Danish governor of Halland, Karl, was absent from his jurisdiction. According to Saxo, Prince Johan desired Karl's wife and her sister, who was a widow. He therefore took the opportunity to abduct them and brought them to Sweden where they were sexually abused. Johan forced them to have sex with him in turns, every second night, "and thus violated these chaste women by employing the vilest excesses with them". This behaviour enraged Sverker and the population, and Johan was eventually forced to return the two sisters to Denmark. However, the damage had been done and the Danish King Sweyn III used the incident as a justification for his preparation to invade Sverker's realm. While this served as a pretext, the hostility of Sweyn was mainly due to Sverker's support of his rival Canute V.

Some time later, in about 1152 or 1153, Prince Johan appeared at a Thing where he was killed by an enraged peasantry. He cannot have been much more than 20 years of age when he met his violent end. The incident might have been caused by his recent transgressions. As a result of the killing, a conflict arose between Sverker and his people. Sweyn III took advantage of the turmoil and intervened in the southern province Småland in 1153–54. The war was not a success, however.

== Legacy ==
According to Snorri Sturluson's Skáldatal, Johan was one of the patrons of the Icelandic skald Halldórr skvaldri. His full brother Karl Sverkersson became king in 1161. After Karl's violent death in 1167 at the hand of Knut Eriksson, Johan's young sons Kol and Burislev headed the party of the House of Sverker for a while but were also slain by Knut by 1172/73. Their brother Ubbe the Strong might be the same person as Ulf Jarl who flourished in the 1160s.
