= Richeza of Poland, Queen of Sweden =

Queen of Sweden (1129–1130, 1148–1156)

Richeza of Poland
- Born: c. 1116
- Died: Aft. 25 December 1156
- Burial: Alvastra Abbey
- Spouse: Magnus the Strong; Volodar Glebovich; Sverker I of Sweden
- Issue: Canute V of Denmark; Niels; Vladimir; Vasilko; Sophia of Minsk; Bulizlaus (or Burislev)
- House: Piast
- Father: Bolesław III Wrymouth, Duke of Poland
- Mother: Salomea of Berg

Richeza of Poland (Polish: Ryksa Bolesławówna, Swedish: Rikissa; c. 1116 – after 25 December 1156), a member of the House of Piast, was twice Queen of Sweden and once Princess of Minsk through her three marriages. Tradition describes her as unusually beautiful.

== Early life ==
Richeza was the daughter of Bolesław III Wrymouth, Duke of Poland, by his second wife, Salomea of Berg. The year of her birth is unknown, but is often assumed to be 1116.

== First marriage ==
Bolesław III entered in an alliance with King Niels of Denmark against Wartislaw I, Duke of Pomerania (now in northwestern Poland and northeastern Germany). In order to seal this alliance, a marriage was arranged between Bolesław III's daughter Richeza with Niels' eldest son Magnus the Strong. The wedding took place in Ribe around 1127. Richeza bore her husband two sons: Knud in 1129 and Niels in 1130.

As one of the heirs of his maternal grandfather King Inge I, Magnus claimed Sweden. He was recognized King of Götaland or parts thereof by the Geats (Götar) in c. 1129 after the death of his mother's cousin King Inge II. Then Richeza became Queen consort of Sweden. However, Magnus' rule was not accepted by the Svear, another tribe to the north of the Geats, who vetoed him and elected Ragnvald Knaphövde as the new King. According to the chronicler Saxo Grammaticus, Ragnvald was murdered by supporters of Magnus, who then won the realm ("imperium") as King of Sweden. However, there soon appeared another contender for the throne, Sverker I, who had his power base in Östergötland.

Richeza and her husband had their base in Denmark rather than Sweden. Alarmed by the popularity and Imperial support of his cousin Knud Lavard, Duke of Schleswig, both Magnus and his father King Niels acted against Knud, who was murdered by Magnus on 7 January 1131. Knud's half-brother Erik rebelled against Niels and Magnus, but was defeated and took refuge in Norway, where he convinced the local nobility and the Holy Roman Emperor Lothair III to launch a retaliatory expedition against Niels. Meanwhile, Sverker I finally made the Swedes abandon Magnus in c. 1132, when he was busy with the civil war in Denmark; he then unified the country under his rule. Niels was defeated in the Battle of Fotevik (4 June 1134), and also lost his son Magnus who was slain during the battle. Niels escaped to Schleswig, where he was killed by the citizens (25 June 1134). Now a widow, Richeza returned to Poland, apparently leaving her two sons behind in Denmark.

== Second marriage ==
Once in Poland, Duke Bolesław III arranged a new marriage for his daughter. Richeza remarried in 1134 or 1135, but the identity of her second husband is debated. Most commonly, he is assumed to be Prince Vsevolod Mstislavich of Novgorod.

Alternatively, he is identified as Volodar Glebovich, a member of the Rurikid dynasty, and a Prince of Minsk and Grodno, who at that time was in exile in the Polish court. The union would have been made in order to seal the alliance of Minsk and Poland against Denmark and the powerful Monomakh Kievan dynasty. During this marriage, Richeza gave birth to three children: two sons, Vladimir (later Prince of Minsk) and Vasilko (Prince of Logoysk or Lahojsk), and a daughter, Sophia, born ca. 1139/40.

Around 1145, the political advantages of the Polish-Minsk union began to disappear after the Monomach dynasty lost its hegemony among the Rurikid ruling branches. Likely this was the cause of the dissolution of the marriage of Richeza and Volodar. Richeza returned again to Poland, this time with her daughter Sophia, but left her two sons behind with her former husband. Volodar never remarried and died around 1186. She moved to Denmark when her son Knud or Canute V was enthroned in 1146.

== Third marriage ==
In c. 1148, Queen Ulvhild Håkansdotter, Sverker I's wife and Richeza's old stepmother-in-law, died. Soon afterwards, the widowed King married Richeza, who arrived in Sweden with her daughter Sophia. The King likely married her with support from Richeza's first husband's allies in Götaland. The union produced one son, Bulizlaus or Burislev, who was named after his Polish maternal grandfather. The chronicles assign Sune Sik as the youngest son of Sverker I, possibly born by Richeza.

In 1150, Richeza's oldest son Knud V, King of Jutland, took refuge in Sweden after he was expelled from Denmark by Sweyn III Grathe, King of Zealand. In this way, the marriage with Sverker I give Richeza the opportunity to help her son, and some historians assume that she partially married the Swedish King for this reason. One year later (1151), Knud asked for the help of Henry the Lion, Duke of Saxony and Hartwig I, Archbishop of Bremen, but was defeated by Sweyn III's forces. Only after the mediation of the King of the Germans Frederick Barbarossa during the Imperial Diet in Merseburg was there made a settlement between both parties: Knud V renounced his claim and was compensated by lands in Zealand, while Sweyn III was made king of Denmark. After this decision, both Knud V and Valdemar Knudsson (son of Knud Lavard, the enemy of his own father Magnus) rebelled against Sweyn III, who was expelled in 1154: Knud V and Valdemar became co-rulers of Denmark.

In 1156 Knud V married Helena, daughter of King Sverker I and his first wife Ulvhild; in consequence, Richeza became the step-mother-in-law of her own son. On Christmas Day of that year, Sverker I was murdered by a servant. When Knud V heard about the deed, he went to Sweden in order to console Richeza, but also to bring his half-sister Sophia of Minsk to Denmark to be married to Valdemar, to whom she had been betrothed since 1154. The marriage took place in 1157. On 9 August of that year, King Knud V was killed during a meeting with Valdemar I and Sweyn III. In 1158 Richeza's second son Niels, probably a monk in Esrom Abbey, also died.

== Death and aftermath ==
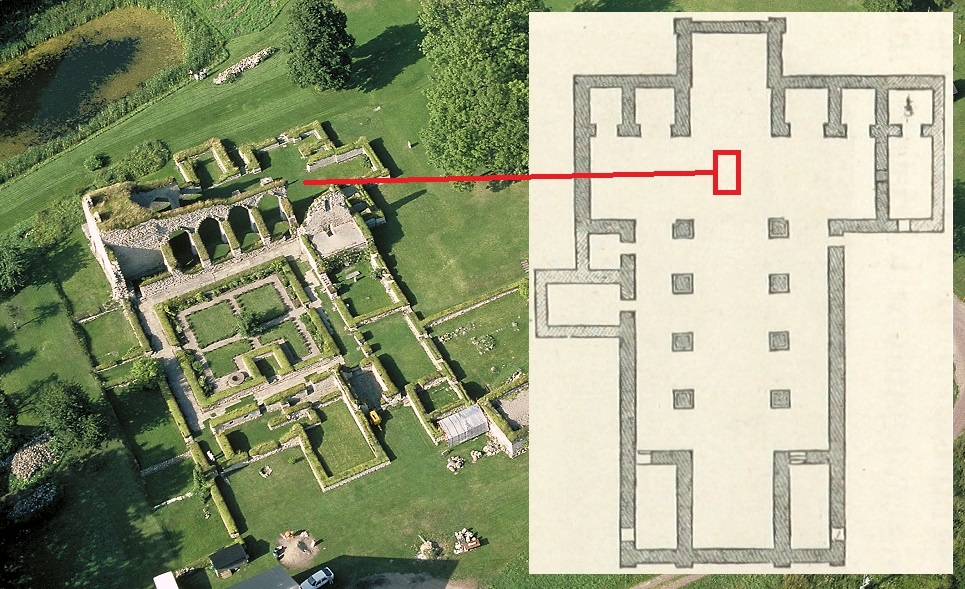
Composite showing the location of Sverker's family grave at Alvastra Abbey

Richeza is known to have survived Sverker I's death, although the facts of her later life and her date of death are unknown: a legend says that she remarried the stable master who took part in the assassination of Sverker I.

Burislev, Richeza's son by Sverker I, is sometimes identified with Burislev, a rival claimant to the Swedish throne against Knut Eriksson after 1167. He acted in concert with another pretender Kol, but was defeated and eliminated, according to a much later source in 1169. He is believed either to have been slain by Knut's men or to have fled to Denmark or Poland some time before 1173. However, medieval Swedish genealogies say that the claimants Kol and Burislev were in fact sons of Johan, a son of Sverker and Ulvhild. If so, the younger Burislev was given the prestigious name after his grandfather's second marriage without actually being related to Bolesław III. The only thing we know about Richeza's son Burislev is that his goods were inherited by his uterine sister Sophia of Minsk.

Richeza's daughter Sophia of Minsk, Queen of Denmark by her first marriage to Valdemar I, give Richeza her only known legitimate grandchildren: the later kings Knud VI and Valdemar II of Denmark; Sophie (Countess of Orlamünde); Margareta and Maria, nuns at Roskilde; Ingeborg (the later repudiated Queen of France); Helena (Duchess of Brunswick-Luneburg) and Rikissa, named after her grandmother and who, like her, became Queen of Sweden.

== Bibliography ==
- Lars O. Lagerqvist (1982). "Sverige och dess regenter under 1.000 år",("Sweden and its rulers during 1000 years") (in Swedish). Albert Bonniers Förlag AB. ISBN 91-0-075007-7.

Richeza of Poland House of Piast Born: 12 April 1116 Died: after 1156
Swedish royalty
Preceded by Ulvhild Håkansdotter	Queen consort of Sweden; 1129–1130	Succeeded by Ulvhild Håkansdotter
Preceded by Ulvhild Håkansdotter	Queen consort of Sweden; 1148–1156	Succeeded by Christina Björnsdotter
