= Battle of Älgarås =

Swedish battle in 1205

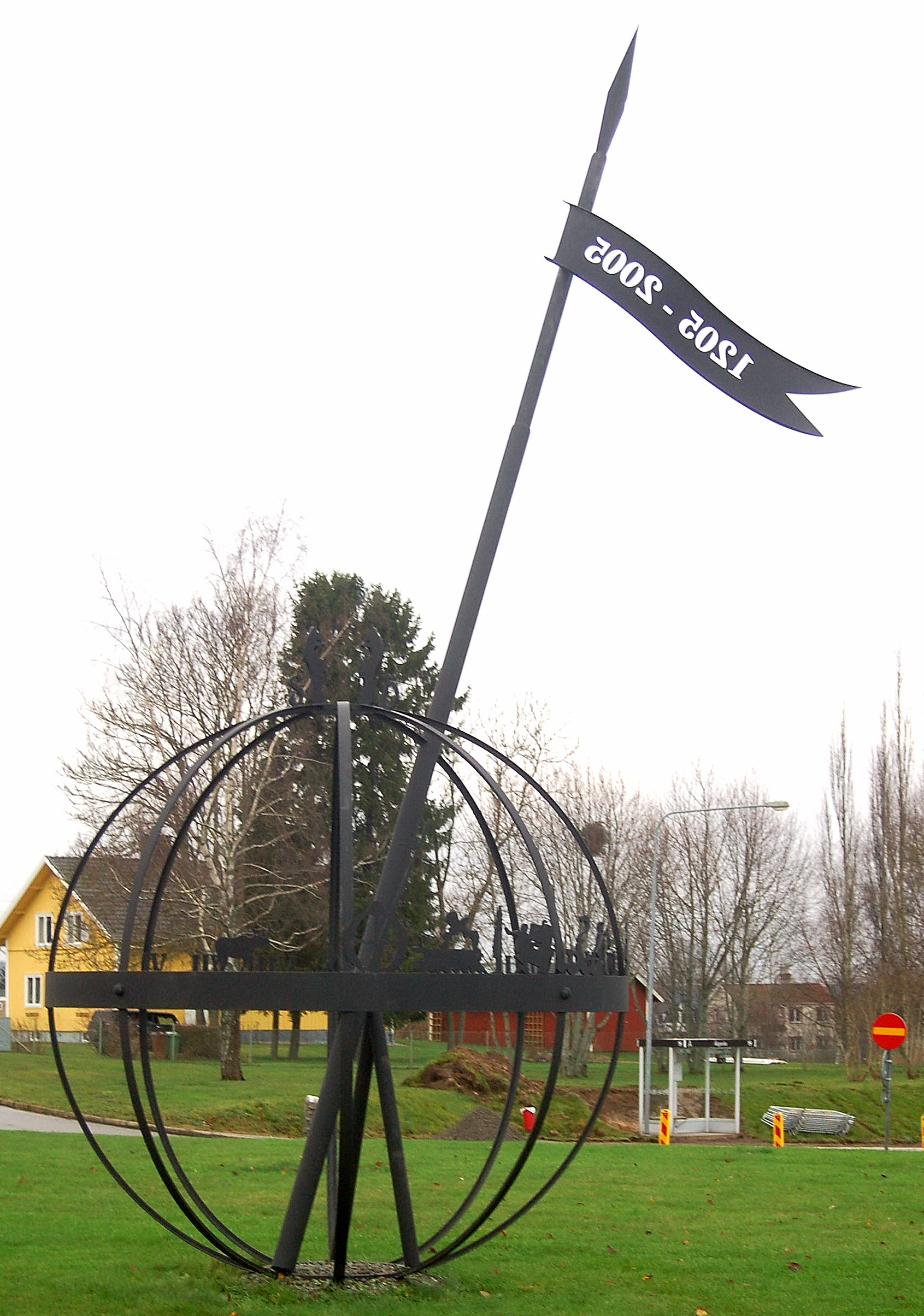
Date	November 1205
Location	Älgarås, Västergötland, Sweden 58°49′N 14°16′E
Result	Victory for House of Sverker

Belligerents
House of Sverker	House of Eric

Commanders and leaders
Sverker II of Sweden	Eric X of Sweden

The Battle of Älgarås took place at the royal estate of Älgarås in northernmost Västergötland in November 1205 between the House of Sverker and the House of Eric who were fighting for the Swedish crown. The four sons of the former king Canute I fell out with King Sverker II in about 1204 and sought support among the Birkebeiner party in Norway. The Birkebeiner leader Jarl Håkon Galen married their cousin in January 1205 and promoted their claim. The brothers, of whom only Eric Knutsson is known by name, returned to Sweden in the same year. To which extent they had Norwegian military backing is unclear.

By the fall of 1205 the brothers were staying at the estate of Älgarås when the Sverker clan attacked. In the ensuing fight all the brothers were slain but Eric. The laconic sources make clear that it was a battle and not merely a mass execution. Eric managed to slip away, according to much later tradition carried from the place of the battle by the legendary Fale Bure.

The estate was burnt down completely and abandoned, and it is no longer known exactly where it was located. An oral tradition says that it was "2000 paces from the church of Älgarås in the direction where the sun rises in September".

While the House of Eric lost this battle, Eric made it to Norway where he stayed for the next 2-3 years. He came back from his exile in 1207-08 and became king of Sweden after he defeated Sverker in the Battle of Lena. Sverker was later killed in the Battle of Gestilren in 1210.
