= Cecilia of Sweden (disambiguation) =

Princess Cecilia of Sweden (1540–1627) was a Swedish princess and the Margravine of Baden-Rodemachern by marriage

Cecilia of Sweden may refer to:

- Cecilia Johansdotter (name uncertain; fl. 1193), wife of King Knut Eriksson of Sweden
- Princess Cecilia of Sweden (1807–1844), Princess of Sweden, Grand Duchess of Oldenburg by marriage
