= Alvastra Abbey =

Monastery ruins in Östergötland, Sweden

Alvastra Monastery
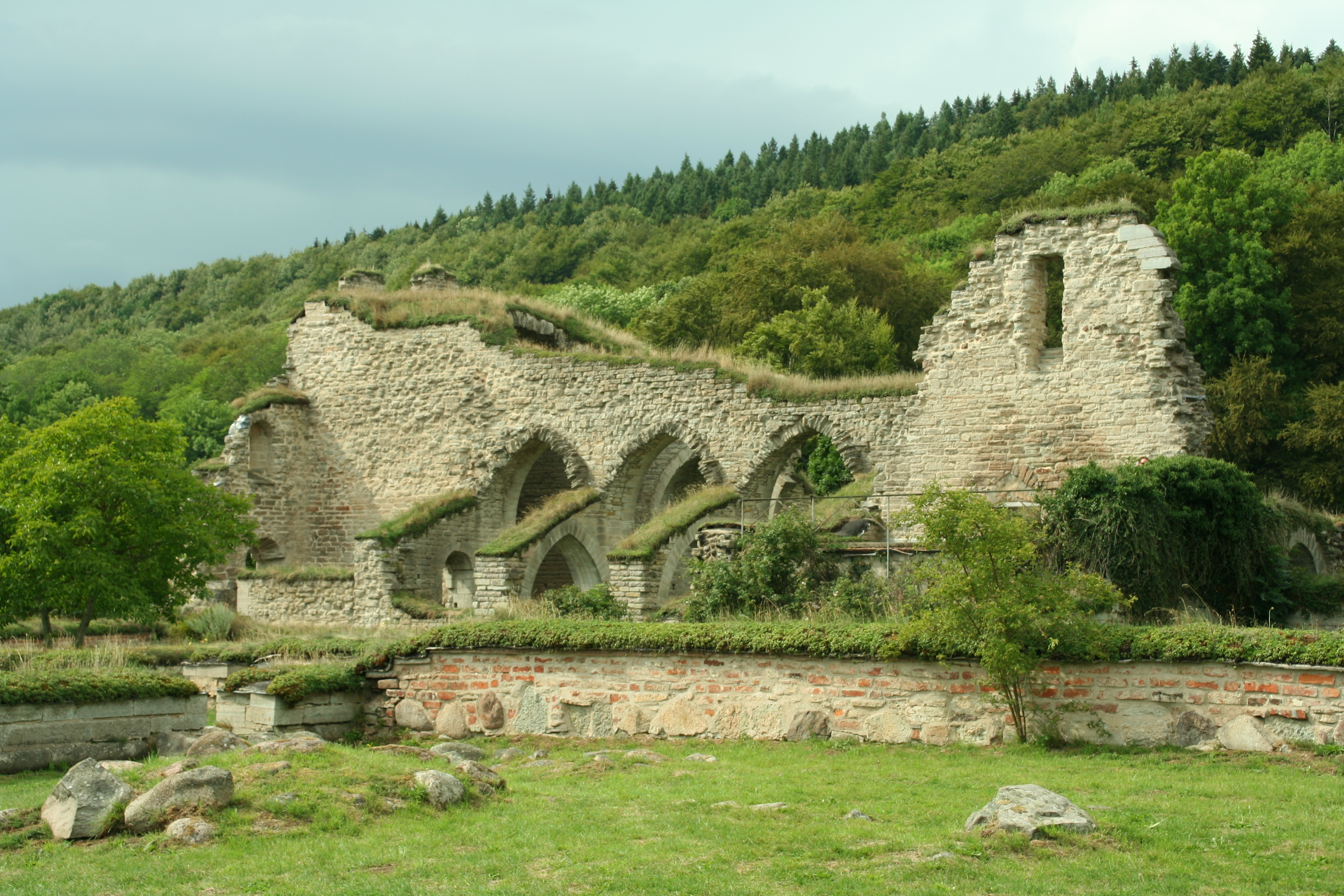
- Ruins of the monastery.

- Location within Östergötland
- Interactive map of Alvastra Monastery

Monastery information
- Order: Cistercians
- Established: 1143; 883 years ago

Site
- Location: Alvastra, Östergötland County, Sweden
- Coordinates: 58°17′48″N 14°39′31″E

Alvastra Abbey (Alvastra klosterruin) was a Cistercian monastery located at Alvastra in Östergötland, Sweden.

== History ==
Alvastra monastery was founded in 1143 by French monks who belonged to the Cistercian Order. A number of monks and lay brothers left the French monastery of Clairvaux Abbey. It was founded at Alvastra in Västra Tollstad parish in Ödeshög municipality on the site of a donation of land by King Sverker I of Sweden. The monastery church was inaugurated in 1185. For nearly 400 years Alvastra monastery prospered. Varnhem Abbey (Varnhems kloster) at Varnhem in Västergötland was founded around 1150 by monks of the Cistercian Order from Alvastra Abbey. Stefan, Archbishop of Uppsala (Stephanus) was a Cistercian monk from Alvastra monastery.

The graves of Kings Sverker I, Carl I, Sverker II and John I, as well as Queens Richeza the Elder, Benedicta and (probably) Ulvhild are to be found in the abbey ruins.

Alvastra monastery was dissolved and appropriated by the Crown at the time of the Protestant Reformation in accordance with the Reduction of Gustav I of Sweden.

== Gallery ==
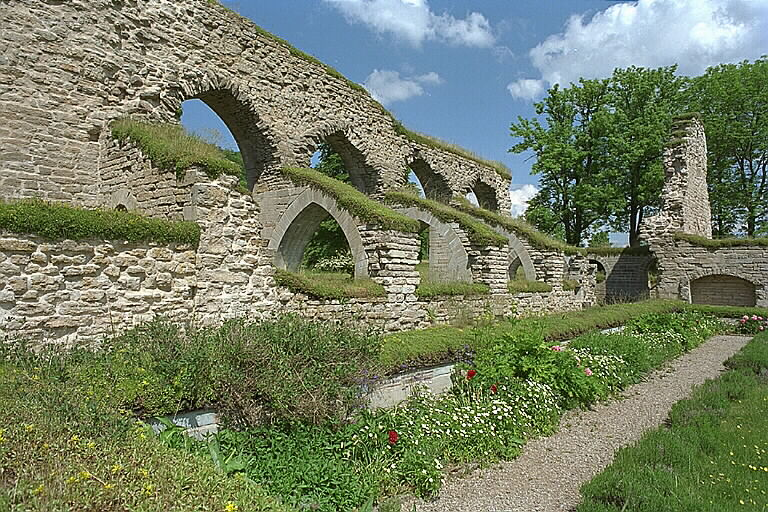

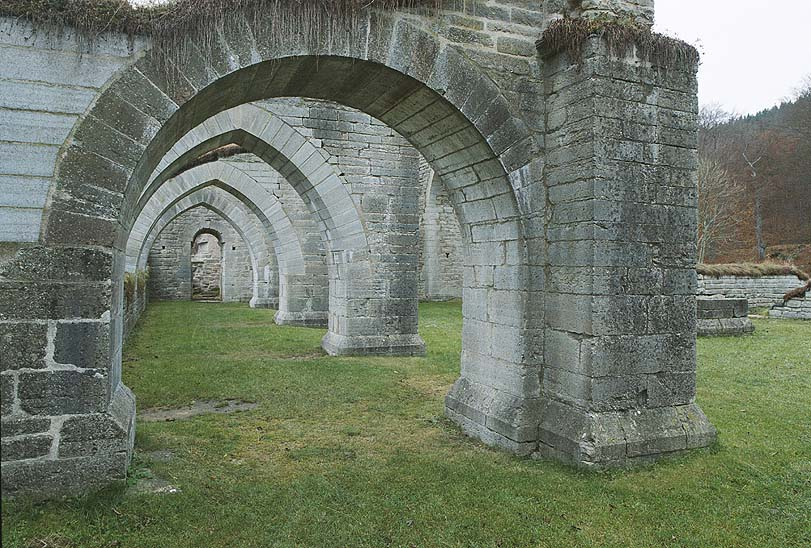

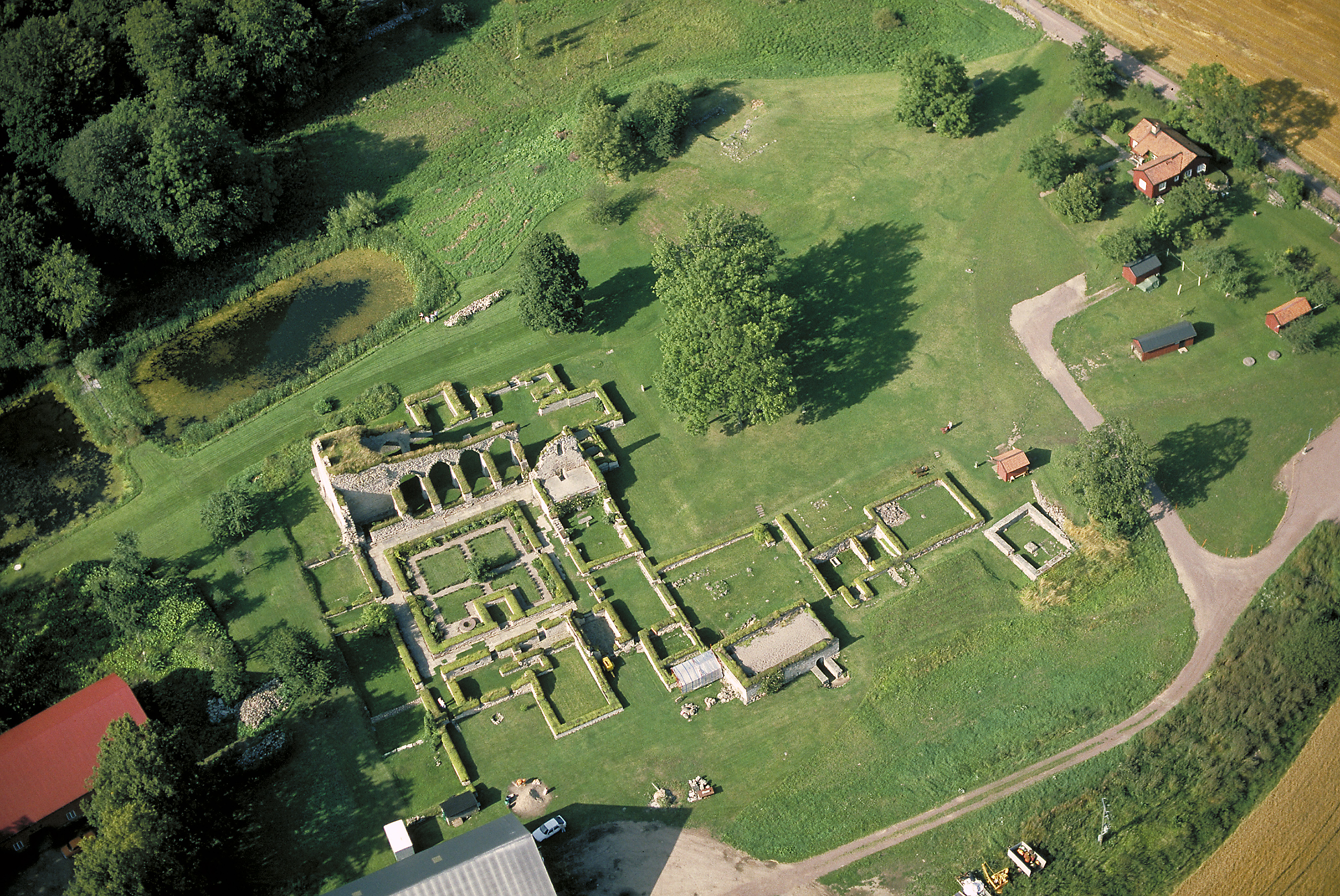
