= Halldórr skvaldri =

Icelandic skald

Halldórr skvaldri (Old Norse: [ˈhɑlːˌdoːrː ˈskwɑldre]; Middle Icelandic: Halldór skvaldri [ˈhalˌtouːr ˈskvaltrɪ]; Halldórr Prattler, or Halldór the Talkative) was an Icelandic skald who lived in the first half of the twelfth century.

He composed the poem Útfarardrápa about the feats of Sigurðr Jórsalafari during his voyage to the Holy Land. After Sigurðr's death he probably served Magnus Barefoot. He is also known to have composed for nine powerful men, including the Swedish jarls Sone Ivarsson (c. 1107), Karl Sonesson (c. 1137) and for the Swedish kings Sverker I of Sweden (c. 1150) and Jon Jarl.

In the assessment of Jan de Vries, Halldórr was an able craftsman ('ein gewandter Verseschmied') but lacked poetic genius.

== Biography and works ==
Halldor was born early enough to compose an elegy for Magnus Barefoot of Norway, who died in 1103, but he also composed one for Inge I of Norway, who died in 1161.

According to Snorri Sturluson's Skáldatal, Halldór wrote elegies (in the Skaldic verse forms of the drápa and flokkr) for:

- Sóni Ívarsson, jarl of Götaland (c. 1100)
- Jarl Karl Sónason (c. 1140, Sweden)
- King Magnús berfœttr ‘Barelegs’ Óláfsson of Norway (d. 1103)
- King Sigurðr jórsalafari ‘Jerusalem-farer’ Magnússon (d. 1130)
- King Haraldr gilli(-kristr) ‘Servant (of Christ)’ Magnússon (d. 1136)
- King Eiríkr eymuni ‘the Long-remembered’ of Denmark (d. 1137)
- King Sørkvir Kolsson of Sweden (c. 1150)
- Jarl Jón Sørkvisson (Sweden).
- King Ingi Haraldsson of Norway (d. 1161)

These poems do not, however, survive.

The surviving parts of Halldórr's corpus are, like most skaldic verse, preserved only as quotations in prose Kings' sagas. These are:

- Útfararkviða: one stanza only, in fornyrðislag, on Sigurðr Jórsalafari's expedition to Palestine and Byzantium around 1108–11, preserved in Magnússona saga, Heimskringla, and Hulda-Hrokkinskinna. There has been some debate about the attribution to Halldórr. The name Útfararkviða was given by the modern editor Finnur Jónsson.
- Útfaradrápa: an account of Sigurðr jórsalafari's expedition to the Mediterranean basin. These stanzas have been identified with the poem which, according to Sverris saga, a skald called Máni 'kvað síðan Útfarardrápuna er Halldórr skvaldri orti um Sigurð konung Jórsalafara, móðurfǫður Magnús konungs' ('later recited the Útfarardrápa which Halldórr skvaldri composed about King Sigurðr Jórsalafari, the maternal grandfather of King Magnus') to Magnus V of Norway in 1184. The poem survives in varying degrees through quotation in Fagrskinna, Magnússona saga, Heimskringla, Morkinskinna, the Third Grammatical Treatise, and Hulda-Hrokkinskinna.
- Haraldsdrápa records King Haraldr gilli(-kristr)'s campaigns against his nephew Magnús inn blindi Sigurðarson in 1134–1135, apparently predating Haraldr's death in 1136. The poem survives in varying degrees in quotations in Codex Frisianus, Fagrskinna, Hulda-Hrokkinskinna, Heimskringla, Magnúss saga blinda og Haralds gilla, and Morkinskinna. The title was coined by modern editors.

== Editions and translations ==
Halldórr's poems are reconstructed as accurately as possible from the surviving quotations in Poetry from the Kings’ Sagas 2: From c. 1035 to c. 1300, ed. by Kari Ellen Gade, Skaldic poetry of the Scandinavian Middle Ages, 2 (Turnhout: Brepols, 2009), pp. 482–96. A text and translation bades on Gade's edition is available at http://www.abdn.ac.uk/skaldic/m.php?p=skald&i=117.
