= Christina Hvide =

Queen of Sweden from 1164 to 1167

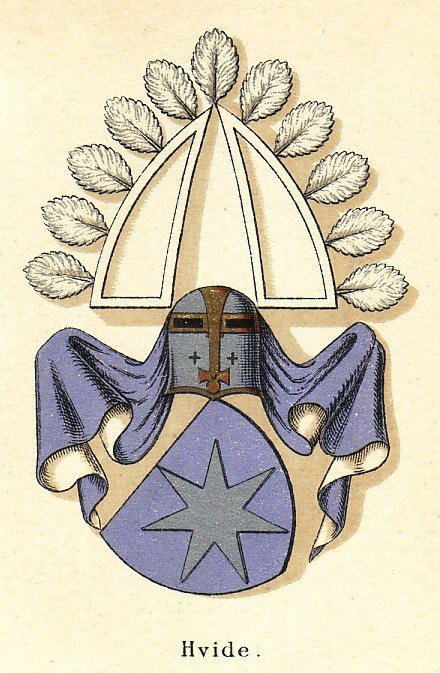
- Hvide arms

Queen consort of Sweden
- Tenure: 1164–1167
- Born: c. 1145
- Died: c. 1200
- Spouse: Charles VII of Sweden
- Issue: Sverker II of Sweden
- Father: Stig Tokesen
- Mother: Margaret of Denmark

Christina Hvide (Swedish: Kristina Stigsdotter; c. 1145 – c. 1200) was Queen of Sweden as the wife of King Charles VII of Sweden and the mother of King Sverker II of Sweden.

== Life ==
Christina was the daughter of the Danish nobleman Stig Tokesen Hvitaledr (died 1150) of the Hvide family from Scania (then a Danish province) and the Danish Princess Margaret of Denmark who was the daughter of Canute Lavard and wife Ingeborg of Kiev. She was married to King Charles VII of Sweden in 1163 (or 1164) and was in Sweden known as Queen Kristina. In 1163, the Swedish jarl Guttorm greeted her in Scania and travelled with her to Sweden, but it is guessed that the ceremony took place after the inauguration of the new archbishop Stefan of Uppsala in 1164. When her husband was deposed in 1167, she fled to Denmark with her son.

The date of her birth and death is not known, but suggested to be c. 1145 and c. 1200 respectively.

Children

- Sverker II of Sweden (1164–1210), King of Sweden 1195–1208.

Christina Stigsdotter Born: 1145 Died: 1200
Swedish royalty
| Preceded by Brigida Haraldsdotter | Queen consort of Sweden; 1163–1167 | Succeeded by Cecilia Johansdotter |
