= Ulvhild Håkansdotter =

12th-century Queen of Denmark and Sweden

Queen consort of Sweden
- Tenure: c. 1117 – c. 1125 c. 1134 – c. 1148

Queen consort of Denmark
- Tenure: c. 1130 – c. 1134
- Born: c. 1095; Norway
- Died: c. 1148 (between 1143 and 1150); Sweden
- Spouses: Inge II of Sweden; Niels of Denmark; Sverker I of Sweden
- Issue: Helena, Queen of Denmark; Jon Sverkersson; Karl, King of Sweden; Ingegerd, Abbess of Vreta
- Father: Haakon Finnsson

Ulvhild Håkansdotter (Swedish: Ulfhild; c. 1095 – c. 1148) was twice Queen of Sweden (c. 1117–25 and c. 1134–48) and once Queen of Denmark (c. 1130–34) through her successive marriages to Inge II of Sweden, Niels of Denmark, and Sverker I of Sweden. Ulvhild had an important role in the Nordic dynastic connections of her time, but the sources are insufficient on detailed circumstances. She is mentioned as a femme fatale of medieval Scandinavia, as well as a benefactor of the Catholic Church.

== Early life ==
Ulvhild originated from Norway. The Norse saga manuscript Fagrskinna mentions her as the daughter of the Norwegian magnate Haakon Finnsson, of the Thjotta family. The name of her mother has not been preserved to later centuries. In modern times it has been suggested that her mother was the former Norwegian and Danish queen Margaret Fredkulla, daughter of Inge I of Sweden. However, this hypothesis cannot be substantiated.

== Queenship ==
Ulvhild was firstly married to King Inge II of Sweden, in about 1116/17. They appear not to have had children. Inge was the junior of two reigning brothers. The elder brother, King Philip died in 1118 under unknown circumstances, leaving Inge as the sole ruler. The short chronicle in the Västgöta Law says that King Inge died of an evil drink in Östergötland. Some later sources place the assassination in Vreta Abbey. The year is not known, but it was no later than c. 1129. The writer Åke Ohlmarks has speculated that Ulvhild became acquainted with her future husband Sverker, a magnate from Östergötland, and made him poison Inge.

Some time after the death of King Inge, Ulvhild moved to Denmark, rather than returning to Norway. Perhaps she did so to claim asylum: she seems to have had relatives and allies in Denmark, whereas political turbulence plagued Sweden. She married King Niels of Denmark after the death of his first queen, Margaret Fredkulla of Sweden, in c. 1130. The marriage more or less coincided with Niels's son Magnus the Strong being accepted as king in parts of Sweden. However, Ulvhild egged her stepson Magnus against his cousin and rival Canute Lavard. Canute was eventually murdered by Magnus in 1131. Civil war now broke out in Denmark, where Niels and Magnus stood against the claimant Eric Emun. Moreover, the marriage was not harmonious, and Niels was some 20–30 years older than his spouse. The chronicler Saxo Grammaticus informs us of the dramatic dissolution:

"While all this was happening, the Swedes, because they had heard that Magnus was engaged in civil wars, appointed as their ruler a certain Sverker, who had come from the ordinary ranks of Swedish society; it was not so much for their high estimation of him as the fact that they rejected a foreigner’s sway, being apprehensive of bowing to an outside leader necks that would ordinarily have submitted to a fellow-countryman. The Norwegian Ulvild, whom Niels had married after Margrete’s death, was first inveigled by this Sverker through mediators bearing love-tokens, and soon afterwards stealthily abducted by the man himself, who brought her to the point of sleeping with him. Treating this union as wedlock, he made her the mother of Karl, a later successor of his to the Swedish crown."

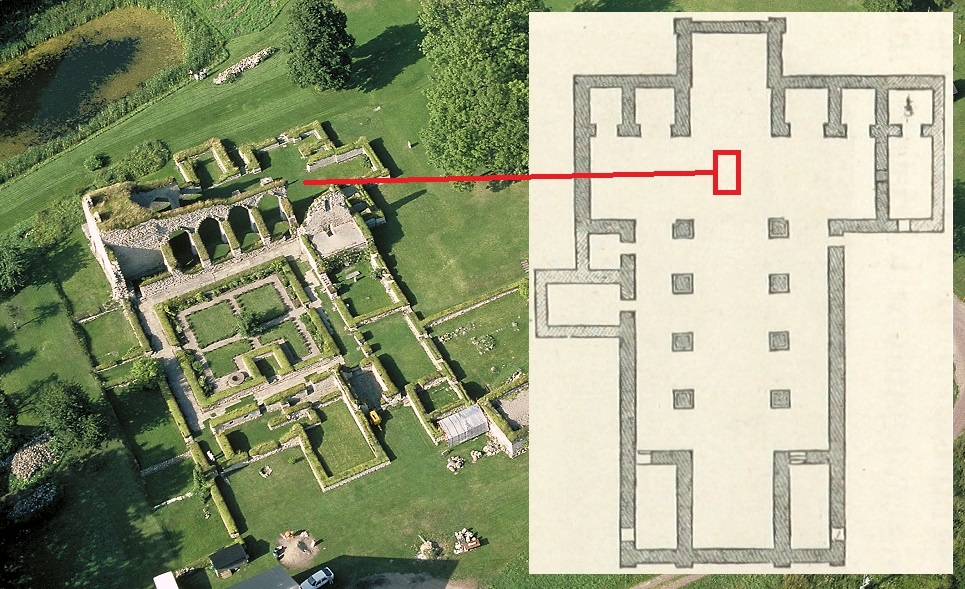
Composite showing the location of Sverker's family grave at Alvastra Abbey where Queen Ulvhild has been assumed to be buried

The event is not dated but must have taken place between 1132 and 1134. The curious elopement story may be explained by Ulvhild's position. Being the widow of Inge II, she represented the estates and influences of the extinct House of Stenkil. Marriage to Ulvhild legitimated the enthronement of the non-royal grandee Sverker, now when her stepson Magnus had been evicted from Sweden. As far as known, no objections (apart from the partial Saxo) were made against her third marriage or against the legitimacy of her children. On the contrary, Ulvhild is praised by clerical sources as a benefactor to the church. The Cistercians were called in on Ulvhild's initiative, and founded the abbeys of Alvastra and Nydala in 1143. Alvastra was even founded on ground which was part of Sverker's bridal gift to Ulvhild.

After at least a decade of queenship, Ulvhild died, some time between 1143 and 1150. Sverker married secondly with Rikissa of Poland, widow of Magnus the Strong, Sverker's earlier rival and opponent. This, too, was a politically motivated marriage which may have aimed to draw the last remains of Magnus's party to Sverker.

== Children and family ==
Ulvhild was married three times; to King Inge II of Sweden in c. 1117, to King Niels of Denmark in c. 1130, and to King Sverker I of Sweden in c. 1134. She had at least two surviving sons and two surviving daughters, all born of her third marriage with Sverker:

- Helena (fl. 1157), Queen consort of Denmark, in 1156 married to king Canute V of Denmark, Rikissa's son. Later nun in Vreta Abbey.
- Jon Sverkersson (d. c. 1152), mentioned as jarl, killed by peasants during last years of his father Sverker.
- Karl Sverkersson (d. 1167), who after his father's murder held (parts of) Götaland, was possibly called jarl and certainly considered his father's heir and dynastical successor, but ultimately succeeded to the throne of Sweden after their dynasty's rivals Erik Jedvardsson (Saint Erik) and Magnus Henriksen.
- Ingegerd Sverkersdotter (d. 1204), Abbess of Vreta Abbey

Some genealogies have Sune Sik as a younger son of King Sverker, being the father of Ingrid Ylva; it is not known if also was a son of Ulvhild.

Ulvhild Håkansdotter House of Thjotta Born: c. 1095 Died: c. 1148
Royal titles
Preceded by Ragnhild	Queen consort of Sweden c. 1117 – c. 1125	Succeeded by Richeza of Poland
Preceded by Richeza of Poland	Queen consort of Sweden c. 1134 – c. 1148	Succeeded by Richeza of Poland
Preceded by Margaret Fredkulla	Queen consort of Denmark c. 1130 – c. 1134	Succeeded by Malmfred
