= Burislev =

12th-century nobleman and pretender to the Swedish throne

Burislev (Boleslaw; died 1172/73) was a Swedish pretender for the throne, belonging to the House of Sverker. He acted in concert with his kinsman Kol against King Canute I of Sweden, then head of the House of Eric. The two pretenders, who were brothers, half-brothers, or uncle and nephew, may never have controlled much more than the province of Östergötland, which was the base of the dynasty. Burislev is believed either to have been murdered by King Canute's men, or to have fled to Poland in or before 1173.

== Background ==
Burislev was a descendant of the old King Sverker I of Sweden (d. 1156), but the exact pedigree is not clear. Sverker married, as his second wife, Richeza of Poland. From this marriage a son called Bulizlaus (Boleslaw, Burislev) was born, as apparent from a Danish administrative document. He was named for his maternal grandfather Bolesław III Wrymouth. Older Swedish historians, such as Natanael Beckman who wrote a biographical article in Svenskt biografiskt lexikon, therefore claimed that Burislev and Kol were sons of Sverker.

However, according to a medieval genealogy, Burislev, Kol and a third brother called Ubbe the Strong were in fact the sons of King Sverker I's son John. On the basis of this, Swedish historians such as Nils Ahnlund and Adolf Schück have claimed instead that there were two different Burislev, uncle and nephew; thus the contenders were indeed sired by John, who died a young man in c. 1152. A medieval list of monastic donations indicates that a certain Ragnhild was the mother of Kol and probably Burislev, and consequently the wife of John. She is known to have survived him and presumably raised her children during the turbulent years following John's and Sverker I's deaths, before entering Vreta Abbey as a nun.

== Civil war ==
Burislev is mentioned in the regnal list appended to Västgötalagen together with Kol: "[King Canute I] won Sweden by sword and killed King Karl, King Kol and King Burislev, had many fights in Sweden and was victorious in all". Otherwise, he appears in fewer medieval sources than his brother whose name occurs in several king-lists. According to annotations by the 17th-century scholar Johannes Messenius, Kol fell in battle, but Burislev continued the struggle against Canute with some success. However, when he carelessly stayed at the mansion of Bjälbo he was assaulted by Canute's troops and killed. Still later traditions have it that Kol and then Burislev were killed in battle at Blodåkrarna (the Blood Fields) close to Bjälbo, in 1169. Most probably, however, the struggle came to an end in 1172–73, since Canute reportedly reigned for 23 years after his victory.

It has been speculated that Canute I married a sister of his antagonists Kol and Burislev whose name was Cecilia, and to whom he was betrothed in c. 1160. This hypothesis is based on an annal entry which mentions a Princess Cecilia, mother of Eric the Saint, as the sister of Kol and Ulf (Ubbe). Eric the Saint, it is argued, might be a mistake for Eric X of Sweden, the son of Canute I. This hypothesis has been disputed, however.

Though several sources affirm that Burislev actually was King of Sweden for a few years, the Swedish Royal Court does not recognize him as such in its official list of rulers.

Preceded by Karl Sverkersson as King of Sweden	King of Östergötland; 1167–1173 with Kol of Sweden	Succeeded by Canute Ericson
