= House of Erik =

Swedish royal dynasty in the 12th–13th centuries

The House of Erik (Swedish: Erikska ätten) was a medieval Swedish royal dynasty with several pretenders to the throne between 1150 and 1220, rivaling for kingship of Sweden with the House of Sverker. The first king from the House of Erik was Erik Jedvardsson, later known as Saint Erik. Almost all the subsequent kings of Sweden have been descendants of the House of Erik. The foremother of the dynasty was Saint Erik's wife Christina Björnsdotter, whom legend claims to have been the maternal granddaughter of Inge the Elder, the king who abolished paganism in Sweden. The House of Erik favored the Varnhem Abbey, and several of its members are interred there.

== History ==
The ancestral estates of the House of Erik appear to have been Västergötland. The forefather of the house was Erik Jedvardsson, who was elected king after the assassination of King Sverker the Elder in 1156. Erik himself was killed in 1160 by the Danish lord Magnus Henriksen while attending a mass. Magnus ruled part of Sweden briefly, but was soon slain by Karl Sverkersson, who took the throne.

In 1167, the House of Erik returned to power when Knut Eriksson, son of Erik Jedvardsson, killed King Karl. The struggle against the House of Sverker continued until 1172–73, when Knut finally secured his hold on the kingdom. To strengthen his claim to the throne, Knut and Uppsala Cathedral promoted the sainthood of his father, Erik. Knut ruled until his natural death in 1195 or 1196.

After Knut's death, Sverker Karlsson from the rival house was elected king, and ruled until 1208 he was defeated in battle by Knut's son Erik Knutsson. Sverker attempted to return to power two years later, but was again defeated and died in battle. Erik died of natural causes in 1216. His only son, Erik Eriksson, was born after his death. Erik Knutsson was followed as king by Johan Sverkersson, who came to be the last Sverker king.

King Johan died unmarried and childless in 1222, and the six-year-old Erik Eriksson was elected king. Two branches of the dynasty came into conflict in 1226 when Knut Holmgersson (Knut Långe), allegedly the adult heir of Filip, younger son of Saint Erik, deposed the underage Erik Eriksson and exiled him to Denmark. Erik Eriksson resumed the kingship in 1234 after Knut Långe's death. Conflict continued between the royal senior branch and Knut's two sons until the sons were executed in 1248 and 1251.

Erik Eriksson was the last king of the male line of this dynasty. He died in 1250, apparently with no surviving children. His nephew Valdemar, the underage son of Erik's sister Ingeborg and Birger Jarl of the Bjälbo family, was elected king, with his father Birger acting as a regent.

Descent from this dynasty was regarded as such hard currency in medieval and early modern power games that King Karl Knutsson even fabricated a lineage (see Tofta, Adelsö) to claim that he, too, was an heir of the House of Erik.

== List of kings of the House of Erik ==
Portrait	Name	Reign	Succession	Marriage(s)	Life details
	Erik Jedvardsson "the Holy"	c. 1157 – 18 May 1160 (c. 3 years)	Cousin of Sverker I	Christina of Denmark (4 children)	c. 1120 – 18 May 1160 (aged approx. 40) Attempted to christianize Finland. Murdered by the pretender Magnus Henriksson and later canonized, becoming Sweden's patron saint.
	Knut Eriksson	12 April 1167 – 1196 (29 years)	Son of Erik Jedvardsson. Seized power after murdering Karl Sverkersson.	Cecilia Johansdotter (name disputed) (5 children)	Before 1150 – 1196 (older than 46)
	Erik Knutsson "the Survivor"	1208 – 10 April 1216 (8 years)	Son of Knut Eriksson. Seized power after defeating Sverker II in battle.	Rikissa of Denmark (5 children)	1180 – 10 April 1216 (aged c. 36)
	Erik Eriksson "the Lisp and Lame"	March 1222 – 1229 (7 years) (first reign)	Son of Erik Knutsson	Catherine Sunesdotter (childless)	1216 – 2 February 1250 (aged c. 34) Largely overshadowed by prominent statesmen. Deposed and in exile 1229–1234.
	Knut Holmgersson "the Tall"	1229 – 1234 (5 years)	Relative of the House of Erik. Elected king after the deposition of Erik Eriksson.	Unknown queen (at least 2 children)	Died 1234
	Erik Eriksson "the Lisp and Lame"	1234 – 2 February 1250 (16 years) (second reign)	Returned and regained power after Knut Holmgersson's death	Catherine Sunesdotter (childless)	(see entry for previous reign)

== See also ==
- List of Swedish monarchs

== Bibliography ==
- Bolin, Sture (1953g). "Knut långe". Svenskt biografiskt lexikon (in Swedish).
- Bolin, Sture (1953h). "Erik Eriksson". Svenskt biografiskt lexikon (in Swedish).
- Bolin, Sture (1953l). "Knut Eriksson". Svenskt biografiskt lexikon (in Swedish).
- Bolin, Sture (1953n). "Erik Knutsson". Svenskt biografiskt lexikon (in Swedish).
- Liljegren, Bengt (2004). Rulers of Sweden (in Swedish). Stockholm: Historiska Media. ISBN 9789185057634.
- Venning, Timothy (2023). A Compendium of Medieval World Sovereigns. Taylor & Francis. ISBN 9781000866339.
- Williamson, David (1988). Debrett's Kings and Queens of Europe. London: Webb & Bower. ISBN 0-86350-194-X.

*Royal House* House of Erik
Preceded by House of Sverker	Ruling house of the Kingdom of Sweden; 1156–1160; 1167–1196*; 1208–1216; 1222–1229; 1234–1250 * In 1167–1173, not in the province of Östergötland.	Succeeded by House of Bjälbo
