= House of Sverker =

Medieval Swedish royal dynasty

The House of Sverker were a powerful political force in medieval Sweden, contesting for royal power. Their origins were in Östergötland. After the extinction of the House of Stenkil and the ascension of Sverker I of Sweden in 1130, a civil war commenced. In the beginning, there were several pretenders, of whom Sverker I emerged as victorious, for a time. The antagonists in the long run were finally the House of Sverker in Östergötland and the House of Eric in Västergötland and Uppland (Saint Eric was killed and buried in the latter province, others in the dynasty were buried in Varnhem Abbey in the former province as later also Birger Jarl was, a relative to the dynasty), which alternated on the throne for several generations, until in the 1220s the Eric dynasty got the upper hand, and the Sverker dynasty became extinct (at least in the male line).

As usual in medieval succession rivalries, the outcome combined the blood of rival lines, as in 1250 Valdemar of the House of Bjälbo (then a minor, his father Birger Jarl acting as regent) ascended the throne, having inherited the Eric dynasty claim from Valdemar's mother (who was sister of Eric XI of Sweden, the last Eric-dynast) and some of the Sverker dynasty claim from Birger's mother (who was daughter of a younger son of Sverker I).

== Kings of the house of Sverker ==
Portrait	Name	Reign	Succession	Marriage(s)	Life details
Non-contemporary depiction	Sverker I "the Elder"; Sverker den äldre	c. 1130 – 25 December 1156 (c. 26 years)	Either no previous royal connection or grandson of Blot-Sweyn. Elected in opposition to Magnus I.	Ulvhild Håkansdotter (at least 4 children); Richeza of Poland (1 child?)	Died 25 December 1156 Assassinated, allegedly by the pretender Magnus II.
	Charles (VII); Karl Sverkersson	c. 1157 – 12 April 1167 (c. 10 years; ruled all of Sweden from 1161 onwards)	Son of Sverker I. Initially ruled in Västergötland in opposition to Eric IX; later overthrew Magnus II.	Christina Hvide (at least 1 child)	1130 – 12 April 1167 (aged 37) Murdered by Canute I, who succeeded him as king.
	Kol (status disputed)	1170s (several years)	Sons (?) of Sverker I. Ruled together in Östergötland, in opposition to Canute I.	Nothing recorded	Few life details known
	Boleslaw; Burislev (status disputed)	1170s (several years)	Sons (?) of Sverker I. Ruled together in Östergötland, in opposition to Canute I.	Nothing recorded	Few life details known
	Sverker II "the Younger"; Sverker (den yngre) Karlsson	1196 – 1208 (12 years)	Son of Charles VII	Benedicta Hvide (at least 1 child)	c. 1164 – 17 July 1210 (aged c. 46) Deposed after the Battle of Lena. Killed at the Battle of Gestilren while trying to retake the throne.
	Sverker II "the Younger"; Sverker (den yngre) Karlsson	1196 – 1208 (12 years)	Son of Charles VII	Ingegerd Birgersdotter (at least 1 child)	c. 1164 – 17 July 1210 (aged c. 46) Deposed after the Battle of Lena. Killed at the Battle of Gestilren while trying to retake the throne.
	John I Johan Sverkersson	10 April 1216 – 10 March 1222 (5 years and 11 months)	Son of Sverker II	Unmarried and childless	1201 – 10 March 1222 (aged c. 21) Died of illness as the last male-line member of Sverker's dynasty.

== See also ==
- List of Swedish monarchs
- Norse clans

== Bibliography ==
- Bolin, Sture (1953f). "Johan Sverkersson". Svenskt biografiskt lexikon (in Swedish).
- Bolin, Sture (1953i). "Sverker den äldre". Svenskt biografiskt lexikon (in Swedish).
- Bolin, Sture (1953k). "Karl Sverkersson". Svenskt biografiskt lexikon (in Swedish).
- Bolin, Sture (1953m). "Sverker den yngre". Svenskt biografiskt lexikon (in Swedish).
- Harrison, Dick (2014), Jourhavande historiker rycker ut igen: Hur är det med Macbeth, Blot-Sven och Gandalf? (in Swedish), Norstedts, ISBN 9789113059631
- Liljegren, Bengt (2004). Rulers of Sweden (in Swedish). Stockholm: Historiska Media. ISBN 9789185057634.
- Venning, Timothy (2023). A Compendium of Medieval World Sovereigns. Taylor & Francis. ISBN 9781000866339.
- Williamson, David (1988). Debrett's Kings and Queens of Europe. London: Webb & Bower. ISBN 0-86350-194-X.

*Royal House* House of Sverker
Preceded by House of Stenkil	Ruling House of the Kingdom of Sweden c. 1130 – 1156; 1161–1167; 1196–1208; 1216–1222	Succeeded by House of Eric
