= Kol of Sweden =

Swedish prince

Kol (died about 1173) was a Swedish prince who, together with his brother Burislev was a contender for the throne of Sweden from 1167 until his violent death a few years later. The struggle was a stage in the rivalry between the House of Sverker, to which Kol and Burislev belonged, and the House of Eric.

== Background ==
In most older literature Kol is called Kol Sverkersson, based on an unverifiable assumption that he was a son of King Sverker I of Sweden. The only source that says anything about his parentage is, however, a medieval genealogy copied by Olaus Petri in the 16th century: "Suercherus Rex senior ... genuit Carolum Regem et Johannem ducem et Sunonem Sijk ... Johannes dux genuit Koll Regem, Ubbe fortem et Burislevum Regem". In other words, the genealogy claims he was a grandson of Sverker and a son of Prince John, and that his brothers were Ubbe the Strong and King Burislev. A medieval list of donations indicates that the mother of Kol was called Ragnhild. She might have been a relative of the jarl Guttorm who donated land to Vreta Abbey on her behalf.

The suggestion that he was a son of Sverker is based on a Danish source which mentions that Sverker had a son Boleslaw (Burislev). This son has been identified by some historians (such as Nathanael Beckman in Svenskt biografiskt lexikon) as the throne contender by the same name, and thus Kol has also been assigned Sverker I for a father.

== Strife for kingship ==
Prince John was killed in an incident by the Swedish peasantry around 1152. Since he was a young man at his death, his sons must still have been infants. Kol's uncle Charles VII of Sweden was killed by Canute I of Sweden on Visingsö in 1167. Now Kol was recognized at least in parts of Sweden, presumably in Östergötland which was the basis of the dynasty's power. He held the throne in opposition to Canute for a few years, in tandem with his brother or uncle Burislev. The short chronicle of the Westrogothic law relates the few known details: "[King Canute I] won Sweden by sword and killed King Karl, King Kol and King Burislev, had many fights in Sweden and was victorious in all". A little more is known about Kol from medieval donation lists. He owned land in Frönäs on Öland and donated it to his mother Ragnhild, who in turn gave it to Vreta Abbey when she entered the abbey as a nun. A papal letter from 1171 or 1172 mentions a "K." who was king of the Swedes and Geats; it is not clear whether Kol or Canute (Knut) is meant. Kol was probably killed in battle or murdered by Canute's men around 1173. A 14th-century source claims that he was killed at Bjälbo. After his death, his kinsfolk donated land to Vreta Abbey for his soul, indicating that they were able to keep properties after Canute's victory.

Though some sources affirm that Kol actually was King of Sweden for a few years, the Swedish Royal Court does not recognize him as such in its official list of rulers.

== Sources ==
Kol House of Sverker Died: 1173
Regnal titles
Preceded by Karl Sverkersson as King of Sweden	King of Östergötland; 1167–1173 with Boleslaw of Sweden	Succeeded by Knut Eriksson as King of Sweden
