= Sverker the Elder =

King of Sweden from c. 1132 to 1156

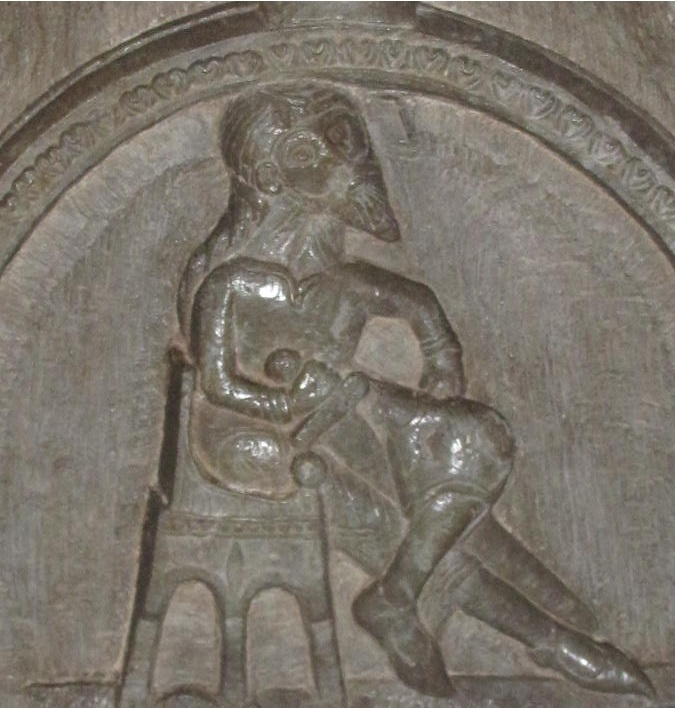
- Proposed relief of King Sverker in Heda Church

King of Sweden
- Reign: c. 1132 – 25 December 1156
- Predecessor: Magnus Nielsen
- Successor: Saint Erik
- Born: c. 1100
- Died: 25 December 1156 (aged approximately 56); Near Alvastra, Sweden
- Spouse: Ulvhild Håkansdotter; Richeza of Poland
- Issue: Karl Sverkersson; Johan Sverkersson
- House: Sverker
- Father: Cornube

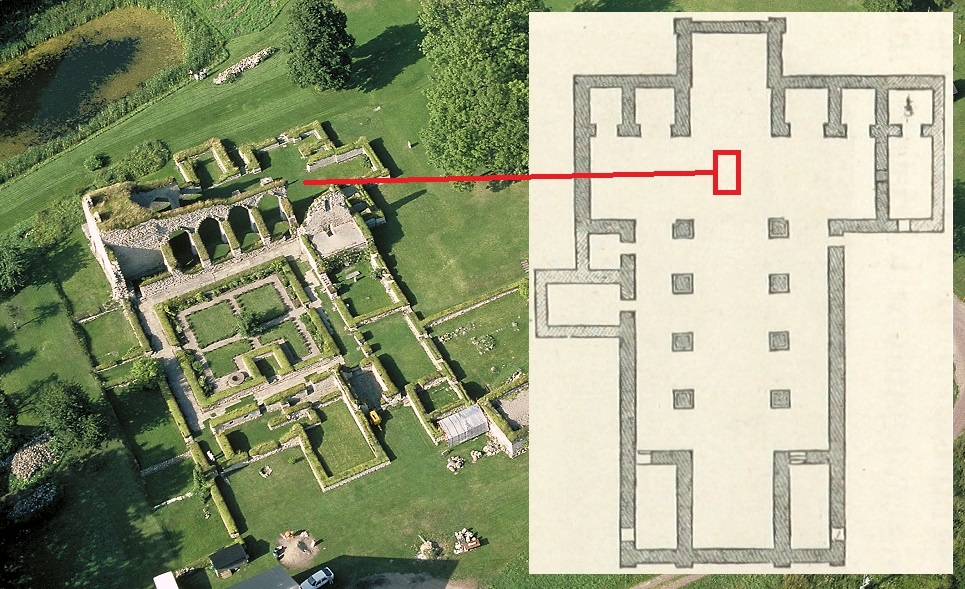
Composite showing the location of Sverker's family grave at Alvastra

Sverker the Elder (Old Swedish: Swærkir konongær gambli; c. 1100 – 25 December 1156), also known as Sverker I, was King of Sweden from about 1132 until his murder. Of non-royal descent, he founded the House of Sverker, the rulers of which alternated with the rival House of Erik over the next century.

== Origins ==
Sverker was a wealthy landowner from Östergötland. According to the Västgöta Law (c. 1240), his father's name was Cornube, but according to the Icelandic Skáldatal, his father's name was Kol. A later pedigree has the filiation Kettil – Kol – Kornike (Cornube) – Sverker. He rose to power after the extinction of the House of Stenkil in the 1120s. The Danish prince Magnus Nielsen was acknowledged as king in Götaland for a while, although the extent of his actual power is not clear. However, Magnus's involvement in the civil strife in his homeland gave opportunities for Sverker to act. According to the partial account of Saxo Grammaticus, "the Swedes, when they heard that Magnus was busy with war in Denmark, took one of their fellow countrymen, a man of modest ancestry by the name of Sverker, as their king; not because they appreciated him in particular, but since they would not stand under the rule of a foreigner." From the order of events in Saxo's chronicle, this took place in c. 1132.

== Consolidation of power ==
It appears that Sverker was only slowly recognized by the various provinces of the kingdom. Norwegian sources speak of several separate actions taken by the elite of Västergötland in the 1130s, indicating a high degree of separatism. The jarl of Västergötland, Karl of Edsvära, settled the Norwegian-Geatish border with King Harald Gille in 1135 and is even termed "king" in a source. The same goes for the provinces around Lake Mälaren where Magnus still had adherents. Bishop Henrik of Sigtuna was expelled from Sweden and fell at the side of Magnus in the Battle of Fotevik in 1134. Sverker was acknowledged in the Mälaren provinces by 1135, when he received the Danish pretender Oluf Haraldsen, whom he supported in his quest for power in Skåne. At least by the 1140s the authority of Sverker was generally acknowledged in the loosely structured kingdom. The basis of his power was the central plain of Östergötland with the church of Kaga, Alvastra Abbey and Vreta Abbey as religious supporting sites.

Sverker took care to anchor his legitimacy through his marriage policy. According to the hostile account of Saxo Grammaticus, "Niels [of Denmark] married Ulvhild from Norway ... Sverker sent envoys to her and asked for her love. Shortly afterwards, he clandestinely brought her from her husband and made her marry him". The outrageous behaviour of Sverker may be explained by the background of Ulvhild; she had previously been married to Inge II of Sweden, the last of the House of Stenkil, and therefore represented the influence and properties of the extinct dynasty. After the death of Ulvhild he married the widow of his old enemy Magnus the Strong, the Polish princess Richeza, presumably in an effort to bring over the last adherents of Magnus to his side. The marriage gave him control over Richeza's daughter Sophia of Minsk, who was engaged with the future king Valdemar the Great of Denmark in 1154, and married him after Sverker's death.

== Clerical policy ==
Sverker based much of his royal authority on his patronage of the Church. The Cistercians were called in on the initiative of Queen Ulvhild and founded a number of abbeys: Alvastra in Östergötland, Varnhem in Västergötland, and Nydala in Småland. The king also strove to achieve Swedish ecclesiastic autonomy. The papal delegate Nicholas Breakspear toured Scandinavia in 1152 and was received by Sverker with great honours. During a meeting in Linköping, the installation of Peter's pence (papal tax) for Sweden was probably decided. However, the plans of installing a Swedish archbishopric were stalled, according to Saxo since "the Swedes and Geats could not agree what town and person was worthy of the dignity". Therefore, Nicholas Breakspear "refused the quarreling parts this honour and did not endow these still religiously ignorant barbarians the highest clerical dignity". When he later on visited Denmark, Breakspear promised the archbishop of Lund the primacy over any future Swedish archbishop. This was later confirmed when Breakspear became pope under the name Hadrianus IV. An archbishopric was only installed in 1164 in the reign of Sverker's son Karl Sverkersson.

== Foreign policy ==
Swedish relations with the Russian principalities had been good for the past century or more, but in the reign of Sverker there was a turn towards enmity. According to a Russian chronicle, the newly founded Republic of Novgorod had its first confrontation with Sweden at this time, breaking a century-long peace that had been guaranteed by marriages between the ruling families. The Swedish "knyaz" (Russian for ruling prince) and bishop arrived in the Finnish Gulf with 60 boats in 1142, and made an abortive attack on a fleet of traders. The further circumstances of the expedition are entirely lacking; it may have aimed to subdue non-Christian peoples east of the Baltic Sea.

A more serious confrontation took place in another direction in the 1150s. Sverker received his stepson, the Danish co-ruler Canute V when the latter was in trouble at home. This support was a threat to Canute's rival, Sweyn III of Denmark. Moreover, Sverker's son Johan abducted two noblewomen in Halland in Denmark "in order to satisfy his lust", although his father and the people forced him to eventually return the ladies. Nicholas Breakspear tried in vain to dissuade King Sweyn from invading Sweden, since "the land was difficult for waging warfare and the people were poor, so there was no advantage to seek there." However, Sweyn believed it was the right moment to strike, since Prince John had been slain by the peasantry at a Thing and, as a result, a conflict arose between them and Sverker. Moreover, Sverker was by now an old man with little taste for war.

King Sweyn proceeded to lead an expedition into the forested province Småland in southern Sweden in 1153, with the professed aim to subjugate Sweden. Sverker kept passive and did not meet the invaders in open battle, but the local populations resisted furiously and ambushed the Danes where they could. The war was fought in the cold of the winter; a large part of the horses of the invaders died from exhaustion and lack of fodder. Although the inhabitants of Värend submitted, Sweyn was forced to sneak back to Denmark in early 1154. Part of the army returned via Finnveden whose peasantry invited the soldiers to a feast, then assaulted and massacred them. The incident might have inspired the 17th-century local legend of Blenda.

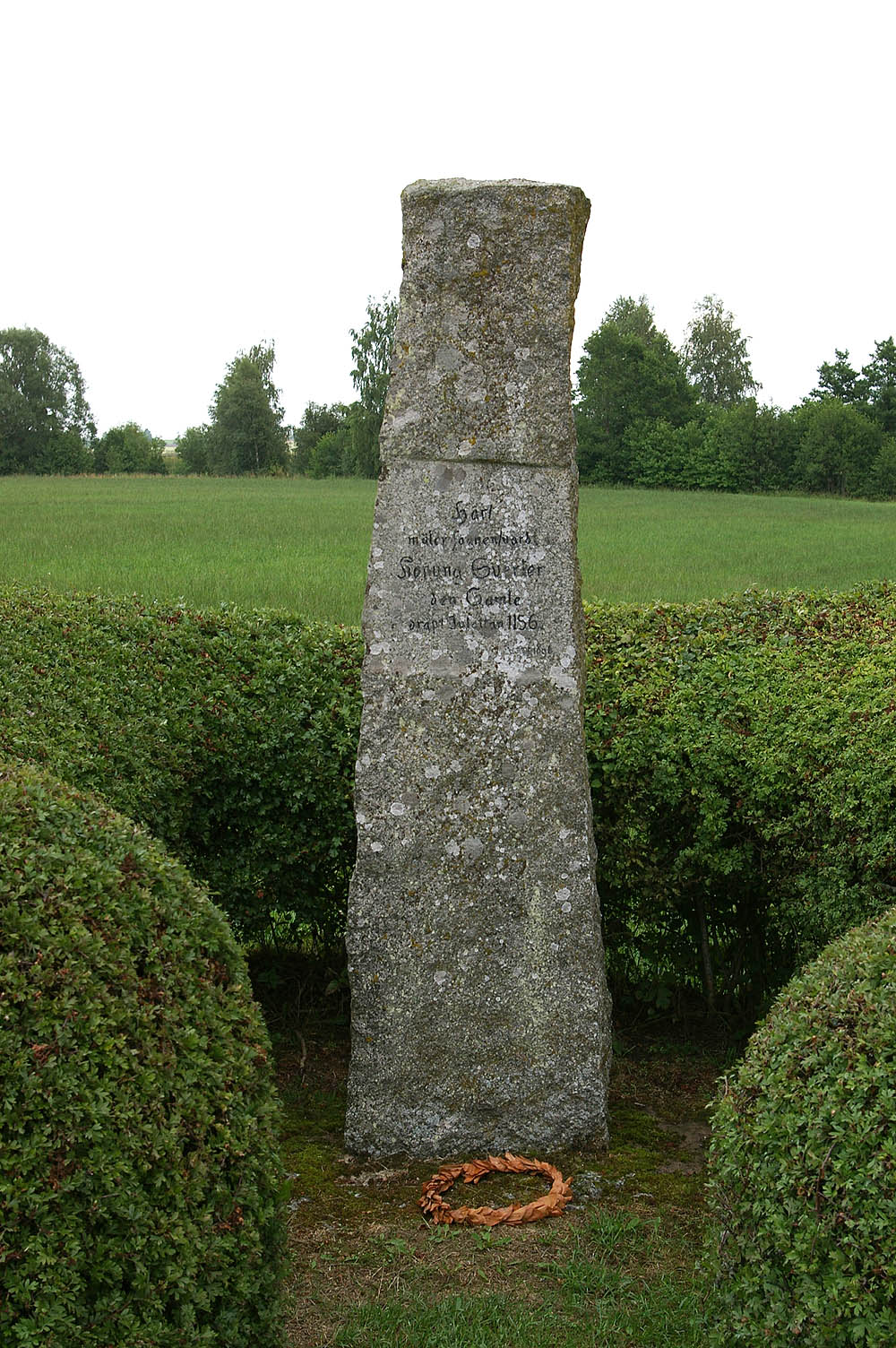
The Sverker Stone (Sverkerstenen) monument at the site of the assassination.

The war thus abruptly came to an end, and did not stop Sverker's association with Canute V. Sweyn III had hitherto been closely allied with the other Danish pretender Valdemar, the future King Valdemar the Great, but the latter was now drawn to Canute's side. Realizing the adverse attitude of Sweyn, Canute and Valdemar visited Sverker in 1154 with an eye to a marriage alliance. According to the probably exaggerated account of Saxo, "Sverker received them so friendly, that he, hoping for a future son-in-law, offered to make them his heirs while passing over his own children, either because of the incompetence of his sons or the high birth of the distinguished wooer." Thus Canute V was betrothed to his host's daughter Helena. It also appears that Canute as well as Valdemar owned landed property in Sweden at the time. With the alliance with Sverker in their back, the two pretenders were able to attack Sweyn III successfully in the same year.

== The assassination of Sverker ==
The short chronicle of the Västgöta Law says that Sverker was murdered in his own coach at the Alebäck bridge near Alvastra priory, going to an early religious service on Christmas Day, 1156. The assassin was his trusted servant, a detail that is confirmed by a papal letter. This was considered a shocking crime, even by medieval standards. According to Saxo, the pretender Magnus Henriksen, a Danish prince, "made the servant commit this murder out of clandestine desire to become king". Sverker was succeeded in parts of Sweden by a pretender from another family, Eric the Saint, under very obscure circumstances. However, Sverker's son Karl Sverkersson emerged as king in Östergötland by c. 1158.

Skáldatal reports the names of two of Sverker's skalds: Einarr Skúlason and Halldórr skvaldri.

== Family ==
By first wife Queen Ulvhild Håkansdotter, widow of Inge the Younger, and who escaped from her second husband, King Niels of Denmark:

- Son Johan or Jon Jarl, slain by enraged peasants during a meeting of the Thing in the early 1150s, possibly father of Cecilia
- Son Karl, Sverker's successor
- Daughter Ingegärd (died in 1204), prioress of Vreta convent
- Daughter Helena of Sweden (uncertain name), married to Canute V of Denmark, son of King Magnus Nielsen

By second wife Queen Richeza (after Ulvhild's death), previously married to Magnus Nielsen and to Volodar of Minsk. Attested son of this marriage was:

- Son Boleslaw, possibly identical with Burislev.

By one of these queens or an unknown woman:

- Allegedly a son Sune, thought to have been born about 1154.

== Literature ==
- Ahnlund, Nils. "Vreta klosters äldsta donatorer", Historisk tidskrift 65, 1945.
- Harrison, Dick. Sveriges historia 600–1350. Stockholm: Norstedts, 2009 (ISBN 978-91-1-302377-9).
- Lagerqvist Lars O., Åberg Nils. Kings and Rulers of Sweden. Vincent Publications, 2002 (ISBN 91-87064-35-9).
- Liljegren, Bengt. Rulers of Sweden. Historiska Media, 2004 (ISBN 91-85057-63-0).
- Sawyer, Peter. När Sverige blev Sverige. Alingsås: Viktoria, 1991 (ISBN 91-86708-12-0).
- Saxo Grammaticus. Danmarks kronike, Vol. I-II. Kobenhavn: Aschenfeldt's, 1985 (ISBN 87-414-4524-4).
- Tunberg, Sven. Sveriges historia till våra dagar. Andra delen. Äldre medeltiden. Stockholm: P.A. Norstedt & Söners Förlag, 1926.
- Västgötalagen, https://project2.sol.lu.se/fornsvenska/01_Bitar/A.L5.D-Vidhem.html
- Wallin, Curt. Knutsgillena i det medeltida Sverige. Kring kulten av de nordiska helgonkungarna [Historiskt arkiv, 16]. Stockholm: Almqvist & Wicksell, 1975 (ISBN 91-7402-006-4).

Sverker the Elder House of Sverker Born: ca. 1100 Died: 25 December 1156
Regnal titles
Vacant Title last held by Ragnvald Knaphövde	King of Sweden c. 1132–1156	Succeeded by Saint Erik
Preceded by Magnus Nielsen as King of Götaland	King of Sweden c. 1132–1156	Succeeded by Saint Erik
