= Karl Sverkersson =

King of Sweden from c. 1161 to 1167

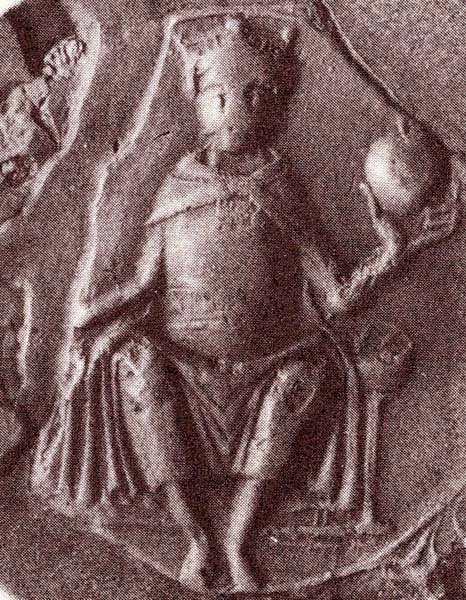
- King Karl as shown on his seal

King of Sweden
- Reign: c. 1161 – 1167
- Predecessor: Magnus Henriksen
- Successor: Knut Eriksson
- Born: c. 1130
- Died: 12 April 1167
- Spouse: Christina Hvide
- Issue: Sverker the Younger
- House: Sverker
- Father: Sverker the Elder
- Mother: Ulvhild Håkansdotter

Karl Sverkersson or Charles VII (c. 1130 – 12 April 1167) was the ruler of Götaland, and then King of Sweden from c. 1161 to 1167, when he was assassinated in a military attack by Knut Eriksson who then succeeded him as king.

== Pretender to the throne ==
Karl was the son of King Sverker the Elder, who was assassinated in December 1156, by first wife Ulvhild Håkansdotter. A pretender from another family, Erik Jedvardsson (whom later generations dubbed martyr and saint), ruled over parts of Sweden in the following years. However, Karl was chosen king by the people of Östergötland in c. 1158, apparently in opposition to Erik. A letter from pope Hadrianus IV (d. 1159) knows him as ruler of regnum Gothorum although Erik is known to have held power in Västergötland. It is claimed in a late medieval chronicle that Erik's murder by minions of their rival Magnus Henriksen in 1160 was also backed by Karl.

Magnus Henriksen had a brief reign after killing Erik, but was himself killed by Karl Sverkersson, probably in 1161 during the battle at Örebro. After the fall of Magnus, Karl received general recognition in Sweden as king. In fact he is the first Swedish ruler to be expressly titled rex Sweorum et Gothorum (King of the Swedes and Geats) in a papal letter from 1164.

== Reign ==
The brief reign of Karl Sverkersson is important from a number of aspects. The early medieval Swedish kingdom resembled a network of shifting aristocratic alliances rather than a state, but during the second half of the 12th century, it slowly began to converge with the Catholic-European state model. It was during his time that the Archbishop of Uppsala was established, although Sweden was still ecclesiastically subordinated to the Danish archbishop in Lund. After a request by the king, his jarl Ulf, and the Swedish bishops, the pope appointed Stefan, a former monk in Alvastra Abbey, as the first archbishop. Shortly afterwards, the people of Värend at the border to Denmark offered money to the king if he supported the installation of a particular bishop in Växjö. He is also known to have donated land and privileges to Vreta Abbey and Nydala Abbey. The donations suggest that his main interests lay in the provinces of Östergötland and Småland, while the provinces around Lake Mälaren may have been supervised by Ulf Jarl. The first known non-epigraphic document was issued in his time, which also contains the earliest known royal seal.

Swedish relations with the Russian lands had been quite good up to the early 12th century. However, this changed into a state of intermittent hostility during the 12th century. The chronicles of Novgorod relate a sea-borne Swedish invasion in 1164. The invading forces attacked Ladoga, which however received Novgorodian relief forces after five days. The Swedes were thoroughly beaten outside Ladoga on 28 May and lost 43 out of 55 boats. The remnants withdrew.

== Assassination ==
In the spring of 1167, King Karl was killed on the island of Visingsö by supporters of Knut Eriksson, head of the rival Eric dynasty. "But his son Sverker was carried to Denmark in the lap, and his journey was miserable." Knut usurped the throne. Karl Sverkersson was buried in Alvastra monastery. Like the other kings of the House of Sverker, he is lauded by the short chronicle in Västgöta Law: "As king, he had his father's dignity. He ruled Sweden with gentleness and benevolence."

Starting from Karl Sverkersson's death, his kinsmen (either half-brothers or possibly nephews) Burislev and Kol together opposed Knut's kingship and were rival kings recognized in parts of Götaland. However, the last of them was killed around 1172–1173, after which Knut's rule was fully recognized.

== Family ==
Karl's wife was Christina Hvide, daughter of the Danish nobleman Stig Tokesen and the Danish Princess Margaret of Denmark.

Their sole historically attested child was Sverker Karlsson, a young boy when Karl died, and who later was elected king of Sweden (1195–1208/10) after the death of King Knut Eriksson.

Karl Sverkersson House of Sverker Born: c. 1130 Died: April 12 1167
Regnal titles
Preceded by Magnus Henriksen	King of Sweden; 1161–1167	Succeeded by Knut Eriksson
