= Knut Eriksson =

King of Sweden from 1173 to 1195

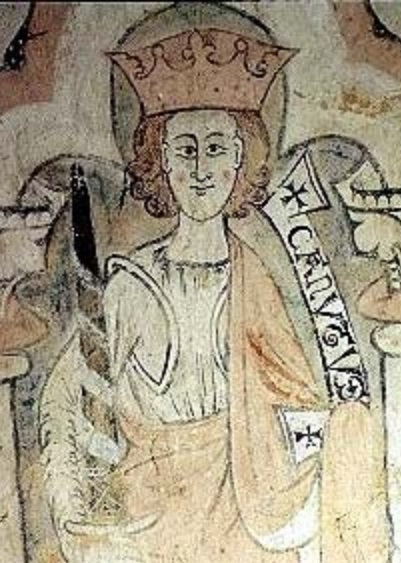
- Knut Eriksson (Canute I) depicted at Old Dädesjö Church, c. 1290

King of Sweden
- Reign: 1173–1195/96
- Predecessor: Karl Sverkersson
- Successor: Sverker Karlsson
- Born: Before 1150
- Died: 1195/96
- Spouse: Cecilia Johansdotter (traditionally)
- Issue more...: Erik Knutsson
Names
- Swedish: Knut Eriksson; Old Norse: Knútr Eiríksson
- House: Erik
- Father: Saint Erik
- Mother: Christina Bjørnsdatter

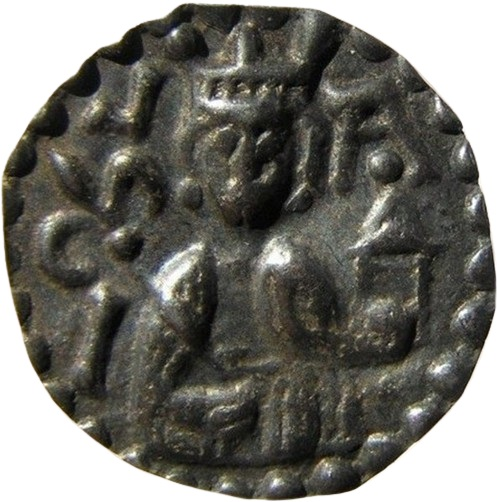
Coin of King Knut Eriksson

Knut Eriksson (Old Norse: Knútr Eiríksson; born before 1150 – died 1195/96), also known as Canute I, was King of Sweden from 1173 until his death (rival king since 1167). He was a son of King Erik the Saint and Queen Christina, who was a granddaughter of the Swedish king Inge the Elder.

== Youth and ascension ==
Knut was born no later than the 1140s, thus before his father had yet gained power over parts of Sweden. As a young man he was betrothed to a lady, sister of another Knut. Her name is not revealed, but her equal could supposedly not be found in the land. When Erik the Saint was killed in Uppsala in 1160, Knut was defeated and forced to flee, while his fiancée hid in a monastery for reasons of safety. According to late medieval sources he lived in exile in Norway for three years, a piece of information that is highly unreliable. He later returned to reclaim the throne. The killer of his father, Magnus Henriksen, was slain in 1161 by another pretender, Karl Sverkersson, who took the throne and resided in Näs Castle at the southern point of Visingsö, an island in Lake Vättern. Knut came over and slew Karl on 12 April 1167. The sources do not allow us to tell if it was a regicide or if Karl was killed in battle. The deed did not immediately secure the throne for Knut, who started fighting for power against Sverker the Elder's sons or grandsons Kol and Burislev. As the chronicle states, "he fought many battles against Sweden and had the victory in them all, and had great effort before he gained Sweden with peace." According to later sources Kol fell in fighting at Bjälbo in 1169, while Burislev underwent the same fate in about 1172–73. Only from this time could Knut call himself king of the whole country. According to the short chronicle included in the Västgöta Law, he ruled as a good king for 23 years after his victories.

== Rule ==
After 1174, Knut was ably supported in his rule by the jarl (earl) Birger Brosa who died in 1202. In many ways, the long reign of Knut brought Sweden closer to a Catholic-European state model. The power of the king was consolidated, concomitantly with an emerging central bureaucracy where the written word was increasingly important. The issuing of royal written documents began at this time; nine such are preserved, mostly dealing with the affairs of the monastery of Viby at Sigtuna. There had not been any coinage in Sweden from about 1030 to 1150, when minting once again started in Lödöse. King Knut supported the initiative and issued royal coins after c. 1180 with the inscription KANVTVS REX or KANVTVS. The coins are of German type, and minting may be connected to Knut's relationship with North Germany. Some time before 1180 he concluded a commercial treaty with Henry the Lion of Saxony. It is the first such treaty in Swedish history and may indicate the emergence of towns. He also sent three envoys to Henry II of England in c. 1185 and received pieces of armour in return.

== Relations with Scandinavian and Baltic neighbours ==
Within Scandinavia, Knut and his jarl Birger Brosa entertained good relations with the Norwegian king Sverre, who married the sister of the king, Margareta. The pretender Erling Steinvegg, who was the enemy of Sverre, was arrested by Knut on behalf of his brother-in-law and imprisoned on Visingsö. On the other hand, relations with Denmark were rocky. Danish rebels found refuge in Sweden in 1176 and 1191, and in 1182 Knut and Birger Brosa supported the pretender Harald Skraeng who fomented a rising in Skåne but was defeated by the Danish royal troops.

During his reign Knut was reportedly occupied fighting pagans for the sake of dissemination of the Christian faith. A fleet of pagan Karelians entered Lake Mälaren in 1187 and ravaged the coasts. The marauders burned Sigtuna and killed Archbishop Johannes at Almarestäket. It seems that Knut built a defensive tower on the island of Stockholm after this event, one of many such fortifications made necessary by heathen incursions from the Baltic lands. Other such towers were constructed in Skå, Stegeborg, Stenså, Kalmar, Strömsrum and Borgholm. Immediately after the attack, a sea-borne expedition to the east was organized. The chronicles of Novgorod report that Varyags and "Germans" from Gotland attacked its territory in 1188. The Nordic attackers won victories at Khoruzhka and Novotorzhek and stayed over winter. In the next spring they were defeated by the Novgorodians, however. Birger Brosa seems to have led another fleet of Germans and men from Gotland across the Baltic Sea in the 1190s - either before or after Knut's death. The expedition was aimed for Curland but was driven to the coast of eastern Estonia whose inhabitants were defeated and forced to pay tribute.

Skáldatal names two of King Knut's skalds: Hallbjörn hali and Þorsteinn Þorbjarnarson.

== Death and succession ==
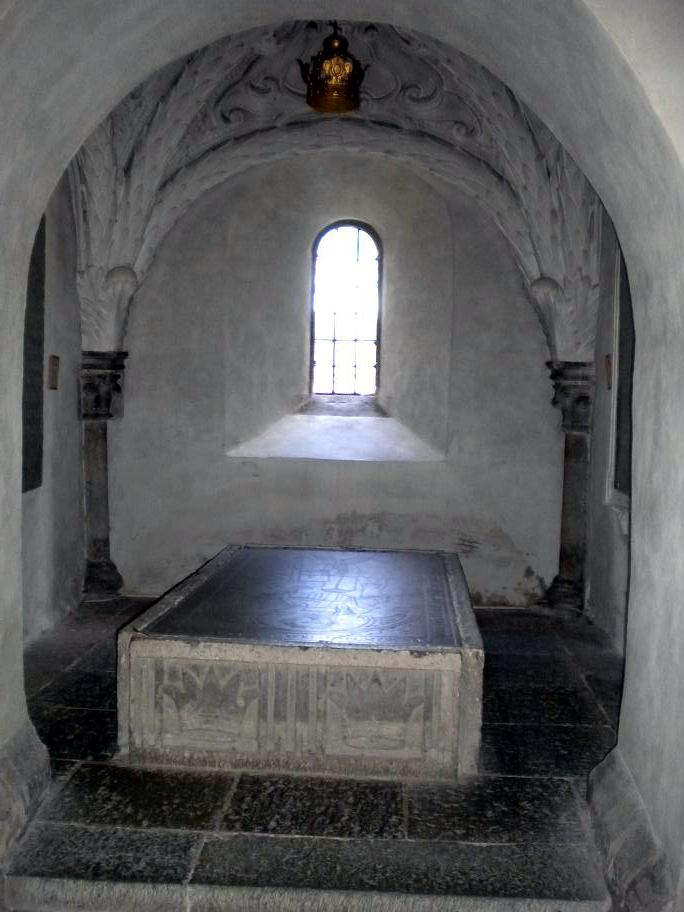
The tomb of Knut Eriksson in Varnhem Abbey

Knut Eriksson died in Eriksberg in Västergötland, either in the autumn of 1195 or on 8 April 1196. On balance he was the first successful ruler of Sweden for a long time, being the first king since Philip (d. 1118) to die a natural death. He was buried in Varnhem Abbey. His sons were reportedly grown up at his demise, but he was nevertheless succeeded by Sverker Karlsson, son of his former rival Karl Sverkersson. The House of Sverker had sufficient support among the church and grandees to regain power, apparently without shedding blood.

== Family ==
Knut married his cloistered fiancée after his ascension to power. The name of his wife is unknown but sometimes taken to be Cecilia Johansdotter. She gave birth to several children of which one was appointed heir to the throne with the consent of the grandees of the kingdom. At a later time she became seriously ill. In her agony she promised before God to observe celibacy if she recovered. Knut agreed in order to console her. In fact she survived and entered a monastery. However, Knut wrote a letter to Pope Celestine III in 1193, asking to be allowed to take up married life. The reason was that he must cooperate with his wife's relative to fight the pagans, and evade the libel of his enemies. The outcome of his request is not clear.

With his wife, Knut had four sons. Three were slain in November 1205 at Battle of Älgarås. The fourth was Erik Knutsson, who would defeat Sverker Karlsson and become King of Sweden in 1208.

They are said to have had a daughter, whose name was possibly Sigrid or Karin, and who is said to have married either jarl Knut Birgersson (and become mother of Magnus Broka), or married Magnus Broka himself (and with Magnus had a son Knut Magnusson, or, Knut Katarinason, claimant of Swedish throne and killed in 1251). Existence of this daughter is based on unclear mentions in old saga and chronicle material, especially the Norwegian Hákonar saga Hákonarsonar. It is to an extent accepted in research literature, to explicate Knut Magnusson's hereditary claim to the throne. This daughter was by necessity born in the 1170s or 1180s. She is also proposed by old romantical-looking genealogies as mother of a Duke's daughter Cecilia Knutsdotter (by necessity born near 1208 at earliest), whose parentage however is fully shrouded in mists of history.

== Literature ==
- Gillingstam, Hans. "Knut Eriksson", Svenskt biografiskt lexikon, https://sok.riksarkivet.se/Sbl/Presentation.aspx?id=11661
- Harrison, Dick, Sveriges historia 600-1350. Stockholm: Norstedts, 2009.
- Lagerqvist Lars O., Åberg Nils. Kings and Rulers of Sweden. Vincent Publications, 2002 (ISBN 91-87064-35-9).
- Larsson, Inger. Svenska medeltidsbrev; framväxten av ett offentligt skriftspråk. Stockholm: Norstedts (ISBN 91-1-301125-1).
- Larsson, Mats G., Götarnas riken; Upptäcktsfärder till Sveriges enande. Stockholm: Atlantis, 2002.
- Liljegren, Bengt. Rulers of Sweden. Historiska Media, 2004 (ISBN 91-85057-63-0).
- Line, Philip (2007). Kingship and State Formation in Sweden: 1130 - 1290. BRILL. ISBN 978-90-04-15578-7.
- Sundberg, Ulf, Medeltidens svenska krig. Stockholm: Hjalmarson & Högberg, 1999 (ISBN 91-89080-26-2).

Knut Eriksson House of Erik Died: 1196
Regnal titles
Preceded by Karl Sverkersson	King of Sweden; 1167–1196	Succeeded by Sverker Karlsson
