= 1529 in Sweden =

This article is a list of events, births and deaths that happened in the year 1529 in Sweden

== Incumbents ==
- Monarch – Gustav I

== Events ==
- The first Evangelical church meeting is held in Örebro, the Örebro koncilium: the customs of Holy water, Anointing and Pilgrimages (and thereby the worship of saints) is kept, and the priests are offered but not forced to accept the bible in the native language. However, fasting and the celibacy of vicars is abolished.
- Dissolution of Gudhem Abbey.
- April - The king sister Margareta Eriksdotter Vasa is captured and the Westrogothian rebellion takes place, with the purpose to deposed the king in protest of the Reformation.
- The former nuns of the Askeby Abbey are forcibly moved to Vreta Abbey.
- Wittenberg-trained churchman Olaus Petri developed the handbook of the Swedish Church called Een handbock påå Swensko

== Births ==
- - Laurentius Petri Gothus, the second Swedish Lutheran Archbishop of Uppsala (died 1579)
- - Ebba Månsdotter (Lilliehöök), countess and county administrator (died 1609)
- - Kerstin Gabrielsdotter, Swedish Noblewoman (died circa 1590)

== Deaths ==
- July 5 - Nils Olofsson, lawyer, councillor and knight (born c. 1460)
- July 5 - Måns Bryntesson, nobleman, knight, and councillor to the Swedish King, Gustav I (born 1493)
- Christin Custesdotter, burgher woman who was put on trial for adultery (born 1460)
- Erik Trolle, regent of Sweden (born c. 1460)
