= Vreta abductions =

Abductions of women in 13th c. Sweden

The three abductions of maidens from the Vreta convent was a series of events that took place in Sweden in the 13th century. They became legendary and inspired many poems.

== Background ==
The abduction of maidens for wives seems to have been an ancient Germanic tradition. Women's marriages were clan matters to be decided by the woman's nearest male relative, often together with tribal elders. A marriage was an alliance contract and also had many economical repercussions. A man was not allowed to marry a woman from an enemy clan unless it was to seal a treaty between the clans. On the other hand, a man might want to marry an heiress from a rival clan in order to impose his own power upon that clan.

== Abduction of 1210 ==
Around 1210, Helena Sverkersdotter, the only daughter of the deposed King Sverker II, was studying at the Vreta convent when her father fell in battle. The young Sune Folkason, son of an earl who had been among Sverker's opponents in that battle and had also fallen, wished to marry her, but her relatives would not hear his proposal. Folkason abducted Helena and, according to folklore, took her to the castle of Ymseborg. They married and had two daughters. The older was Catherine of Ymseborg, who married King Eric XI in 1244.

== Abduction of 1244 ==
Around 1244, Benedikte Sunadotter, the younger daughter of Sune Folkason and Helena Sverkersdotter, was being educated at the Vreta convent. Laurens Pedersson, Justiciar of Östergötland, abducted her. One theory is that Pedersson may have been a grandson of a king of the St. Eric dynasty and wished to unite that dynasty with Benedikte's Sverker dynasty. He may also have had designs on the throne. In any case, Benedikte was released and soon married high noble Svantepolk Knutsson, Lord of Viby, with whom she had several daughters and a son, Knut, who died childless.

== Abduction of 1288 ==
In 1288, Ingrid Svantepolksdotter, one of the daughters of Benedikte and Svantepolk, was being educated at the Vreta convent. Her father had intended her to marry a Danish nobleman, the future High Justiciar David Thorsteinsen. Folke Algotsson, a knight from Götaland (and, according to myth, a descendant of Algaut), abducted her with the help of some of his brothers and fled with her to Norway. King Magnus Ladulås, reportedly livid about the wilful breach of women's safety in convents, had one of the brothers executed.

Ingrid eventually returned from Norway and became abbess of Vreta. Her son, Knut Folkason, became Overlord of Blekinge and Lister.

== See also ==
- Liten Agda and Olof Tyste
