= Ingegerd Sverkersdotter =

Swedish princess and prioress

Ingegerd Sverkersdotter was a twelfth-century Swedish princess and the first prioress of Vreta Abbey. She was the daughter of King Sverker I of Sweden and his first wife, Ulvhild.

== History ==
The abbey was founded in Linköping in 1162 by Ingegerd's brother, King Charles VII of Sweden. Philip Line considers that Ingegerd "undoubtedly played an important role in the foundation of the nunnery" as part of the Swedish royal and noble drive towards monastic foundations at the time. An entry in the register of Linköping Cathedral records that Ingegerd "ruled it in an extraordinary way" for 40 years from soon after its foundation until her death in 1204. The Swedish Church History Association gives this account of her activities:

In the midst of all the unrest in the country, the abbess Ingegerd Sverkersdotter secured the monastery's financial position through her property policy. She was the planning and driving force in the new building works.

She presided over about thirty nuns following the Cistercian rule, including Queen Helena, presumably her sister, the widow of Canute V of Denmark.

Carl Ugglas suggested that a kneeling woman depicted in a painting in Kaga Church, Linköping might depict Ingegerd.
