= Svantepolk of Viby =

Swedish knight and councilor (1230–1310)

Svantepolk Knutsson (died 1310) was a Swedish knight and councilor. He became a wealthy feudal lord in Östergötland.

== Biography ==
His father was Knud Valdemarsen (c. 1205 – 1260), Duke of Revelia, Blekinge and Lolland. Svantepolk was the oldest son, but his sister Marianna of Blekinge (died 1252) was probably older, because Marianna's engagement in 1238 and wedding in 1241 require a chronology that she must be born in or before 1226. His father was a son of King Valdemar II of Denmark (1170–1241) born in the non-wedded (but probably engagement-promised) espousing with a widowed Swedish lady, Helena, daughter of Earl Guttorm. His mother was a Pomeranian whose first name is not known although often she is presented as Jadviga, same as Hedvig, but who is indicated to have come from a Vendish princely family, perhaps of Pomerelia. The name Svantepolk may have recalled some maternal relative of Slavic princely dynasties. His youngest brother was Eric, Duke of South Halland (died 1304). Svantepolk's younger sister is countess Lucia of Gleichen, the wife of Henry, Count of Gleichen, a Swedish and Danish aristocrat.

Svantepolk may have in 1230 inherited the Swedish properties of his grandmother Helena Guttormsdotter. This is because Svantepolk is much later documented as owner of the great domain of Strömsrum in Strand near Kalmar, a property that (with properties on Öland island) are presumed to have belonged to Helena and to her father the riksjarl Guttorm.

In 1241 Svantepolk got designated to inherit the Swedish landed properties of his grandfather King Valdemar II. Valdemar had inherited a vast landed fortune from his mother Sofie who as the sole surviving sibling of Burislev Sverkerson had inherited Burislev's personal property, located chiefly in Östergötland. Valdemar's heirs agreed that the troubles in preceding decades, caused by various Swedish regime's opposition towards the monarch of Denmark owning property inside borders of Sweden, is better to end totally. For this, making a clear separation, the young Svantepolk, son of illegitimate family branch, gets designated to be a Swede and to live as loyal subject/vassal of Sweden. Viby in Östergötland is probably the chief residence of that immense landed property.

Svantepolk settled at Viby in Östergötland in the late-13th century. He was a knight and councilor from about 1290. His manor was located in Östra Ryd, a parish near Söderköping. He became justiciar (lagman) of Östergötland for some years when in his seventies.

Svantepolk is the second husband (since c1250/1253) of Benedikta Sunadotter, lady of Söderköping et alii (floruit 1244-1261; died: years after 1261), daughter of Sune Folkason of 'Ympseborg fame' (d. 1247), a grandson of riksjarl Birger Brosa (d. 1202). Benedikta's mother was Helena Sverkersdotter, heiress of Visingsö et alii, the daughter of King Sverker II of Sweden and his (second) wife Benedicta Ebbesdotter of Hvide (d. ca. 1200). She was the sister of Queen Catherine Sunesdotter (c. 1215 – 1252), wife of King Eric XI of Sweden. As Benedikta Sunadotter had earlier been taken as tool for political opposition by her abductor Laurens Pederson (died in c1249 in exile in Norway), Benedikta's marriage with Svantepolk is presumably arranged by riksjarl Birger and king Eric's camp for neutralizing the possibility of using her as symbol to claim the Swedish throne in name of Sverker-dynasty heritage. Svantepolk appears as a politically neutral and no-claimant figure, much like his father-in-law Sune Folkason had been - and thus king Eric the rightful guardian of the female, Benedikta, gives her in marriage to Svantepolk.

In 1259 Svantepolk's niece Anastasia (b. 1245 – d. 15 March 1317) married Henry I the Pilgrim, Lord of Mecklenburg. In the 1260s, Svantepolk's much younger sister Lucia married Count of Gleichen. In the 1280s, the 'gener' Gleichen joined Svantepolk in service of Sweden.

Svantepolk Knutsson was the father of Ingrid Svantepolksdotter (d. ca.1350), wife of Folke Algotsson (d. ca. 1310) and later abbess of Vreta Abbey. They were the parents of Swedish councilor Knut Folkesson (d. 1348).

Svantepolk and Benedicta's daughters married lords of Swedish high nobility and became ancestresses of several Swedish noble families, bringing substantial dowries.
