= Helen of Sweden =

Helen of Sweden - Swedish: Helena or Elin - may refer to:

- Helena (wife of Inge the Elder), Queen consort of Sweden around 1079
- Helena Pedersdatter Strange, Queen consort of Sweden 1229
- Helena of Sweden, Princess of Sweden (name not certain), 12th century Queen of Denmark
- Helen, Princess of Sweden about 1190
