= Gudhem Abbey =

Monastery ruins in Västergötland, Sweden

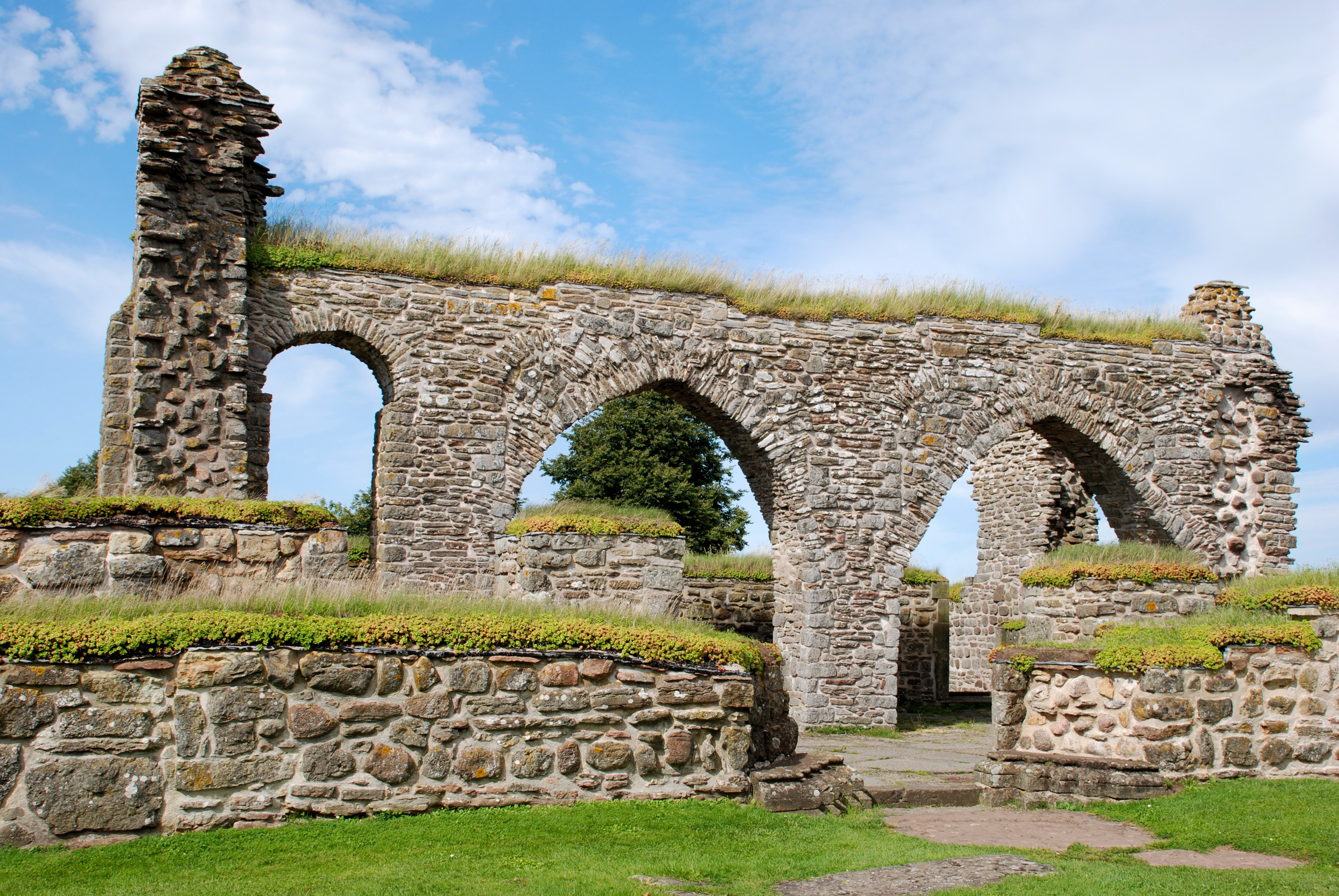
- Ruins of the monastery.

- Location within Västra Götaland

Monastery information
- Order: Order of Saint Benedict and Cistercians
- Established: 1152
- Disestablished: 1527

Site
- Location: Gudhem, Västra Götaland County, Sweden
- Coordinates: 58°14′24″N 13°33′17″E

Gudhem Abbey (Swedish: Gudhems kloster) is the ruin of a nunnery which was in operation from 1152 to 1529. It is located in Gudhem outside Falköping in the Falbygden area in Västergötland, Sweden. It was initially part of the Benedictine and later Cistercian order. It is considered to have been one of the oldest convents in Sweden; after Vreta Abbey (1100) and Alvastra Abbey (1143).

== History ==
Gudhem, a name signifying "Home of the Gods", was according to tradition a holy place of worship already before Christianity. According to the saga, one hundred images of the thunder god Thor were placed in Gudhem. According to a popular legend, Gudhem Abbey was founded in 1052 by Gunnhildr Sveinsdóttir, Queen Dowager of Sweden and Denmark, who returned to a life of penitence in her estate in Västergötland in Sweden, after her marriage with king Svein II of Denmark was annulled by the Church. In reality, however, the Abbey was founded exactly one hundred years later, in 1152. Charles VII of Sweden donated the royal estate of Gudhem Manor to the Abbey during his reign (1161–1167), and the nunnery was by then described as newly established.

Gudhem Abbey was prestigious during the 13th century, when it was responsible for providing the Pilgrims on their way to Nidaros with hospitality. Catherine of Ymseborg (c. 1215 – 1252) was Queen consort of Sweden from 1244 to 1250 as the wife of King Eric XI of Sweden. In her later years, she served as abbess of Gudhem Abbey and donated her vast estates to it.

=== Dissolution ===
During the Swedish Reformation in 1527, the abbey was confiscated by the crown in accordance with the Reduction of Gustav I of Sweden, in the following year it was granted to the nobleman Nils Olofsson. The former nuns however, were granted an allowance from the properties formerly belonging to the abbey and the right to live in the building for life. In 1529, the abbey caught fire and burned down. The last abbess asked the King to rebuild the abbey, but her request was not granted, and the nuns were housed by the surrounding peasantry. They continued to be supported by the allowance granted to them in 1527. There were still former nuns benefiting from the allowance living in the surroundings of the former abbey in 1540. The abbey was never rebuilt and the ruins were used as a quarry. The ruins were excavated in 1928–1969.

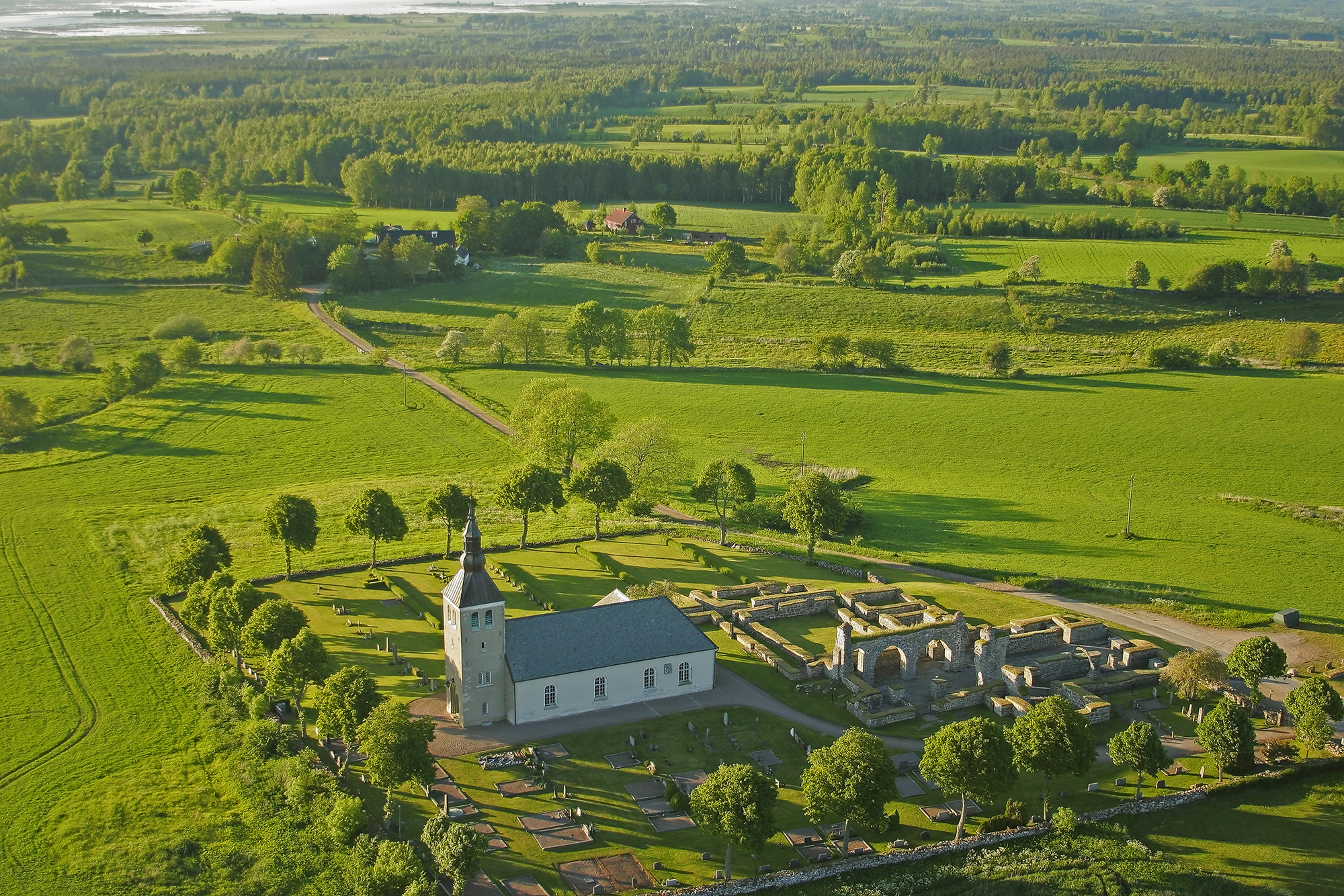
Aerial view of Gudhem Church and ruins of Gudhem Abbey

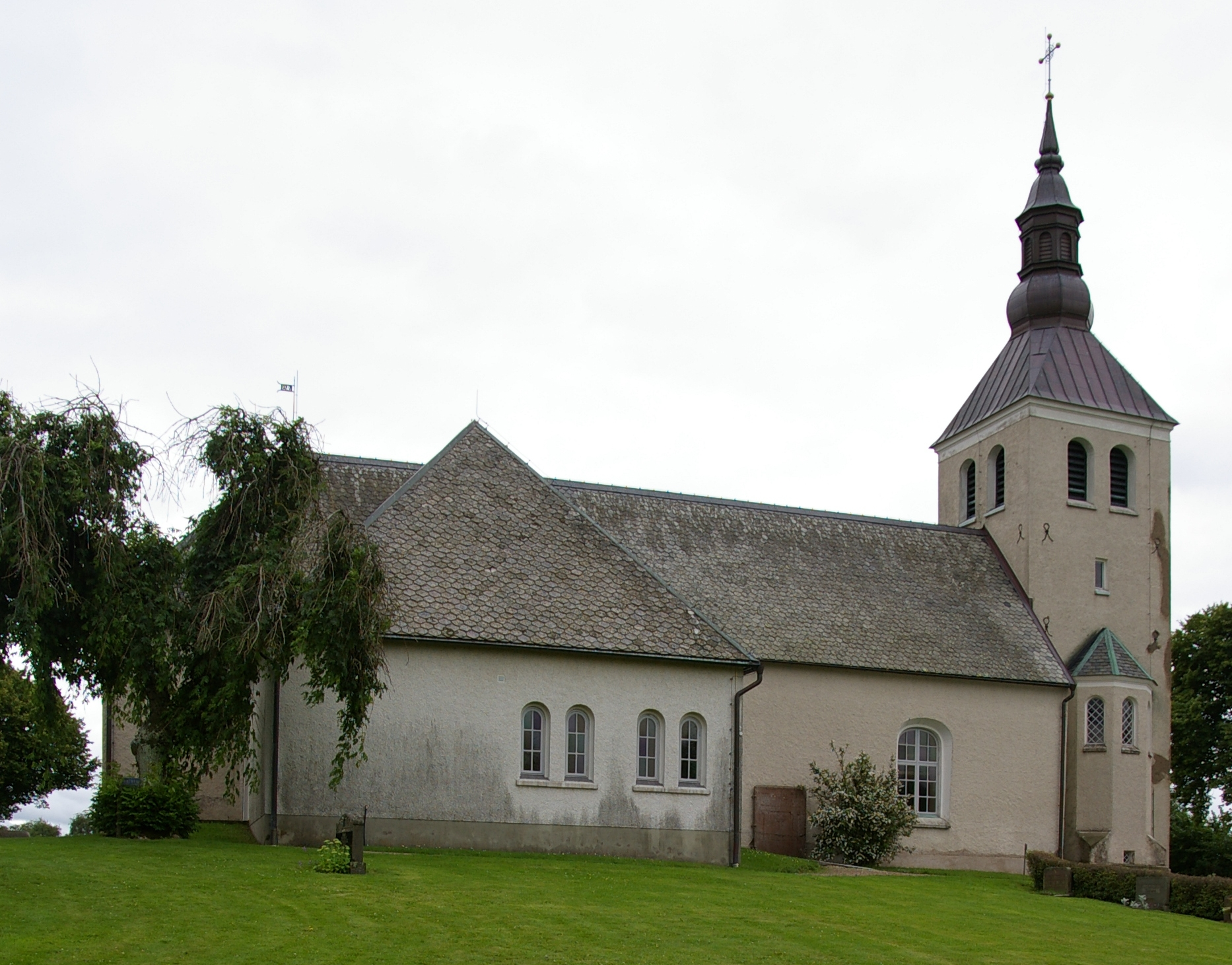
Gudhem Church

== Gudhem Church ==
Gudhem Church (Gudhems kyrka) is one of four churches that are part of the parish of Gudhem in the Diocese of Skara. Gudham Church was originally built sometime between 1160 and 1200 after the founding of Gudhem Abbey. The church was in its original condition until the 1560s, when it was looted and burned. The tower chamber was converted into a sacristy in 1703. The church was extended to the east 1811–1815. The present tower was built during an extensive restoration in 1900.

The church was restored in the years 1897-1900 and the interior was restored in 1951–1952. It was remodeled and a new sacristy was added in 1979. During the most recent restoration in 1999–2000, the barrel vault was removed. The altar was lowered and the interior of the church was painted in warm colors. Part of the decorative painting in its original patterns and colors was produced.

== Abbesses ==
The abbesses are only partially known.

- Katarina Folkesdotter (1250–1271)
- Karin Mattesdotter (1290)
- Gyrid Pedersdotter (1294)
- Ing (-eborg) Mattesdotter Oxenstierna, died after 1344, (1311–1323)
- Christina Laurensdotter (1330)
- Kaarin (1374)
- Elina Hindriksdotter (1379)
- Christina Andreasdotter (1392)
- Karin Håkonadotter (1399–1418)
- Ingrid Philippussadotter (1424–1430)
- Margareta (1433–1442)
- Margareta Asmundsdotter (1444)
- Christina Bengstdotter (1455–1461)
- Christina Bengstdotter (1465)
- Catharina Pedersdotter (1478)
- Ingeborg Jönsdotter (1487)
- Karin Andersdotter (1490–1497)
- Karin Hansadotter (1500)
- Ingerid Jönsdotter (1513)

== Gallery ==
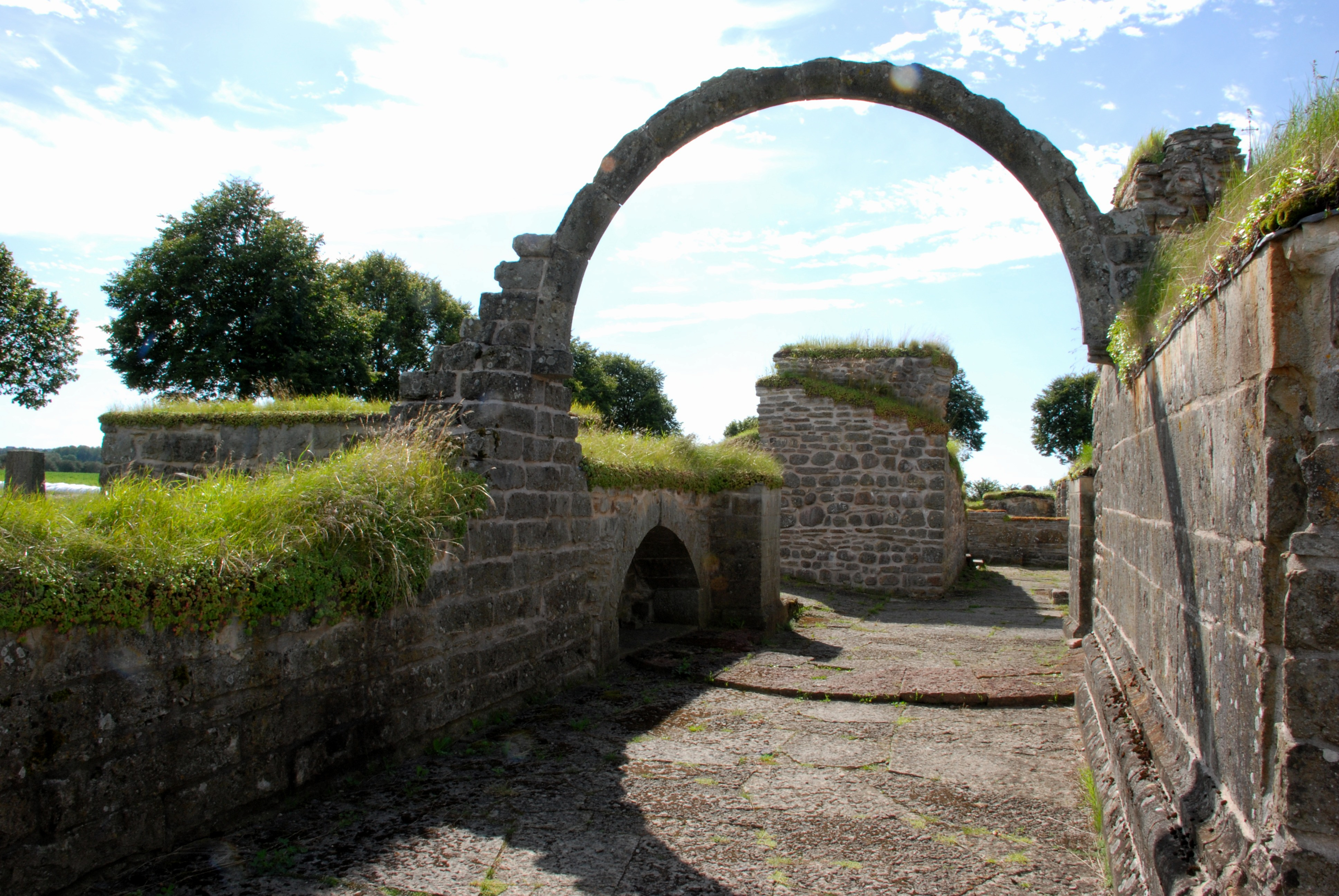
Ruins of the monastery

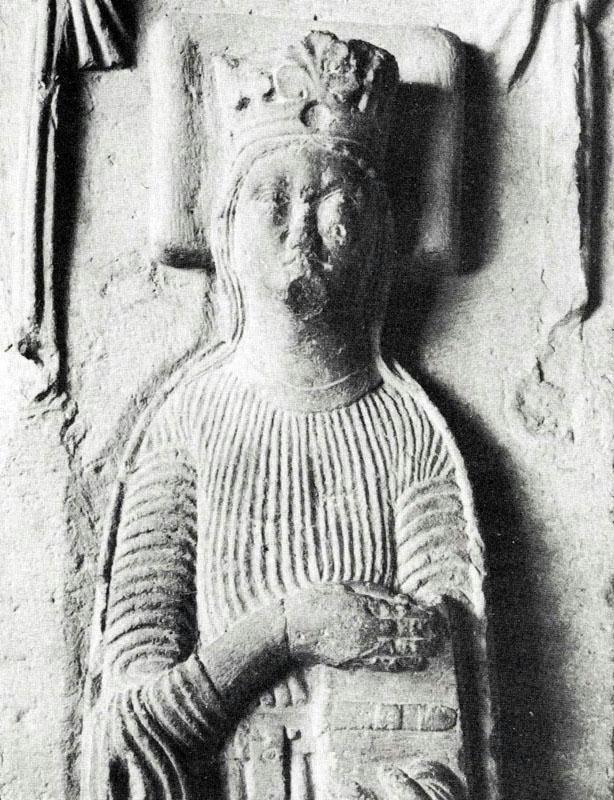
Tomb of Queen Catherine of Ymseborg

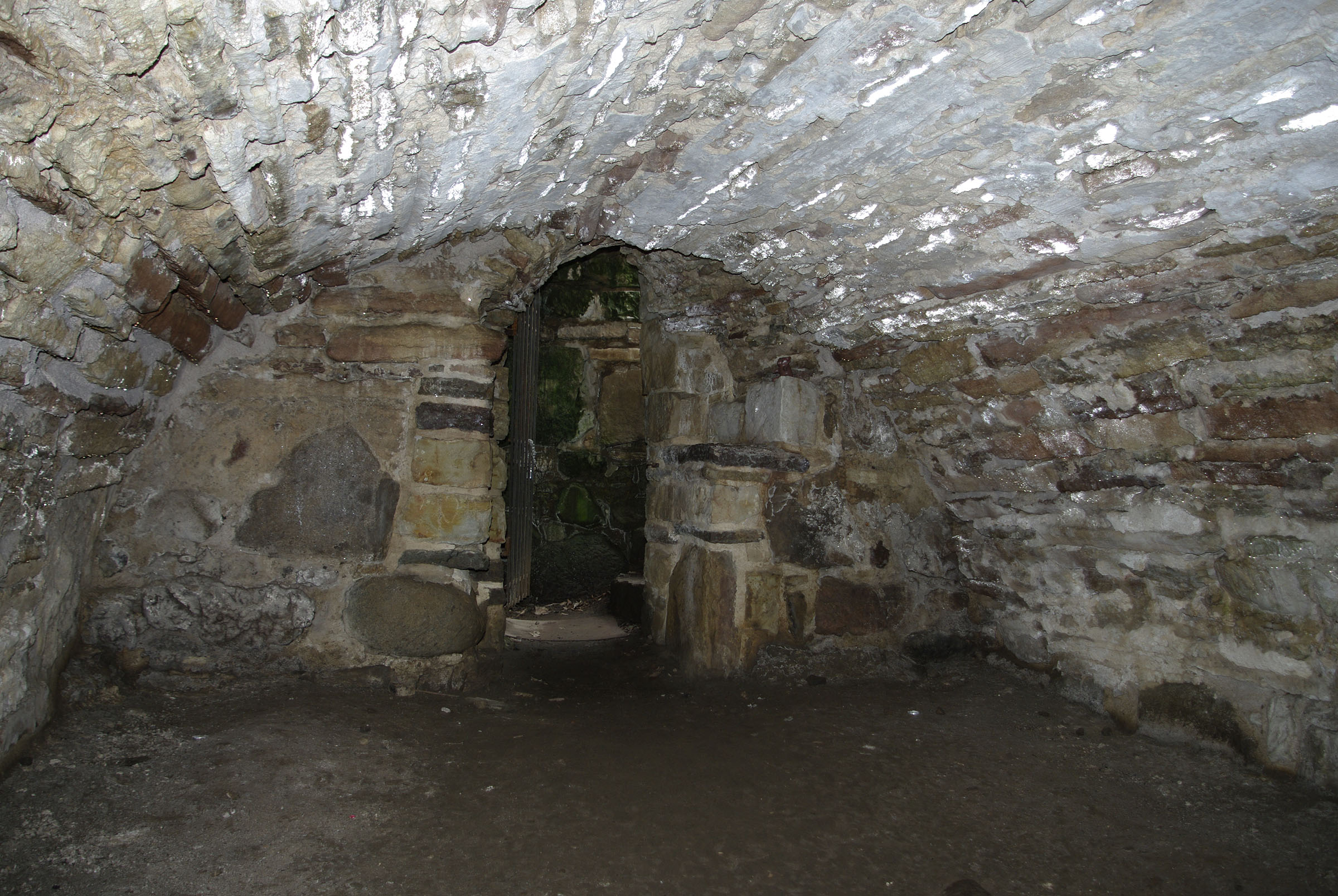
Cellar to the monastery.

== Other Sources ==
- Famil-Journalen. Band 15. Årgång 1876
