= Ingrid Svantepolksdotter =

Swedish abbess (fl. 1350)

Ingrid Svantepolksdotter (floruit 1350) was a Swedish noblewoman and abbess of Vreta Abbey, serving from 1323 to 1344. She is also known as the central figure in one of the incidents known as the Maiden Abduction from Vreta, in which she was abducted from the abbey by the man she later married.

Ingrid was the daughter of Svantepolk of Viby and Benedicta of Bjelbo, and was therefore a niece of Queen Catherine of Sweden. She was engaged to the Danish noble David Torstensson, but was placed at Vreta Abbey as a child to be educated before her marriage. Her sister Catherine was also placed at the abbey, although in her case with the intention of joining the religious order.

In 1287, Ingrid was abducted from Vreta Abbey by the Norwegian jarl Folke Algotsson, in the third of the well-known incidents referred to as the Maiden Abduction from Vreta; the two earlier abductions had involved her mother and maternal grandmother. Folke took Ingrid to Norway, where they married and had a son, Knut Folkesson. After Folke's death in 1310, Ingrid returned to Sweden.

By March 1322, Ingrid had become a member of Vreta Abbey, and in 1323 she succeeded her sister as abbess. She resigned from the position in 1344, but is last mentioned in 1350, when she temporarily served as abbess following the death of the previous abbess and before the election of a new one.

== Sources ==
- Agneta Conradi Mattsson: Riseberga kloster, Birger Brosa & Filipssönerna, Vetenskapliga skrifter utgivna av Örebro läns museum 2, 1998, ISBN 91-85642-24-X
- Dick Harrison: Jarlens sekel - En berättelse om 1200-talets Sverige, Ordfront, Stockholm, 2002, ISBN 91-7324-999-8
- Kristin Parikh: Kvinnoklostren på Östgötaslätten under medeltiden. Asketiskt ideal - politisk realitet, Lund University Press, Lund, 1991
- "Vreta kloster: Klosterpersonalen". sv.wikisource.org.
