= Askeby Abbey =

Cistercian nunnery (late 12th century - 1529)

Coordinates: 58.4089°N 15.8569°E

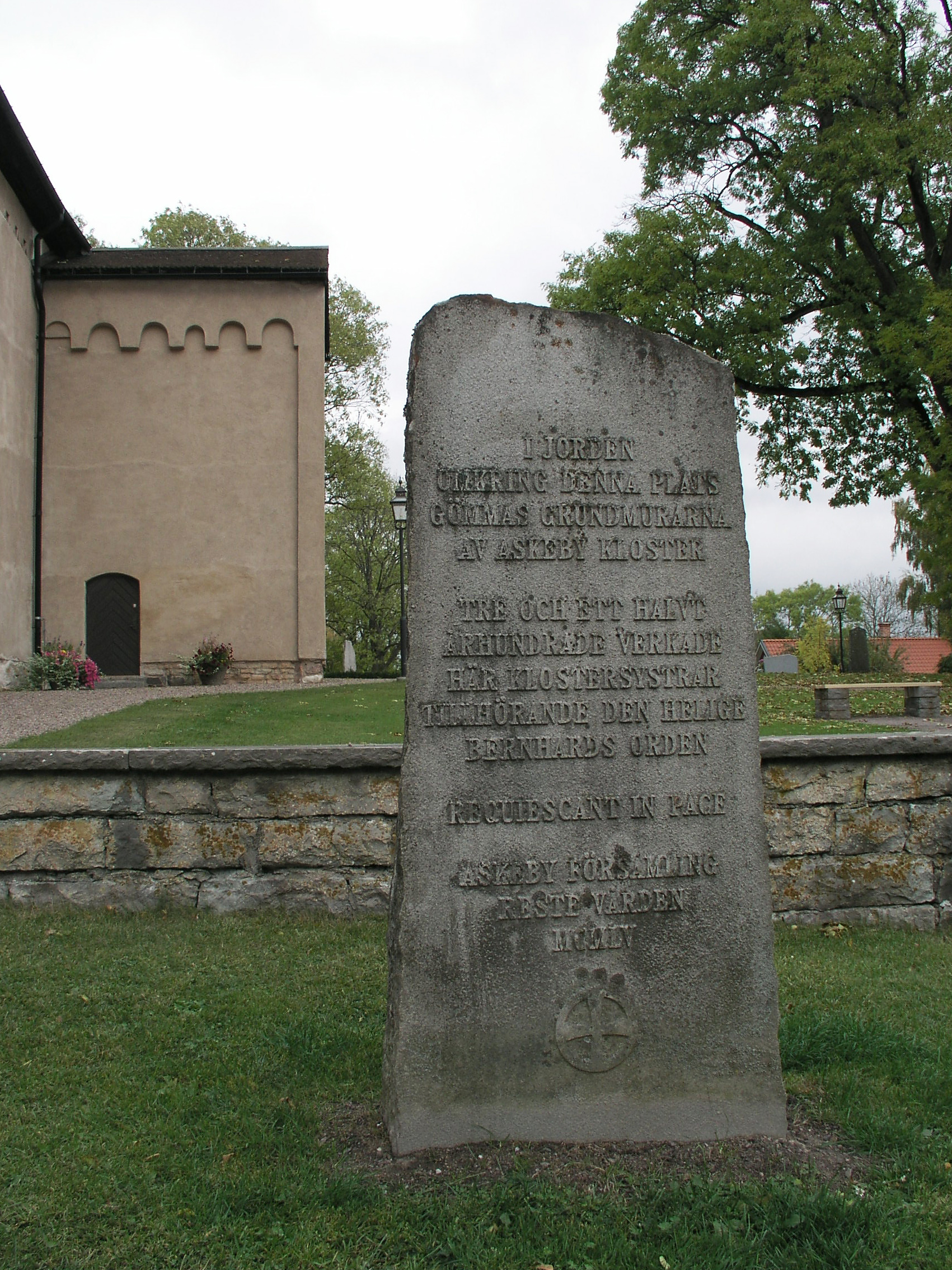
Askeby Abbey memorial stone

Askeby Abbey (Swedish: Askeby kloster) was a Cistercian nunnery in operation from the late 12th century until 1529. It was located in Askeby outside Linköping, Sweden.

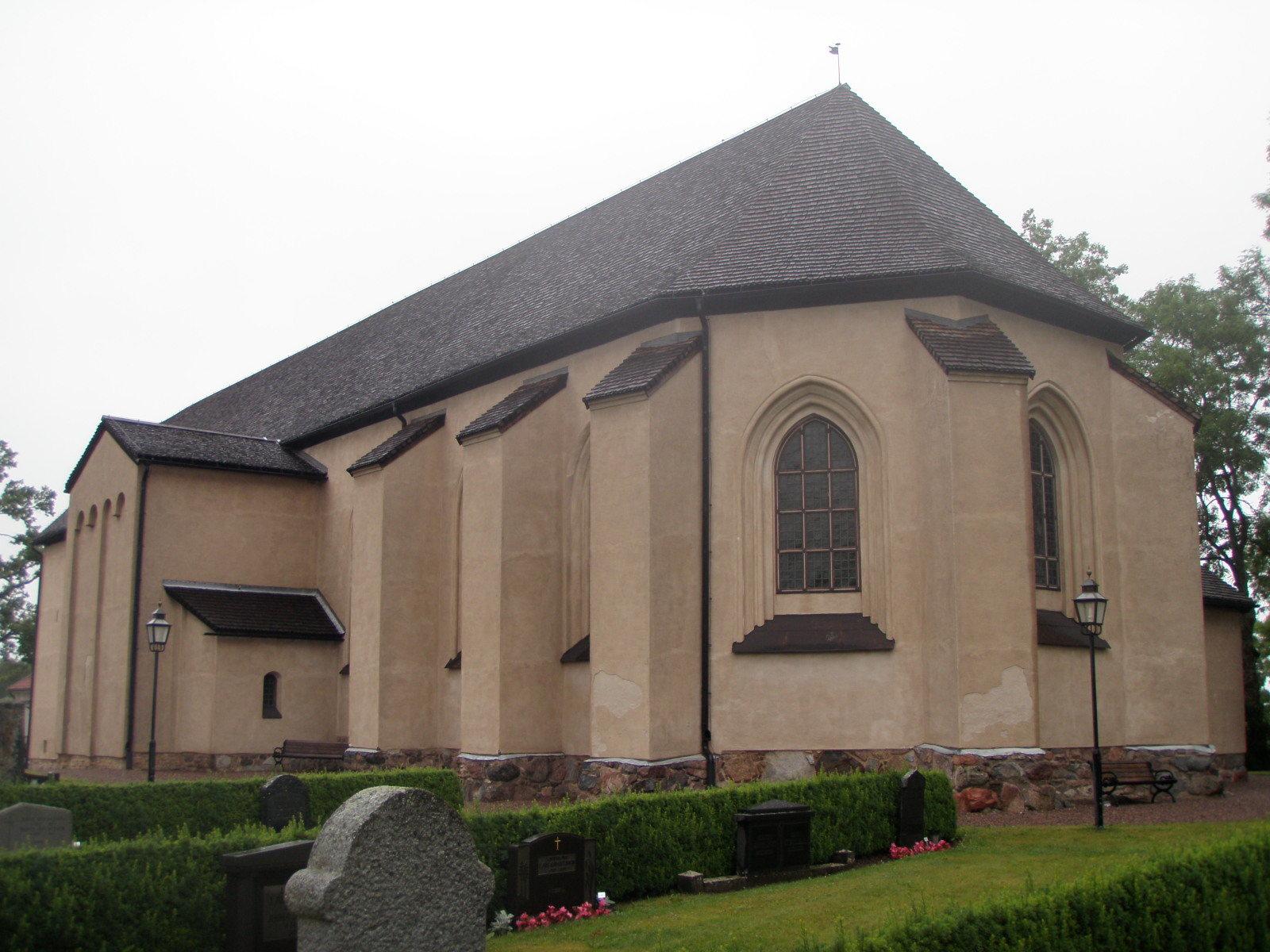
Askeby Church

== History ==
Askeby Abbey was founded as a daughter convent of the Vreta Abbey during the second half of the 12th century. It was placed under the authority of the Alvastra Abbey: no member of the abbey was allowed to go outside the walls without a permit from the Abbot of Alvastra, not even the abbess herself, though she could receive guests in the abbey.

Askeby Abbey did not belong to the largest of the Swedish nunneries, but it was wealthy and of some importance and often benefited by important people. Placed by the important road to Söderköping, it functioned as an inn for travelers. The abbey had the income from one third of the crown taxed fishing in Norrköping. The abbess of the abbey also had the right to appoint the priest of Sankt Olai kyrka at Norrköping in Östergötland which often caused conflicts with that city. In 1462, the Abbess Anna Jacobi and the nuns were given an official thanks from the Pope after their assistance to his envoy Martinus de Fregano, who had visited Sweden to gather funds for a crusade against the Ottoman Turks.

In the late 15th century the discipline was lax; the abbess received guests in her personal chambers, and in 1490 the nuns were threatened with interdict for socializing with the outside world. After the Swedish Reformation of 1527, the valuables of the abbey were confiscated and taken to the royal treasury in accordance with the Reduction of Gustav I of Sweden, and the management of the abbey was given to the abbess of Vreta Abbey. In 1529, all remaining members of the abbey were relocated to Vreta Abbey and Askeby Abbey was thereby dissolved. The buildings burnt down eight years later. The remains of the abbey are gone.

== Askeby Church ==
Askeby Church (Swedish: Askeby kyrka) was built together with a nunnery during the second half of the 12th century and was used until about 1530 by both the parish and the abbey. The sacristy was probably built in the late 15th or early 16th century. In 1609 the church burned down and the tower was almost completely destroyed. Only two floors of the original tower remain. The western part of the nave underwent major rebuilding 1876-1877. The tower rooms regained their medieval character in 1913. In 1951, the interior was restored, the exterior in 1970. Today the church serves the parish of Askeby in the Diocese of Linköping. During 1955, a memorial stone was erected on site to the memory of Askeby Abbey.

== Abbesses ==
(partial listing)

- Margareta Lawransdotter (1349)
- Bothild Petersdotter 1350-1356)
- Ingrid Ingemarsdotter
- Märta or Märita (Margareta) Haraldsdotter (1383-1413)
- Kristina Magnusdotter
- Anna Jacobsdotter (1450)
- Ramborg Thordsdotter (1486-1489)
- Sigrid Birgersdotter (1492-1501)
- Karin Nilsdotter (1507)
- Margareta (1512-1515)
- Bothild Petersdotter (1515-1529)

== Other sources ==
- Kjell O. Lejon (2008) Askeby kloster Om klostertid och klosterliv (Artos Norma bokförlag) ISBN 9789175803630
