= Ingrid Persdotter =

Fictitious Swedish nun

Ingrid Persdotter (died 28 March 1524) is a fictitious Swedish nun at the convent of Saint Birgitta in Vadstena, who supposedly wrote a passionate love letter to a knight named Axel Nilsson in 1498.

== See also ==
- Liten Agda and Olof Tyste

== Bibliography ==
Magnus von Platen, En bedragare och hans verk. In: Ders., Biktare och bedragare, Stockholm 1959, S. 63–99.
