= Sverker the Younger =

King of Sweden from 1195 to 1208

- Coin of King Sverker, c. 1200

King of Sweden
- Reign: 1195–1208
- Predecessor: Knut Eriksson
- Successor: Erik Knutsson
- Born: before 1167
- Died: 17 July 1210; Battle of Gestilren
- Spouses: Benedicta Ebbesdatter; Ingegerd Birgersdotter
- Issue: Helena Sverkersdotter; Johan Sverkersson
- House: Sverker
- Father: Karl Sverkersson
- Mother: Christina Hvide

Sverker the Younger (Note: Swedish: Sverker den yngre) (before 1167 – 17 July 1210), also known as Sverker II or Sverker Karlsson, was King of Sweden from 1195 or 1196 to 1208 when he was defeated in the Battle of Lena by Erik Knutsson. Sverker died in the 1210 Battle of Gestilren where his forces battled those of King Erik Knutsson.

== Early life ==
Sverker was a son of King Karl Sverkersson of Sweden and Queen Christina Hvide, a Danish noblewoman. Through his mother, he was a first cousin once removed of the Danish kings Canute VI and Valdemar Sejr. His parents' marriage has been dated to 1162 or more probably 1163.

When his father Karl had been murdered in Visingsö in 1167, apparently by minions of the next king Knut Eriksson, Sverker was taken to Denmark while a boy and grew up with his mother's clan of Hvide, leaders of Zealand. Sverker also allied himself with the Galen clan leaders in Skåne who were close to the Hvide, by marriage through lady Benedicta Ebbesdatter. The Danish king supported him as claimant to Sweden, thus helping to destabilize the neighboring country. The troubled Danish-Swedish relations at this time can be seen from attempts by Knut Eriksson and his jarl Birger Brosa to support rebels against Valdemar I and Canute VI.

When King Knut Eriksson died in 1195 or 1196, his sons were young but not children. One of them had been appointed heir to the throne, but was passed over. Sverker was chosen as the next king of Sweden, surprisingly without quarrel. At some point he had returned to his native country, however being regarded quite Danish. His uncontested election probably owed much to Jarl Birger Brosa whose daughter, Ingegerd, Sverker married soon after his first wife had died. In his own letters he emphasized his birth-right to kingship: "son of King Karl, King of the Swedes, possessor of the throne of the same kingdom according to hereditary right by the grace of God".

== Reign ==
King Sverker confirmed and enlarged privileges for the Swedish church and Valerius, the Archbishop of Uppsala. The privilege document of 1200 is the oldest known ecclesiastical privilege in Sweden. Skáldatal names two of Sverker's court skalds: Sumarliði skáld and Þorgeirr Danaskáld. In 1202 Earl Birger died and the late jarl's grandson, Sverker's one-year-old son John received the title of Jarl from his father. This was intended to strengthen him as heir of the crown, but led to much ridicule.

Desultory warfare with the peoples east of the Baltic Sea continued during Sverker's reign. Birger Brosa undertook a sea-borne expedition that ended up in Wierland in eastern Estonia, either before or after Sverker's accession. A certain Dux John (Johannes) flourished in the early 13th century; according his grave inscription, he was the "terror of the pagans". He may be identified with a Jon Jarl who, according to later tradition, fought the Russians and Ingrians for nine years, but was killed at Askanäs by Lake Mälaren by Karelian pirates, immediately after his return. His widow supposedly gathered levies which killed the marauders at Estaskär. It has been suggested that this took place in 1206. In general, Estonian and Curonian raiders constituted a problem for the coasts of Sweden and Denmark in this era.

== Civil war ==
Around 1203, Knut's four sons, who had lived in Swedish royal court, began to claim the throne and Sverker exiled them to Norway. His position as king became insecure from this point forward. The sons of Knut returned with troops in 1205, supported by the Norwegian party of Birkebeiner. Sverker, however, attacked and defeated them in the Battle of Älgarås in Tiveden, where three of the sons fell. The only survivor, Erik, returned with Norwegian support in 1208. Sverker sought assistance from his Danish kinsmen, and such was provided. Popular tradition speaks of 12,000 Danish auxiliary troops, which is likely a gross exaggeration. The forces were commanded by Ebbe Sunesen, the father of his late first wife and brother of Andreas Sunesen, Archbishop of Lund. Apart from the forces of the Sunesen brothers, King Valdemar Sejr contributed with troops, even including Bohemian soldiers. The opponents met in the Battle of Lena in Västergötland, where Sverker was heavily defeated. Ebbe and his brother Lars were slain by the enemy together with a considerable part of their army. Sverker's jarl Knut seems to have been killed as well. King Erik Knutsson drove Sverker to exile to Denmark.

== Death ==
Pope Innocentius III's attempt to have the crown returned to Sverker did not succeed. Sverker made a new military expedition, with Danish support, to Sweden, but was defeated and killed in the Battle of Gestilren in July 1210. The ancient sources state that "the Folkung [party] took his life". Responsible for the killing was his brother-in-law Folke Jarl, head of the Folkungs, who also succumbed in the battle. The site of the battle has engendered some discussion; while it is usually taken to have taken place in the parish of Varv in Västergötland, Gästre in Uppland has also been suggested.

In spite of his hapless fate, Sverker II receives several kind words in the short chronicle included in the Västgöta Law: "The sixteenth [ruler] was King Sverker, a wise and good fellow; the kingdom fared well from him. But the Folkungs took his life; his own brother-in-law did that to him at Gestilren. He rests in Alvastra, and the best things are always spoken about him".

== Family ==
With his first wife, the Danish noble Benedicta Ebbesdatter (Galen branch of the Hvide family), b. c. 1165/70, d. 1200), whom he married before 1190 when yet living in Denmark, Sverker had at least one well-attested daughter, Helena. There were possibly further children, such as Karl Sverkersson who according to Norwegian sources married a daughter of king Sverre of Norway and lost his life in 1198; his position is however doubtful, and if he was King Sverker's son he died in adolescence at the latest. There were possibly even two other daughters, Margaret and Christina, married to Witzlav of Rügen and Henry II, Lord of Mecklenburg ("Henry Borwin" in some later texts), respectively. The genealogical reconstruction is based on vague contemporary statements – however, Margaret and Christina may just have been Sverker's first wife's kinswomen.

The second marriage in 1200 with Ingegerd, daughter of the Folkunge Jarl Birger Brosa, produced a son and heir, Johan (1201–1222), who was chosen king of Sweden 1216.

It has also been argued however that it is possible Ingegerd was in fact Sverker's first wife, and Benedicta his second, and that possibly more of the evidence may point to this conclusion instead.

His attested daughter Helena Sverkersdotter married (earl) Sune Folkesson of the family of Bjälbo, justiciar of Västergötland. Their daughters Catherine and Benedicta became pawns in marriages to gain Swedish succession after 1222, when the Sverker dynasty became extinct in male line. Catherine was married to the rival dynasty's heir King Erik Eriksson but they remained apparently childless. Benedicta married Svantepolk of Viby and had several daughters, who married Swedish noblemen. Several Swedish noble families claim descent from Benedicta.

King Gustav Vasa was a descendant of Sverker through his granddaughter Benedicta Sunesdotter.

== Literature ==
- Gillingstam, Hans (1964–1966). "Folkungaätten". Svenskt biografiskt lexikon (in Swedish). Vol. 16. National Archives of Sweden. p. 260.
- Gillingstam, Hans (1973–1975). "Jon jarl". Svenskt biografiskt lexikon (in Swedish). Vol. 20. National Archives of Sweden. p. 360.
- Gillingstam, Hans (1973–1975). "Karl Sverkersson". Svenskt biografiskt lexikon (in Swedish). Vol. 20. National Archives of Sweden. p. 621.
- Gillingstam, Hans (1975–1977). "Knut Eriksson". Svenskt biografiskt lexikon (in Swedish). Vol. 21. National Archives of Sweden. p. 383.
- Gillingstam, Hans (1982). "Utomnordiskt och nordiskt i de äldsta svenska dynastiska förbindelserna". Personhistorisk Tidskrift. 1981 (77). Krylbo : Personhistoriska samfundet, 1900-: 17–28. ISSN 0031-5699. SELIBR 2373654., häfte 1, 1981
- Harrison, Dick, Sveriges historia; medeltiden. Stockholm: Liber, 2002.
- Lönnroth, Erik, Från svensk medeltid. Stockholm: Aldus, 1959.
- Munch, P.A., Det norske Folks Historie, Vol. III. Christiania: Chr. Tönsbergs Forlag, 1857.
- Sandblom, Sven, Gestilren 1210. Striden stod i Uppland! I Gästre!. Enköping: Enköpings kommun, 2004.
- Sundberg, Ulf, Medeltidens svenska krig. Stockholm: Hjalmarson & Högberg, 1999.

Sverker the Younger House of Sverker Born: c. 1164 Died: 17 July 1210
Regnal titles
Preceded by Knut Eriksson	King of Sweden; 1195/1196–1208	Succeeded by Erik Knutsson
