= Benedicta of Bjälbo =

Swedish noblewoman (d. 1261)

Benedicta of Bjälbo (Swedish: Bengta Sunesdotter; died 1261) was a Swedish noblewoman and a central figure in the incident known as the Maiden Abduction from Vreta. Like her mother, Helen of Sweden, before her and her daughter, Ingrid Svantepolksdotter, after her, Benedicta was abducted from Vreta Abbey by the man she later married. Her abduction became the subject of the folk song Junker Lars klosterrov ("Bridal Abduction of Young Lars").

== Biography ==
Benedicta was the daughter of Helen of Sweden and Sune Folkesson, and the sister of Catherine Sunesdotter, queen consort of Sweden. She was placed at Vreta Abbey for her education.

In 1244, Benedicta was abducted by Lars Petersson, Justiciar of Östergötland, who took her to Norway. One theory holds that Lars was a descendant of the House of Eric and sought through Benedicta to unite his dynasty with the House of Sverker. He may also have had ambitions for the Swedish throne. Benedicta remained with Lars in Norway for several years. After his death, she returned to Sweden.

She later married the nobleman Svantepolk Knutsson, with whom she had several children, including Ingrid Svantepolksdotter and a son, Knut, who died without issue.

== Sources ==
- Conradi Mattsson, Agneta (1998). Riseberga kloster, Birger Brosa & Filipssönerna (in Swedish). Örebro läns museum. ISBN 91-85642-24-X.
- Harrison, Dick (2002). Jarlens sekel: En berättelse om 1200-talets Sverige (in Swedish). Stockholm: Ordfront. ISBN 91-7324-999-8.
