= 1609 in Sweden =

Events from the year 1609 in Sweden

== Incumbents ==
- Monarch – Charles IX

== Events ==
- - Battle of Kamenka.
- - Battle of Torzhok.
- - First Battle of Tver.
- - Second Battle of Tver.
- - Battle of Kaljazin.
- - Battle of Troitsko.
- - Charles XI is partially paralyzed by a stroke.

== Deaths ==
- 29 September - Ebba Månsdotter (Lilliehöök), notorious countess and country administrator (born 1529)
- 25 March - Olaus Martini, archbishop (born 1557)
