= 1557 in Sweden =

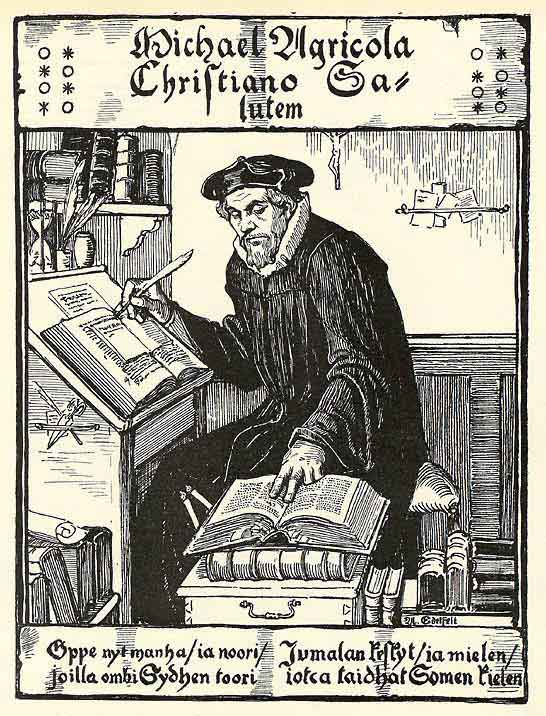
Mikael Agricola by Albert Edelfelt

This article is about events from the year 1557 in Sweden

== Incumbents ==
- Monarch – Gustav I

== Events ==
- 2 April - Treaty of Novgorod (1557)
- - The Duchy of Prince John is expanded.
- 7 September - Duke Magnus is granted a Duchy.
- - Crown Prince Eric is granted Kalmar as a fief and is installed there as governor.
- - Gustav Vasa writes his testimony. The son Magnus receives parts of Götalandskapen, Närke, Småland and all of Dalsland as a hereditary duchy.

== Births ==
- Date unknown - Olaus Martini, archbishop (died 1609)

== Deaths ==
- 1 August - Olaus Magnus, writer and ecclesiastic (born 1490)
- 1 April - Mikael Agricola, Protestant reformer of Finland (born 1510)
