= Battle of Gestilren =

1210 battle in Sweden

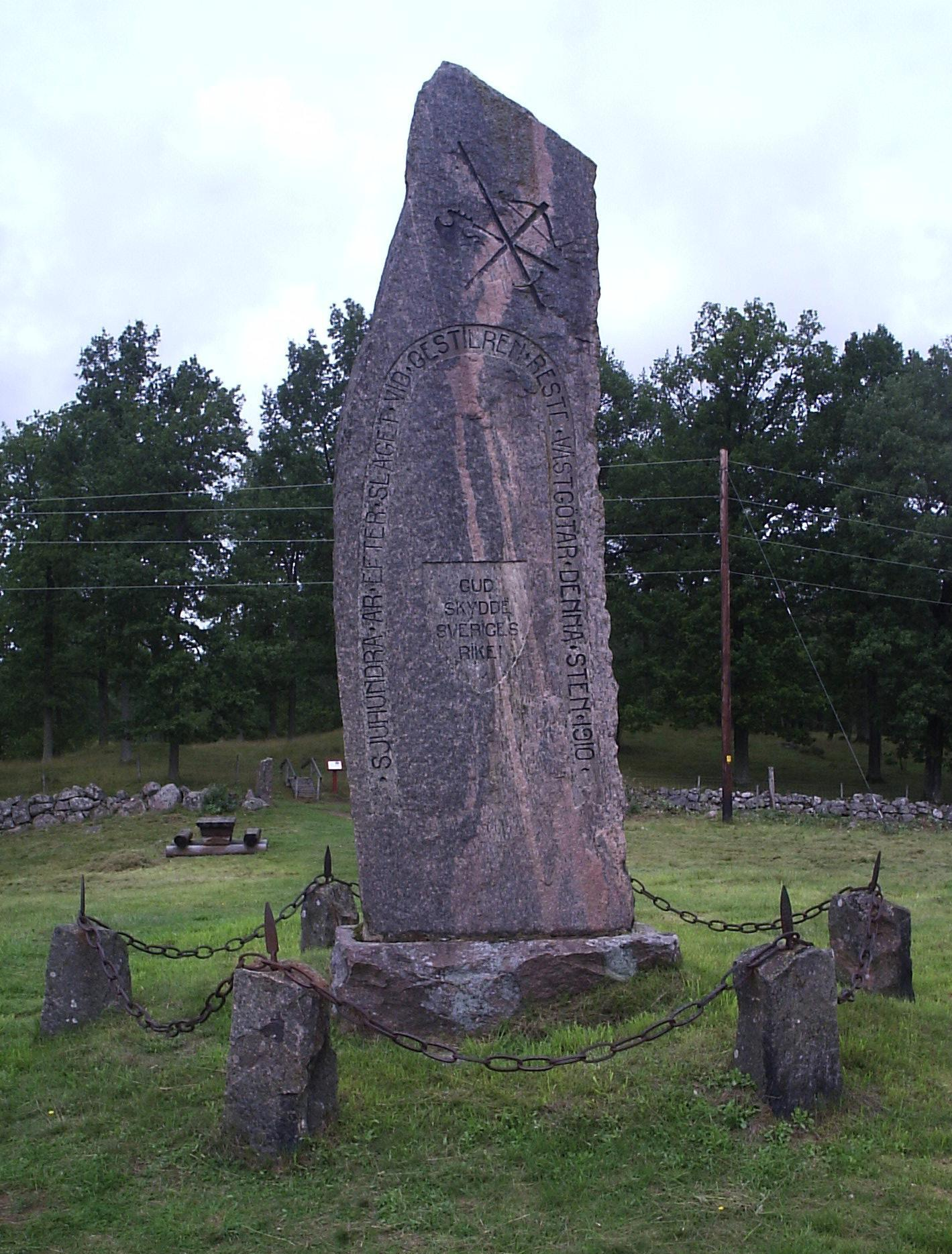
- Battle of Gestilren memorial in Varv's parish, Västergötland
Date	17 July 1210
Location	Gestilren, Sweden
Result	Swedish victory

Belligerents
Denmark	Sweden

Commanders and leaders
Sverker II of Sweden †	Eric X of Sweden

Strength
Unknown	Unknown

Casualties and losses
Unknown	Unknown

The Battle of Gestilren took place on July 17, 1210. The battle was fought between the exiled King of Sweden Sverker and the ruling King Eric X. Sverker had been beaten in the previous Battle of Lena, but returned with new forces. Sverker was however killed in the battle. The exact strength of the armies is unknown.

== Background ==
Sverker II had grown up in exile in Denmark and was accepted as king in 1195/96, to the detriment of the four sons of the previous King Canute I. He pursued a policy of strengthening the clerical estate, but ran into difficulties after twelve years of reign. The sole surviving son of Canute, Eric, was backed by the Birkebeiner party of Norway and ousted Sverker in 1207-08. Sverker sought assistance from King Valdemar the Victorious of Denmark and his powerful Danish in-laws. With a strong army he entered Västergötland in early 1208 but suffered a crushing defeat in the Battle of Lena. A very large part of the Danish army fell on the battlefield. Among the few survivors was Sverker himself who returned to Denmark. A later folksong emphasizes his determination and fatalism in the face of the disaster:

My father is slain through falsity and treachery,
And if I shall flee the land,
It will badly befall the Uppland peasantry,
And their followers at hand.
I will terminate my young life,
And my blood and spirit spill,
Before I renounce the royal name,
And to my enemies yield at will.

Pope Innocent III, impressed by Sverker's pro-papal policy, ordered Eric to settle the conflict with Sverker, or else take serious consequences. However, his admonitions did not have the desired effect. A new expedition was therefore equipped in Denmark in order to recapture the Swedish throne.

== The battle ==
In the summer of 1210, Sverker once again invaded the Swedish kingdom where Eric had meanwhile adopted royal titles. The army came to a place called Gestilren where it was confronted by Eric's troops on 17 July (alternatively, 16 August). The available details about the battle are utterly meagre. The short chronicle of the Westrogothic law says that "the Folkungs took his life; his own brother-in-law did it to him in Gestilren". An annal entry informs us of "warfare in Gestilren, on the 16th of August; there fell King Sverker and Folke Jarl, and many Folkungs." Thus the Swedish troops scored a victory in spite of great losses where one of their commanders, Folke Jarl, was slain. With the dramatic fall of Sverker, the war that had plagued Sweden for two and a half years came to an end, and peace was quickly concluded with Denmark. The banner that King Eric used in the battle was later bequeathed to Folke Jarl's nephew Eskil Magnusson, the lawspeaker of Västergötland, and bestowed on the Icelandic historian Snorri Sturluson in 1219.

The battle was a victory for the Folkung party of local autonomies, who acted against the centralising forces of Catholic monarchy. Sverker's nemesis Folke Jarl was probably a son of the powerful Jarl Birger Brosa (d. 1202) and the uncle of Birger Jarl, whose descendants ruled Sweden after 1250. If so, he was indeed a brother-in-law of Sverker. In early-modern historiography the royal branch of the clan was also called "Folkungs" which seems to be incorrect. The name may originally have alluded to the supporters of Folke Jarl at Gestilren, but then became the denomination for a party or faction. The party frequently opposed royal rule until they were defeated at the Battle of Sparrsätra in 1247, finally disappearing in c. 1280.

== The Gestilren problem ==
The location where this battle took place is the subject of a very long and very heated discussion between Swedish historians. Traditionally, the location was believed to be Varvs socken, Västergötland in Västergötland, where a monument (58°11′46″N 13°49′38″E) was erected in 1910 to commemorate the seven centuries since the battle. The main reason for the localization is a note in a 15th-century codex of the Westrogothic law, which says that the battle took place "in Gaestilsreen between Dala and Lena". The information implies that the field of slaughter was close to the scene of the 1208 battle. Historian Erik Lönnroth has argued that fighting took place "in or close to the gorge between the Gerum Hill and the Varv Hill, since the only way to confront heavy, superior, feudal cavalry, was when it was impossible to surround you on the flanks, instead forming a stable spear formation against them".

Others have argued that the battle took place in Östergötland, or that Gestilren should not be interpreted as a place name at all. Recently, archivist and historian Lars-Otto Berg has claimed that it was located at Gästre (59°45′N 16°57′E) in Uppland, Sweden, since he found the farm name "Gestilren" fifteen times in the local church records during the years 1580-1630. This is also close to the strongholds of the Folkung party. An annotation from the early 17th century records a local tradition suggesting a connection: "King Sverker's three farms - in Tillinge Hiersten, in Försth. Gestilren, in Biskull Landzberg - he was buried in Gestilren in the Sverker Hill".
