= Little Agda and Olof the Silent =

Little Agda and Olof the Silent (Swedish: Liten Agda och Olof Tyste) (fl. 1526), refers to a legend about a young couple in Sweden between the very first years of King Gustav Vasa (1523) and the last years of before the Lutheran Reformation (1527).

The title Liten Agda och Olof Tyste translates literally as: Little Agda and Olof the Silent. The title Agda Michelsdotter translates literally as: Agda, Michel's daughter; Olof is her boyfriend. After being kept from Olof by her father, she joins the Vadstena Abbey, a convent, instead of marrying a wealthy nobleman. She escapes from the convent and elopes with Olof, banished by the Church until the King grants the couple a reprieve.

Their story was told in Förr och nu i Wadstena (Past and present in Vadstena) by Constans Pontin. It bears similarities to the fate of Ingeborg Jönsdotter (d. 1524), a merchant's daughter from Vadstena who was forced to enter the same convent in 1495 after a love affair with a young noble.

== Background ==
According to the legend, Agda was the daughter of a wealthy merchant, Michel (or Mickel), in the city of Vadstena. She was in love with a young boy, Olof, who was turned away by her father. The sorrow of losing Agda made Olof sad and detached, and he became known as Olof Tyste, meaning Olof the Quiet One or Olof the Silent. Michel presented Agda to a wealthy man and told her to either marry him or enter a convent; she chose to enter the Vadstena Abbey of Saint Bridget. This was not at all to her father's liking, as he had expected her to choose marriage, but, as it says in the legend, "he had offered her a choice; and she had chosen" She entered the convent as a novice, a beginning student of the Church.

== Elopement ==
A year after Agda had become a novice, a great scandal occurred, which came to be known through the country. Somehow, Olof and Agda had managed to meet secretly during her time in the convent, and one night Agda climbed down the wall of the convent to the beach of Vättern, where Olof waited with a boat. Together, they escaped across the water to Västergötland. The reaction was fierce; a nun had broken the vow of chastity and committed the crime of heresy: the law of the church demanded that Agda be buried alive and that Olof be burned at the stake. The scandal of the convent abduction was reported to bishop Hans Brask in Linköping, who issued a ban on the couple and declared them outlaws. Henceforth, everyone was forbidden to give them food or water, to house them or to assist them in any way, and anyone was allowed to kill them without punishment.

== Banishment ==
Agda and Olof traveled to one of Olof's friends in Husaby. They were just about to be married, when their wedding ceremony was interrupted and the banishment declared to those present. They were immediately sent out of the church. People let them pass, "as if they were contaminated by the plague". For months, until and past Christmas they fled, as the legend says, from farm to farm. At first they were received in a friendly way, but as soon as the news of the banishment reached their hosts, they were turned away.

One day they were reached by the news that the king was in the city of Vadstena. Agda had heard that he sympathized with the Protestant religion, and she suggested that they should seek him out and appeal to him directly.

== The end ==
The king had given order that no one seeking an audience with him should be turned away during his visit in the city. The soldiers, though they stepped backwards from Agda and Olof, in fear of the clerical ban, did not dare to turn them away when they demanded to see the king.

The king, "received them with much goodness, folded their hands and promised to help them to the happy victory of their faithful love". He wrote to the bishop to recall the banishment right away. He also sent Agda and Olof with a military escort to the house of Agda's father, Michel, with the order that he should welcome his daughter and future son-in-law. Michel answered that the king had no say in his private affairs and that he would welcome his daughter and Olof by letting his servants hunt them away with dogs.

The king's chancellor Laurentius, who accompanied them, lost his temper and told Michel, on his own initiative, that the king had promised to cut off Michel's head if he did not kindly receive and nurse "his children". Michel believed him, and the next day, the king sent for him and reconciled him with Agda and Olof, and soon after, the king danced with Agda at her wedding.

== Historical accuracy ==
This event is said to have happened in the year of 1526, after the accession to Gustav Vasa on the throne (1523), and one year before the reformation (1527). In 1525, the King, Gustav Vasa, allowed for the marriage of the priest Olaus Petri, In 1526 he oversaw the translation of the bible, further earning him the reputation as a reformer.

It is confirmed that King Gustav did order the Bishop to recall the banishment of a woman who had been placed at the Vadstena Abbey but escaped with a suitor unwelcome by her family, with the words that the bishop had previously on several occasions allowed women to leave the convent, and that he suspected that the different attitude of the bishop on this occasion was that the woman in question left the convent because she wished to marry. In connection to this case, the King gave the order during the reformation that no one should be allowed to enter a convent without the approval of the monarch This instruction was given in 1527 and the man who helped his beloved to escape from the abbey was named as Olof

Agda's tale bears similarities to the fate of Ingeborg Jönsdotter (d. 1524), a merchant's daughter from Vadstena who was forced to enter the same convent in 1495 after a love affair with a young nobleman, with the difference that Jönsdotter remained in the convent and never saw her lover again.

== See also ==
- Maiden Abduction from Vreta
