= Gudhem =

- Location within Västra Götaland Location within Sweden
- Coordinates: 58°14′N 13°33′E
- Country: Sweden
- Province: Västergötland
- County: Västra Götaland County
- Municipality: Falköping Municipality

Area
  - Total: 0.34 km^{2} (0.13 sq mi)

Population (31 December 2010)
  - Total: 427
  - Density: 1,248/km^{2} (3,230/sq mi)
- Time zone: UTC+1 (CET)
  - Summer (DST): UTC+2 (CEST)
- Climate: Dfb

Gudhem is a locality situated in Falköping Municipality, Västra Götaland County, Sweden. It had 427 inhabitants in 2010.

Gudhem Hundred, or Gudhems härad, was a hundred of Västergötland in Sweden, the name meaning "God's Home".

Gudhem Abbey, initially a Benedictine and later Cistercian nunnery, operated in Gudhem between the 12th and 16th centuries.
