= Battle of Lena =

Medieval battle over the throne of Sweden

- Location within Sweden
Date	31 January 1208
Location	Kungslena, Sweden 58°14′N 13°50′E
Result	Swedish victory

Belligerents
Denmark	Sweden

Commanders and leaders
Sverker II of Sweden; Ebbe Sunesson †	Eric X of Sweden

Strength
12,000–18,000 soldiers and knights (numbers likely exaggerated)	7,000–10,000 armed peasants (numbers likely exaggerated)

Casualties and losses
Almost the whole army was destroyed	Light

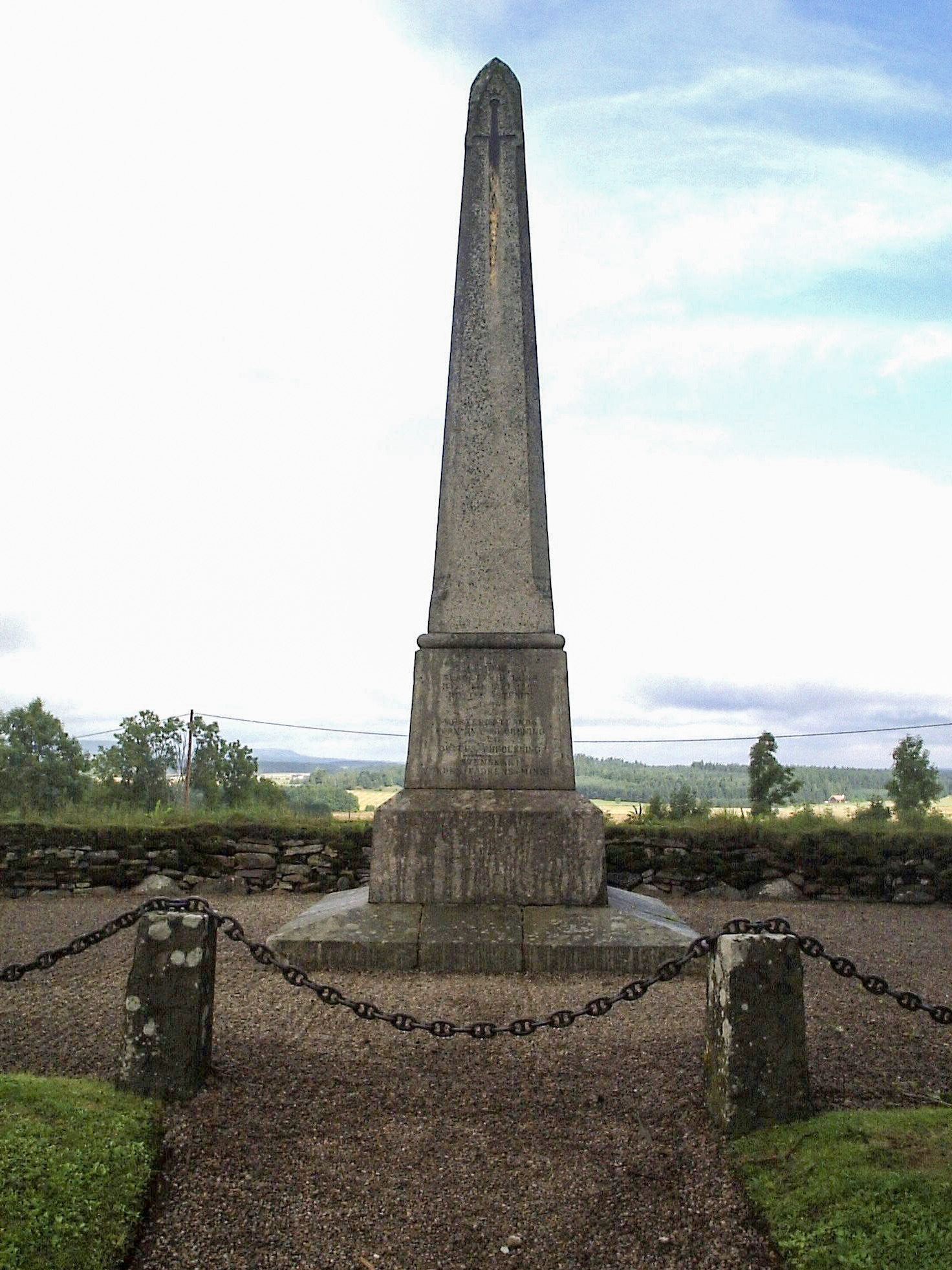
Battle of Lena memorial

The Battle of Lena occurred on 31 January 1208 and probably took place near Kungslena, in the Tidaholm Municipality in Västergötland, Sweden. It was an important battle between the Danish-backed King Sverker II of Sweden and Prince Eric. Eric's forces won a crushing victory; however, in July 1210, Sverker returned with a second army and was killed in the Battle of Gestilren.

== Background ==
The period 1150–1250 saw an intense rivalry between the House of Sverker and House of Eric, who alternated on the Swedish throne. The primary representative of the House of Eric, Eric Knutsson, returned from exile in Norway in 1207–08. There were marital connections between his family and the Norwegian ruling elite, but the sparse sources do not tell if Norwegian troops backed him. Sverker II fled to Denmark, where he had grown up before becoming king. All this suggests that many of the Swedish nobility rejected Sverker's rule.

Sverker's relative, King Valdemar the Victorious of Denmark, provided Sverker with auxiliaries, including a Czech contingent from Valdemar's father-in-law, King Ottokar I of Bohemia. However, Sverker's in-laws, the powerful Sunesen brothers, gathered the bulk of the troops. The army was led by Ebbe Sunesen, brother of Archbishop Andreas Sunesen. Medieval traditions estimate the size of the force at 12,000 or 18,000, although these numbers might be vastly exaggerated.

According to later tradition, the defending Swedish force was again half that of Sverker's forces, numbering between 7,000 and 10,000. Erik's army may have been made up in part by Norwegian auxiliaries. Norwegian historian P.A. Munch has questioned this, considering it unlikely that Eric's ally, Jarl Håkon Galen, would have had any troops to spare during the ongoing Norwegian civil wars.

== Battle ==
The invading army entered Västergötland in the middle of the winter. Frozen lakes and rivers may have facilitated the transportation of the troops. They met their adversary at Lena on 31 January 1208. No contemporary sources describe the battle in detail. We only know that the Danish troops suffered a crushing defeat and that Ebbe Sunesen and his brother Laurentius were killed. The Icelandic Flateyarbók states that "Junker Eric slew Ebbe Sunesen", possibly implying a personal meeting on the battlefield. Knut Jarl of the House of Bjälbo was killed as well, probably on the Swedish side. Also killed in the melée was a Magnus, possibly Knut Jarl's uncle Magnus Minniskiöld, father of Birger Jarl. Perhaps the Swedes used the winter weather to their advantage, as the Danish knights were slow and vulnerable in heavy snow.

Later Swedish and Danish tradition, while unreliable, bears witness to the impression that the cataclysmic battle had on posterity. A Swedish verse depicted the event as a plain battle between Sweden and Denmark: "It happened in Lena / Two Danes ran for one (Swede) / And from the Swedish men / Received a bad spanking on their backs". A Danish folksong emphasizes the deplorable internal Swedish conditions, as relatives fought each other: "It was ill to stand in the fighting / As the son let his father down". A song alleges that no more than 55 men escaped the bloodbath and made it back to Denmark:

The ladies stand on the high balcony,
They await their masters to arrive.
The horses return bloodied,
And the saddles are empty.

=== Odin ===
The Swedes won, according to legend, aided by Odin. The Norwegian Saga of Inge Bårdsson relates that a horseman arrived to the farmstead of a smith at Nesje on 26 January, and stayed overnight. The next morning the stranger baffled the smith through a display of supernatural powers, then said: "I have been to the north, and stayed in Norway for a long time, but I will now move over to Sweden." He then disclosed to the smith that he was Odin, spurred his horse, and jumped over a high fence out in the blue. The Battle of Lena occurred four days after this event.

== Aftermath ==
Among the few survivors was Sverker II, who fled to Denmark. The Pope took an interest in the cause of the fallen king and ordered Eric Knutsson to settle the matter and return kingship to Sverker. When Eric declined to meet these demands, Sverker returned from his Danish refuge with a new army. This second invasion ended with the Battle of Gestilren in July 1210. This time, Sverker was killed, securing King Eric's throne.
