= Askeby =

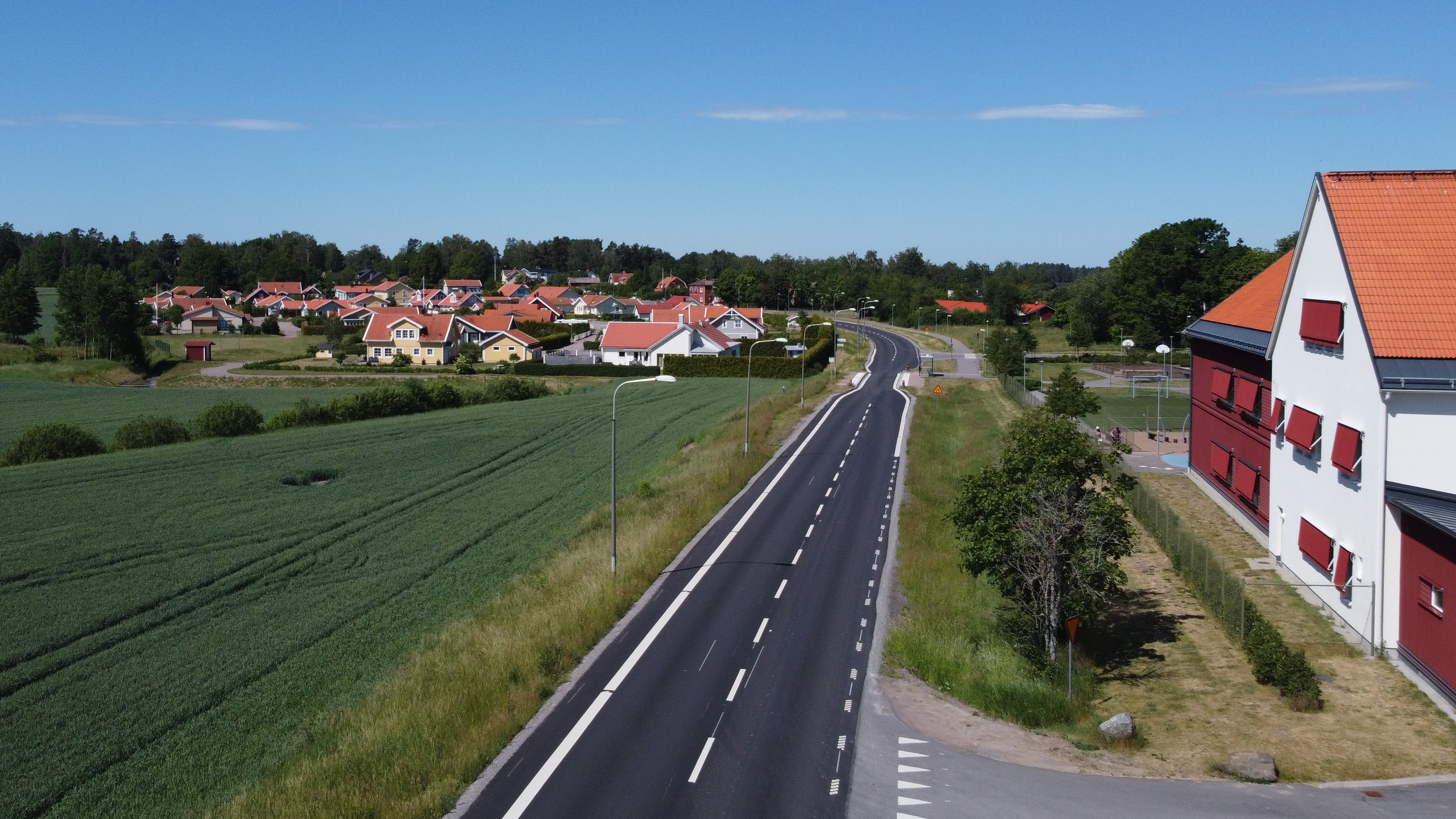

- Location within Östergötland Location within Sweden
- Coordinates: 58°25′N 15°50′E
- Country: Sweden
- Province: Östergötland
- County: Östergötland County
- Municipality: Linköping Municipality

Area
  - Total: 0.49 km^{2} (0.19 sq mi)

Population (31 December 2020)
  - Total: 499
  - Density: 1,000/km^{2} (2,600/sq mi)
- Time zone: UTC+1 (CET)
  - Summer (DST): UTC+2 (CEST)
- Climate: Cfb

Askeby is a locality situated in Linköping Municipality, Östergötland County, Sweden with 518 inhabitants in 2010.
