= Helen of Sweden (13th century) =

Swedish princess and abbess

Helen of Sweden (Helena; died probably before 1251) was a Swedish princess, a daughter of King Sverker II of Sweden, and later abbess of Vreta Abbey. She was the mother of Catherine Sunesdotter, queen consort of Sweden.

== Biography ==
Helen was born in Denmark, the daughter of King Sverker II and Queen Benedicta. Her father was living in exile there at the time. In 1195 or 1196, he became king of Sweden. He was deposed in 1208 and killed in battle in 1210.

Helen Sverkersdotter, the only daughter of the deposed king, was being educated at Vreta Abbey at the time of her father's death. Around 1210, she became one of the victims of the Vreta abductions.

Sune Folkesson belonged to one of the two dynasties that had rivalled each other for the Swedish throne since the 12th century, while Helen belonged to the House of Sverker. Her relatives opposed a marriage between Helen and Sune, whose father had been among Sverker's opponents in the battle in which he was killed. According to tradition, Sune abducted Helen and took her to Ymseborg, where they later married. They had two surviving daughters, Benedicta Sunesdotter and Catherine Sunesdotter.

In 1216, Helen's brother became King John I of Sweden. When he died childless in 1222, Helen and her daughters represented the surviving line of the Sverker dynasty. In 1243, her daughter Catherine Sunesdotter (c. 1215–1252) married King Eric XI, thereby uniting the two rival royal dynasties by marriage.

Around 1244, Helen's younger daughter, Benedicta Sunesdotter, was abducted from Vreta Abbey, where she was being educated, by Laurens Pedersson, Justiciar of Östergötland. Benedicta was soon released and later married the nobleman Svantepolk Knutsson, Lord of Viby.

== Sources ==
- Lagerqvist, Lars O. (1982). Sverige och dess regenter under 1.000 år (in Swedish). Albert Bonniers Förlag AB. ISBN 91-0-075007-7.
- Borænius, Magnus. Klostret i Vreta i Östergötland. 1724 & 2003, p. 31.
