= Örebro Synod =

The Örebro Synod took place at Candlemas (February 2), the 40th day of the Christmas season) in Örebro in Sweden in 1529. It was the first Synod in Sweden since the introduction of the Protestant Swedish Reformation in 1527, and regarded as the theological completion of the Reformation, following the economic policy of the Reformation introduced at the Reduction of Gustav I of Sweden in 1527. It did not abolish the Catholic rituals, but adopted a policy aimed to make them slowly cease to be performed.

The theological reforms were at this point not radically changed. There were three important reforms taken at this synod:

1. The Bishops were to control that all the parish vicars used only the unaltered words of the Bible in their sermons. Vicars and priests were to be tutored in the words of the scripture and to secure this, scholars with knowledge were to be appointed to control the vicars of every city parish to ensure this, and city priests were to inspect the parish vicars of the country to ensure that only what which could be found in the Bible was preached there, effectively putting the messages of the sermons under control.
2. Bishops were allowed to give dispense for several of the marriages previously banned because of to close relations. The church was allowed to practice punishment for worldly crimes when secular justice was found lacking. The Monks were, as were the priests, also subjected to control to ensure that they did not preach other than what could be found in the Bible. The Feast days to the Saints was to be suppressed, with the exception of the feast days of God himself, the Virgin Mary and the memorial days of the patron saints of each church.
3. The rituals of the church, such as pilgrimages, statues and relics of saints and other Catholic habits were to be allowed to continue. However, they were to be "explained" and demystified, in an effort to make people discontinue them of their own free will. For example: while the statues of the saints were allowed to remain in the churches, the public were to be instructed that they were not to be objects of religious worship, but only to be used as memorials of religious role models. Similarly, while pilgrimages to holy places were not to be stopped, people were to be instructed that they were merely made to be a meditative experience, and not to be regarded as a religious act which could bring the performer any absolution or any other religious benefit.
