= Benedicta Hvide =

Queen of Sweden from 1196 to 1199

Benedicta
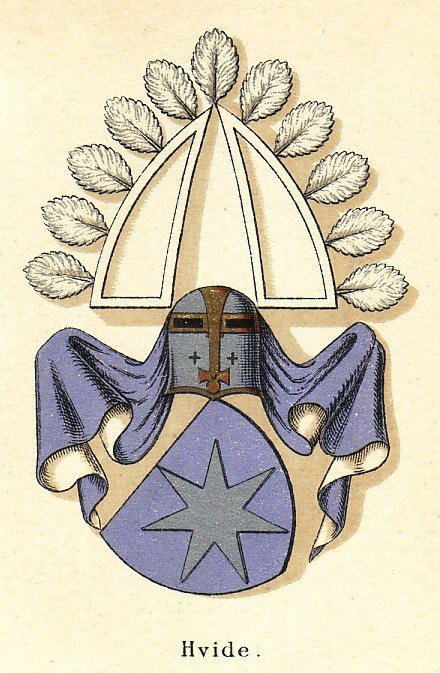
- Hvide arms

Queen consort of Sweden
- Tenure: 1196–1199
- Born: c. 1165/70; Knadrup
- Died: c. 1199/1200; Sweden
- Spouse: Sverker II of Sweden
- Father: Ebbe Sunesson Hvide

Benedicta Hvide also called Benedicta Ebbesdotter (c. 1165 or 1170 – c. 1199 or 1200) was Queen of Sweden as the first wife of king Sverker II. She belonged to the House of Hvide of Denmark and in Sweden was often called Queen Bengta.

== Early life ==
Our knowledge of Benedicta comes from a genealogy of the Hvide family compiled in the Sorø Abbey in the 14th century. From the terse data of this source, the following life-story has been deduced. Benedicta was born in Knadrup in Northern Zealand in Denmark between 1165 and 1170 as the child of the noble Ebbe Sunesson Hvide. The Swedish infant prince Sverker Karlsson was brought to Denmark in 1167 after the killing of his father, and was apparently raised by his powerful maternal relatives. Most probably he met his future bride, a kinswoman of his mother, there, and married her when reaching manly years. This may have happened in the mid-1180s.

== Queen of Sweden ==
In 1195 or 1196, her spouse became king of Sweden, and she became queen consort. The same year, her relative, the priest Andreas Sunesson, returned to Denmark from France and became the leading clerical politician in the archbishopric under Absalon, also a relative of Benedicta. It is probable that Queen Benedicta shared the strongly pro-clerical position of her husband, and supported the power aspirations of the Church and the archbishop Olov Lambatunga in Uppsala.

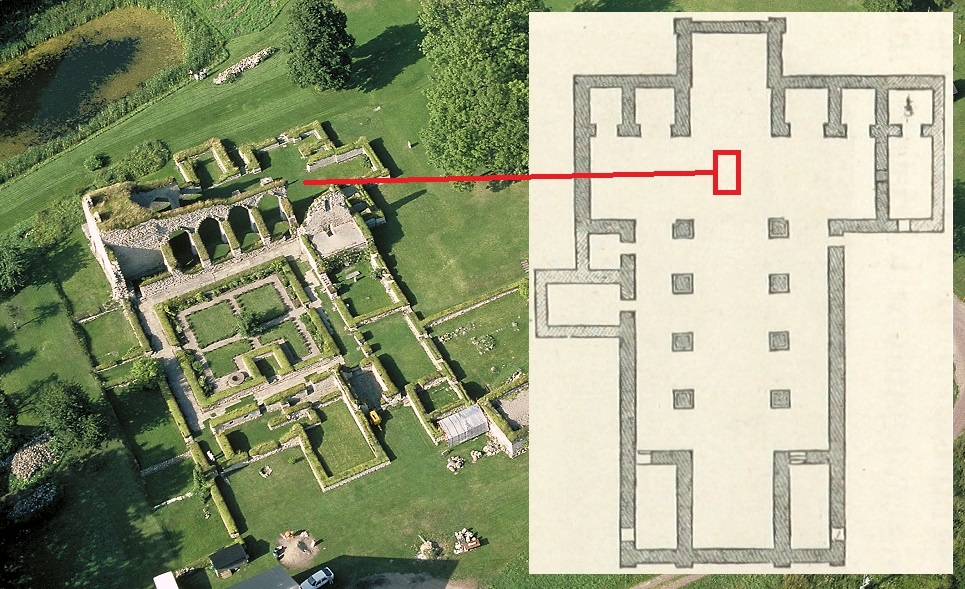
Composite showing the location of Sverker I's family grave at Alvastra Abbey where Queen Benedicta has been assumed to be buried

Since Sverker's next queen Ingegerd gave birth to a son in 1201, it is assumed that Queen Benedicta died no later than in 1199 or 1200. The cause of her death is unknown, but is sometimes guessed that she succumbed in childbirth. However, a grave inscription from the so-called Sverker Chapel in Alvastra has been associated with her. It mentions "the servant of Our Lord Jesus Christ, Benedicta", with an expression of hope that "she may find rest from the horrible disease which struck her".

== Problems of chronology ==
The extreme curtness of the sources on Sverker II's wives has given rise to an alternative chronology of the marriages. It has been suggested that Ingegerd was in fact his first consort, which tied him to the powerful House of Bjälbo in Östergötland. Ingegerd's father, Jarl Birger Brosa, was presumably instrumental in arranging the peaceful succession in 1195/96, when Sverker was enthroned after the death of his father's murderer Canute I. On the other hand, Sverker was able to gather strong support from his Danish in-laws when he tried to take back his kingdom from Canute I's son Eric in 1208. This support would have come more naturally if Sverker was married to Benedicta at this time.

== Children ==
1. Helena Sverkersdotter born c. 1190, died after 1222, mother of Queen Catherine of Sweden.
2. Karl Sverkersson the younger (d. 1198); parentage unconfirmed.
3. Christina (d. 1252), married to Henry Borwin II of Mecklenburg; parentage unconfirmed.
4. Margareta (1192–1232), married to Wizlaw I, Prince of Rügen; parentage unconfirmed.

Benedikte Ebbesdotter Born: 1165/1170 Died: 1199/1200
Swedish royalty
Preceded by Cecilia Johansdotter	Queen consort of Sweden; 1196–1199/1200	Succeeded by Ingegerd Birgersdotter
