= Reduction of Gustav I of Sweden =

Transfer of property from Church to Crown

The Reduction of Gustav I of Sweden, was an important reform during the Protestant Swedish Reformation, in which king Gustav I of Sweden ordered a reduction in church property and the return of land to the crown, making the national church dependent upon the monarch and effectively ending Swedish monastic life. This organised confiscation and transfer of the property of the Swedish Catholic church to the Crown – initiated at the Västerås riksdag of 1527 and finalised in the 1540s – was the economic phase of the Swedish Reformation and was followed by the Örebro Synod, which dealt with theological matters.

== The reduction ==
The goal of the reduction was for all church property to be transferred to the crown, and the independent income of the clergy to be replaced by an allowance or salary paid by the crown.

However, the king also wished to strengthen the position of the Swedish nobility, and therefore also allowed for all private donations of lands and estates to churches, bishops and convents since the reign of Charles VIII of Sweden to be retracted by the benefactors, or the families and descendants of the benefactors.

=== Property of Bishops ===
In the Reduction, all goods, lands and assets, particularly the formerly clerical castles, estates and strongholds belonging to Bishops and cathedrals, were to be regarded as Crown property, and the Bishops were henceforth to be provided for by the crown rather than from their own goods, in effect making the church economically dependent on the monarch. This transition was introduced in stages, often during the vacancies between the death of a bishop and the appointment of his successor.

=== Property of Convents ===
Property of monastic institutions in Sweden was subject to the same rules, and their lands and property declared property of the crown. Each convent was placed under the supervision of a nobleman who was to manage the former convent property for the crown. While the monks and nuns were allowed to remain in their conventual buildings, under government protection and with a state allowance, the monastic communities effectively lost their economic independence, and started to die out. The reform was therefore in effect the dissolution of the Swedish convents.

The rule that allowed for the families of former benefactors to retract land and property donated to the church was particularly damaging to the convents.

=== Property of local churches and shrines ===
From 1539, the final stage was introduced, in which the property of local vicars was also declared crown property, and valuables were confiscated from local churches and shrines - a visible sign of the reformation which caused opposition among the peasantry and contributed to the Dalecarlian rebellions and the Dacke War.
