= Helen of Sweden (12th century) =

Queen of Denmark from 1156 to 1157

Queen consort of Denmark
- Tenure: 1156–1157
- Born: 1130s Denmark
- Died: fl. 1158; Sweden
- Burial: Vreta Abbey
- Spouse: Canute V of Denmark
- Father: Sverker I of Sweden
- Mother: Ulvhild Håkansdotter

Helen (Swedish: Helena or Elin - 1130s – fl. 1158), is the assumed name of a medieval Swedish princess and Danish queen, Queen consort of King Canute V of Denmark. The date of her birth is not known; her father was King Sverker I of Sweden and her mother has been assumed to be Sverker's first spouse, Queen Ulvhild.

== Identity ==
During the period 1146-1157 the Danish kingdom was split between two rival kings, Canute V and Sweyn III. In 1154, Canute allied with his kinsman Valdemar, the future King Valdemar the Great, and sought support from his stepfather Sverker I of Sweden. During his stay he was engaged to a daughter of Sverker, while Valdemar betrothed Sverker's stepdaughter Sophia of Minsk. The name of Canute's fiancée is not mentioned in the chronicles. However, it has been assumed by modern research that her name was Helen, also called Elin. The basis for this conclusion is the Necrologium Lundense which mentions an Elena Regina with the death date 31 December. Since no other Danish queen of that name is known, it is likely that Sverker's daughter is meant. According to a hypothesis she may be identified with a non-official semi-legendary saint called Helen who was venerated in Sweden and, apparently, Denmark.

== Queen of Denmark ==
At the end of 1156, Canute V traveled to Sweden to console his mother after the assassination of King Sverker. At the same time he picked up his Swedish bride. Thus she left Sweden for a position as a Danish queen, which would turn out to be brief and tragical. In 1157, Canute and Valdemar attended a feast of reconciliation in Roskilde with Sweyn III. During the feast, Sweyn's men fell on his two rivals and Canute was murdered, while Valdemar managed to slip away. Sweyn was killed later in the same year, leaving Valdemar as the victor and sole Danish ruler. As it seems, Canute's queen returned to Sweden after the Roskilde incident. A 16th-century copy of a medieval list of donations says that a certain Queen Helena donated land in Slaka parish to Vreta Abbey in Östergötland, then entered the abbey as a nun. On the basis of this, some historians assume that Canute's queen withdrew from the world shortly after her husband's murder, in about 1158, joining her sister Ingegerd (d. 1204) who was the prioress of Vreta.

== Literature ==
- Ahnlund, Nils. "Till frågan om den äldsta Erikskulten i Sverige". Historisk tidskrift 68, 1948.
- Ahnlund, Nils. "Den nationella och folkliga Erikskulten", in B. Thordeman (ed.). Erik den helige. Stockholm, 1954.
- Lagerqvist, Lars O. "Sverige och dess regenter under 1.000 år". Stockholm: Albert Bonniers Förlag AB, 1982 (ISBN 91-0-075007-7).
- Rosborn, Sven. När hände vad i Nordens historia. Lund: Historiska media, 1997 (ISBN 91-9719-926-5).
- Wallin, Curt.Knutsgillena i det medeltida Sverige. Kring kulten av de nordiska helgonkungarna [Historiskt arkiv, 16]. Stockholm: Almqvist & Wicksell, 1975 (ISBN 91-7402-006-4).

Helen of Sweden (12th century) Born: 1130s Died: after 1157
| Preceded by Adela of Meissen | Queen consort of Denmark; 1156–1157 | Succeeded by Sofia of Minsk |
