= Katarina Sunesdotter =

Queen of Sweden from 1244 to 1250

Katarina
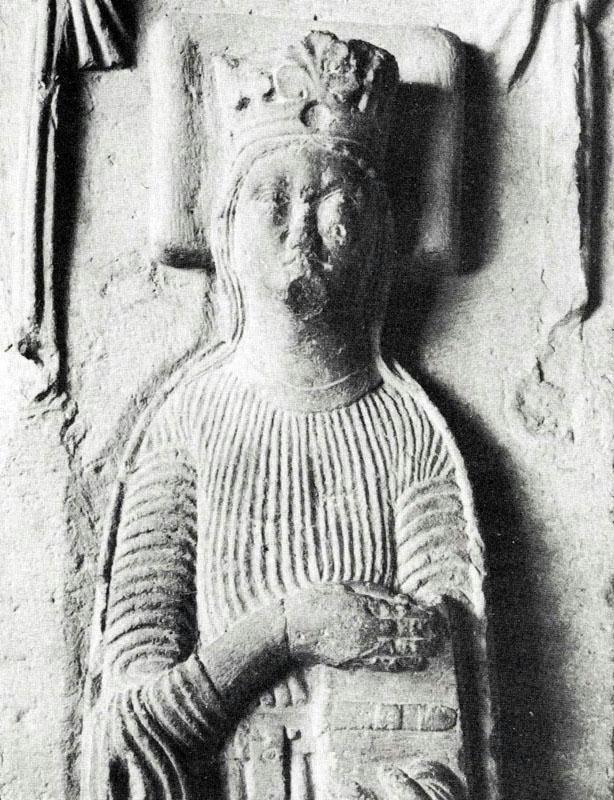
- Tomb of Katarina

Queen consort of Sweden
- Tenure: 1244–1250
- Born: 1215
- Died: 1252 (aged 36–37); Gudhem Abbey
- Burial: Gudhem Abbey
- Spouse: Erik Eriksson
- House: House of Bjälbo
- Father: Sune Folkesson
- Mother: Helena Sverkersdotter of Sweden

Katarina Sunesdotter (c. 1215 – 1252), also known as Karin, was Queen of Sweden from 1244 to 1250 as the wife of King Erik Eriksson. In her later years she served as abbess of Gudhem Abbey in Falbygden.

== Heir of the Sverker dynasty ==
Katarina was the eldest daughter of Helena Sverkersdotter and Sune Folkesson. Katarina did not have any brothers, but a sister, Benedikta. Katarina's maternal grandparents were King Sverker the Younger and Queen Benedicta Hvide. Descending from the families of Bjälbo and Sverker, she was a member of one of the Geatish clans. Katarina's father Sune Folkesson was Lord of Ymseborg, lawspeaker of Västergötland, and in some literature he is referred to as Earl of the Swedish.

== Queen of Sweden ==
Erik Eriksson (1215–50) of the House of Erik became king in 1222 and was exiled by co-king Knut Långe from 1229 to 1234. Eric returned to Sweden on Knut's death in 1234 and served as king until his own death in 1250. Young Erik was, according to semi-legendary material, physically lame and spoke with a stutter ("läspe och halte"), and he was reportedly of a kindly nature. Erik and Katarina were married in order to strengthen Erik's claim to the throne, as Katarina was of royal blood on her mother's side. The marriage took place in 1243 or 1244, at Fyrisängen near Uppsala. Katarina had received an immense dower upon the marriage: some legends speak romantically about "half the kingdom".

== Queen dowager and abbess ==
Erik died in 1250. Upon the death of her husband, the Queen Dowager retreated to Gudhem Abbey. Because Scandinavian customary law dictated that no clan property could be held by a member of a religious order, she transferred some lands, including her queenly dower, to certain relatives and gave others as donations to ecclesiastical institutions. For example, her sister Benedikta received as a gift from her the town of Söderköping. Katarina soon became the Abbess of Gudhem Abbey, and served in that position until her death in 1252.

Since she immediately devoted herself to a sequestered religious life and not to family at Erik's death, the conclusion has tended to be that they did not have any surviving children. Erik's nephew, Valdemar Birgersson was chosen as the next King of Sweden.

Katarina Sunesdotter Born: 1215 Died: 1252
Royal titles
Vacant Title last held by Helena Pedersdotter	Queen consort of Sweden; 1244–1250	Vacant Title next held by Sofia Eriksdotter
