= Vreta Abbey =

First nunnery in Sweden (12th century – 1582)

Coordinates: 58.482°N 15.518°E

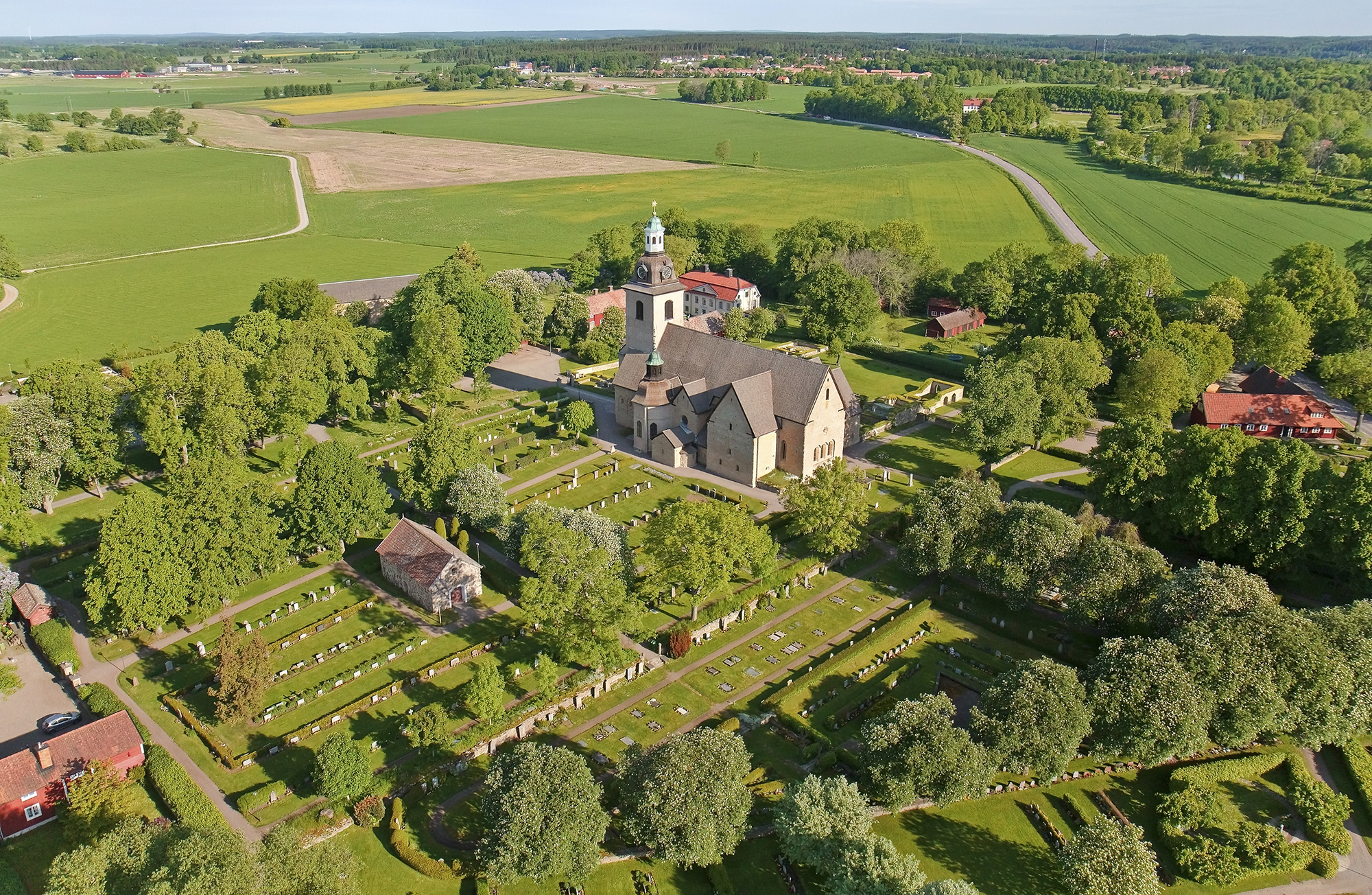
Aerial view of Vreta Abbey

Vreta Abbey (Swedish: Vreta kloster), in operation from the beginning of the 12th century to 1582, was the first nunnery in Sweden, initially Benedictine and later Cistercian, and one of the oldest in Scandinavia. It was located in the present-day municipality of Linköping in Östergötland.

== History ==
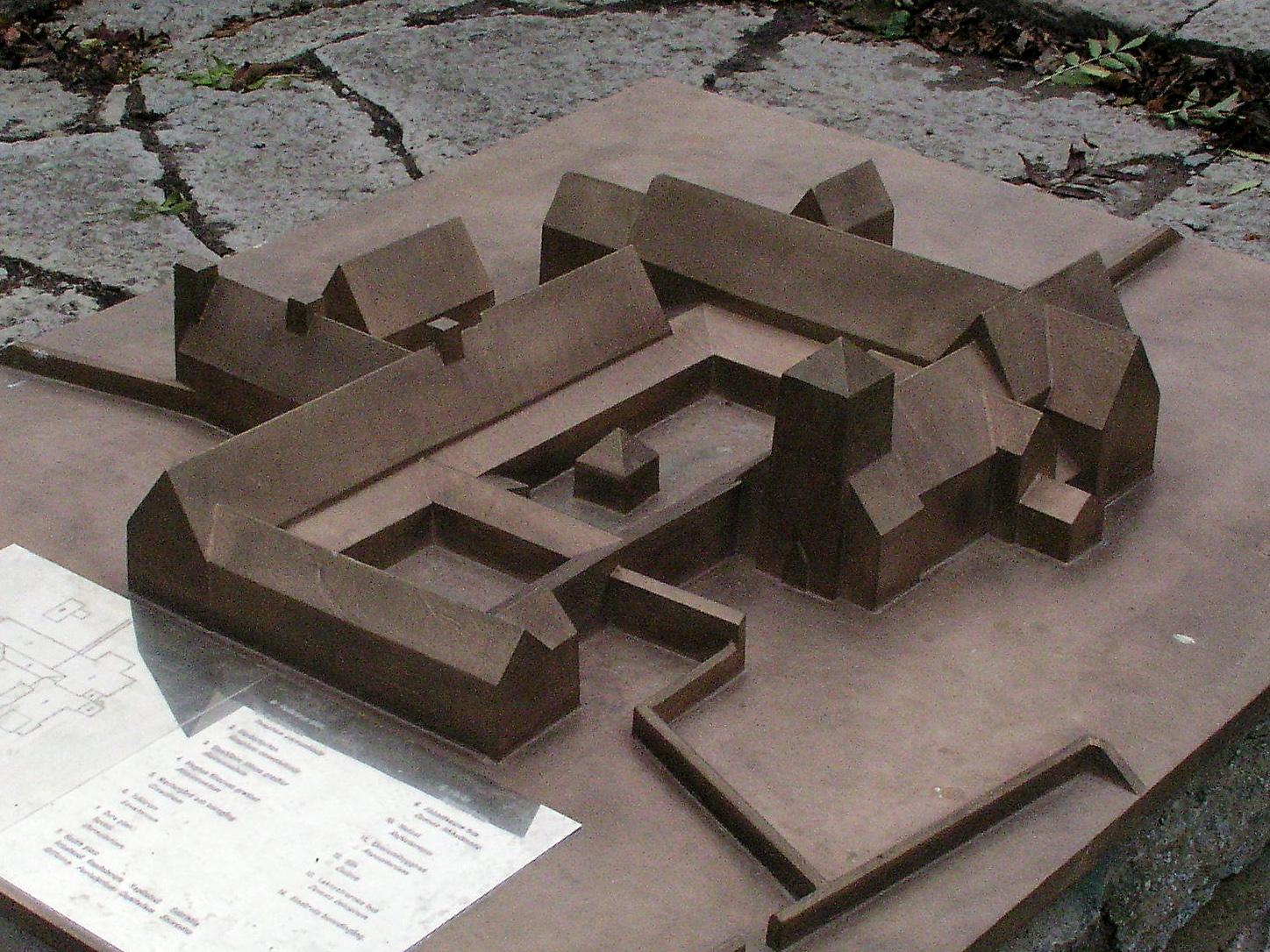
Model of medieval Vreta Abbey

The exact year of the foundation is not known. The abbey was founded by King Inge the Elder of Sweden and Queen Helena on the orders of Pope Paschal II, which gives a date range for the foundation: Paschal became pope in 1099; the date of Inge's death is disputed, but probably occurred around 1105 or a little later. In the following decade King Inge the Younger and Queen Ulvhild made large donations to it.

The original buildings burned down in the early 13th century, but were rebuilt, and a new church was dedicated in the presence of King Magnus Ladulås and Queen Helvig of Holstein in 1289.

Vreta Abbey was a house of Benedictine nuns until 1162, when it was turned into a Cistercian nunnery. The first Cistercian abbess was Ingegerd, sister of Karl Sverkersson. A second sister, Helena, widow of Canute V of Denmark, entered Vreta as a nun after her husband's death in 1157, and other members of the Swedish and Danish royal families were also here. In the 13th century, the Swedish princess Helena Sverkersdotter were among its abbesses.

It was a prestigious establishment, and the church is the burial place of the kings Inge the Elder, Philip, Inge the Younger and Magnus Henriksson, and the princes Ragnvald (son of Inge the Elder) and Sune, plus according to an older source the latter's young nephews, Alf and Boleslaw Johansson. It served as a school for daughters of Sweden's ruling families and nobility. Vreta Abbey has entered folklore as the scene during the 13th century of a number of prominent abductions of girls for marriages disapproved of by their families.

Vreta was the mother house of Askeby Abbey near Linköping, Riseberga Abbey in Närke and Solberga Abbey in Gotland.

=== Dissolution ===
As a result of the Reformation the abbey was forbidden to accept any new novices, but was otherwise treated very leniently. It continued in use as a school for daughters of the nobility and a retirement place for old noblewomen, and in 1529, the king allowed the last abbess, Sigrid Botholfsdotter (d. 1538), to buy it, and its activities continued undisturbed. Vreta Abby received the nuns from the former Askeby Abbey and Skänninge Abbey when they were closed in 1529 and 1544 respectively. In 1536, Gustav I gave the abbey and its assets to his Catholic mother-in-law Ebba Eriksdotter Vasa; she spent her last years here and died in 1549. There were still nuns here in 1562, and the last two of whom, Brita Gisledotter and Kirstin Månsdotter, died in 1582.

Vreta Abbey's remaining church now belongs to the Church of Sweden.

== Site and buildings ==
Klosterhuset (the granary and museum of the Vreta Abbey)

The church continued in use as a Lutheran parish church and still stands today, distinguished by its possession of a medieval hagioscope. The remaining buildings were mostly allowed to fall into ruin.

Between 1916 and 1926 the ruins were excavated, and large portions to the north of the church, which was itself restored between 1914 and 1917, remain visible. The finds, including an unusual wooden waterpipe, are on display in the adjoining museum.

Apart from the church, the only monastic building completely preserved is the barn, although some walls were reconstructed in the 20th century. The stones from the former refectory were used to build the tower of Linköping Cathedral.

== Abbesses ==
The abbesses are only partially known.

- Princess Ingegerd Sverkersdotter of Sweden (1164–1204)
- Cecilia (mentioned in 1216–1222)
- Katarina (mentioned in 1248)
- Katarina Svantepolksdotter, died 1329, (mentioned in 1289–1323; referred to as the 7th abbess)
- Ingrid Svantepolksdotter, sister of the above (mentioned in 1323–1344)
- Kristina Karlsdotter (1344–1350)
- Ingrid (mentioned in 1366)
- Cecilia (mentioned in 1381)
- Margareta "Märeta" (1393–1399)
- Elin Bruddadotter (mentioned in 1413–1417)
- Ingegerd (mentioned in 1444–1446)
- Elin Nilsdotter (mentioned in 1465)
- Ramborg (mentioned in 1474)
- Kristina (mentioned in 1486)
- Sigrid Botholfsdotter (1513–1538)

== Gallery ==
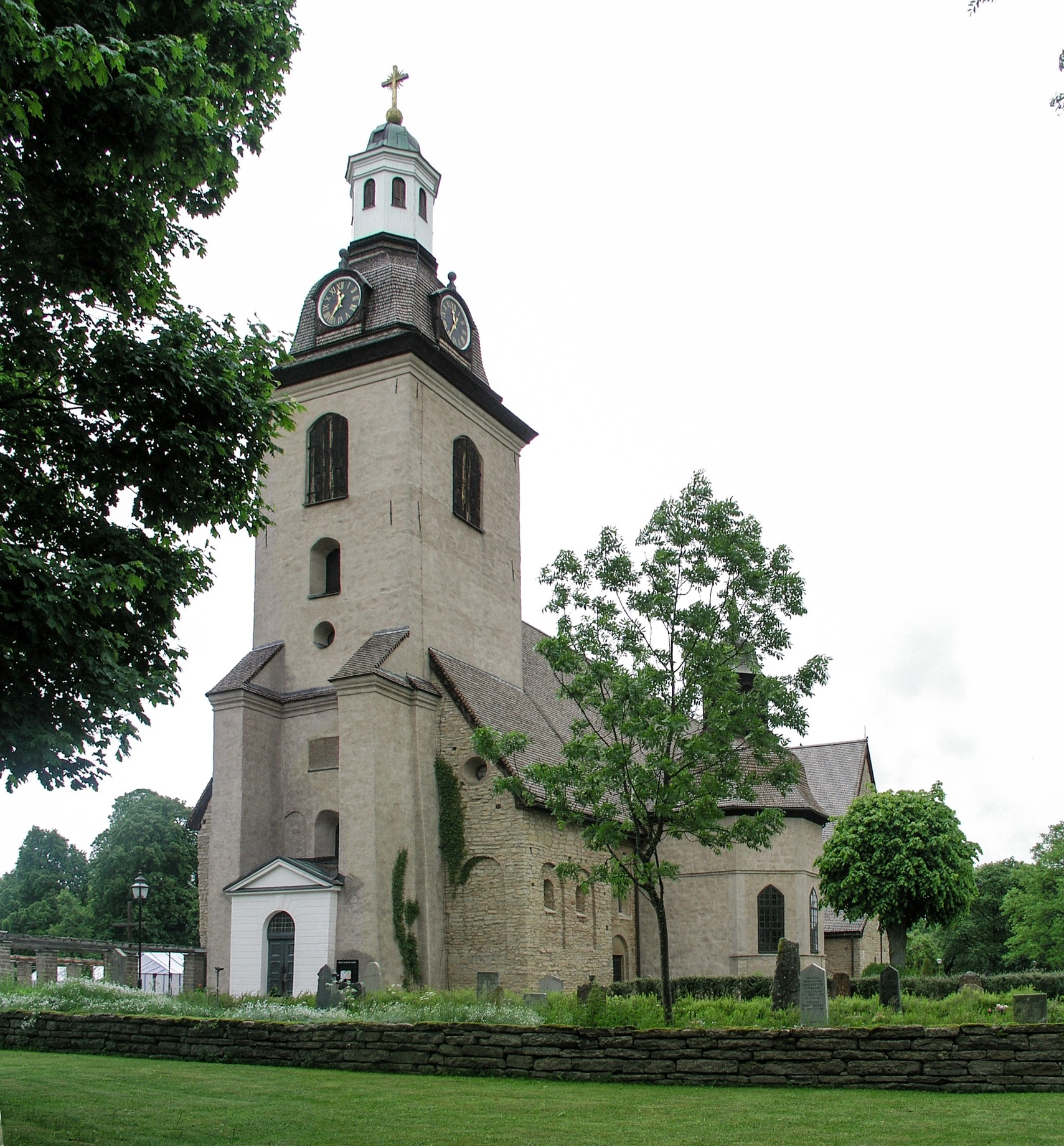
Vreta Abbey Church from the early 12th century

Vreta Abbey Church from the cemetery

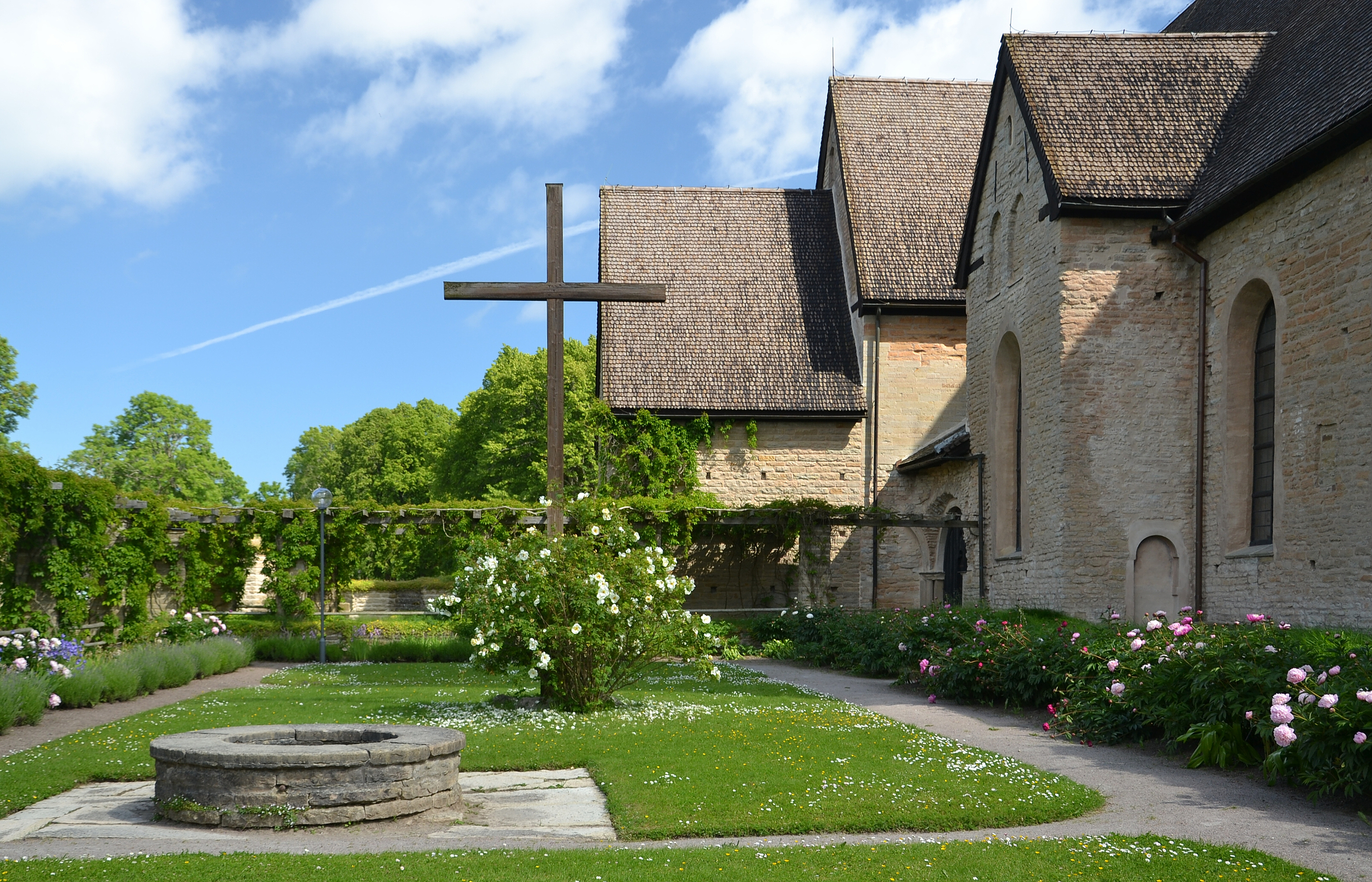
Vreta Monastery Church and gardens (claustrum)

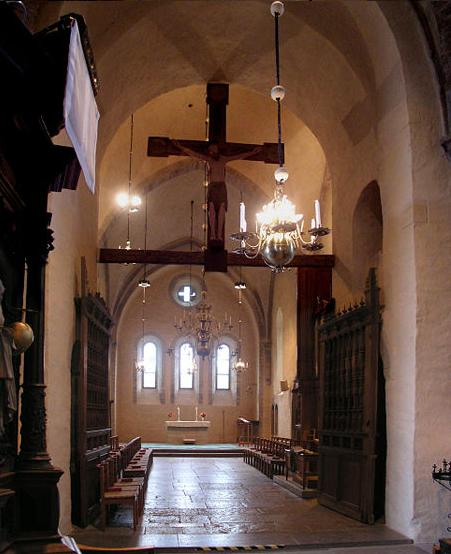
Stenkil dynasty windows in Vreta Abbey

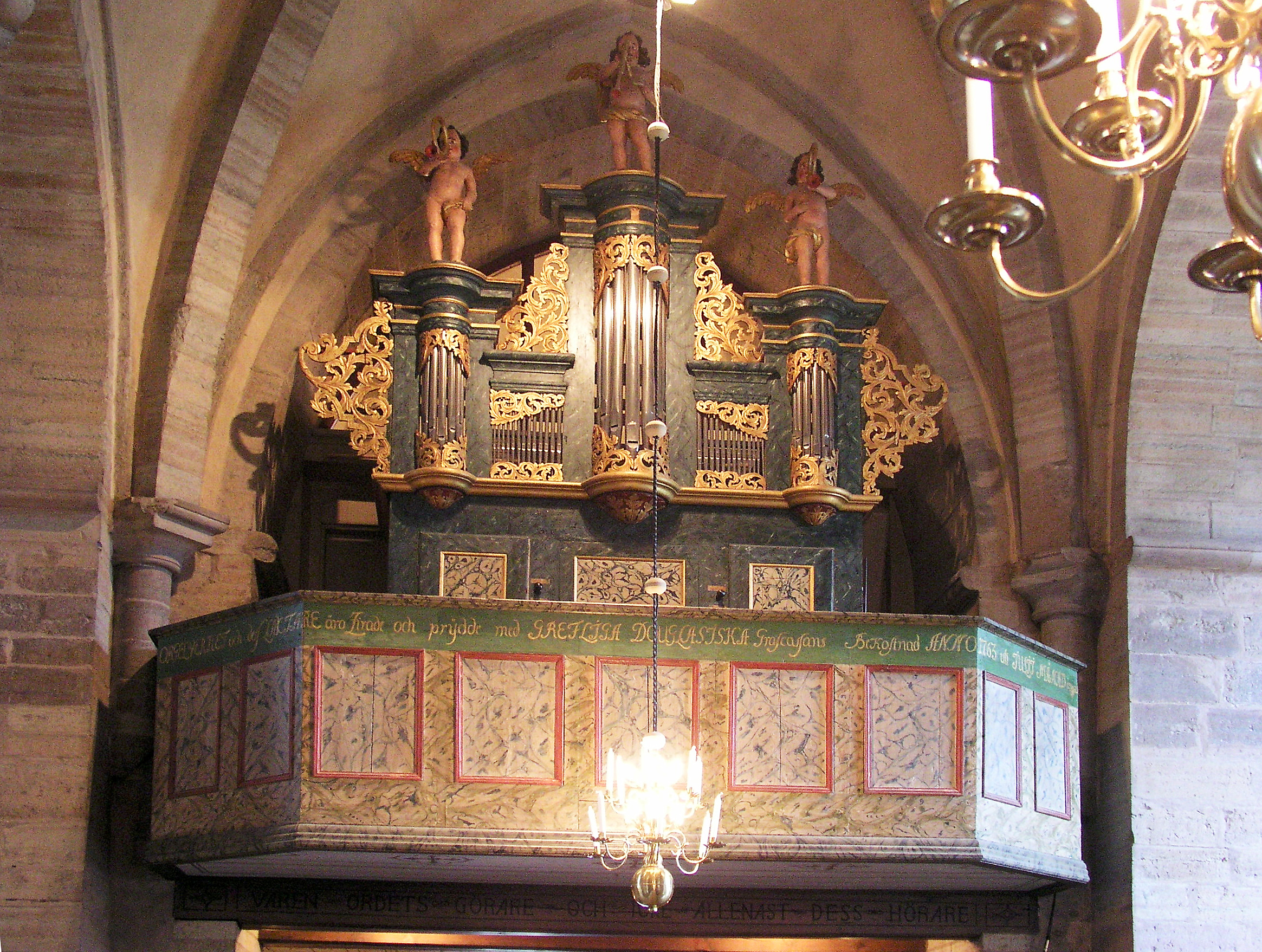
The church organ

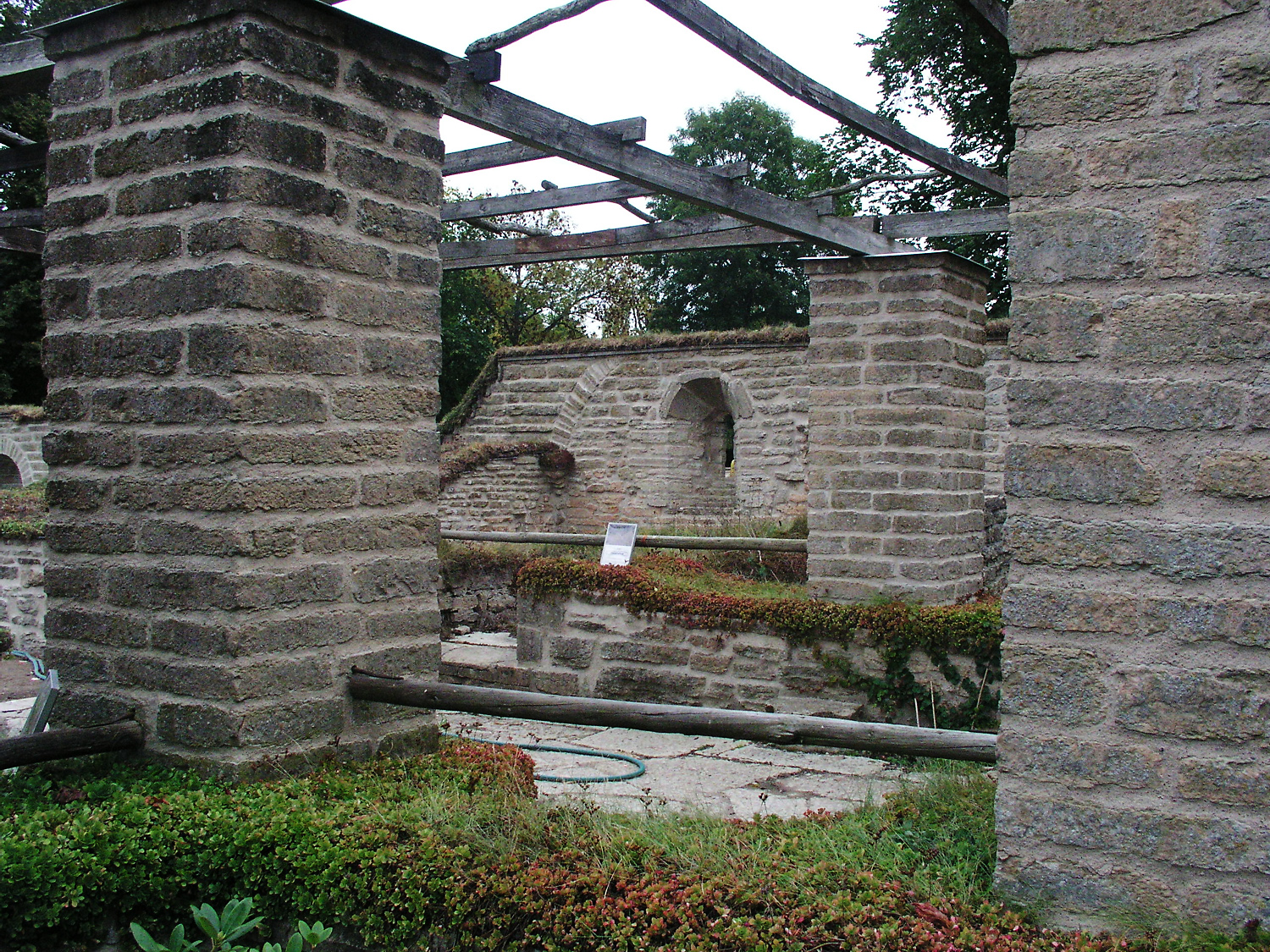
Restored walls

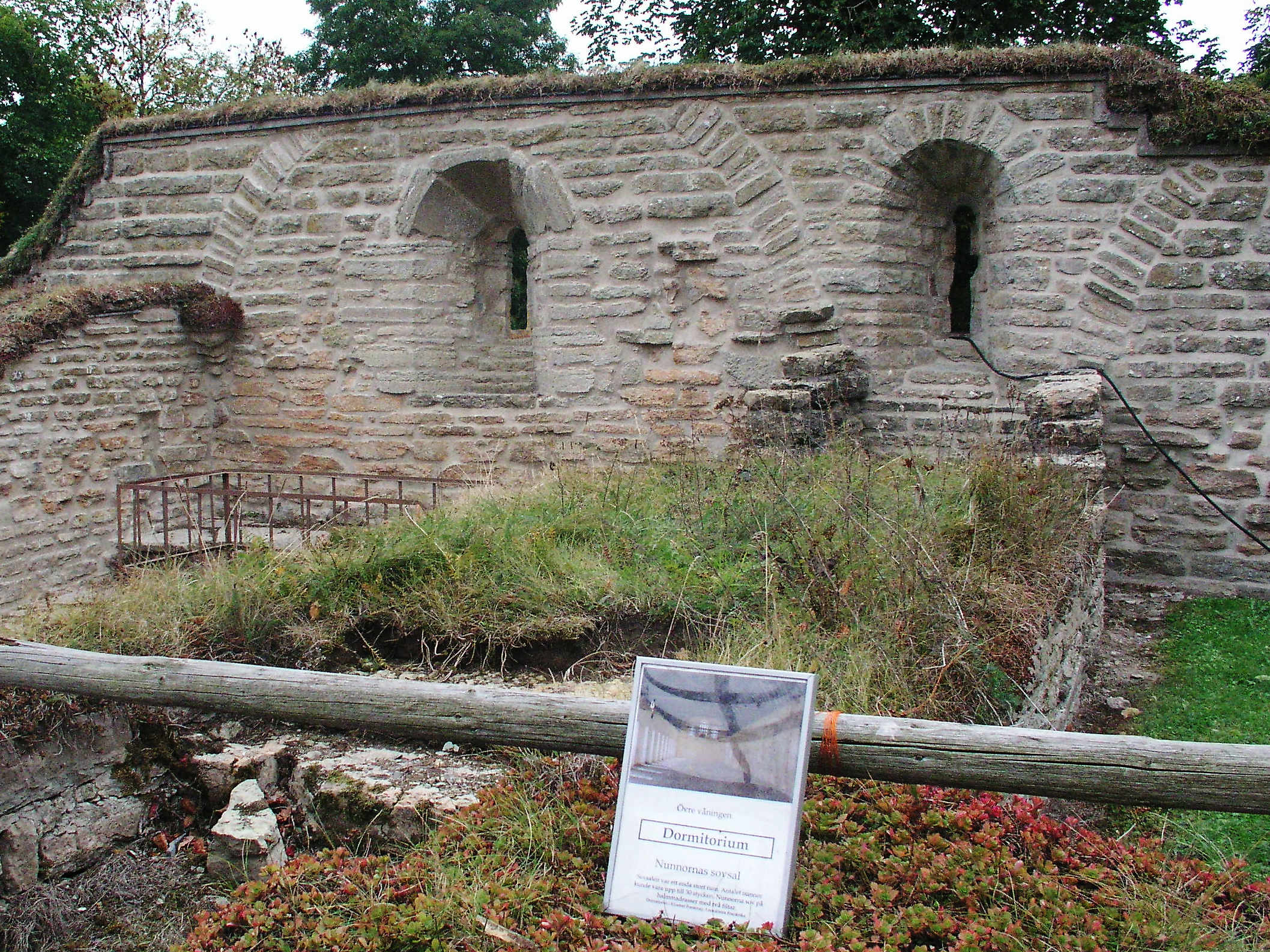
Restoration: day room and chapter room

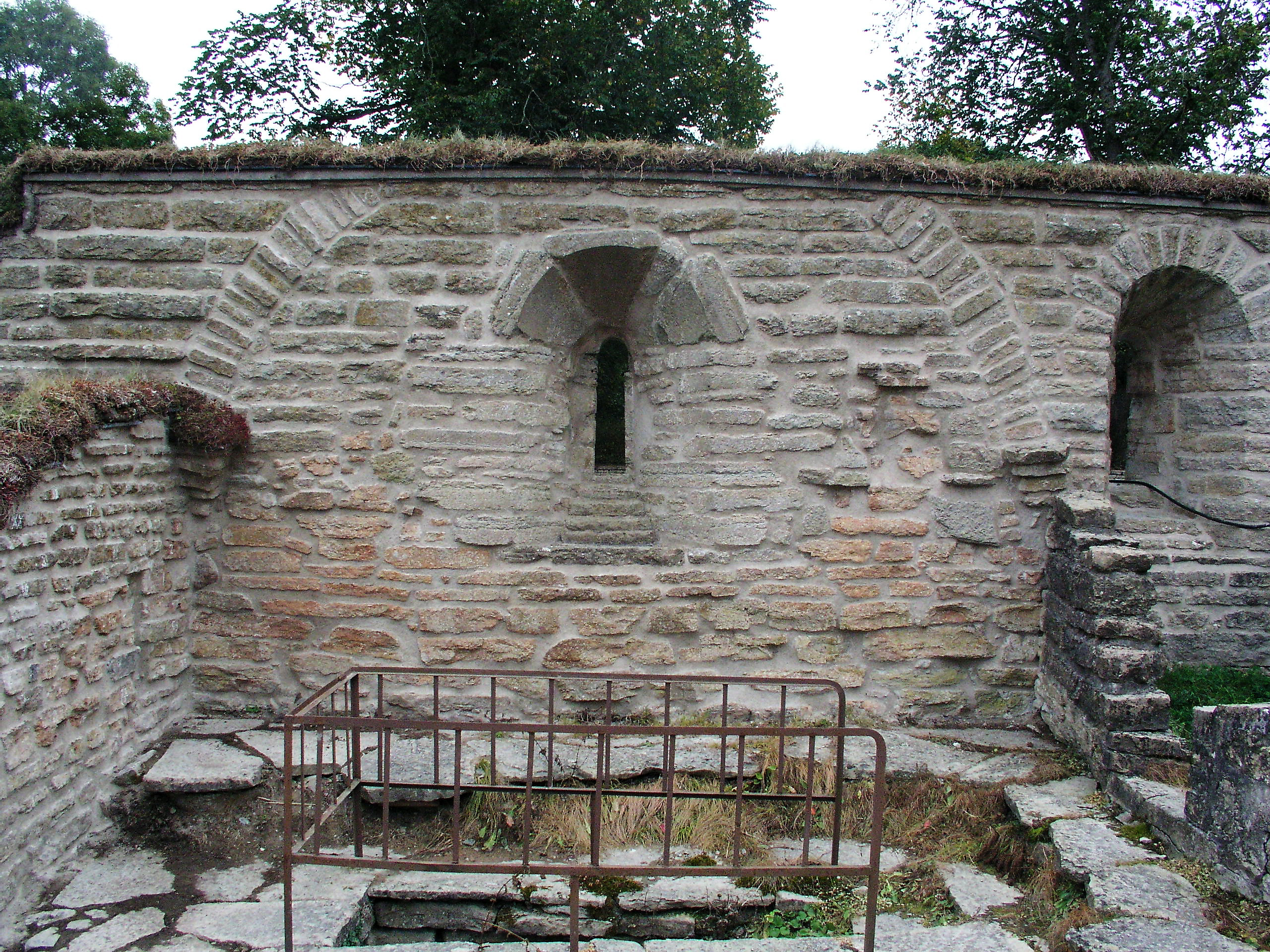
Restoration: day room with stairs to dormitory

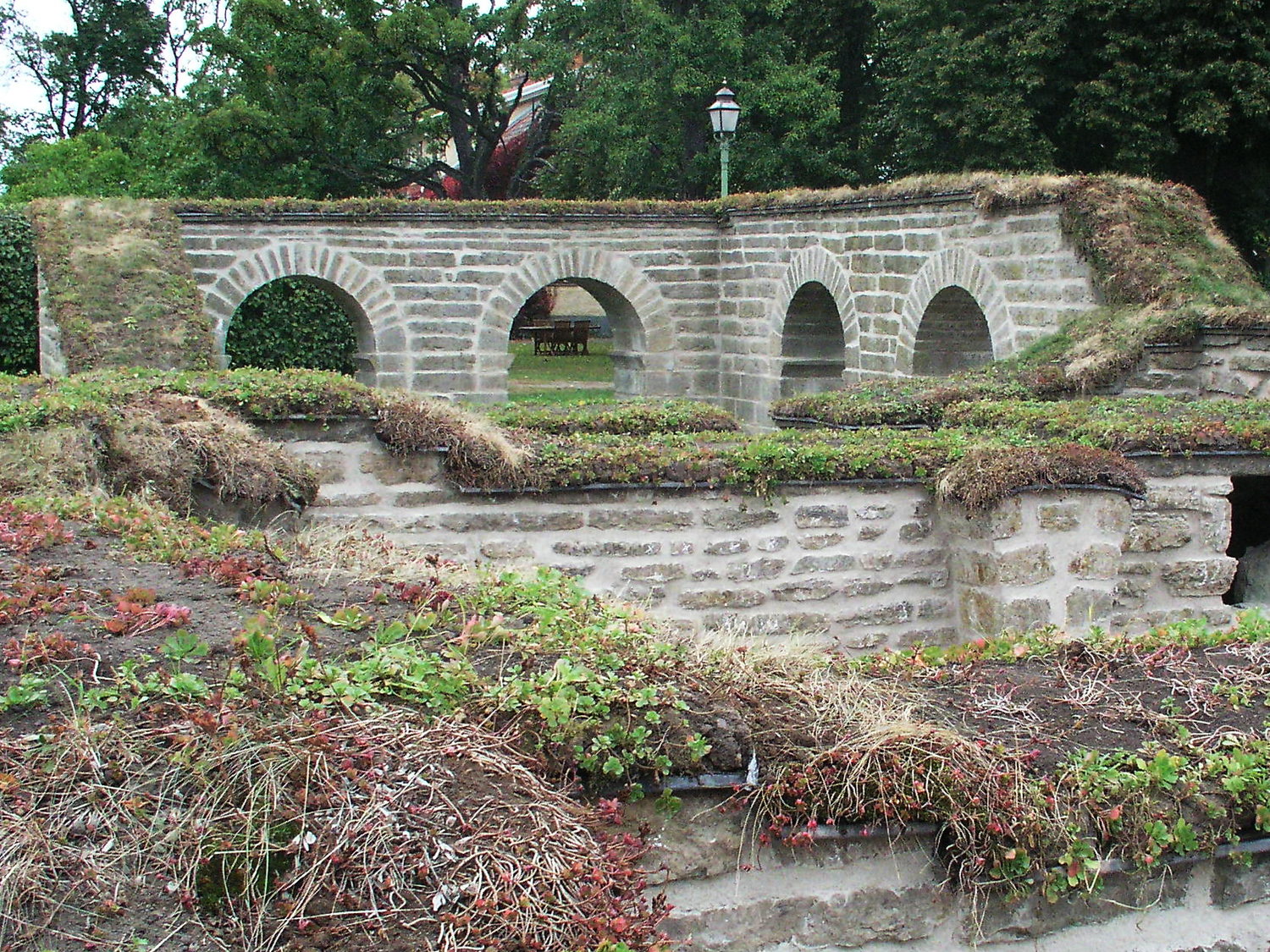
Restored walls
