= List of Swedish entrepreneurs =

This is a list of Swedish entrepreneurs and business people.

- Ola Ahlvarsson (born 1970), founder of Result
- David Axmark, co-founder of MySQL
- Percy Barnevik (born 1941), industry leader (ABB)
- Per-Ingvar Brånemark (1929–2014), osseointegration, titanium dental prostheses
- Gustaf Dalén (1869–1937), founder of AGA and Nobel Prize laureate
- Nils Ericson (1802–1860), railroad pioneer (SJ)
- John Ericsson (1803–1889), inventor and engineer (USS Monitor)
- Lars Magnus Ericsson (1846–1926), founder of Ericsson
- Joakim Fohlman, founder of Safer Uppsala County and the Foundation for Safer Sweden
- Assar Gabrielsson (1891–1962), industrialist, co-founder of Volvo
- Ellen Hodakova Larsson (fl. 2020s), founder of the clothing label Hodakova
- Bertil Hult (born 1941), businessman, founder of EF Education First
- Jonas af Jochnick (1937–2019), founder of Oriflame
- Kerstin af Jochnick (born 1958), banker
- Robert af Jochnick (born 1940), founder of Oriflame
- Johan Petter Johansson (1853–1943), inventor
- Ingvar Kamprad (1926–2018), founder of IKEA
- Bert Karlsson (born 1945), owner and manager of Mariann Grammofon AB
- Mathilda Hamilton (1864–1935), missionary and entrepreneur
- Ivar Kreuger (1880–1932), industrialist and financier
- Håkan Lans (born 1947), inventor
- Per E. Larsson, CEO and businessperson
- Gustav de Laval (1845–1913), founder of Alfa Laval
- Beatrice Lesslie (1890–1967), ran the Gothenburg clothing firm Konfektions AB Lesslie
- Birger Ljungström (1872–1948), engineer
- Fredrik Ljungström (1875–1964), industrialist
- Adolf H. Lundin (1932–2006), oil and mining entrepreneur
- Alfred Nobel (1833–1896), industrialist, instituted the Nobel Prizes
- Birger Nordholm (1897–1989), entrepreneur
- Erling Persson (1917–2002), founder of Hennes & Mauritz
- Markus Persson (born 1979), founder of Mojang AB, creator of Minecraft
- Johanna Petersson (1807–1899), pioneering businesswoman from Ödeshög
- Ruben Rausing (1895–1983), founder of Tetra Pak
- Carl Fredrik Sammeli (born 1971), entrepreneur, business developer
- Pär Olof Sandå (born 1965), entrepreneur, developer and stockbroker
- Lars Olsson Smith (1836–1913), spirits manufacturer
- Jessie Sommarström (born 1979), chef
- Johan Stael von Holstein, founder of Icon MediaLab
- Helena Stjernholm (born 1970), CEO of the financial firm Industrivärden
- Frans Suell (1744–1818), founder of Malmö harbour
- Johan Ullman (born 1953), working in ergonomy, occupational orthopedics
- Torsten Ullman
- Olof Wallenius (1902–1970)
- Axel Wenner-Gren, founder of Electrolux
- Jonas Wenström, industrialist
- Sven Wingquist (1876–1953), engineer, inventor, industrialist, co-founder of SKF
- Niklas Zennström, founder of KaZaA and Skype

== See also ==
- Confederation of Swedish Enterprise
- List of Swedish companies
- Stockholm Stock Exchange
