= Frederick Lundin =

American politician

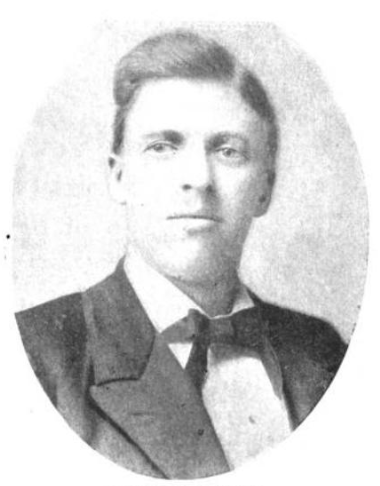

Member of the U.S. House of Representatives from Illinois's 7th district
- In office March 4, 1909 – March 3, 1911
- Preceded by: Philip Knopf
- Succeeded by: Frank Buchanan

Member of the Illinois Senate
- In office 1894–1898

Personal details
- Born: Fredrik Lundin Larsson; May 18, 1868 Hästholmen, Ödeshög Municipality, Sweden
- Died: August 20, 1947 (aged 79) Beverly Hills, California, U.S.
- Resting place: Forest Home Cemetery
- Party: Republican

Frederick Lundin (born Fredrik Lundin Larsson; May 18, 1868 – August 20, 1947) was a U.S. representative from Illinois and a Republican Party ward boss in Chicago. He played an instrumental role in the successful mayoral elections of William Hale Thompson and the creation of Thompson's patronage system. He also built up the organized syndicate later taken over by Al Capone in 1922.

== Background ==
Frederick Lundin was born Fredrik Lundin Larsson in the parish of Västra Tollstad, Hästholmen, Ödeshög Municipality, Östergötland County, Sweden. His parents were Lars Fredrik Lundin and Fredrika Larsdotter. He had two sisters, Lovisa (1854–1873) and Elin. He immigrated with his parents and sister when he was a child to the United States and settled in Chicago, Illinois, in 1880. After completing his academic studies, he served as president of Lundin & Co. manufacturer of Lundin's Juniper Ade, which was made from Juniper berry extract.

== Career ==
Lundin served as a member of the Illinois State Senate from 1894 to 1898. He was later selected to serve as an alternate delegate to the Republican National Convention from Illinois in 1904. In 1908 Lundin was elected as a Republican Congressman to the 61st United States Congress from Illinois' 7th congressional district in Near North Side, Chicago. He was a one-term congressman from March 4, 1909, until March 3, 1911, and was defeated for reelection in 1910. He resumed manufacturing interests and became involved as a Republican party ward boss in Chicago. Richard Norton Smith describes Lundin as:

A Lorimer protege esteemed for his organizational gifts and excused for his eccentricities ... For archaeologists of political roguery, he is the fossil evidence that democracy and flim-flaming go hand in hand. A man of many poses, Lundin referred to himself with contrived modesty as "the Poor Swede." Before entering politics, he had thrived as a patent medicine salesman peddling Juniper Ade, an all-purpose tonic concocted from juniper berries.

— Richard Norton Smith

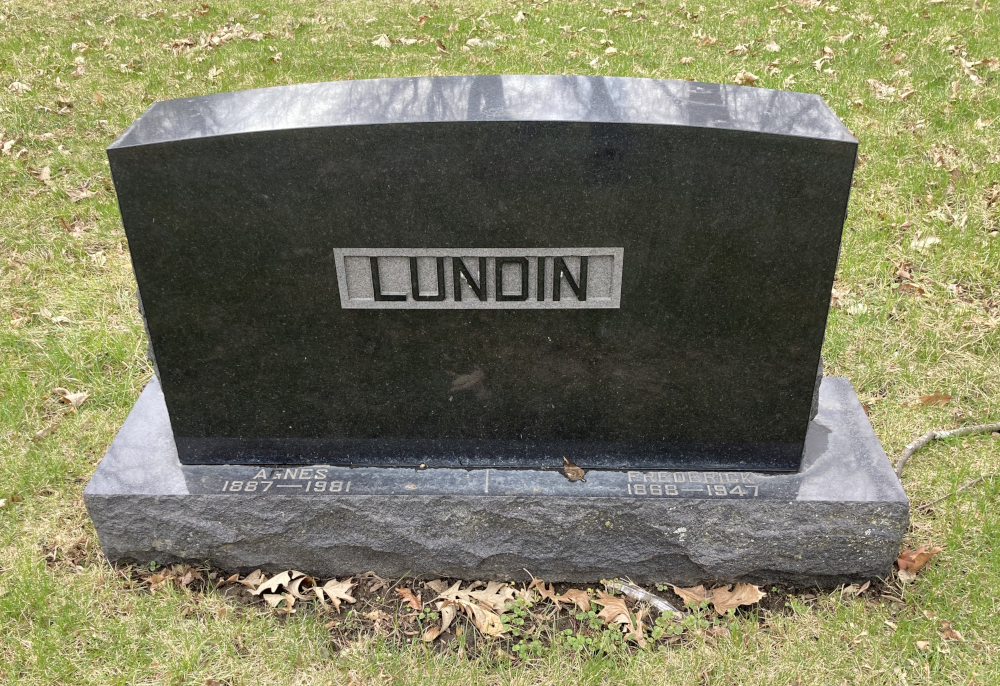
Lundin's grave at Forest Home Cemetery

In exchange for his supporters voting as he told them, Lundin arranged jobs mainly in the municipal sector. Lundin was instrumental in the election of William Hale Thompson as mayor in 1915 and succeeded in getting Thompson to appoint over 30,000 supporters to the city payroll in a form of political graft as all were required to kick back part of their pay to Lundin's organization. In 1922, Lundin was indicted on a charge of embezzling tax money. Although he was acquitted, this was the beginning of the end of his career as a political boss.

Lundin died in Beverly Hills, California, on August 20, 1947, and was interred in Forest Home Cemetery, Forest Park, Illinois.

== See also ==
- William Lorimer (politician)

== Bibliography ==
- United States Congress. "Frederick Lundin (id: L000515)". Biographical Directory of the United States Congress.

U.S. House of Representatives
Preceded by Philip Knopf	Member of the U.S. House of Representatives from Illinois's 7th congressional district 1909-1911	Succeeded by Frank Buchanan
