= Johanna Petersson =

Swedish businesswoman

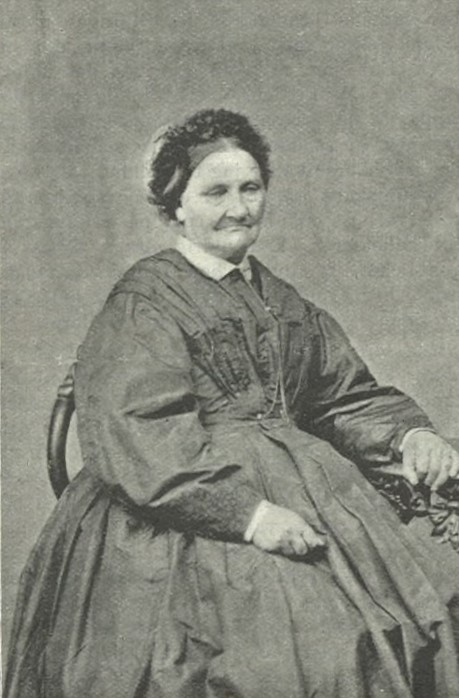
Johanna Petersson

Johanna Petersson or Peterson née Eriksson, commonly known as Handelsman Johanna ("Merchant-Johanna"), (1807–1899) was a Swedish businesswoman who contributed to the prosperity of Ödeshög in Östergötland. The shop she opened in the mid-1830s was so successful that she was able to buy several farms in the area. With her earnings, she transformed the village into a small town with cobbled streets, a pharmacy, and a nearby telegraph station. The bank crash of the 1870s brought her success to an abrupt end but she continued to run a small shop.

== Early life ==
Born on 30 October 1807 in Brodderyd, Ödeshög, in southern Sweden, Johanna Eriksson was the daughter of the judge Nils Eriksson and his wife Stina née Samuelsdotter. She was the second youngest of the family's six children. When 17, she married the farmhand Jonas Peterson with whom she had nine children.

== Business career ==
When they moved to a farm in Ödeshög, the village had only 200 inhabitants. Dissatisfied with life as a housewife, in the mid-1830s she opened a shop where she sold everything from silks to herbs and fish. She made extensive trips to Germany and Denmark, acquiring an even larger variety of goods. Business prospered and she soon became a central figure in the community. With her profits, she was able to buy and manage some 15 to 20 farms in the area. It is said she instructed her boys how to plough the fields, sometimes stepping down from her carriage to demonstrate the technique herself, clad as always in her dark silk clothes. She was able to extend the village, adding more streets, developing a cobbled market place and opening a pharmacy. She even arranged for a telegraph station to be constructed at nearby Hästholmen where she also developed a harbour.

Petersson's success came to an abrupt end with the financial crisis in the 1870s. But she did not give up completely. She continued to run a small shop as she grew older.

Johanna Petersson died in Ödeshög on 19 May 1899. She is buried in the local cemetery.

== Posthumous Reputation ==
In 1962, the county administrative board of Ödeshög decided that Johanna Peterson would have a block named after her, centrally in Ödeshög city center - an honor for her working there in the years 1824–1899. Her name and memory have in recent years attracted attention through "Hantverkshuset Johanna" a hand craft shop in central Ödeshög, "Johannastatyn" a wooden sculpture by artist Calle Örnemark, a mural in central Ödeshög that represents Johanna in her shop, "Johannamarken" a yearly market event arranged in July, and the annual nomination of "Johanna of the Year".

=== Hantverkshuset Johanna ===
In the summer of 1983, the local hand craft shop "Hantverkshuset Johanna" opened in the central parts of Ödeshög by idea makers Gunilla Norlen and Kerstin Elg. After about 10 years the shop was closed for financial reasons.

=== The Johanna statue ===
The Johanna statue was a 4-meter-high wooden sculpture by the artist Calle Örnemark, lent to Hantverkshuset Johanna. The statue of Johanna first stood at Hantverkshuset Johanna but was later moved to Hästholmen.

There were divided opinions about who was the owner and caretaker of the sculpture and unfortunately that lead to that the piece not receiving much needed maintenance. It was eventually in such poor condition that it was judged it could not be saved, and the statue was torched by Ödeshög municipality with consent by the artist.

=== Johannamarken ===
The yearly market event "Johannamarken" is one of the still surviving memories of Johanna Peterson. It is arranged annually during July in Ödeshög.

=== Johanna of the Year ===
Every year, the Ingeborg and Folke Lööf Memorial Fund nominate the “Johanna of the Year” in memory of Johanna Peterson. The badge of merit was established in 1984.

It is the wish of the foundation that the winning candidate of “Johanna of the Year” should be a role model for young women growing up in Ödeshög today. The candidates should be energetic, highly motivated, and enterprising in everyday life.

The winning candidate receives a medal of merit in the form of a piece of jewelry depicting Johanna Peterson handed out with a ceremony on June 6 in connection with the herring lunch in the square.
