= International Swede of the Year =

- Date: 1988
- Country: Sweden

International Swede of the Year (Swedish: Årets svensk i världen) is a prize awarded by the organization Swedes Worldwide (Swedish: Föreningen svenskar i världen).

== Winners ==
- 2025: Johan Rockström, Environmental scientist
- 2024: Armand Duplantis, pole vaulter, and Sarah Sjöström, swimmer
- 2023: Sweden’s war correspondents
- 2022: Zara Larsson, artist
- 2021: Mikael Dolsten, physician and Chief Scientific Officer at Pfizer
- 2020: Max Tegmark, physicist
- 2019: Cecilia Malmström, EU Commissioner
- 2018: Nina Stemme, opera singer
- 2017: Pia Sundhage, footballer
- 2016: Staffan de Mistura, diplomat
- 2015: Max Martin, music producer, songwriter
- 2014: Martin Lorentzon and Daniel Ek, IT entrepreneurs, creators of Spotify
- 2013: Zlatan Ibrahimović, footballer
- 2012: Hans Rosling of Gapminder Foundation
- 2011: Peter Wallenberg (1959-), businessman.
- 2010: Annika Sörenstam, golfer
- 2009: Hans Blix, diplomat and politician
- 2008: Anne Sofie von Otter, opera singer
- 2007: Hans Rausing, founder of Tetra Pak
- 2006: Bertil Hult, founder of EF Education
- 2005: Jan-Ove Waldner, table tennis champion
- 2004: Margot Wallström, EU Commissioner
- 2003: Jonas af Jochnick and Robert af Jochnick, entrepreneurs, founders of Oriflame
- 2002: Yngve Bergqvist, entrepreneur, founder of the Ice hotel at Jukkasjärvi
- 2001: Sven-Göran Eriksson, football coach
- 2000: Håkan Lans, inventor
- 1999: Benny Andersson and Björn Ulvaeus, composers and musicians
- 1998: Adolf H. Lundin, oil and mining entrepreneur
- 1997: Astrid Lindgren, author
- 1996: Peter Jablonski, pianist
- 1995: Agneta Nilsson, founder of the SWEA (Swedish Women's Educational Association)
- 1994: Torbjörn Lagerwall, professor
- 1993: Lars Gustafsson, member of the Swedish Academy author and professor
- 1992: Percy Barnevik, CEO of ABB Asea Brown Boveri
- 1991: Lennart Bernadotte and Sonja Bernadotte, founder of the Mainau museum.
- 1990: Pontus Hultén, professor
- 1989: Ingvar Kamprad, founder of IKEA
- 1988: Oscar Carlsson, missionary and inventor
