= Shumilin =

Shumilin (Russian: Шумилин) is a Russian masculine surname, its feminine counterpart is Shumilina. It may refer to

- Andrey Shumilin (born 1970), Russian wrestler
- Sergei Shumilin (born 1990), Russian football player

== See also ==
- Shumilina Raion in Vitebsk Region, Belarus
