= Obal (urban-type settlement) =

Obal Обаль (Belarusian) Оболь (Russian)
- Urban-type settlement
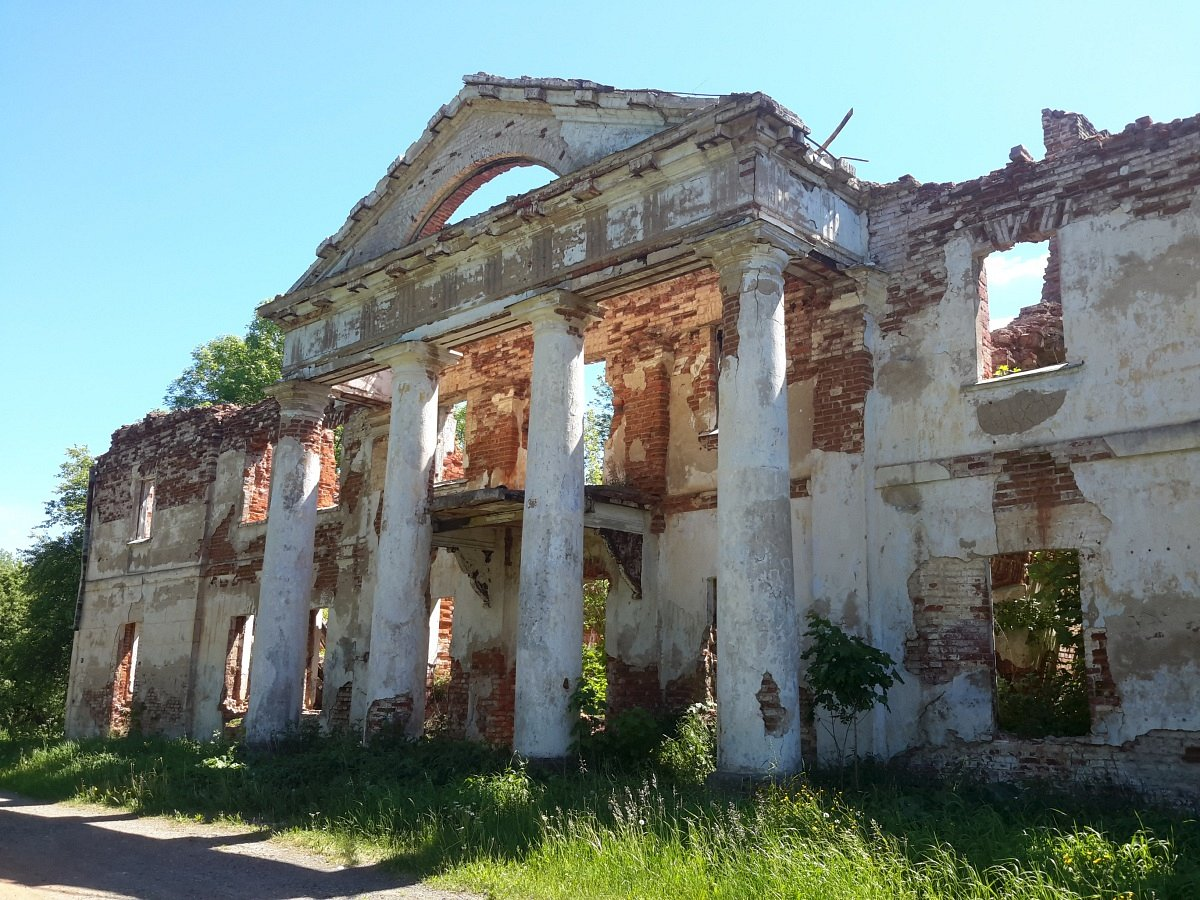
- Remains of Hrabnicki Palace, a cultural heritage monument of Belarus

- Location within Belarus
- Coordinates: 55°21′4″N 29°17′46″E
- Country: Belarus
- Region: Vitebsk Region
- District: Shumilina District
- Elevation: 150 m (490 ft)

Population (2024)
  - Total: 2,114
- Time zone: UTC+3 (MSK)
- Postal code: 222379
- Area code: +375 2130
- License plate: 2

Obal or Obol (Belarusian: Обаль; Russian: Оболь) is an urban-type settlement in Shumilina District, Vitebsk Region, Belarus. It is located 35 kilometres (22 mi) southeast of Polotsk. In 2024, it had a population of 2,114.

== History ==
Obal was known since the 16th century as a village in Połock Voivodeship within the Polish–Lithuanian Commonwealth. In 1772, following the Partitions of Poland, it became part of the Russian Empire. In 1866, the construction of the Riga-Oryol railway contributed to its growth.

During the Second World War, the settlement was under German military occupation from 8 July 1941 until June 1944. Prior to the German invasion, it had a Jewish population of several dozen people. About 10 or 15 Jews remained there at the start of the occupation, and they were placed in a local ghetto in late 1941. Several Jews died during the existence of the ghetto, which consisted of one house, and on 2 June 1942, the ghetto was liquidated, with the remaining six Jews being shot.

In 1968, the status of Obol was raised from village to urban-type settlement.

== Geography ==
Located in the center of Vitebsk Region, Obal lies between Vitebsk (64 kilometres (40 mi) southeast) and Polotsk (36 kilometres (22 mi) northwest), and is crossed by the Obal River. It is located 21 kilometres (13 mi) from Shumilina, 45 kilometres (28 mi) from Novopolotsk and 228 kilometres (142 mi) from Minsk. The town is served by the P20 highway and by the Smolensk-Vitebsk-Daugavpils-Riga railway.

== Notable people ==
- Zinaida Portnova (1926–1944), Russian partisan, Hero of the Soviet Union. In 1942 she joined the Belarusian resistance movement, becoming a member of the local underground Komsomol organization in Obal.

== Twin towns ==
- Ödeshög (Ödeshög Municipality, Sweden)

== Sources ==
- Megargee, Geoffrey P.; Dean, Martin (4 May 2012). The United States Holocaust Memorial Museum Encyclopedia of Camps and Ghettos, 1933 –1945: Volume II: Ghettos in German-Occupied Eastern Europe. Indiana University Press. p. 1709. ISBN 978-0-253-00202-0.
