= Alexander Bengtsson =

Swedish politician

Alexander Bengtsson (27 September 1995 - 24 March 2016) was a Swedish Moderate Party politician.

Bengtsson fought against racism and homophobia. Because of this, he received several death threats. On March 8, 2016, he claimed that he was attacked with a knife in his own home. After the suspected knife attack, he said he wanted to leave politics. However, he changed his mind. During a speech he said, "I will not let these Nazis win".

On 24 March 2016, one person was found in a burning car outside Ödeshög. According to the police, everything indicated that the deceased person was Bengtsson. DNA analysis confirmed three weeks later that the remains found in the car were indeed Bengtsson's. According to the police, nothing indicated that a crime had been committed.
