= Frank Buchanan =

Frank Buchanan may refer to:

- Frank Buchanan (Pennsylvania politician) (1902–1951), Democratic member of the U.S. House of Representatives from Pennsylvania
- Frank Buchanan (Illinois politician) (1862–1930), Democratic member of the U.S. House of Representatives from Illinois
- Franklin Buchanan (1800–1874), Naval officer in the United States Navy and Confederate States Navy
