= Anna Malmhake =

Swedish business executive (born 1966)

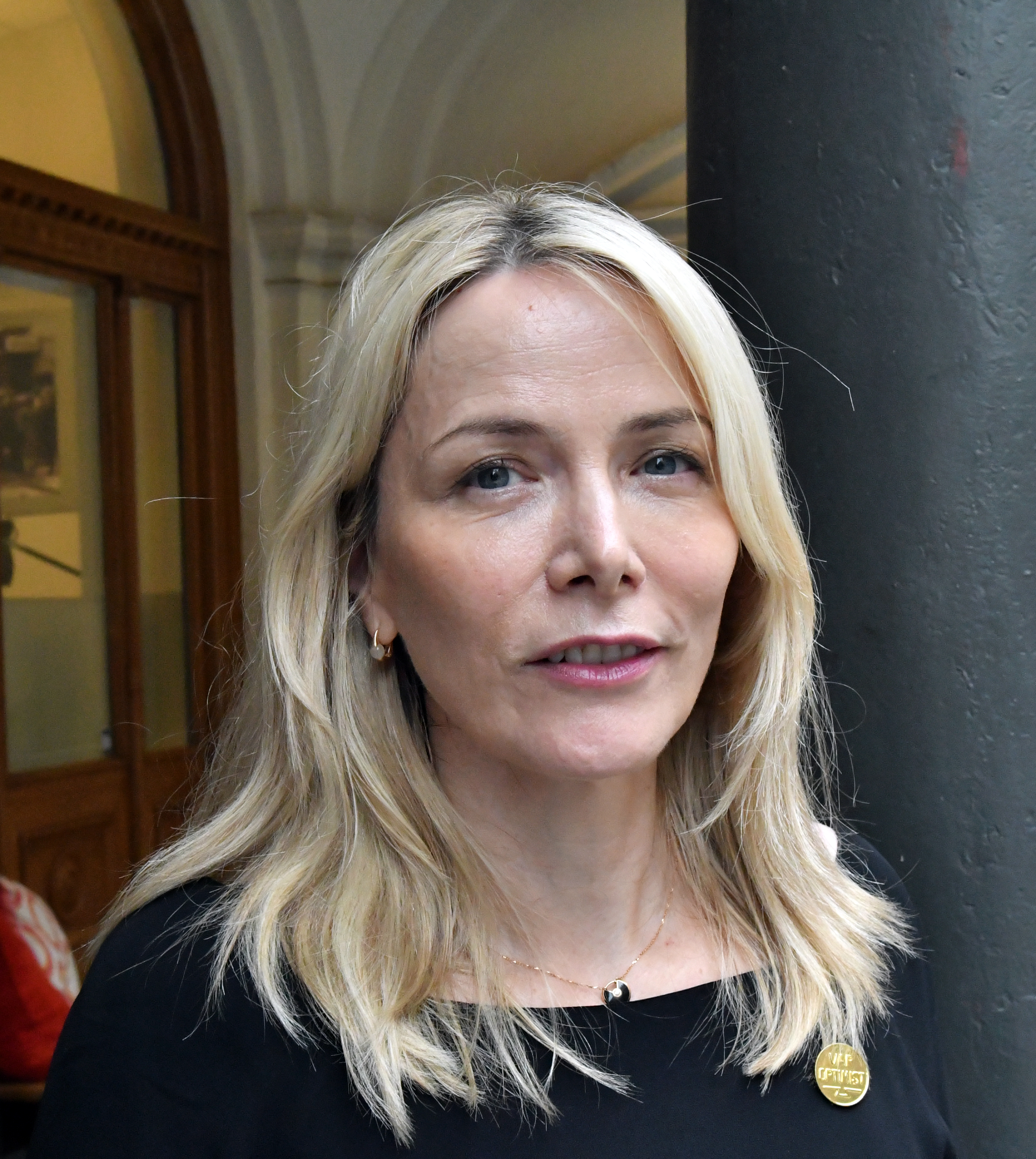
- Malmhake in 2018
- Born: Anna Malmhake; December 1966 (age 59); Nynäshamn, Sweden
- Education: Stockholm University
- Occupation: Business executive
- Title: CEO and President of Oriflame
- Children: 2

Anna Malmhake (born 1966) is a Swedish business executive specialised in fast-moving consumer goods and consumer technology. She is a graduate of Stockholm University, and holds a bachelor's degree in social science, business and law.

== Career ==
Malmhake started her career at Procter & Gamble in 1991. After positions at The Coca-Cola company and Motorola, she joined Vin & Sprit AB in 2007 as global brand director for Absolut Vodka. Soon after Pernod Ricard bought Vin & Sprit AB, Malmhake was promoted to vice president Global Marketing, a position she held until 2011.

Between 2011 and 2016, Malmhake was chairman and CEO of Irish Distillers, before returning to The Absolut Company as CEO on 1 July 2016.

She left The Absolut Company in 2020 to become managing director for the EMEA go to market organization of Activision Blizzard. She left Activision Blizzard King in early 2023.

In 2023, Malmhake became CEO & President of Oriflame.

On 14 August 2026, it was announced that she had decided to step down as CEO and President of Oriflame

== Boards and honors ==
Apart from having been the chairwoman of The Absolut Company, Malmhake has also been on the board of Oriflame. In 2015, she won the CEO Businesswoman of the Year Award from Image. In 2016 and 2017, Veckans Affärer listed Malmhake as one of Sweden's most powerful women of the media- and communications industry.

== Personal life ==
Malmhake has twin sons and lives in London, United Kingdom.
