= Magnus Brännström =

Swedish businessman

- Born: June 4, 1966 (age 59); Umeå, Sweden
- Education: Uppsala University, Harper College, International economics, Law, Russian
- Known for: Oriflame, CEO and President, Chairman of the World Federation of Direct Selling Associations (WFDSA)
- Height: 1.81 m (5 ft 11 in)
- Predecessor: Sven Mattsson
- Board member of: formerly member of boards: Oriflame Group, Walnut Bidco Plc., Walnut Midco Limited, Ferronordic AB
- Spouse: Maria Brännström
- Children: 3

Magnus Brännström (born June 4, 1966) served as the CEO and president and the board member of the beauty company Oriflame since 2006 until his departure from Oriflame in 2023. He became in 2017 the Chairman of the World Federation of Direct Selling Associations (WFDSA).

Brännström was one of few Swedish CEOs of his generation to have made his management career out of Russia. Before joining Oriflame's operations in Russia in 1996, Brännström worked for Swedish companies Spendrups, JGB and the former luxury hotell chain Reso entering the post-Soviet states of the early 90s. Brännström is a former Swedish navy reserve officer and combat diver.
