= Alvastra =

Village in Östergötland County, Sweden

Coordinates: 58°17′40″N 14°39′02″E

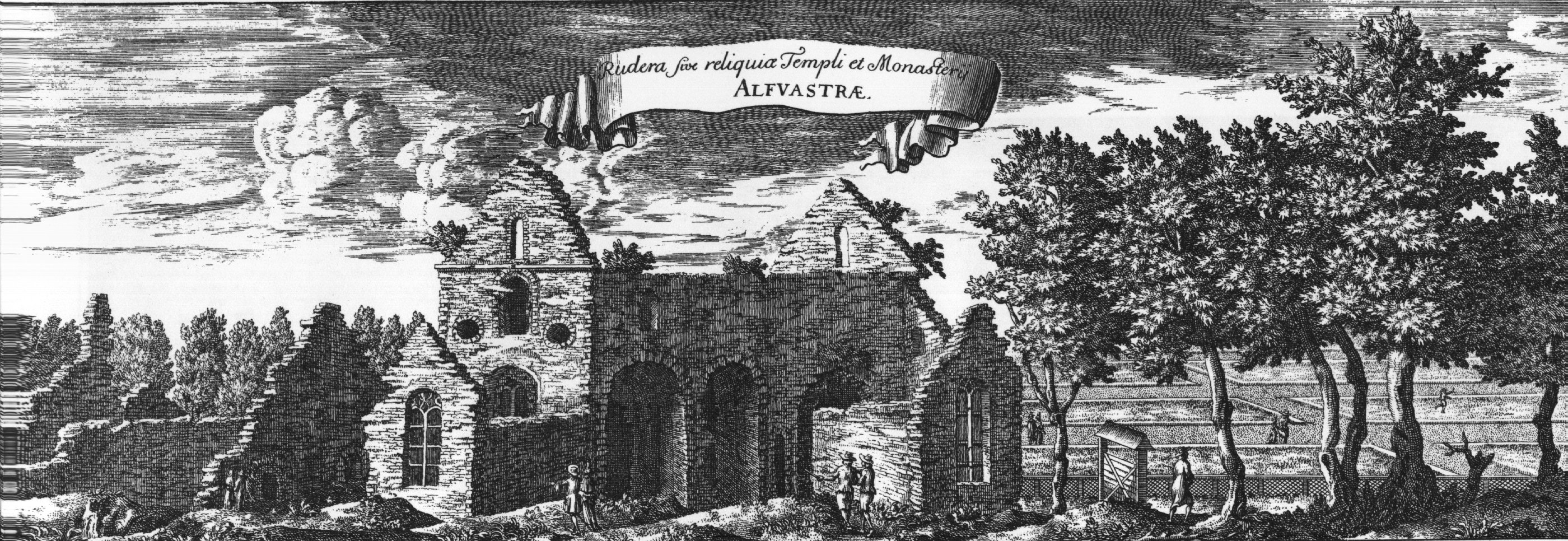
Alvastra as it looked in Suecia antiqua et hodierna, around 1700.

Alvastra (Swedish pronunciation: [ˈâlːˌvasːtra]) is a small village in Ödeshög Municipality in eastern Sweden. It is known for being the seat of the Cistercian Alvastra Abbey in the Middle Ages, established in 1143 by French monks. After the Reformation in Sweden in the 1530s, the monastery was demolished, never to be rebuilt.

The Alvastra monastery ruin is today well preserved and popular place to visit.

== See also ==
- Alvastra pile-dwelling
