= Shumilina district =

District of Vitebsk region, Belarus

Shumilina district Шумілінскі раён (Belarusian)
- District
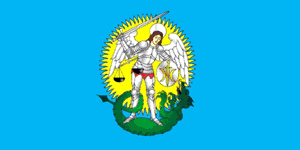
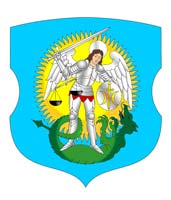
- Flag Coat of arms

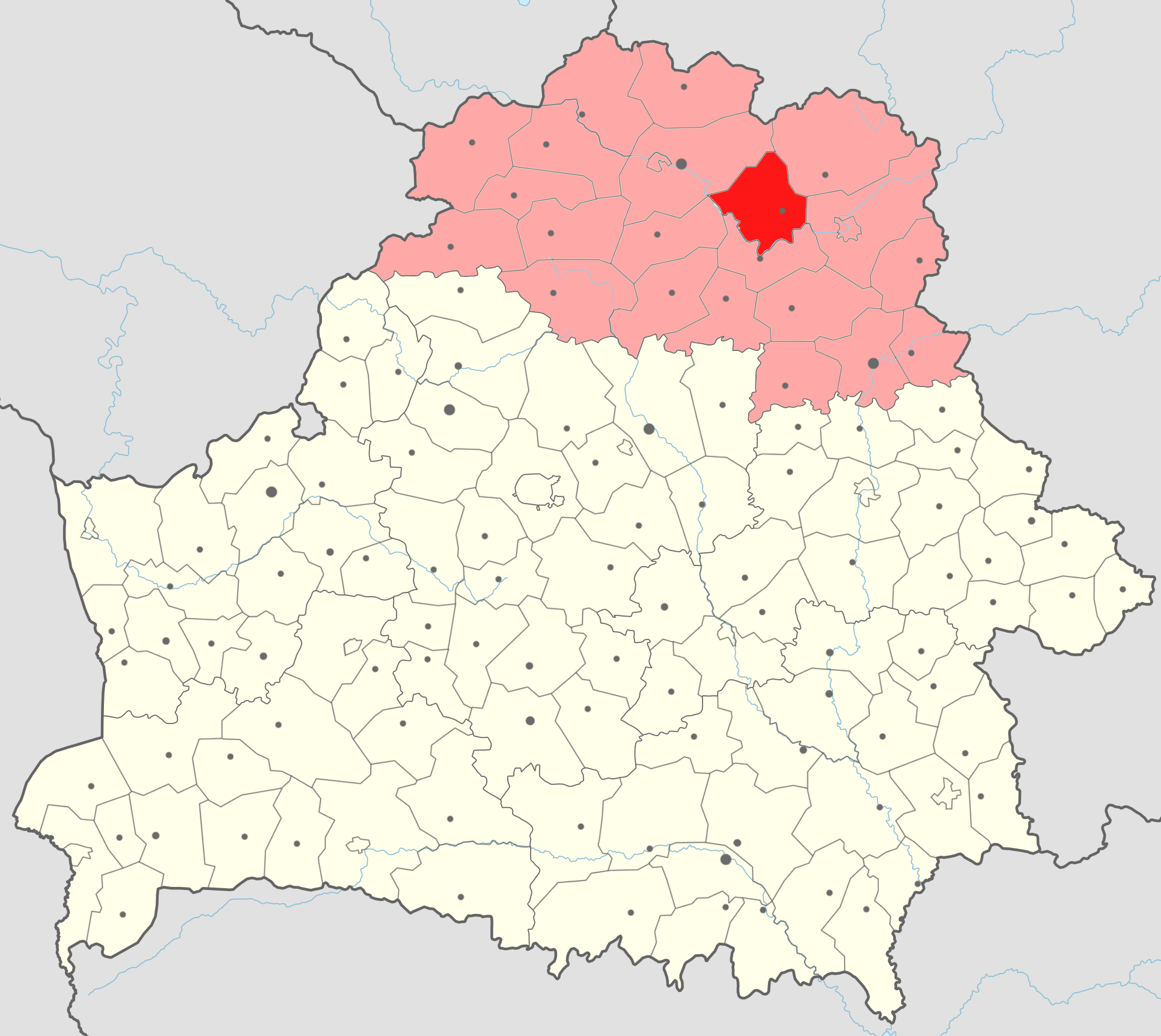
- Coordinates: 55°21′32″N 29°26′45″E
- Country: Belarus
- Region: Vitebsk region
- Administrative center: Shumilina

Area
  - Total: 1,695.40 km^{2} (654.60 sq mi)
- Elevation: 126 m (413 ft)

Population (2023)
  - Total: 16,418
  - Density: 9.6839/km^{2} (25.081/sq mi)
- Time zone: UTC+3 (MSK)

Shumilina district (Belarusian: Шумілінскі раён; Russian: Шумилинский район) is a district (raion) of Vitebsk region in Belarus. Its administrative center is the urban-type settlement of Shumilina. The other urban-type settlement within the district is Obal.
