= Per E. Larsson =

Swedish businessman

Per E. Larsson was head of the Sweden-based OM Group (now OMX) and served as a member of the board of Swedish Orc Software company before he became CEO of the Dubai International Financial Centre (DIFC) on 15 July 2006.

On 1 July 2008, Jeffery Singer (former NASDAQ senior vice president) was scheduled to replace Larsson as CEO of DIFX.
