= Frank Buchanan (Illinois politician) =

American politician (1862–1930)

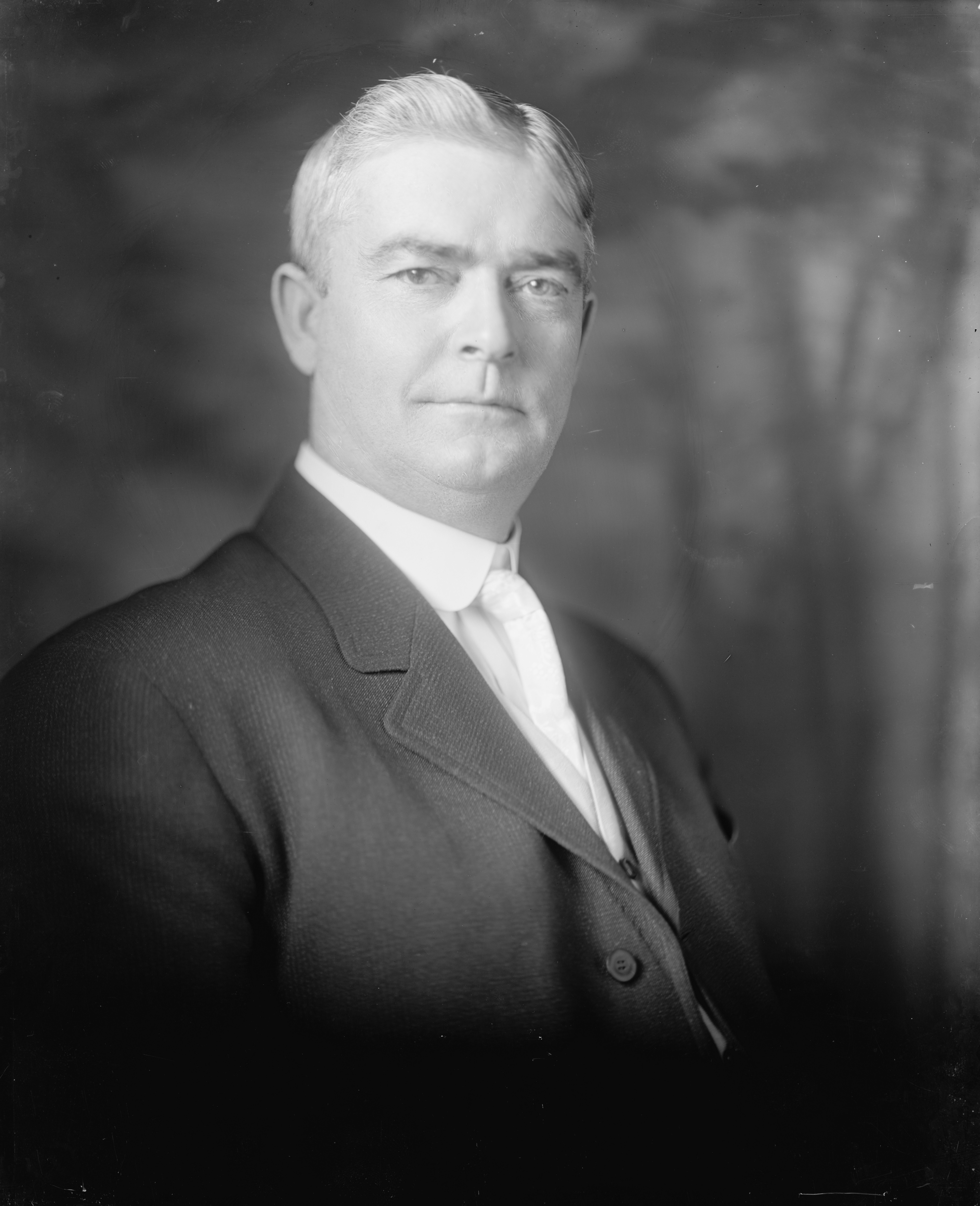

Member of the U.S. House of Representatives from Illinois's 7th district
- In office March 4, 1911 – March 3, 1917
- Preceded by: Frederick Lundin
- Succeeded by: Niels Juul

Personal details
- Born: June 14, 1862 Jefferson County, Indiana, U.S.
- Died: April 18, 1930 (aged 67) Chicago, Illinois, U.S.
- Resting place: Irving Park Boulevard Cemetery
- Party: Democratic

Frank Buchanan (June 14, 1862 – April 18, 1930) was a Democratic member of the United States House of Representatives from Illinois. He served in Congress for three terms from March 4, 1911, to March 3, 1917

== Biography ==
Buchanan was born in Jefferson County, Indiana near the town of Madison on June 14, 1862. He was a farmer and later a bridge builder. In 1901 he became president of the International Structural Iron Worker's Union. He ran unsuccessfully for Congress in 1906 and 1908. In 1910 he was finally elected, and served three terms, before losing a reelection bid in 1916.

After losing he returned to his career as an iron worker. Buchanan died in Chicago, Illinois on April 18, 1930. He was buried at Irving Park Boulevard Cemetery.

U.S. House of Representatives
Preceded by Frederick Lundin	Member of the U.S. House of Representatives from Illinois's 7th congressional district 1911-1917	Succeeded by Niels Juul
