= Mikael Dolsten =

Swedish-American doctor

Mikael Dolsten (born c. 1958) is a Swedish-American physician scientist. He previously served as the Chief Scientific Officer and President of Research and Development at Pfizer between 2009 and 2024.

== Early life ==
He was born in 1958 as Mikael Dohlsten to Jewish parents in the Halmstad Municipality on the Swedish west coast.

Dolsten attended Kattegattskolan in Halmstad, Sweden (Kattegattgymnasiet), a gymnasium secondary school in Halmstad, graduating in 1975. He grew up in Halmstad Municipality in the south-west of Sweden.

== Career ==
He studied medicine at Lund University where he trained as a physician and later earned a PhD in tumor immunology in 1988. Dolsten was appointed associate professor and adjunct professor of immunology at Lund University upon completion of his doctorate.

From 1988 to 1997, Dolsten worked at Pharmacia in Lund, where he later served as research manager. From 1997 to 2003 he worked for the Swedish pharmaceutical company Astra that became AstraZeneca as head of research & development for the subsidiary Astra Draco and after the Astra-Zeneca merger as head of Cardiovascular/Metabolic & Gastrointestinal research areas in April 1999, at Mölndal.

Dolsten was appointed December 2003 as worldwide head of research for the German pharmaceutical company Boehringer Ingelheim in 2003 with responsibility for its research activities in Germany, Austria, Italy, Japan and USA and served in this role until 2008.

He was appointed President of R&D at the American Pharma Wyeth 2008. Dolsten joined Pfizer in 2009 during the acquisition of Wyeth as Head of BioTherapeutics. He became Pfizer's Chief Scientific Officer and President of R&D on 26 May 2010, replacing Martin Mackay, who moved to the UK as head of research for AstraZeneca.

On 14 May 2014 he appeared, with two other Pfizer executives, in front of the Science and Technology Select Committee to answer questions. The day before, three Pfizer executives had been interviewed in front of the Business, Innovation and Skills Committee.

Dolsten served as scientific advisor to the Obama administration's task force for improving regulatory and drug development as well as the VP Biden led Cancer moonshot and the NCI Blue Ribbon Panel. He has been founding co-chair with NIH Director Francis Collins for the public private consortium AMP, Accelerating Medicine Partnership.

He is on an advisory board of the Pharmaceutical Research and Manufacturers of America, board member of Research America and board member of the public company Karyopharm Therapeutics in Boston.

Dolsten has been elected to the Royal Swedish Academy of Engineering Science.

Dolsten has been a subject of an antisemitic conspiracy theory that he and other Jewish people are part of a cabal responsible for COVID and a "COVID agenda".

After 15 year of service, Dolsen stepped down from his role as research and development chief at Pfizer in 2024. There had been more than 35 drug and vaccine approvals at Pfizer under Dolsen's tenure, including some notable therapies: Paxlovid (nirmatrelvir/ritonavir), Eliquis (apixaban), Ibrance (palbociclib), and Vyndaqel/Vyndamax (tafamidis). In March 2025, he joined the board of Immunai, an AI drug discovery and development company. In August 2025, he joined the board of Chai Discovery.

== Personal life ==
Mikael Dolsten is married to Dr. Catarina Dolsten and has three children.He met his wife at Lund University in Sweden.

== See also ==
- Sir Mene Pangalos of AstraZeneca
