= Shumilina, Belarus =

Urban-type settlement in Vitebsk Region, Belarus

Shumilina Шуміліна (Belarusian) Шумилино (Russian)
- Urban-type settlement
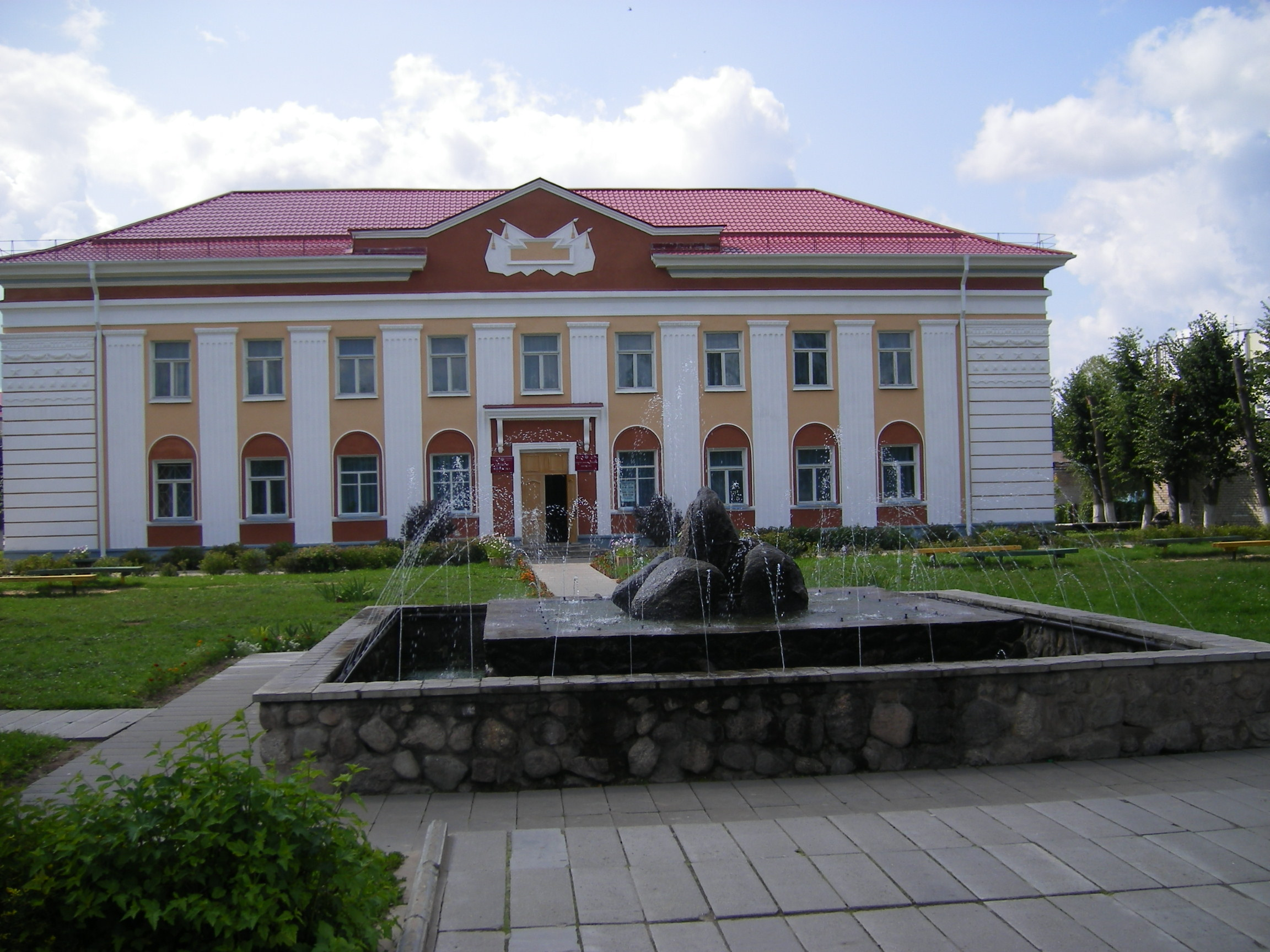

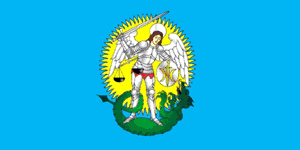
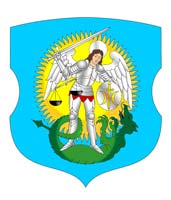
- Flag Coat of arms

- Location within Belarus
- Coordinates: 55°18′N 29°36′E
- Country: Belarus
- Region: Vitebsk Region
- District: Shumilina District

Population (2024)
  - Total: 7,223
- Time zone: UTC+3 (MSK)

Shumilina or Shumilino (Belarusian: Шуміліна, romanized: Šumilina; Russian: Шумилино) is an urban-type settlement in Shumilina District, Vitebsk Region, Belarus. It is located 40 kilometres (25 mi) northwest of Vitebsk. As of 2024, it has a population of 7,223.

== History ==
In 1939, 376 Jews lived in the town, making up 16% of the total population. After the German invasion of Poland, a significant population of Polish Jews came to the city. The city was under German occupation from 1941 to 1944.

The Jewish inhabitants were kept imprisoned in an enclosed ghetto in August 1941. The ghetto was liquidated on November 19, 1941, when the Germans and local police perpetrated a mass execution of around 300 Jews. After the shootings, witnesses recounted that the Jewish houses were plundered.

== Gallery ==
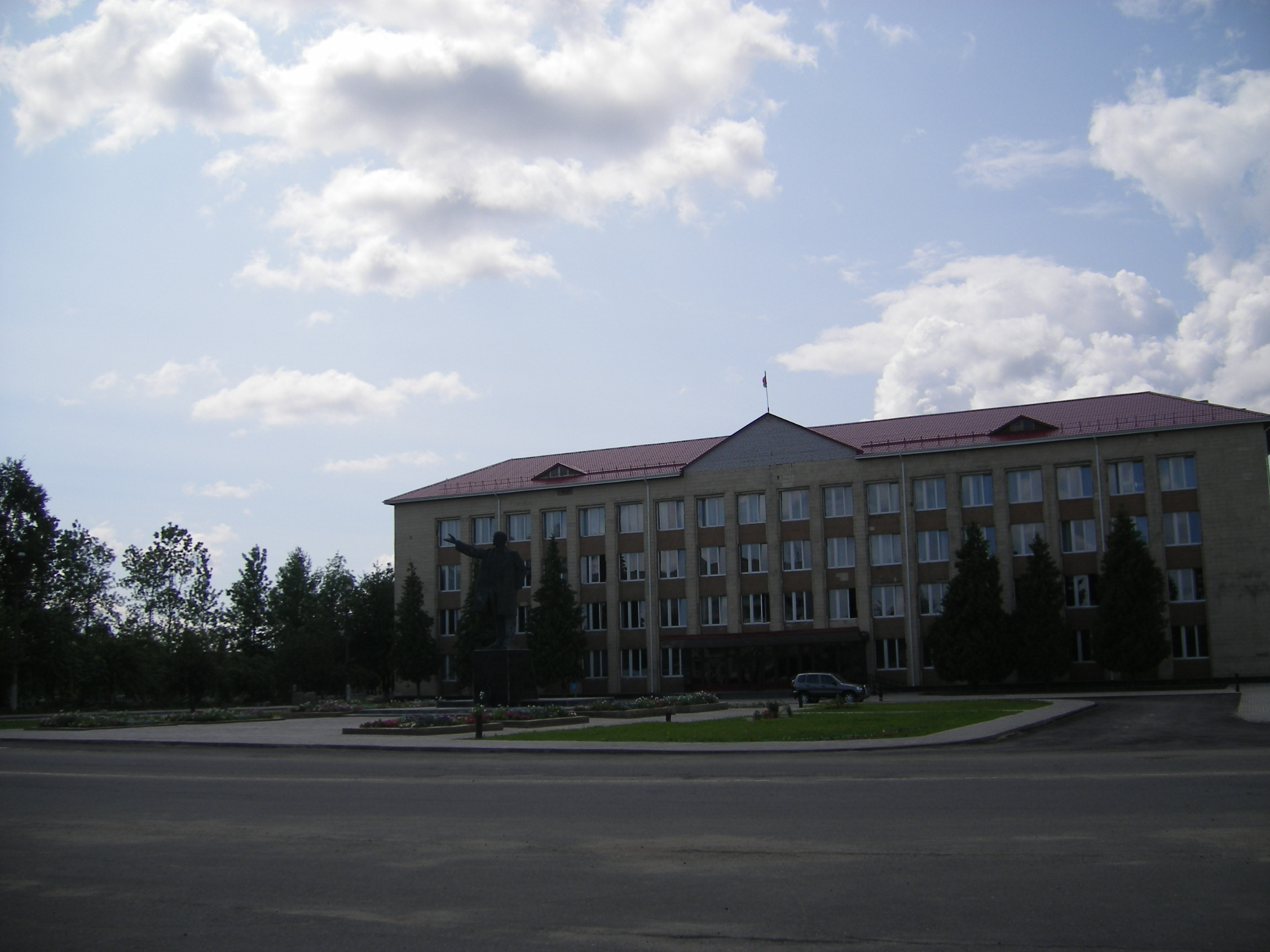
Library of the city

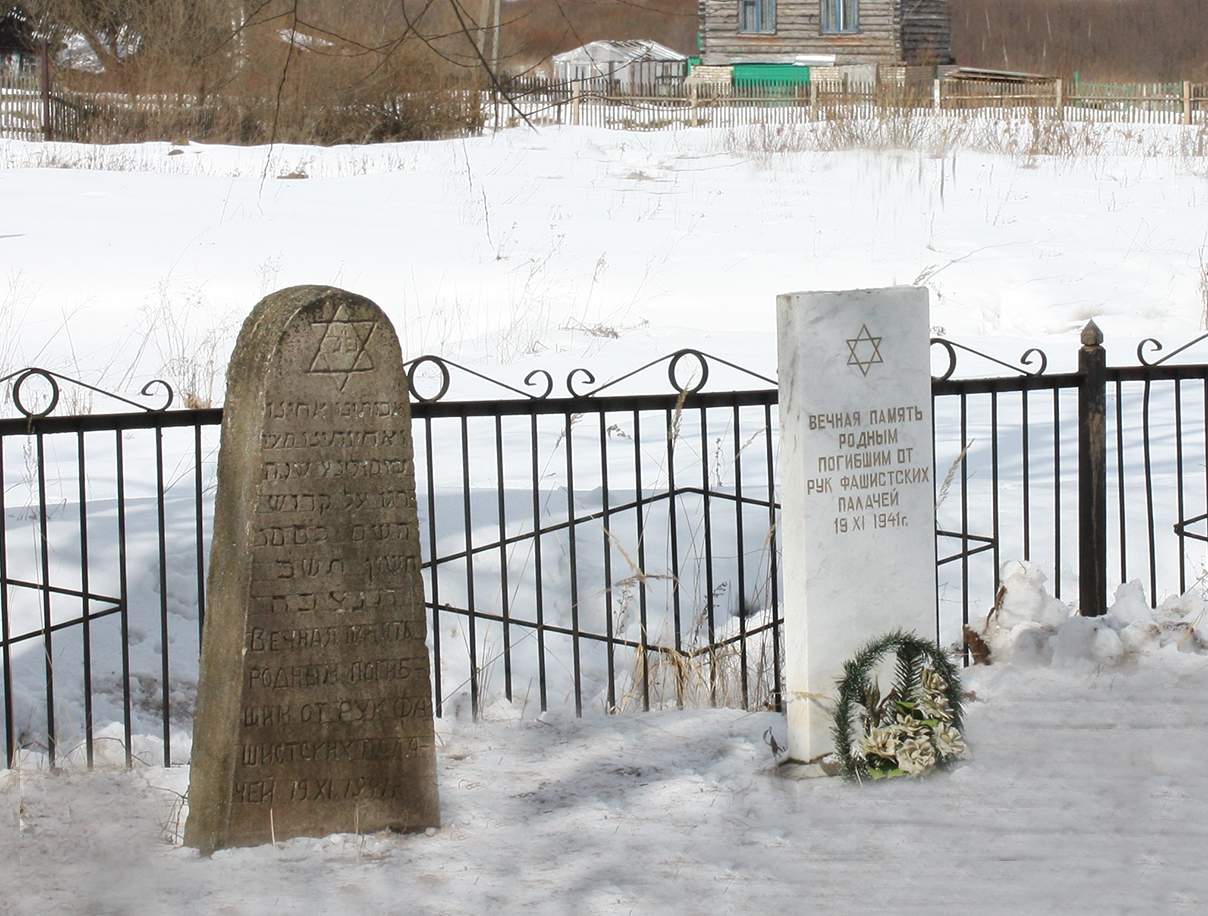
Memorial on the location of the massacre

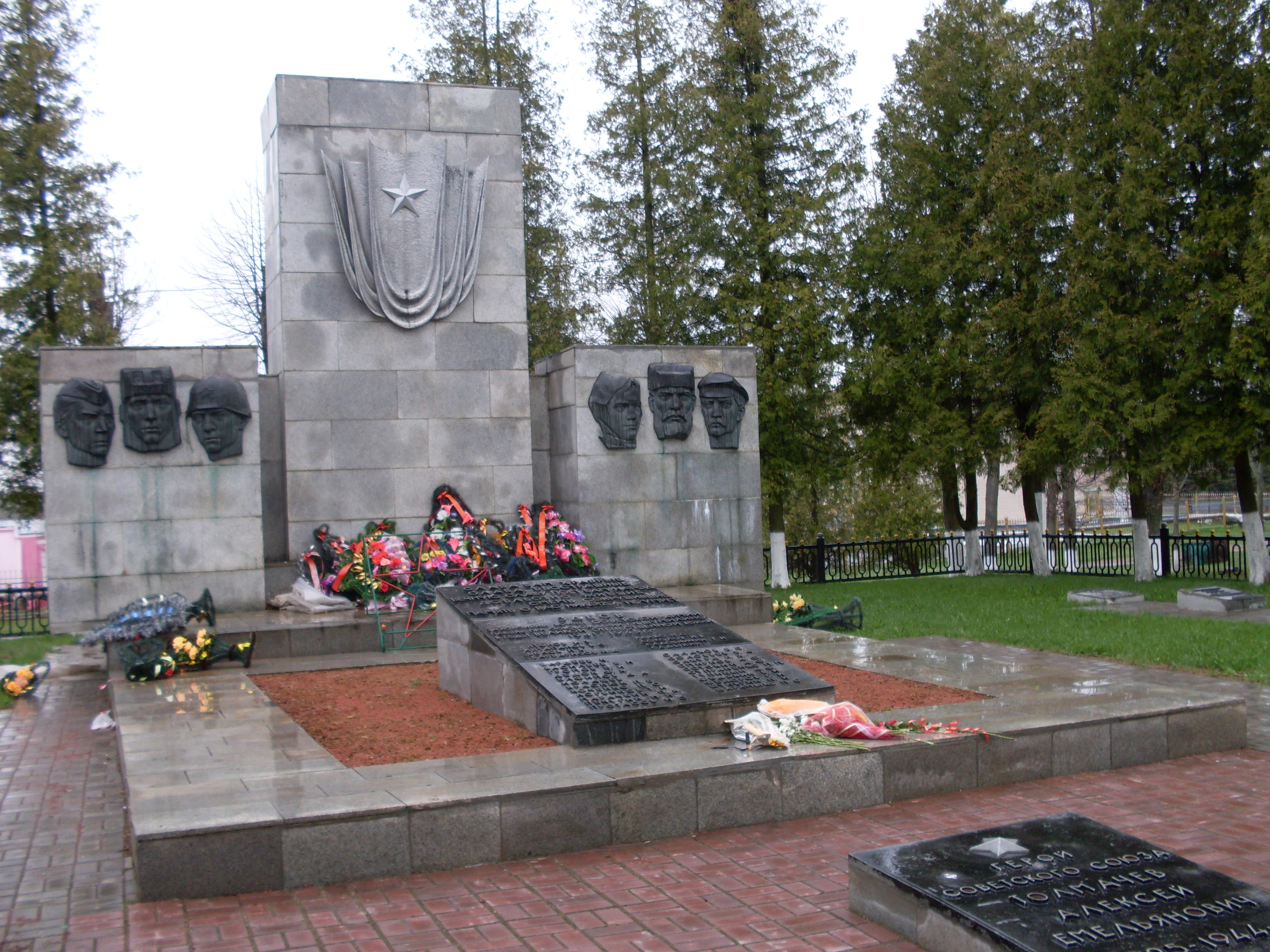
War memorial

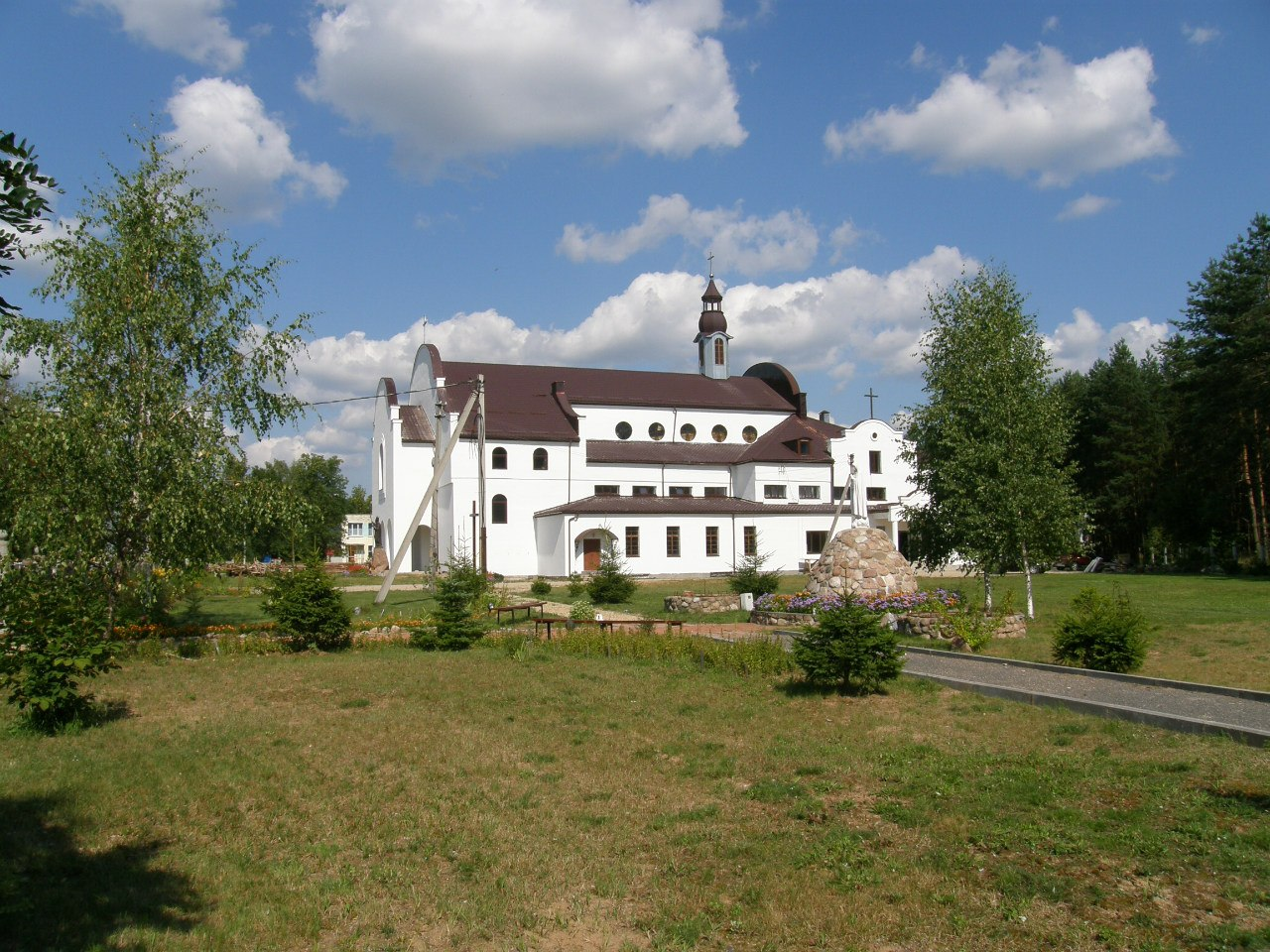
Our Lady of Fatima church
