= Ola Ahlvarsson =

Swedish entrepreneur

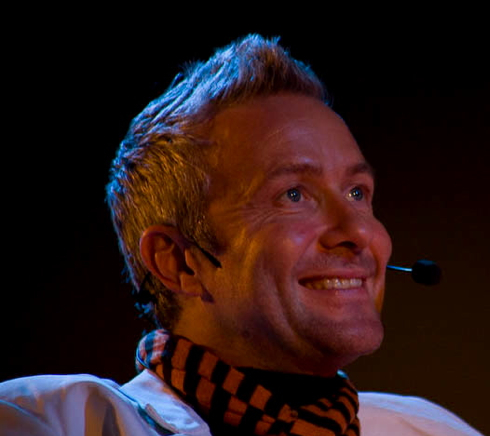
- Born: March 24, 1970 (age 55); Stockholm, Sweden
- Occupations: Entrepreneur, Author
- Website: Ahlvarsson.com

Ola Ahlvarsson (born March 24, 1970) is a Swedish entrepreneur and martial artist based in Stockholm, Ibiza and Miami. He is the founder or co-founder of several companies including Result, Starstable.com, Epicenter, Ahlvar Gallery and Villa Ahlvar.

Ahlvarsson has authored several books including Mission Possible (Midas, 2005), Silicon Valhalla (2016, co-authored with Mahesh Kumar), Mindchange (Fritanke förlag, 2024), later published in English by Aniara Publishing, and Happy Business (Aniara Publishing). He has spoken at international events including the World Economic Forum and DLD. He holds an MBA from Stockholm University and was course director and executive MBA Program faculty member at Stockholm School of Economics in Riga.

Ahlvarsson holds a World champion title in kickboxing (WAKO) and has competed in karate, taekwondo and kickboxing for more than 30 years, representing the Swedish national team in kickboxing through the 2025 World Championship in Abu Dhabi. He received the Great Athletes Award 2025 (Stora idrottares märke) from the Swedish martial arts federation.

== Public speaking ==
Ahlvarsson has spoken at conferences and industry events including the World Economic Forum, Le Web Paris, Singularity University, World Knowledge Forum in Seoul, DLD Munich, PICNIC Amsterdam, the "Global Internet Summit" and the "European Online Publishing Conference". He has been recognized as one of the best moderators on the international conference circuit by Professional Speaking, which highlighted his approach of active engagement with panelists rather than neutral facilitation. He is also the curator and host of SIME, a technology conference held in Stockholm since 1996.

== Awards and recognition ==
In 1999, Ahlvarsson was named one of the "Top Ten Leading European Internet Entrepreneurs" by The Wall Street Journal. He was profiled in similar features by BusinessWeek (January 2000) and Financial Times (May 2000).

Ahlvarsson has twice attended the World Economic Forum in Davos, where he was designated a "Global Leader for Tomorrow".

In 2004, he became an E-Strategies Course Director and Executive MBA Program lecturer at the Stockholm School of Economics in Riga.

== Entrepreneurial activities ==
=== Early ventures ===
Ahlvarsson was involved in several Swedish startups after leaving school, including Swedish Body Armour Group, Soups & Subs, Music Zone and Internet Media Web Store, as well as a real estate investment in Bollnäs, Sweden.

In 1997, Ahlvarsson was a co-founder of Boxman, an early European e-commerce company selling CDs online. Boxman was founded by two teams of entrepreneurs: one with roots in Musiczone.se, including Fredrik Sidfalk, Ahlvarsson and Gustaf Burström, and the other from Videobutiken, led by Krister Hanner, Kent Granat, Bill Odqvist and Håkan Damberg. The company was backed by, among others, former SAS CEO Jan Carlzon and Kjell Spångberg. Ahlvarsson served as Vice President International, overseeing the company's expansion into European markets.

During his time at Boxman, Ahlvarsson developed the concept of a service company that could help businesses expand from one market to another by acting as an extension of their management team — an approach he compared to how music labels supported artists in the record industry. This concept became the basis for Result.

=== Result ===
In June 1999, Ahlvarsson co-founded Result in Stockholm, an international business coaching firm that assists companies with market launches and international expansion. As group CEO, Ahlvarsson also worked as an Internet strategist and managerial advisor for Fortune 500 and mid-sized companies. Result has been involved in approximately 200 company launches across Europe, the US and Asia. He served as CEO from June 1999 to November 2008.

In 2005, Ahlvarsson assisted in the launch of Fon into Scandinavia and Russia. Through Result, Ahlvarsson and partners were involved in the growth of the professional network XING (formerly openBC) in Scandinavia, Benelux, France and Spain. He also worked with companies including Blocket, Rebtel, Movilisto, Polarrose and Google in various advisory capacities.

=== Keynote Media Group ===
Ahlvarsson and partners acquired Nöjesguiden, a Swedish entertainment magazine. He also co-founded Sellbranch with advertising executive Fredrik Sellgren to build a yield management advertising platform.

In 2008, Ahlvarsson and three Result partners acquired 100% of the shares in Spray (formerly Lycos), a Swedish web portal that included Spraydate, a dating site, and Spraymail, an independent email service. They also acquired Passagen, a blog portal and discussion forum. The sellers were media house Allers and directories company Eniro.

These properties, along with Nöjesguiden and Sellbranch, were consolidated into Keynote Media Group. During 2013 and 2014, the group's properties were sold: Spraydate was acquired by Match.com, Spray was sold to Snowfall in 2014, Nöjesguiden was acquired by its investors and management in 2013, and a majority stake in Sellbranch was acquired by Swiss company Publi Grouppe.

Ahlvarsson was also chairman and main shareholder of Torget, a Swedish e-commerce portal with over 400 partners, until its sale to European Directories in 2005, and chairman and main shareholder of Letsbuyit.com until its sale to Europe Vision in 2006.

=== Ahlvar Gallery ===
Ahlvar Gallery was co-founded by Ahlvarsson and Swedish designer Frida Ahlvarsson, his then wife, combining her design background with his entrepreneurial experience. Following the couple's separation in 2021, Frida Ahlvarsson became sole owner of the company.

=== Starstable ===
Ahlvarsson is a co-founder of Star Stable Entertainment, founded in 2010 together with Johan Edfeldt, the developer of Star Stable, a massively multiplayer online game focused on horse riding and adventure with players across Europe, the Americas and Australia.

=== Epicenter ===
Epicenter is a Nordic innovation hub co-founded by Ahlvarsson and others in 2014, operating in Stockholm, Oslo and Helsinki. The organization offers coworking spaces ranging from desk memberships to private offices, and hosts community events, advisory services, coaching, and accelerator programs for startups and scale-ups. Epicenter facilitates industry clusters in areas including AI, longevity, sustainable food systems and real estate, and reports a membership of over 6,000 across its three locations.

=== Villa Ahlvar ===
Villa Ahlvar is a vacation rental company founded by Ahlvarsson, offering properties in locations including Mykonos, Ibiza, Miami and Stockholm.

=== Mindchange Universe ===
In 2024, Ahlvarsson published Mindchange: The Art of Thinking, Feeling and Living Well (Fritanke förlag), later released in English by Aniara Publishing. The book forms part of a broader initiative called Mindchange Universe, focused on mental health and personal development.

== Martial arts ==
Ahlvarsson has competed in martial arts for more than 30 years across karate, taekwondo and kickboxing. He holds an 8th degree black belt in karate. Early competitive results include a gold medal in Goju Ryu karate at the 1991 World Championships in Naha, Okinawa, the Goju Ryu European Championship in 1994 in England, a Swedish championship in kung fu in 1996, a Swedish kickboxing championship in 1996,a world championship in kickboxing (WAKO) in 1997 in Dubrovnik, and a bronze medal in ITF Taekwon-Do in Leicester 1991 (TAGB).

From 2011 to 2018, Ahlvarsson returned to competition, winning gold, silver and three bronze medals at the Swedish Taekwondo championships and representing Sweden at two European and one World championship. He also won a silver medal at the Swedish karate championships, his first karate competition in over 20 years. In 2018 and 2021, he won Swedish championships in All Style fighting (stand-up mixed martial arts).

Following hip surgeries in 2022–2023, Ahlvarsson resumed competing and won at several WAKO events, including the Top Ten Tampere Open 2024, the World Cup in Istanbul, and European and World championships in the 40+ age category. In 2025, he was selected for the Swedish national kickboxing team and won silver at the WAKO European championships in Athens. He won silver at the Swedish kickboxing championships in the senior (18+) category and bronze at the WAKO World Championships in Abu Dhabi. He was awarded the Great Athletes Award (Stora idrottares märke) by the Swedish martial arts federation (Svenska Budo och Kampsportsförbundet) for his career in competitive martial arts.
