= Robert af Jochnick =

Swedish businessman

- Born: 1940 (age 84–85); Sweden
- Occupation(s): Businessman: Cosmetics

Robert af Jochnick (born 1940) is a Swedish businessman, most notable for co-founding Oriflame Cosmetics with his brother Jonas af Jochnick in 1967 in Sweden. In 2003 the brothers shared the International Swede of the Year award. As of 2006, Robert af Jochnick was Sweden's 34th wealthiest person as estimated by business magazine Veckans Affärer.

== See also ==
- List of multi-level marketing companies
