= Ödeshög Municipality =

Ödeshög Municipality Ödeshögs kommun
- Municipality
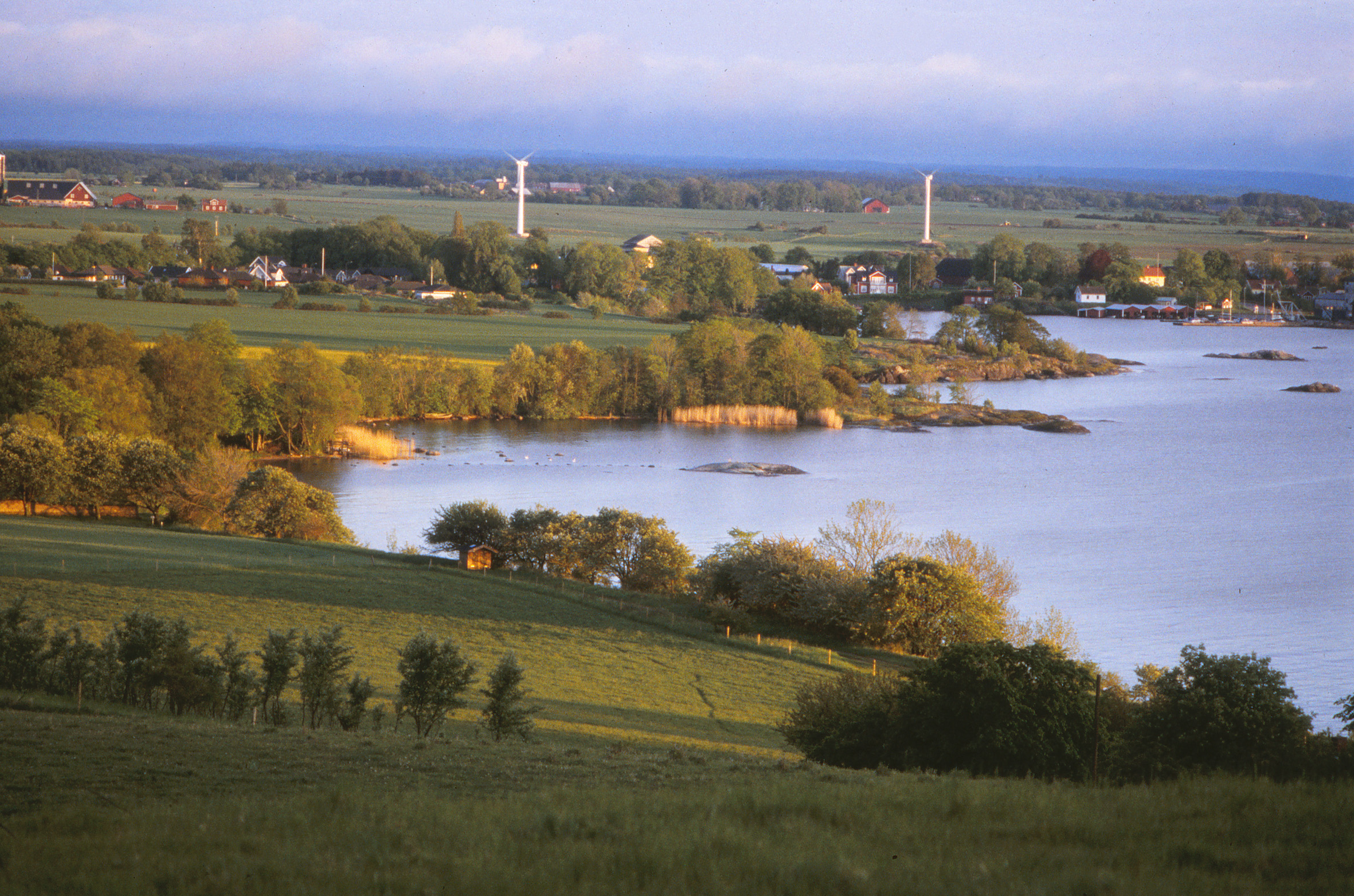

- Coat of arms

- Coordinates: 58°13′N 14°39′E
- Country: Sweden
- County: Östergötland County
- Seat: Ödeshög

Area
  - Total: 668.99 km^{2} (258.30 sq mi)
  - Land: 430.42 km^{2} (166.19 sq mi)
  - Water: 238.57 km^{2} (92.11 sq mi)
- Area as of 1 January 2014.

Population (30 June 2025)
  - Total: 5,241
  - Density: 12.18/km^{2} (31.54/sq mi)
- Time zone: UTC+1 (CET)
  - Summer (DST): UTC+2 (CEST)
- ISO 3166 code: SE
- Province: Östergötland
- Municipal code: 0509
- Website: www.odeshog.se

Ödeshög Municipality (Swedish: Ödeshögs kommun) is a municipality in Östergötland County, Sweden. The seat is situated in the small town of Ödeshög.

The coat of arms was created in 1972 at the time the modern municipalities of Sweden were created. It mainly represents the medieval monastery of Alvastra: An abbacy staff, a rising moon (historically representing the Virgin Mary), and a six-pointed star (representing a higher deity).

== Nature ==
A large part of the municipality borders lake Vättern. There is a small harbour.

There are two nature reserves within the municipal borders: Isberga with a distinguished steppe meadow flora , and Kråkeryd located on rocks above Vättern at 60 meters altitude. Kråkeryd has a geology rich in lime, and the uncultivated rocky terrain is the location for several unusual flowers and plants .

== Localities ==
There are two urban areas (also called a Tätort or locality) in Ödeshög Municipality.

In the table the localities are listed according to the size of the population as of December 31, 2005. The municipal seat is in bold characters.

#	Locality	Population
1	**Ödeshög**	2,651
2	Hästholmen	372

== Demographics ==
This is a demographic table based on Ödeshög Municipality's electoral districts in the 2022 Swedish general election sourced from SVT's election platform, in turn taken from SCB official statistics.

In total there were 5,303 residents, including 4,109 Swedish citizens of voting age. 38.8% voted for the left coalition and 59.5% for the right coalition. Indicators are in percentage points except population totals and income.

Location	Residents	Citizen adults	Left vote	Right vote	Employed	Swedish parents	Foreign heritage	Income SEK	Degree
Location			%	%					
Alvastra	1,225	986	37.3	60.6	84	92	8	25,548	34
Fridtjuv Berg	1,680	1,258	39.8	58.2	78	78	22	21,472	25
Holaveden	774	638	37.1	61.8	84	93	7	23,025	31
Lysing	1,624	1,227	38.9	59.6	86	87	13	22,772	24
Source: SVT

== Sights ==
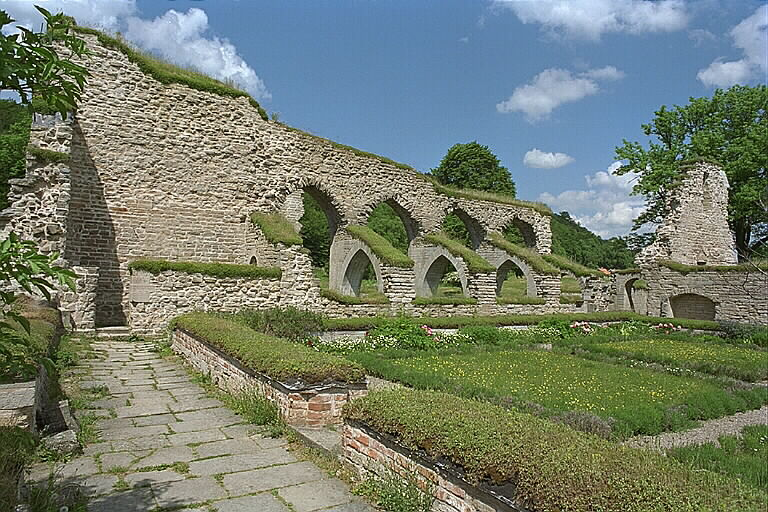
Alvastra kloster.

Within the borders of the municipalities lies the monastery of Alvastra. One of the world's most famous runestones, the Rök runestone, is also situated within the municipal borders.

There are also other ancient remains: the two hillforts Borgberget and Hjässaborgen. Both are open for visits although not much remains, and both are somewhat difficult to access. The municipality also contains burial grounds, etc.

Besides the monastery of Alvastra, there are seven other notable churches, several of which have a medieval foundation. Noteworthy are: Rök Church from 1845 (outside which stands the Rök runestone), Stora Åby Church, from the 1750s, with several older artifacts (baptismal font, triptych), and Ödeshögs Church with a medieval foundation.

In Eketorp, an ancient Thor's hammer amulet was found.

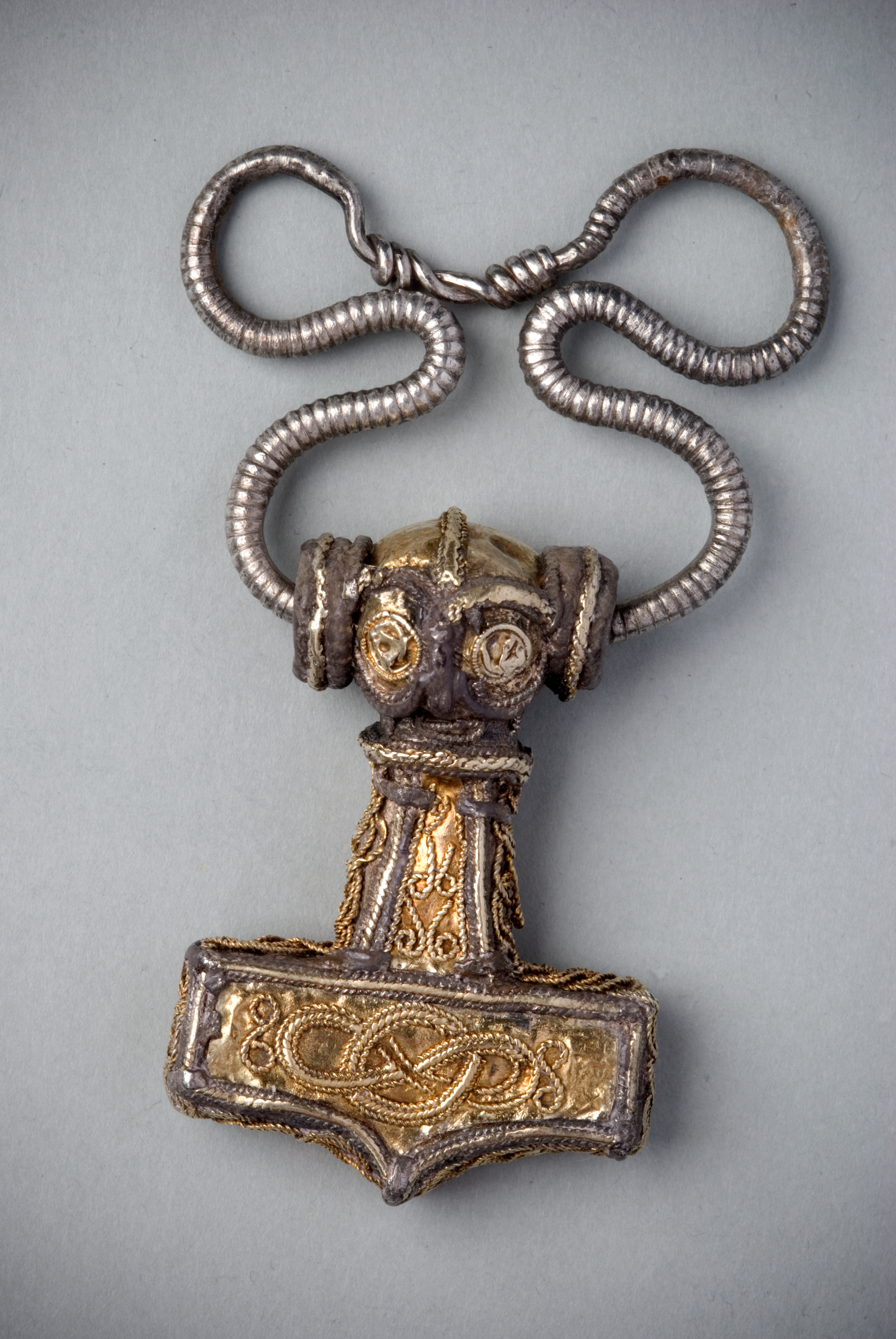
Thor's hammer found in Eketorp, Ödeshög parish.

== Famous citizens ==
- Klas Ingesson, former Sheffield Wednesday and PSV Eindhoven footballer
- Helen Svensson Fletre (1909–1987), American author and journalist

== Twin towns ==
- Obal, Belarus
