= Calle Örnemark =

Swedish artist and sculptor (1933–2015)

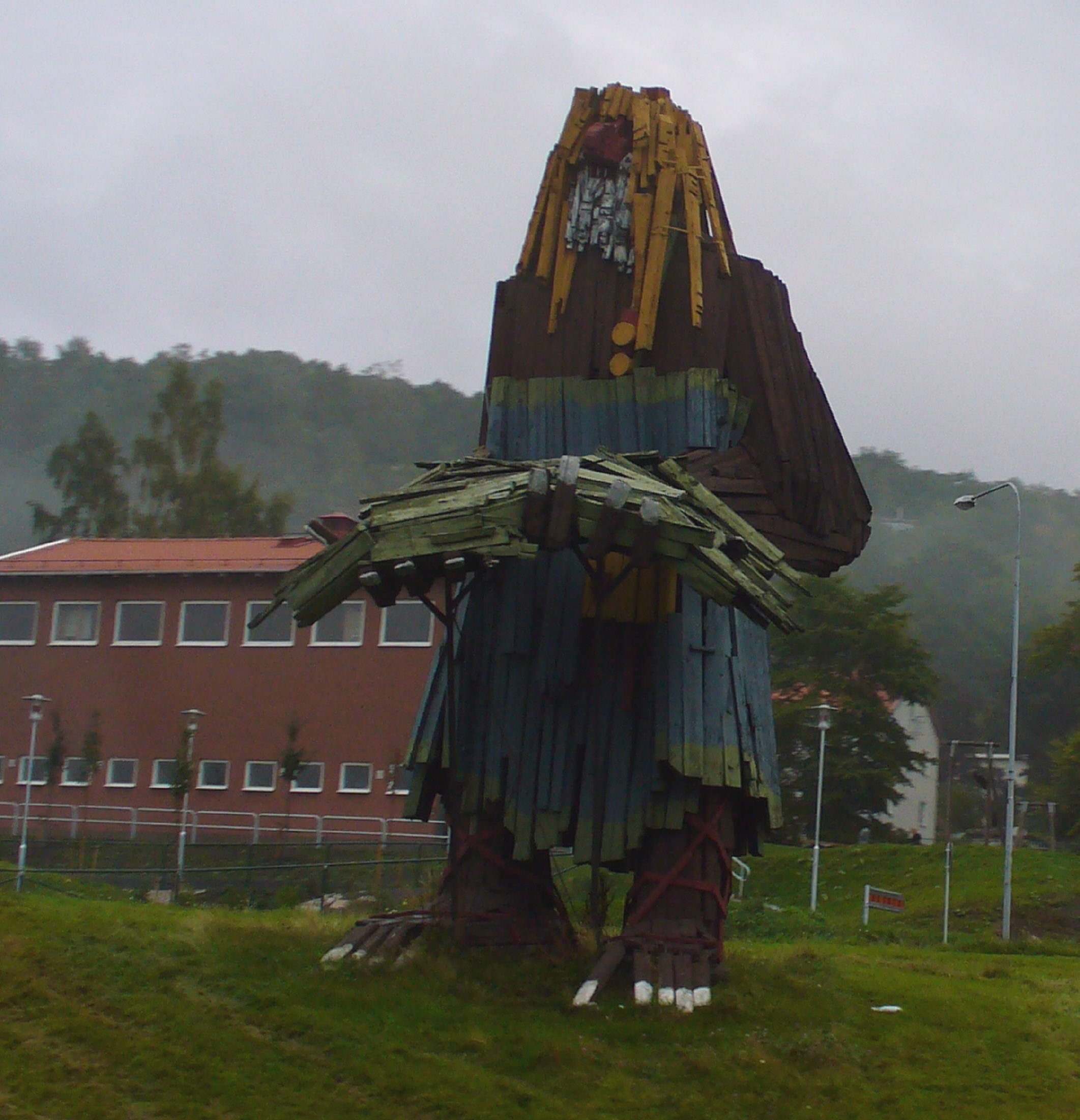
- The Giant Vist wooden sculpture in October 2008
- Died: 4 August 2015

Calle Olof Sigvard Örnemark (19 December 1933 – 4 August 2015) was a Swedish artist and sculptor from Jönköping Municipality, Sweden. He is particularly known for his large wooden sculptures, but he also made paintings and metal sculptures.

His first large sculpture was Jätten Vist (the Vist the Giant), completed in 1969 and standing over 11 metres (36 ft) high next to the European route E4, at Huskvarna. According to the legend, the giant was on his way home from a party in Västergötland. He threw some grass and soil into Lake Vättern for his wife to step on, thus creating the island Visingsö.

In the 1980s, his very large outdoor wooden sculptures Bounty and Indiska reptricket (the Indian rope trick) at Riddersberg manor, south of Jönköping, drew many visitors. The mobile Bounty resembled a ship, and the 103-meter-high Indiska reptricket was the world's tallest sculpture. Both were removed from the exhibition in 2007 after their condition had deteriorated.

His later work includes a wooden balloon in Gränna, Sweden and Morgans skip in Gratangen, Norway, showing the wrecking of Henry Morgan's ship Oxford in the Caribbean.

Örnemark lived and worked in Gränna but also maintained a studio on Visingsö.

Örnemark died on 4 August 2015 at the age of 81.
