= Beatrice Lesslie =

Swedish businesswoman

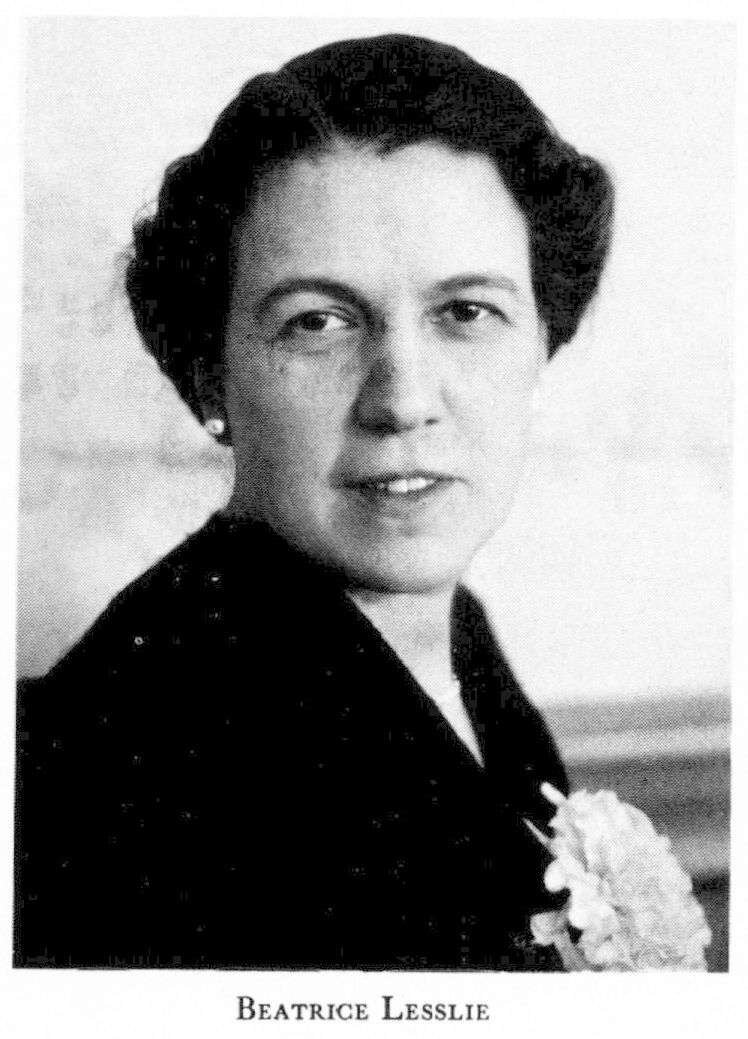
- Born: 10 August 1890; Örgryte församling
- Died: 25 February 1967 (aged 76); Johannebergs församling
- Awards: Knight First Class of the Order of the White Rose of Finland; Memorial medal of the Winter War

Hildur Annie Beatrice Lesslie née Kylander (1890–1967) was a Swedish businesswoman in the clothing industry who, after her husband's death in 1936, managed the Gothenburg clothing firm Konfektions AB Lesslie until 1962 when her son took over. She successfully increased the firm's profitability, employing up to 350 workers and producing ready-to-wear women's coats, suits and furs. Beatrice Lesslie is also remembered for supporting Finnish refugees in the Second World War and for more generally helping Finland during the Finnish Winter War.

== Biography ==
Born in Gothenburg on 10 August 1890, Hildur Annie Beatrice Kylander was the daughter of the prison official Axel Kylander and his wife Hedig née Hansdotter. In 1917, she married the Finnish consul Carl Otto Vilhelm Lesslie (1879–1936). They had three children Margareta, Carl Otto and Aina.

Together with Alfred Heyman, her husband Otto established the clothing company Konfektions AB Lesslie in 1917. When Heyman died in 1918, her husband ran the company until his own death in 1936 when Beatrice took over. Under her management, with some 350 employees the firm prospered, focusing on ready-to-wear coats, suits and furs for women, producing up to 70,000 items per year by the 1950s. The business, like its counterparts, later suffered from excess capacity.

Beatrice Lesslie is also remembered for her influential role during the Second World War in Foreningen Norden, catering for Finnish refugess in Stockholm and giving general assistance to Finland. In particular, she provided for war-afflicted Finnish children and cared for wounded soldiers in Gothenborg. As a result, she was honoured with the Order of the White Rose of Finland. She also helped those in need in Norway during the German occupation.

Beatrice Lesslie died in Gothenbung on 25 February 1967. She was buried in the city's Eastern Cemetery.
