= Jonas af Jochnick =

Swedish businessman (1937–2019)

- Born: 14 August 1937; Sweden
- Died: 16 May 2019 (aged 81)
- Occupation: Businessman

Jonas af Jochnick (21 May 1937 – 16 May 2019) was a Swedish businessman, most notable for co-founding Oriflame Cosmetics with his brother Robert af Jochnick in 1967 in Sweden. In 2003 the brothers shared the International Swede of the Year award. As of 2006, Jonas af Jochnick was Sweden's 19th wealthiest person as estimated by business magazine Veckans Affärer.

== See also ==
- List of multi-level marketing companies
