= Ellen Hodakova Larsson =

Swedish fashion designer

- Education: Swedish School of Textiles
- Occupation: Fashion designer
- Years active: 2021–present
- Awards: LVMH Prize for Young Fashion Designers (2024)

Ellen Hodakova Larsson is a Swedish fashion designer and creator of the clothing label Hodakova. She founded the label in Stockholm in 2021 and works only with existing garments, surplus stock and discarded everyday objects, which she takes apart and reassembles into ready-to-wear clothing and accessories.

In 2024 Hodakova was the winner of the LVMH Prize for Young Designers. Larsson was the first Swedish designer to win the award, which carried a grant of €400,000 and a year of mentoring by executives of the luxury group. Her clothes have been worn on the red carpet by Cate Blanchett, Lady Gaga, Rihanna, Dua Lipa and Billie Eilish.

== Early life and education ==
Hodakova grew up on a horse farm near Strängnäs. Her mother was a seamstress, and her father in the military. The family moved to her grandparents' farm when Larsson was a small girl, after her grandmother was widowed; her mother specialized in fur work and taught her to repair and remake clothes and household objects. Larsson rode from an early age and competed as an equestrian as a teenager.

After leaving school she studied sculpture and painting before turning to fashion design.

Hodakova was a 2019 graduate of the Swedish School of Textiles. There she studied fine art and sculpture alongside tailoring.

== Career ==
Larsson founded Hodakova in Stockholm in 2021 and named it after her grandmother's maiden name. The label's garments and accessories are made entirely from second-hand clothing, surplus stock and discarded objects; recurring materials include leather belts, trousers, starched shirt collars, zippers and riding boots. Larsson has described her method as taking garments apart and putting the pieces together like a puzzle to form new luxury clothing. She has cited Martin Margiela and Elsa Schiaparelli as influences.

In 2023, Hodakova collaborated with Gucci as part of its Gucci Continuum project, creating bags, skirts and bandeau tops from the fashion house's GG-logo belts.

In 2025 she designed shoes in collaboration with Sergio Rossi for her runway show.

Larsson has said that her aim is to build a fully sustainable fashion house. Because working with used material at scale is slow, she and her team have developed artificial intelligence tools to help sort and grade discarded garments and assess how they can be reused; she said she would direct part of the LVMH prize money and mentoring toward that project. The company remains based in Stockholm, and by late 2024 the label was sold in 18 countries, including at Dover Street Market.

=== LVMH Prize ===
In 2024 Larsson was a finalist for the LVMH Prize for Young Fashion Designers, an award open to designers aged 18 to 40 who have produced at least two collections. About 2,500 designers applied that year and 20 were named semi-finalists; Larsson was the first Scandinavian finalist since the Danish designer Cecilie Bahnsen in 2017. Natalie Portman presented her with the prize on September 10, 2024, making her the first Swedish winner. The award carried €400,000 and a year of mentoring by LVMH executives; the Karl Lagerfeld Prize and the newly created Savoir-Faire Prize, each worth €200,000, went to Duran Lantink and to Michael Stewart of Standing Ground.

=== Collections and runway shows ===
Hodakova's spring/summer 2025 collection was presented on the official Paris Fashion Week calendar and styled by Lotta Volkova; second-hand fur berets were massed into cocktail dresses, riding boots were rebuilt as miniskirts and vintage tea towels were remade as A-line separates. Her first major show after the LVMH Prize, for autumn/winter 2025, included a coat made from fur hats, a jacket assembled from men's tailored trousers and an evening dress made from a cello.

For spring/summer 2026, shown in the Portzamparc wing of the Musée Bourdelle in Paris in September 2025, Larsson added umbrella ribs and old books to her materials and introduced footwear made from surplus leather. The autumn/winter 2026 collection, shown in Paris in March 2026, took the idea of the home as its subject: a rug was reworked into a capelet, chair parts and bed linen were built into garments, and horsehair violin strings were used in place of the zippers of earlier seasons. The first half of the collection was made in collaboration with Harris Tweed.

=== Red carpet ===
Lady Gaga and Cate Blanchett have worn Hodakova's 'trash to treasure' designs.

== Awards ==
Larsson was named designer of the year at the Swedish Elle gala in 2023 and again in 2026. She won the LVMH Prize for Young Fashion Designers in 2024.
