= Carl Fredrik Sammeli =

Swedish businessman

Carl Fredrik Sammeli (born 1971, Nederluleå, Sweden) is the founder of Prime Weber Shandwick, Sweden's largest PR agency and the world's most awarded agency by Cannes Lions between 2010 and 2021. Since 2014, Prime has been a part of the PR network Weber Shandwick, covering 81 countries. Sammeli has over 20 years of experience within entrepreneurship, business development, sales strategy, tactics and communication. He works with all industries and specializes within B2B industries, in particular professional services. Since 2012, Sammeli has worked internationally and is based in Cape Town, South Africa where he lives with his family. Since 2014, he has been a part of the Weber Shandwick Leadership Team. Today, he works as an investor and advisor with early-stage entrepreneurs, family offices, family-owned businesses and investment companies. He is also co-founder of prop-tech company, Bitprop, that helps provide property income and ownership to those without it. Bitprop partners with property owners to help them build rental flats on their property, engaging in rental management training and assistance to help them earn rental income from their property.

Prior to founding Prime and joining Weber Shandwick, Sammeli's career in PR includes being responsible for media and crisis management in the national Swedish referendum campaign “Yes to Europe” (1993–1994). Yes to EU won the referendum with 52.3% of the votes, and Sweden entered the European Union on January 1, 1995. In 1998, he was appointed Head of Corporate Communication of the Modern Times Group. Sammeli was part of the industry committee that laid out the Stockholm Charter, hence adopted by the International Communications Consultancy Organization (ICCO), which now serves as a global code of conduct for the PR industry.

Carl Fredrik's entrepreneurial track record includes 2 failures and 7 successes, with the most successful earning a 1200+ times return on capital. A couple of his endeavours, such as Bitprop and APAC (the second SPAC in Sweden), are still in growth mode. Carl Fredrik has been ranked as the 85th most influential person in Sweden, where he is still very involved, despite living in South Africa. Carl Fredrik is a member of the Ratio Academy (an independent research in Stockholm, Sweden) with other senior business leaders such as Rune Andersson, Björn Wahlroos and Dan Olofsson. He is also a member of the United Nations Children's Fund (UNICEF) Global Advisory group.
