= Ödeshög =

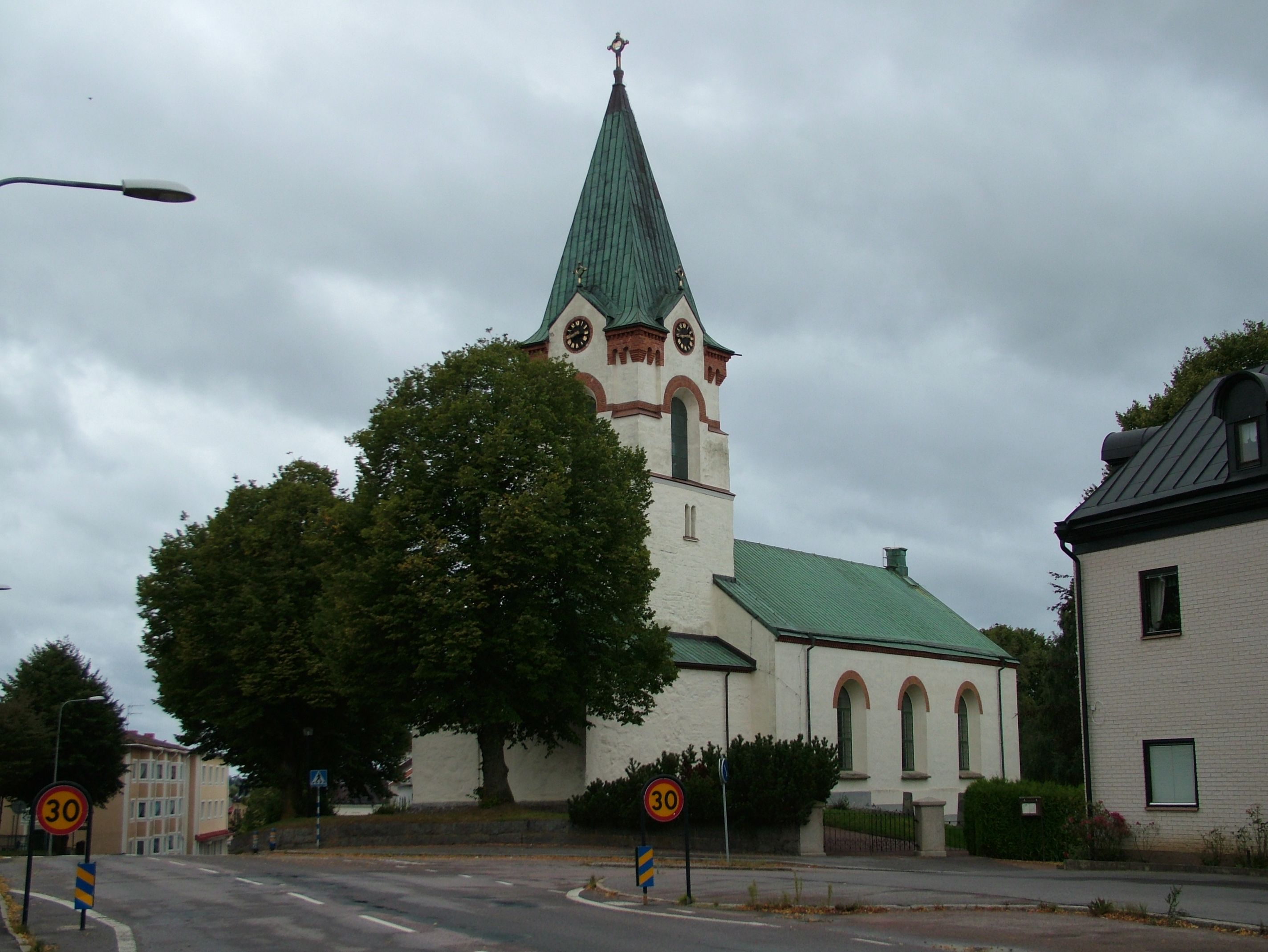
- Ödeshög Church in September 2007

- Location within Östergötland Location within Sweden
- Coordinates: 58°13′N 14°39′E
- Country: Sweden
- Province: Östergötland
- County: Östergötland County
- Municipality: Ödeshög Municipality

Area
  - Total: 2.41 km^{2} (0.93 sq mi)

Population (31 December 2020)
  - Total: 2,711
  - Density: 1,120/km^{2} (2,910/sq mi)
- Time zone: UTC+1 (CET)
  - Summer (DST): UTC+2 (CEST)

Ödeshög (Swedish pronunciation: [ˈø̂ːdɛsˌhøːɡ]) is a locality and the seat of Ödeshög Municipality, Östergötland County, Sweden with 2,572 inhabitants in 2010.

== Personalities ==
Ödeshög is the birthplace of former Swedish professional football player Klas Ingesson.

== Twin towns ==
- Obal, Belarus
