= Hästholmen, Östergötland =

Hästholmen
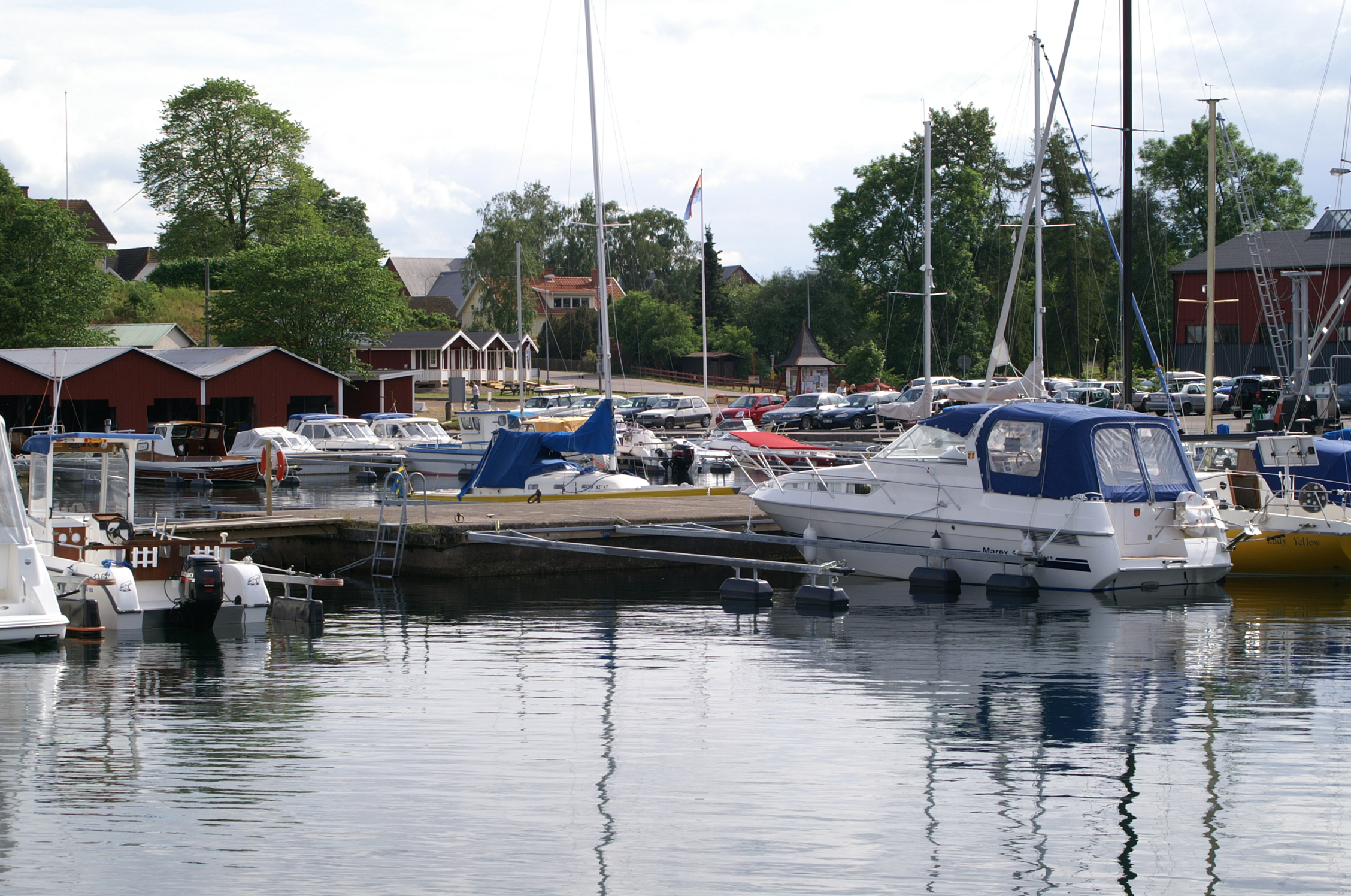
- Hästholmen horbour

- Location within Östergötland Location within Sweden
- Coordinates: 58°16′43″N 14°38′26″E
- Country: Sweden
- Province: Östergötland
- County: Östergötland County
- Municipality: Ödeshög Municipality

Area
  - Total: 0.37 km^{2} (0.14 sq mi)

Population (31 December 2020)
  - Total: 320
  - Density: 860/km^{2} (2,200/sq mi)
- Time zone: UTC+1 (CET)
  - Summer (DST): UTC+2 (CEST)

Hästholmen is a locality situated in Ödeshög Municipality, Östergötland County, Sweden with 342 inhabitants in 2010.
