= Oriflame =

Swedish-Swiss multinational beauty and personal care company

Oriflame Holding AG

- Type: Private
- Industry: Direct selling
- Founded: 1 January 1967
- Founders: Jonas af Jochnick; Robert af Jochnick; Bengt Hellsten
- Headquarters: Stockholm, Sweden; Schaffhausen, Switzerland
- Key people: Kenneth Campbell (CEO); Alexander af Jochnick
- Products: Skincare; Cosmetics; Fragrances
- Revenue: 561M
- Number of employees: 3000
- Website: oriflame.com

Oriflame Holding AG is a Swedish-founded multinational multi-level marketing company with its corporate head office in Switzerland, that sells beauty and personal care products directly to consumers online through a network of independent Beauty Entrepreneurs and members.

== History ==
Oriflame was founded on 1 January 1967, in Sweden by brothers Jonas af Jochnick and Robert af Jochnick, and their friend Bengt Hellsten. The head office of Oriflame is located in Schaffhausen, Switzerland, with registered offices in Stockholm, Sweden and London, United Kingdom.

IK Partners (Formerly Industri Kapital) acquired Oriflame through a public offering on the London Stock Exchange in October 1999. IK gradually reduced its stake, before final exit in March 2006. Oriflame was traded on the Nasdaq Stockholm until being delisted on 17 July 2019.

In 2023, Anna Malmhake succeeded Magnus Brännström as CEO & President after Brännström's 18-year tenure.

At the end of 2024, the company announced that it had successfully completed its comprehensive recapitalisation, with the overwhelming support of the af Jochnick family and investors representing more than 90% of the Company’s bondholders. The recapitalisation included €71.5m in new capital, comprising €50m of committed financing and an additional facility of €21.5m, from the af Jochnick family and a consortium of long-term investors.

In 2025, Oriflame announced that Anna Malmhake had decided to step down as CEO, succeeded by Kenneth Campbell, a former senior executive from L'Oreal

== Operations ==
The company hasapproximately 3,000 employees, 1,000 products, and a turnover of over 561 Million Euro. As of August 2026, Oriflame operated in more than 60 countries, with a community of more than 3 million Oriflame Beauty Entreprenuers and members.

In 2023, Oriflame signed a collaboration contract with Arnest Management LLC (Arnest) a perfume, cosmetic, and household products manufacturer from Russia to acquire Cetes Cosmetics Russia.

In 2025, Oriflame announced a new sourcing strategy to move production to a number of high-end partners both in Europe and in India The company retains manufacturing operations in China.
