= Treaty of Lödöse =

1249 treaty between Norway and Sweden

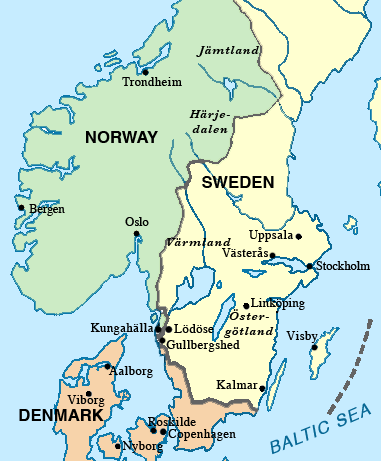
Southern Scandinavia in 1250

The Treaty of Lödöse (Norwegian: Freden i Lödöse, Swedish: Freden i Lödöse) was a peace treaty between the Swedish king Eric XI and the Norwegian king Haakon IV. The treaty was negotiated between King Haakon and the Jarl of Sweden, Birger Magnusson, in the town of Lödöse, during the summer of 1249. The main purpose of the treaty was to prevent mutual hostility from escalating into war. Some factions of the Swedish nobility wanted to attack Norway in retribution for a raid by King Haakon, which had targeted Norwegian rebels in the Swedish province of Värmland 24 years earlier.

In Lödöse, the two parties sworn that from then on fraternity and peace should prevail between the two kingdoms and that neither of the two would support or provide a haven for enemies of the other. It was also decided that Birger's daughter Rikissa, would marry the son of Haakon, Haakon the Young.

== Background ==
The Nordic royal families were closely related during the Middle Ages, and the formation of different alliances constantly threatened stability in Scandinavia. All three kingdoms sought to prevent the other two from dominating the region. Domestic politics in Norway, Denmark, and Sweden was above all shaped by the struggle between different clans for possession of the throne. In Sweden, the House of Eric (supported by Denmark) and the House of Sverker (supported by Norway) had been contesting for power since the murder of King Sverker the Elder in 1156.

Norway was at the time plagued by a prolonged civil war. Several pretenders to the throne were challenging King Haakon IV. Forces supporting the pretender Sigurd Ribbung used the Swedish province of Värmland as a safe haven for operations into Norway. Emissaries of the Norwegian king complained to the lawspeaker of Värmland and the Swedish king several times, but to no avail. Since the Swedes took no action against Ribbung, King Haakon led his army into Värmland during the winter of 1225. There he plundered the region in an attempt to quell Ribbung's rebellion. Haakon's incursion angered the Swedes, but because of their internal conflicts they were unable to retaliate.

In 1229, the thirteen-year-old King Eric XI of Sweden was ousted from the throne by one of the members of his privy council, Canute II. After his supporters were overpowered at the Battle of Olustra in Södermanland, Eric was forced to flee to Denmark. Following the battle, Canute declared himself King of Sweden. His reign was marked by unrest and violence. In the year 1234, Eric returned to Sweden and re-conquered the throne. (Note: The exact circumstances and events surrounding Eric's restoration to the throne is debated. It is known that Eric returned to Sweden in 1234, probably with an army. According to one school, King Canute II was then killed in a battle against Eric and his allies, after which Eric regained the throne. Other historians agree that Canute died around this time, but whether he died in a battle with Eric or from other causes is undetermined. He might have died from natural causes before Eric's return to Sweden. It is, however, certain that Canute's son, Holmger Knutsson, fought Eric until he was defeated at the Battle of Sparrsätra in 1247 and later decapitated the following year.)

== The treaty ==
After Eric was reinstated as king, some factions of the Swedish nobility advocated war with Norway. They wanted retribution for the Norwegian plundering of Värmland. According to the Norwegian saga Sverris saga, the future jarl Birger Magnusson were among those in favour of war; however, at the time, the de facto ruler of Sweden Jarl Ulf Fase and his supporters were against attacking Norway. To prevent mutual hostility from escalating into war, Haakon IV of Norway sent an envoy to Sweden to conciliate. The Swedes agreed to talk, and a delegation led by Birger was sent to Kungahälla in Norway. Negotiations were held in the spring of 1241, however, no agreement was reached.

In 1247, Sweden re-approached Norway, and a meeting between the two Kings was scheduled in the town of Lödöse in the province Västergötland for the summer of 1248. Lödöse was chosen as the meeting place because it was situated in the nearest Swedish province that could be reached by sea from Norway. The following year, Eric traveled to Lödöse at the scheduled time, but Haakon was delayed. Eric waited for Haakon, but was forced to leave when his supplies started running low. A new meeting, at the same place, was scheduled for the next year. In the summer of 1249, Eric returned to Lödöse, together with his brother-in-law Birger, who had by then become Jarl of Sweden. When the Swedes saw Haakon approaching Lödöse from the sea with a large fleet, they became scared and fled. Haakon sent a messenger bidding the Swedish king to come back and negotiate; however, the king was already in Östergötland and did not want to return. Instead, Birger Jarl, the de facto ruler, traveled back to Lödöse to negotiate with the Norwegian king.

After negotiations, Birger Jarl and King Haakon came to an agreement and swore that from then onward, fraternity and peace would prevail between the two kingdoms and that neither of the two would support or provide safe haven for enemies of the other. It was also decided that Birger's daughter, Rikissa Birgersdotter, would marry the son of Haakon, Haakon the Young.

== Notes and references ==
Notes

Bibliography

- Gahrn, Lars (1988). Sveariket i källor och historieskrivning [Svea Rike in Sources and Historiography] (in Swedish). Institute of History, University of Gothenburg. ISBN 91-7900-550-0.
- Harrison, Dick (2002). Jarlens sekel: en berättelse om 1200-talets Sverige [The Century of the Jarl: A History of 13th-century Sweden] (in Swedish). Ordfront. ISBN 978-91-7441-359-5.
- Harrison, Dick (2009). Sveriges historia 600-1350 [The History of Sweden 600-1350] (in Swedish). Norstedts. ISBN 978-91-1-302377-9.
- Sundberg, Ulf (1997). Svenska freder och stillestånd 1249-1814 [Swedish Peace Treaties and Armistices 1249-1814] (in Swedish). Arete. ISBN 91-89080-01-7.
- Sundberg, Ulf (1999). Medeltidens svenska krig [Medieval Swedish Wars] (in Swedish). Hjalmarson & Högberg. ISBN 978-91-89660-11-3.
