= Battle of Olustra =

Revolt in Sweden in 1229

The Battle of Olustra
Date	1229
Location	Södermanland or Östergötland
Result	Folkung victory

Belligerents
Eric XI	Folkung; Knut Holmgersson

Strength
Unknown	Unknown

The Battle of Olustra (Swedish: Slaget vid Olustra; 1229) was a battle between Erik Eriksson, and the Folkungs, led by Knut Holmgersson. The battle did most likely take place in Olustra in Södermanland (Sweden), but other mentions say that it took place in Alvastra, Östergötland. The battle ended in a victory for the Folkungs, Erik Eriksson fled to Denmark in 1230.

== Aftermath ==
The Folkungs was known for constant revolts and dissatisfaction about the throne of Sweden. With other words, they wanted more power. The Folkungs made many revolts afterwards, some of them being the First Folkung Uprising (1247), the Second Folkung Uprising (1251) and the Third Folkung Uprising (1278-1280). Even though the Folkungs were not often successful in these uprisings, they were still a big threat to the Swedish kings.

Erik Eriksson fled to Denmark in 1230 after he was defeated by Knut Holmgersson, and Erik only returned to Sweden when Knut had been confirmed dead some years later.

== The Eric dynasty ==
The Eric dynasty is a name for the royal family that descended from Eric the Holy. The dynasty had a rivalry with the Sverker dynasty during the 12th and 13th century, mainly fighting for the throne of Sweden. Erik Eriksson was a part of the Eric Dynasty, he was also the last king of the dynasty. Erik Eriksson ascended to the throne in 1222, and later died in 1250, marking the end of the Eric dynasty.

== See also ==
- Folkung
- House of Eric
- House of Sverker
