= Knut Magnusson =

Knut Magnusson, a member of the Folkunge party and a magnate in Västergötland, died (executed) in 1251. He was the son of Magnus Broka (House of Bjelbo) and Katarina, daughter of king Erik Knutsson of Sweden.

Upon the death of Erik the Lisp and Lame, Knut Magnusson had double claims to the throne (through both his father and mother). After Valdemar Birgersson's election as king in 1250, Knut, along with Filip Knutsson and other Folkunge members, started a rebellion.

They enlisted soldiers in Germany and rode north through Sweden, but were defeated in the Battle of Herrevadsbro in 1251. Knut was executed after the battle.

== Children ==
- Birgitta Knutsdotter (House of Bjelbo), married to Ulf Jonsson Roos from Ervalla.
