= Canute of Sweden =

Canute, Cnut or Knut of Sweden may refer to:

- Knut Eriksson, King of Sweden from 1173 to 1195
- Knut Långe, King of Sweden from 1229 until his death in 1234
- Cnut, King of England from 1016, King of Denmark from 1018, and King of Norway from 1028
- Canute V of Denmark, King of Denmark from 1146 to 1157
