= Helena Pedersdatter Strange =

Queen of Sweden from 1229 to 1234

Helena Pedersdatter

Queen consort of Sweden
- Tenure: 1229–1234
- Born: 1200
- Died: 1255 (aged 54–55)
- Spouse: Canute II of Sweden
- Father: Peder Strangesson
- Mother: Ingeborg Esbernsdatter

Helena Pedersdotter Strange (Danish: Helene; in Sweden also called Queen Elin; c. 1200–1255) of a Danish noble family later called Ulfeldt was a Queen of Sweden as the wife of King Canute II.

Her father was the Danish knight Peder Strangesson and her mother was Ingeborg Esbernsdatter, of the noble Hvide clan, a niece of Danish Archbishop Absalon. She is believed to have married the Swedish regent Canute in about 1225, though the exact year is not known. From 1222 he was the regent for the child monarch, King Eric XI of Sweden, and took the throne himself in 1229, thereby making Helena, or Elin as she was often called in Sweden, Queen. She used the same seal as her husband on official documents, a curious fact which indicates that she may have exerted some political influence.

In 1234, her husband died, and the deposed King Eric returned. Queen Dowager Elin remarried the nobleman Filip Lauresson. In 1247, she witnessed her son from her first marriage rebel against the new monarch; he failed, and was executed in 1248. Her second son was executed in 1251, and the same year, she became a widow. She died about 1255.

== Children ==
1. Holmger Knutsson, d. 1248, executed in a rebellion after the Battle of Sparrsätra of 1247.
2. Filip Knutsson, executed in 1251.

== Sources ==
Helena Pedersdotter Born: 1200 Died: 1255
Swedish royalty
Preceded by Rikissa of Denmark	Queen consort of Sweden; 1229–1234	Succeeded by Catherine of Ymseborg
