= Canute II =

Canute II may refer to:

- Canute II of Sweden, king of Sweden from 1229 to 1234
- Canute the Great, king of Denmark and of England as Canute I (died in 1035)
