= Marianne of Sweden =

Marianne of Sweden - also Mariana or Marina - may refer to:

- Marianne, Princess of Sweden, died 1252, daughter of King Eric "X", married Prince of Pomerania
- Marianne. Princess of Sweden around 1269, daughter of King Waldemar, married Prince of Diepholz
