= Märta Eriksdotter =

Märta Eriksdotter may refer to:

- Märta Eriksdotter (Bonde) (fl. first half of 13th century), an alleged daughter of King Erik Knutsson of Sweden
- Martha of Denmark (after 1277 – 1341), queen of Sweden in 1298–1318
- Martha Leijonhufvud (1520–1584), a Swedish noblewoman
