= Rikissa of Denmark =

Queen of Sweden from 1210 to 1216

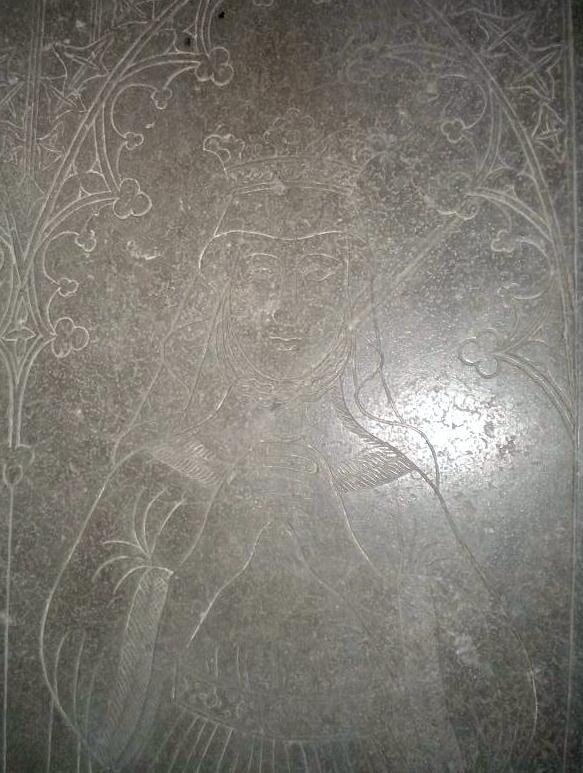
- 17th century depiction of Rikissa on Erik Knutsson's gravestone in Varnhem Abbey

Queen consort of Sweden
- Tenure: 1210–1216
- Born: c. 1178; Denmark
- Died: 8 May 1220; Denmark
- Spouse: Erik Knutsson
- Issue: Sophia Eriksdotter; Martha Eriksdotter; Ingeborg Eriksdotter; Marianna Eriksdotter; Erik Eriksson
- House: Estridsen
- Father: Valdemar I of Denmark
- Mother: Sophia of Minsk

Rikissa of Denmark (Swedish: Rikissa Valdemarsdotter; died 8 May 1220) was Queen of Sweden as the wife of King Erik Knutsson, and the mother of King Erik Eriksson.

== Early life ==
Rikissa was a daughter of Valdemar I of Denmark and Sophia of Minsk. She received her first name, originally a Lotharingian-Burgundian female name, in honor of her maternal grandmother, the late Richeza of Poland. In c. 1210 the new king Erik Knutsson, who had deposed his predecessor Sverker II, desired to build cordial and peaceful relations with Denmark, which had traditionally supported the House of Sverker, against the Norwegian-supported dynasty of Erik. That was why Rikissa, sister of the reigning king Valdemar II of Denmark, was married to Erik.

== Queenship ==
When she arrived at the Swedish coast, according to a later folk song, she expressed her surprise that she was expected to ride and not travel by carriage, as she had been used to in her birth country, and the Swedish noblewomen and ladies-in-waiting had encouraged her to adapt the customs of her new home country instead of trying to establish her own Danish customs.

Queen Rikissa bore exclusively daughters as long as her spouse was alive. King Erik died in 1216. Dowager Queen Rikissa was pregnant at the time and then gave birth to their only surviving son, Erik Eriksson, after the death of her spouse. The family was driven to exile from Sweden as the House of Sverker heir, Johan Sverkersson, was elected to succeed Rikissa's husband as the king. It was in Denmark that Rikissa herself died, without seeing her son's accession to the throne (in 1222), nor her daughters' marriages. She was buried in Ringsted. While nothing is concretely known about her person, the occurrence of the name Rikissa among her descendants may indicate that she was well-liked.

== Children ==
- Sophia Eriksdotter (died 1241), married Henry III of Rostock
- (allegedly) Martha Eriksdotter married Marshal Nils Sixtensson (Sparre)
- Ingeborg Eriksdotter (died 1254), married to Birger Jarl, regent of Sweden
- (possibly) Marianna Eriksdotter, who married a duke Barnim I of Pomerania
- Erik Eriksson (1216–1250)

Rikissa Valdemarsdotter Born: 1190/1191 Died: 8 May 1220
Swedish royalty
Vacant Title last held by Ingegerd Birgersdotter	Queen consort of Sweden; 1210–1216	Vacant Title next held by Helena Pedersdotter
