= Visingsö =

Island in southern Sweden

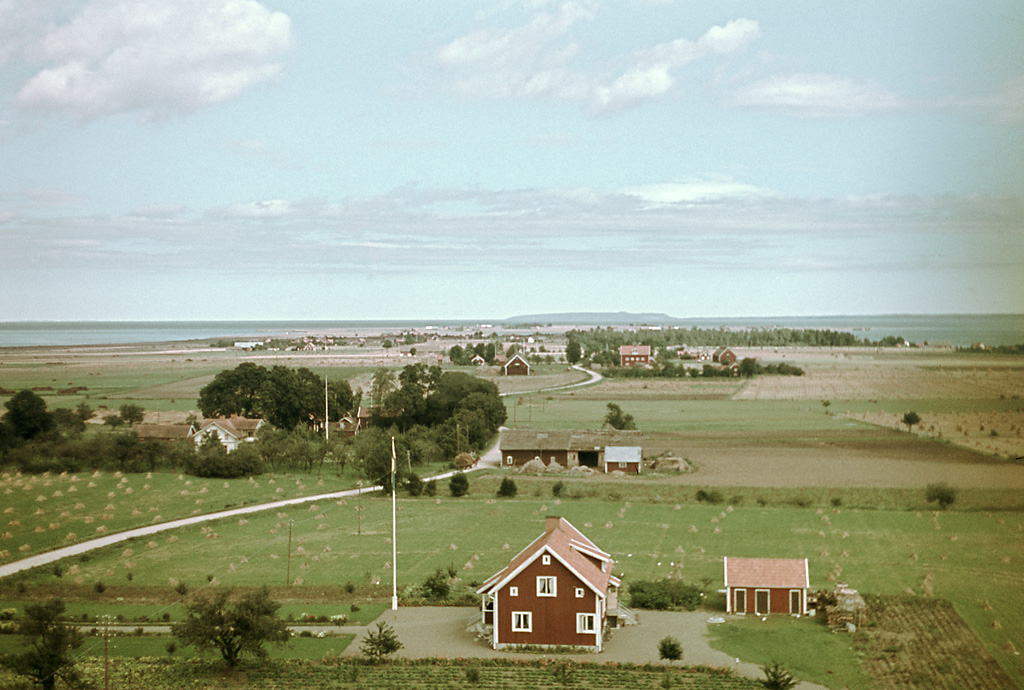
- Visingsö in 1945 from the tower of Kumlaby church

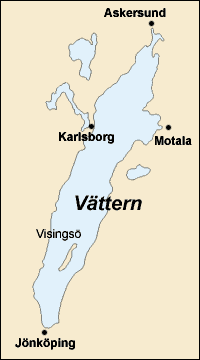
- Visingsö in lake Vättern

- Location within Sweden

Geography
- Location: Vättern
- Coordinates: 58°03′N 14°20′E
- Area: 24.97 km^{2} (9.64 sq mi)

Administration
- Sweden
- County: Jönköping

Demographics
- Population: 750 (2013)

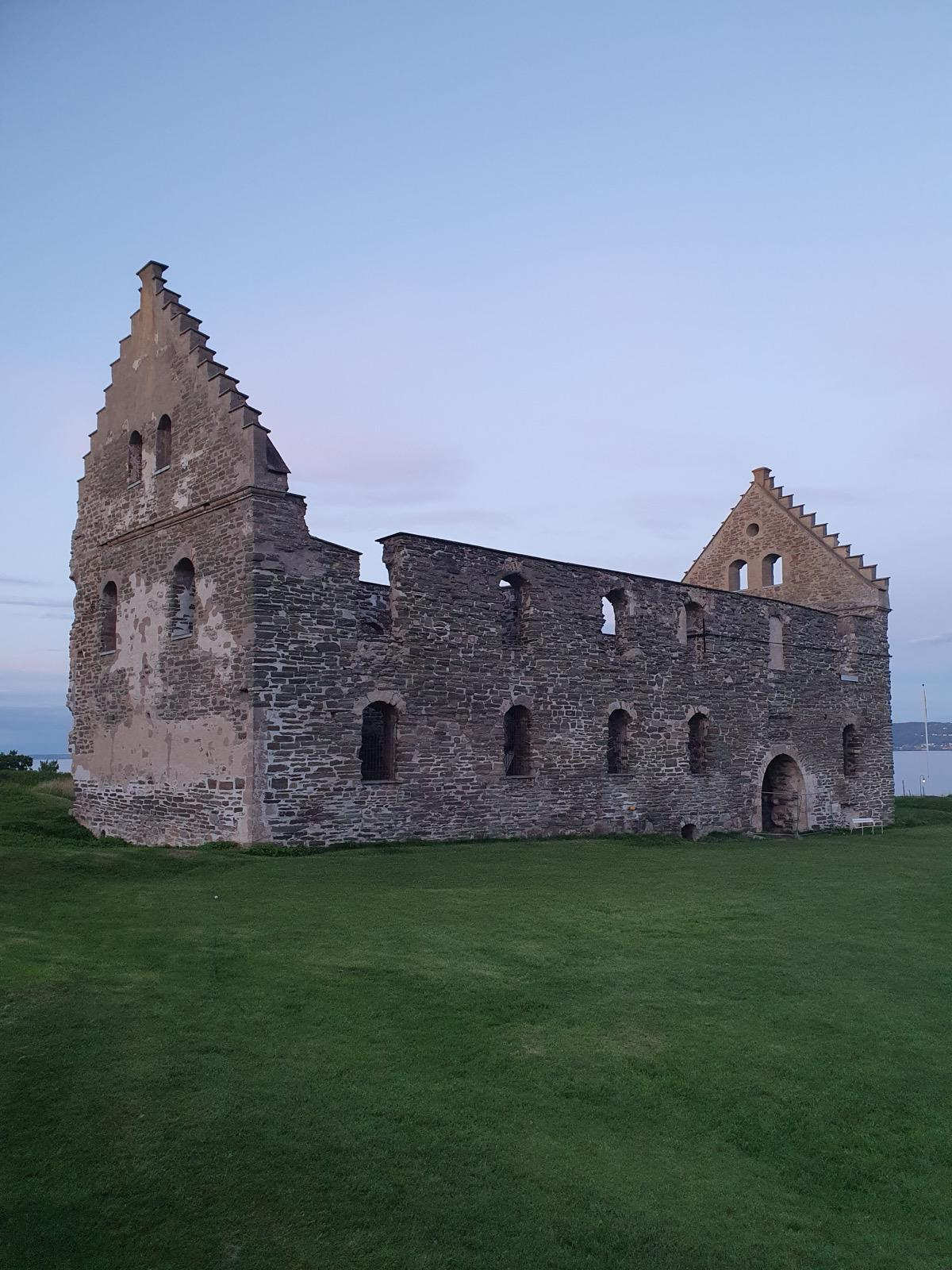
Visingsö slottsruin

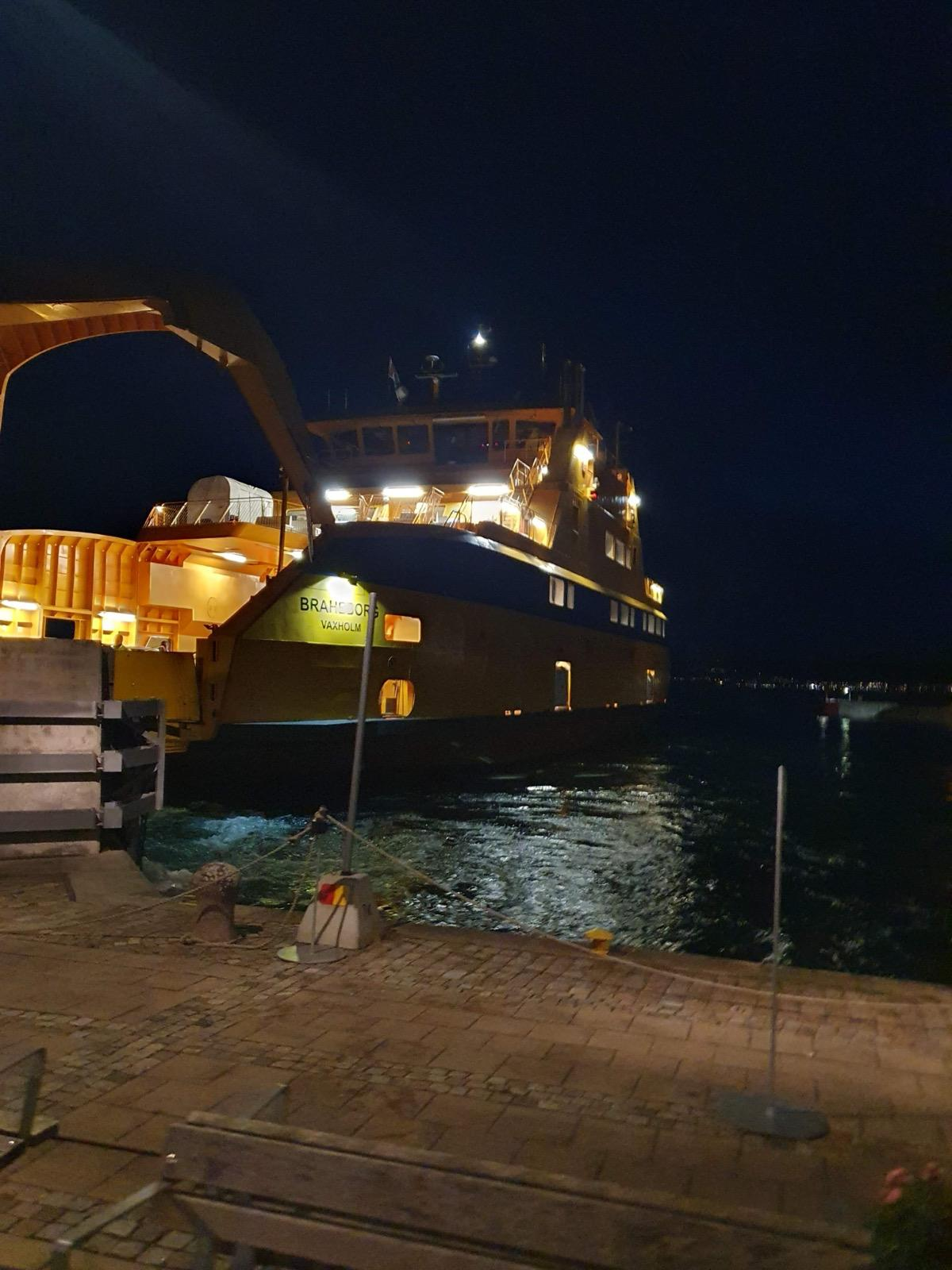
Ferry leaving the port of Visingsö towards Gränna

Visingsö is an island in the southern half of Lake Vättern in Sweden.

Visingsö lies 30 kilometres (19 miles) north of the city Jönköping and 6 kilometres (3.7 miles) west of Gränna from which two car ferries connect the island. The island is 14 kilometres (8.7 miles) long and 3 kilometres (1.9 miles) at its widest, with a total area of 24 square kilometres (9.3 square miles).

According to the statistics from Jönköping Kommun, in 2023 there was a total population of 684 people living in Vinsingsö, which was a slight decrease in population from 2019 statistics.

According to legend, a giant named Vist created Visingsö by throwing a lump of soil into the lake so that his wife could use it to step over the lake.

== History ==
Archaeological findings suggest Visingsö was inhabited as early as the Stone Age.

During the Viking Age (c. 800–1050 CE), the island may have been an important stop for trade and travel across Lake Vättern. Several ancient burial mounds and runestones on the island indicate early settlements.

In the 12th century, the House of Sverker, one of the ruling dynasties of Sweden, made Näs Castle on the southern end of Visingsö their residence during a fragile period of the Swedish monarchy. King Sverker the Elder (who ruled from c. 1130–1156) lived on the island, and four Swedish kings died there: Karl Sverkersson, Erik Knutsson, Johan Sverkersson, and Magnus Ladulås. Due to their presence, Visingsö became an important royal and administrative center during medieval times.

Visingsborg Castle became one of Sweden's most prominent royal estates during the reign of king Gustav Vasa in the 16th century. It played an important role as the seat of nobility and as a strategic outpost for the crown. Many powerful Swedish families lived on the island, including the Stålhammar family, who were granted ownership of Visingsö. In the 17th century the influential Brahe family resided in Visingsborg. The castle was also a centre for trade, with a port for goods that traveled through the lake.

In 1718, during the Great Northern War, Visingsborg Castle was burned down. Both Näs Castle and Visingsborg are presently in ruins and well known landmarks of Visingsö.

The Swedish Navy planted oak trees on the island beginning in 1831 to provide strategically important timber for future ship construction. However, once the timber was ready to harvest it was no longer required for ship construction. The Swedish Navy declined to harvest the trees when offered them in 1975. Consequently, Visingsö is partially covered by oak forests, the rest being farmland.

== Climate ==
Visingsö has an oceanic climate (Köppen Cfb), influenced by its position in the middle of the deep lake. As a result of Vättern's depth, it struggles both freezing over in winter as the surrounding landmass is colder, while in summer the temperature of the lake remains fairly cool. The relative warmth of Visingsö in summer is a result of Vättern being relatively narrow, resulting in warm air from the landmass only being slightly tempered. Temperatures below −10 °C (14 °F) in winter are not very common annually due to the open water moderating the extremes. In spite of the unfavourable conditions for heat in its deep-lake position, Visingsö has warmer summers than all of the island of Ireland as well as much of Great Britain. Even so, the cold surface water enables air frosts to occur as late as May, in extreme instances. Visingsö is very dry for much of the year, although summers can be relatively wet.

== Modern history and tourism ==
Tourism plays a major role in Visingsö's economy, particularly during the warmer months when visitors come to explore its natural beauty and historical landmarks. the area includes the ruined castle of Visingsborg on the shore of Lake Vättern, Kumlaby Church, and a large network of walking and cycling trails.

== Nature and wildlife ==
The island of Visingsö offers a diverse range of terrain types, such as; agricultural areas, forests, open fields, and wetlands, particularly in the northern and eastern parts of the island. Bird and nature watching are popular activities, and species such as; herons, grebes, and waterfowl can be found in the wetlands.

In the early nineteenth century oak trees were planted by the Swedish Navy for future shipbuilding: however, the trees' long growing time and advances in steelmaking during the nineteenth and twentieth century meant that by the time they were ready for harvest in the 1970s, they were no longer required. The area is now a forest of mature trees.

== Activities ==
Visingsö offers a wide range of opportunities to get into nature and do some ecotourism, with a considerable structure of walking and cycling trails that go through farms, open fields, and wooded areas, all with views of Lake Vättern and the neighboring areas. Renting kayaks and small boats to explore the waters around the coast and nearby islands is also an availability, and to fish in both the shallow and deep areas of the lake. There are also guided nature walks and educational programs that are available.

== Culture and events ==
The traditional cuisine includes homegrown or locally produced ingredients, such as vegetables and berries. There are small folk festivals, music events and other cultural events occur on the island.

Climate data for Visingsö (2002–2018 averages, extremes since 1995)
Month	Jan	Feb	Mar	Apr	May	Jun	Jul	Aug	Sep	Oct	Nov	Dec	Year
Record high °C (°F)	10.2 (50.4)	11.4 (52.5)	17.4 (63.3)	23.3 (73.9)	26.5 (79.7)	29.7 (85.5)	31.7 (89.1)	32.4 (90.3)	24.9 (76.8)	19.9 (67.8)	13.2 (55.8)	11.5 (52.7)	32.4 (90.3)
Mean maximum °C (°F)	6.8 (44.2)	6.5 (43.7)	11.8 (53.2)	17.3 (63.1)	21.8 (71.2)	25.1 (77.2)	26.9 (80.4)	26.3 (79.3)	21.7 (71.1)	16.1 (61.0)	11.2 (52.2)	8.2 (46.8)	28.6 (83.5)
Mean daily maximum °C (°F)	1.3 (34.3)	1.4 (34.5)	4.4 (39.9)	9.8 (49.6)	14.6 (58.3)	18.4 (65.1)	21.1 (70.0)	20.2 (68.4)	16.3 (61.3)	10.4 (50.7)	6.2 (43.2)	3.4 (38.1)	10.6 (51.1)
Daily mean °C (°F)	−0.4 (31.3)	−0.5 (31.1)	1.7 (35.1)	6.0 (42.8)	10.4 (50.7)	14.3 (57.7)	17.3 (63.1)	16.8 (62.2)	13.3 (55.9)	8.2 (46.8)	4.5 (40.1)	1.7 (35.1)	7.8 (46.0)
Mean daily minimum °C (°F)	−2.1 (28.2)	−2.4 (27.7)	−1.1 (30.0)	2.1 (35.8)	6.2 (43.2)	10.1 (50.2)	13.5 (56.3)	13.4 (56.1)	10.2 (50.4)	6.0 (42.8)	2.8 (37.0)	−0.1 (31.8)	4.9 (40.8)
Mean minimum °C (°F)	−8.7 (16.3)	−8.7 (16.3)	−6.6 (20.1)	−1.9 (28.6)	1.3 (34.3)	6.2 (43.2)	9.8 (49.6)	9.2 (48.6)	5.4 (41.7)	0.6 (33.1)	−3.3 (26.1)	−6.0 (21.2)	−11.4 (11.5)
Record low °C (°F)	−14.2 (6.4)	−20.1 (−4.2)	−12.6 (9.3)	−6.2 (20.8)	−2.1 (28.2)	4.0 (39.2)	8.0 (46.4)	5.2 (41.4)	2.5 (36.5)	−3.8 (25.2)	−9.0 (15.8)	−13.5 (7.7)	−20.1 (−4.2)
Average precipitation mm (inches)	19.9 (0.78)	17.0 (0.67)	17.2 (0.68)	24.7 (0.97)	42.4 (1.67)	69.9 (2.75)	74.0 (2.91)	70.1 (2.76)	38.1 (1.50)	44.5 (1.75)	33.4 (1.31)	24.2 (0.95)	475.4 (18.7)
Source 1: SMHI Open Data for Visingsö A, precipitation
Source 2: SMHI Open Data for Visingsö A, temperature

Climate data for Visingsö (2015–2020 averages, extremes since 1995)
Month	Jan	Feb	Mar	Apr	May	Jun	Jul	Aug	Sep	Oct	Nov	Dec	Year
Record high °C (°F)	10.2 (50.4)	11.4 (52.5)	17.4 (63.3)	23.3 (73.9)	26.5 (79.7)	29.7 (85.5)	31.7 (89.1)	32.4 (90.3)	24.9 (76.8)	19.9 (67.8)	13.2 (55.8)	11.5 (52.7)	32.4 (90.3)
Mean maximum °C (°F)	6.8 (44.2)	6.5 (43.7)	11.8 (53.2)	17.3 (63.1)	21.8 (71.2)	25.1 (77.2)	26.9 (80.4)	26.3 (79.3)	21.7 (71.1)	16.1 (61.0)	11.2 (52.2)	8.2 (46.8)	28.6 (83.5)
Mean daily maximum °C (°F)	2.7 (36.9)	2.9 (37.2)	5.4 (41.7)	9.8 (49.6)	14.4 (57.9)	18.9 (66.0)	20.7 (69.3)	20.2 (68.4)	16.6 (61.9)	10.9 (51.6)	7.0 (44.6)	4.9 (40.8)	11.0 (51.8)
Daily mean °C (°F)	1.0 (33.8)	1.0 (33.8)	2.6 (36.7)	6.0 (42.8)	10.1 (50.2)	15.0 (59.0)	16.6 (61.9)	16.8 (62.2)	13.5 (56.3)	8.7 (47.7)	5.2 (41.4)	3.4 (38.1)	8.3 (46.9)
Mean daily minimum °C (°F)	−0.7 (30.7)	−0.9 (30.4)	−0.2 (31.6)	2.1 (35.8)	6.0 (42.8)	10.7 (51.3)	13.2 (55.8)	13.4 (56.1)	10.5 (50.9)	6.5 (43.7)	3.5 (38.3)	1.9 (35.4)	5.5 (41.9)
Mean minimum °C (°F)	−8.7 (16.3)	−8.7 (16.3)	−6.6 (20.1)	−1.9 (28.6)	1.3 (34.3)	6.2 (43.2)	9.8 (49.6)	9.2 (48.6)	5.4 (41.7)	0.6 (33.1)	−3.3 (26.1)	−6.0 (21.2)	−11.4 (11.5)
Record low °C (°F)	−14.2 (6.4)	−20.1 (−4.2)	−12.6 (9.3)	−6.2 (20.8)	−2.1 (28.2)	4.0 (39.2)	8.0 (46.4)	5.2 (41.4)	2.5 (36.5)	−3.8 (25.2)	−9.0 (15.8)	−13.5 (7.7)	−20.1 (−4.2)
Average precipitation mm (inches)	19.9 (0.78)	17.0 (0.67)	17.2 (0.68)	24.7 (0.97)	42.4 (1.67)	69.9 (2.75)	74.0 (2.91)	70.1 (2.76)	38.1 (1.50)	44.5 (1.75)	33.4 (1.31)	24.2 (0.95)	475.4 (18.7)
Source 1: SMHI Open Data for Visingsö A, precipitation
Source 2: SMHI Open Data for Visingsö A, temperature

== Geology ==
Visingsö has long been of interest to geologists because of the development of a sedimentary series of rocks (the Visingsö Group) there (and elsewhere around Lake Vättern, especially on the west side). The surrounding rocks are largely much older "Småland granites" of mixed granite-like compositions. The Visingsö Group is approximately 1000 m thick and is divided into three units. It is Late Riphean in date. A wide array of late Precambrian fossils have been recovered from the group, including stromatolites, vase-shaped microfossils, acritarchs and macro fossils such as Tawuia. The sediments of the Visingsö Group have been preserved within the Lake Vättern graben structure.

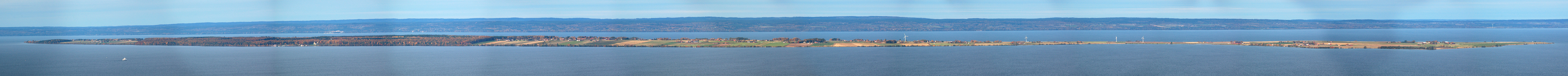
Panorama over Visingsö from Brahehus

== Transportation ==
There are two car ferries that travel between Visingsö and Gränna on a continuous basis. There are several roads connecting communities on the island, that are also served by bus. There is also a small airfield on the north end of the island, consisting of two grass runways.

== See also ==
- List of islands of Sweden
