= Second Folkung Uprising =

Revolt in the history of Sweden

The Second Folkung Uprising
Date	1251
Location	Unknown
Result	Swedish victory: Filip Knutsson executed

Belligerents
Sweden	Folkung; Danes; Germans

Commanders and leaders
Birger Jarl	Filip Knutsson (executed); Knut Magnusson (executed)

The Second Folkung Uprising (Swedish: Andra Folkungaupproret, Danish: Andet Folkungsoprør, German: Zweiter Folkung-Aufstand; 1251) was a revolt performed by the Folkungs with support from Danish and German soldiers. A dissatisfaction had built up among the insurgents, and after most likely failing the first uprising against Sweden the Folkungs, led by Filip Knutsson, made a second attempt. Unfortunately, the uprising was defeated once again.

After the attempt of recruiting soldiers from Norway which wasn’t appreciated, Filip Knutsson and Knut Magnusson requested German and Danish knights to join their revolt against Sweden and the regent, Birger Jarl. In the Battle of Herrevadsbro, the insurgents met Birger Jarl in desire of defeating him. The leaders of the uprising eventually were executed on demand by Birger.

== Prelude ==
Even though Birger Jarl was good at not bringing jealously to the Folkung league over his power and authority as a regent, it still triggered many nobles. The Folkung league did therefore unite to seize power. After big dissatisfaction due to not getting what they wished in 1247 (Battle of Sparrsätra) where the Folkungs made another uprising, thus led to an anger building up among the insurgents.

== Aftermath ==
After 27 years of peace between Sweden and the Folkung league, another revolt occurred (1278-80). This time the Folkungs were defeated once and forever; the insurgents were crushed, and they disappeared as a political power.
