= Third Folkung Uprising =

Revolt in the history of Sweden

The Third Folkung Uprising
Date	1278–1280
Location	Started in Skara, then went on to the fort in Jönköping
Result	Victory for the Swedish king

Belligerents
Sweden	Folkung

Commanders and leaders
(Sweden) Magnus Ladulås	Johan Filipsson

Casualties and losses
At least 1 knight killed	Unknown

The Third Folkung Uprising (Swedish: Tredje Folkungaupproret; 1278–1280) was the last uprising known for the political power of the Folkungs. The insurgents, who were led by the known Folkung Johan Filipsson, started the revolt in hopes to end the leadership of Sweden's current King, Magnus Ladulås.

At first the uprising was successful. Queen Helvig was forced to seek refuge in a monastery and the queen's father was taken prisoner and brought to a Folkung castle. A knight who had a good relation to the Swedish king had also been killed at the castle in Jönköping. It's also said that troops of the Folkungs attacked Norway during the period, which resulted in the Norwegians summoning their fleet.

The rebellion is said to have ended when the king managed to lure the insurgents to the castle in Jönköping, where they were captured and later also executed in 1280. According to Erik's Chronicle, the rebellion began because King Magnus had shown affection for foreign men, and especially for his appreciation of a person named Ingemar, who is said to have married his relative.
