= Märta Eriksdotter (Bonde) =

Alleged daughter of King Erik Knutsson

- Spouse: Nils Sixtensson Sparre
- Issue: Sixten Nilsson Sparre; Abjörn Nilsson Sparre
- House: House of Erik
- Father: Erik Knutsson

Märta Eriksdotter (Bonde) was the alleged daughter of Erik Knutsson, King of Sweden, flourishing in the first half of the 13th century. Knowledge about her is derived from a genealogy added to a 15th-century copy of the Erikskrönikan.

According to the genealogy she was married to Nils Sixtensson Sparre, a marshal in Sweden, and became the foremother of the noble families of Sparre and Oxenstjerna.

The genealogy may have been part of King Karl Knutsson's (d. 1470) ambition to prove his right to the throne by presenting a more impressive family background. Consequently, the existence of Märta and her marriage have been questioned by some modern Swedish historians, who believe she was fabricated by Karl or his chancellery. Nevertheless, a few historians have argued that her position cannot be entirely dismissed as a forgery.

== Children ==
Allegedly, Märta and Nils had two children:

- Sixten Nilsson Sparre
- Abjörn Nilsson Sparre

== Ancestry ==
Ancestors of Märta Eriksdotter (Bonde)

16. Jadvard Thordsson Bonde
8. Saint Erik
17. Cecilia Svensdotter
4. Knut Eriksson
18. Bjørn Haraldsen Ironside
9. Christina of Denmark
19. Katarina Ingesdotter
2. Erik Knutsson
20. Sverker the Elder
10. Johan Sverkersson
21. Ulvhild Håkansdotter
5. Cecilia Johansdotter
22.
11.
23.
1. Märta Eriksdotter
24. Erik I the Good of Denmark
12. Canute Lavard, Prince of Denmark
25. Boedil Thurgotsdatter
6. Valdemar I of Denmark
26. Mstislav I, Grand Prince of Kiev
13. Ingeborg of Kiev
27. Christina Ingesdotter of Sweden
3. Rikissa, Princess of Denmark
28.
14. Volodar of Polask
29.
7. Sophia of Minsk
30. Bolesław III Wrymouth, Duke of Poland
15. Richeza of Poland
31. Salomea of Berg
