= Battle of Sparrsätra =

1247 Swedish battle

Coordinates: 59°41′39″N 16°58′33″E

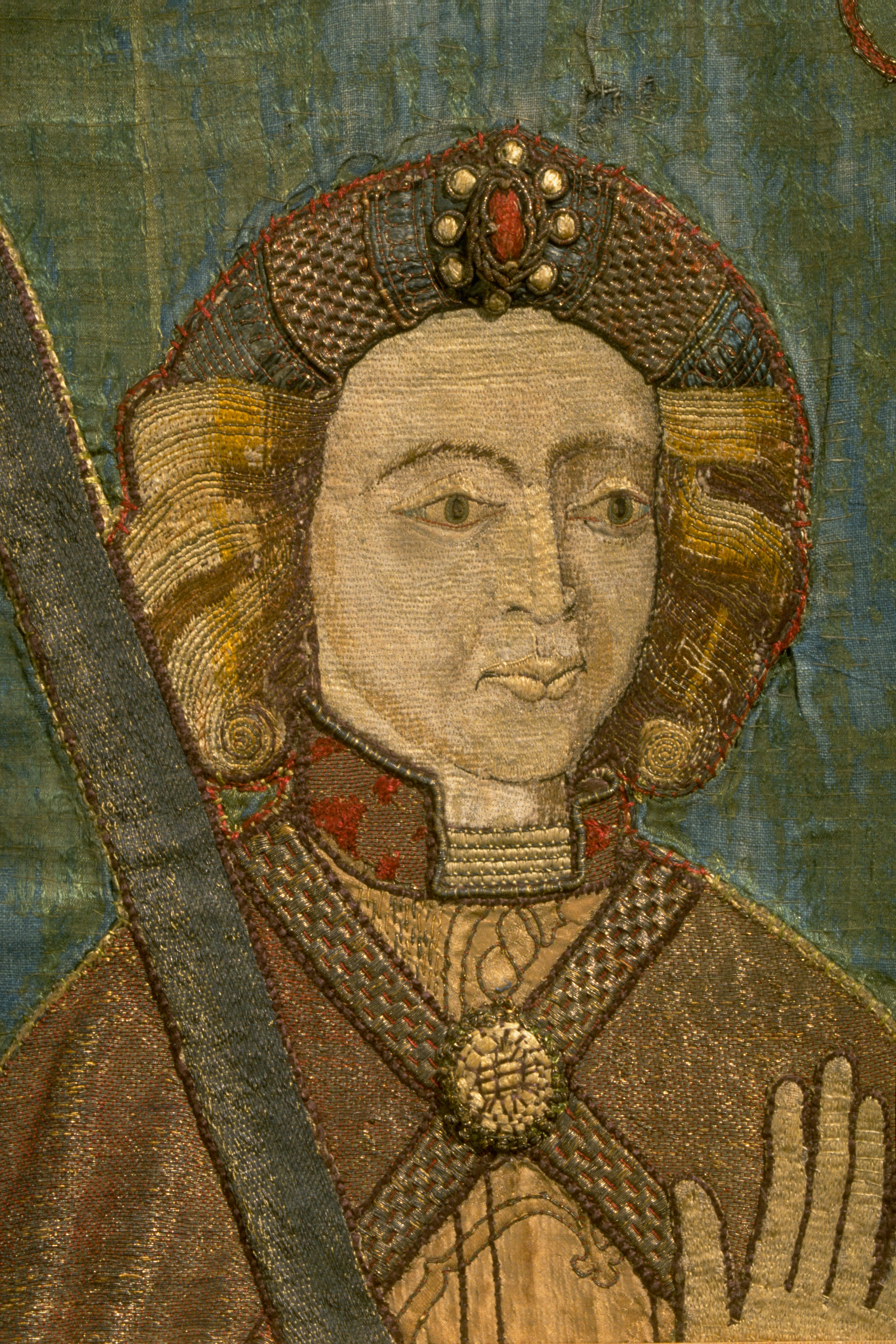
Detail of Holmger Knutson's tomb cover from Skokloster church, now in the Swedish Museum of National Antiquities

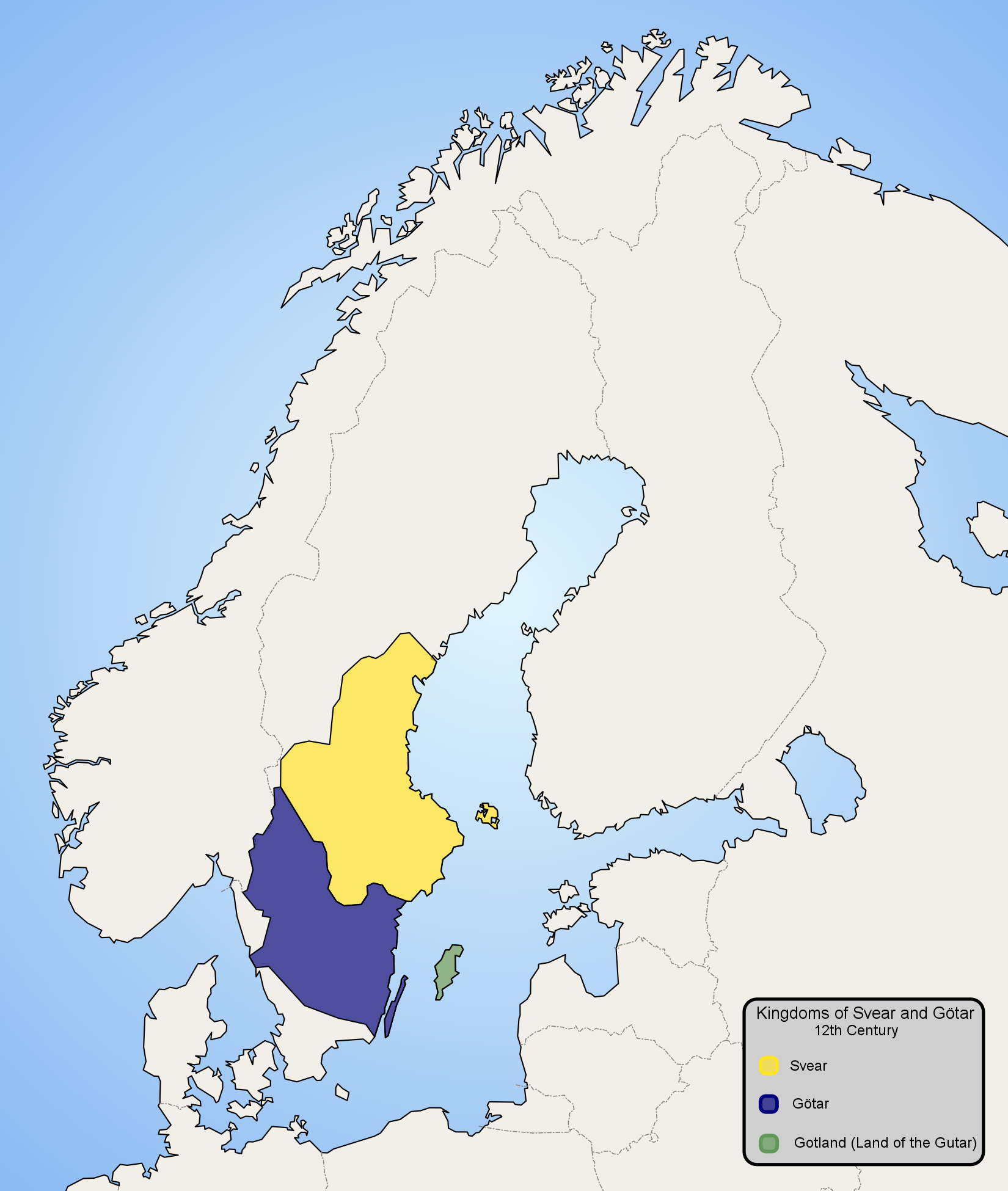
Sweden in the 12th century before the incorporation of Österland. Swedes Geats Gotlanders

The Battle of Sparrsätra was fought in 1247 between the forces of King Eric XI of Sweden and rebels led by Holmger Knutsson near Enköping in Sweden. It occurred during a poorly documented period in Swedish history; as a result, many details are uncertain and conjectural.

Although it was not the end of the Folkung rebellion, many scholars consider it to have marked the end of the old order, leading to the Uppland Swedes' loss of their semi-aristocratic status, and to the beginning of taxation by the King.

== Background ==
Since pre-historic times the Swedes of Uppland had elected the king of Sweden, and their responsibility towards him lay not in paying taxes, but in providing warriors and ships for the leidang organization. Many scholars consider the reasons for the battle to have been the abolition of the leidang organization and its replacement with monetary taxes. The people of Uppland also appear to have refused to pay tithes to the church.

The Geats of Västergötland had begun to pay tithes in the late 12th century, a decision taken independently of the Swedes. It is not known if the Geats had ever had any leidang organization, but they had accepted paying taxes, a system which provided a more stable basis of power for the King.

The main source for what was at stake during the battle is the Annals of Sigtuna, which relates that at Sparrsätra, in 1247, the rural community of Uppland lost its freedom and was charged with paying taxes, including taxes on grain production and the right of laying up a ship:

Communitas rusticorum Uplandiae Sparsaetrum amisit libertatem suam et impositae sunt eis spannmale et skipuista et konera plura.

The archaeologist Mats G. Larsson has commented that it is hardly surprising that such fundamental changes in the structure of society would meet fierce resistance. Taking part in the royal war expeditions was considered to be a natural and glorious tradition from pagan times; paying taxes to the King of Sweden, on the other hand, was likely seen as something done by defeated tributary nations - and beyond the pale for the people of Uppland.

There may have been additional reasons why the battle took place in 1247. The position of jarl in Sweden had passed from old Ulf Fase to his younger and more dynamic cousin Birger Jarl. Moreover, Holmger Knutsson had come of age, and, being a son of former king Canute II of Sweden, had his own aspirations to the throne. When Ulf Fase died, Birger Jarl may have felt it was time to deal with Holmger and his allies in Uppland.

== Location ==
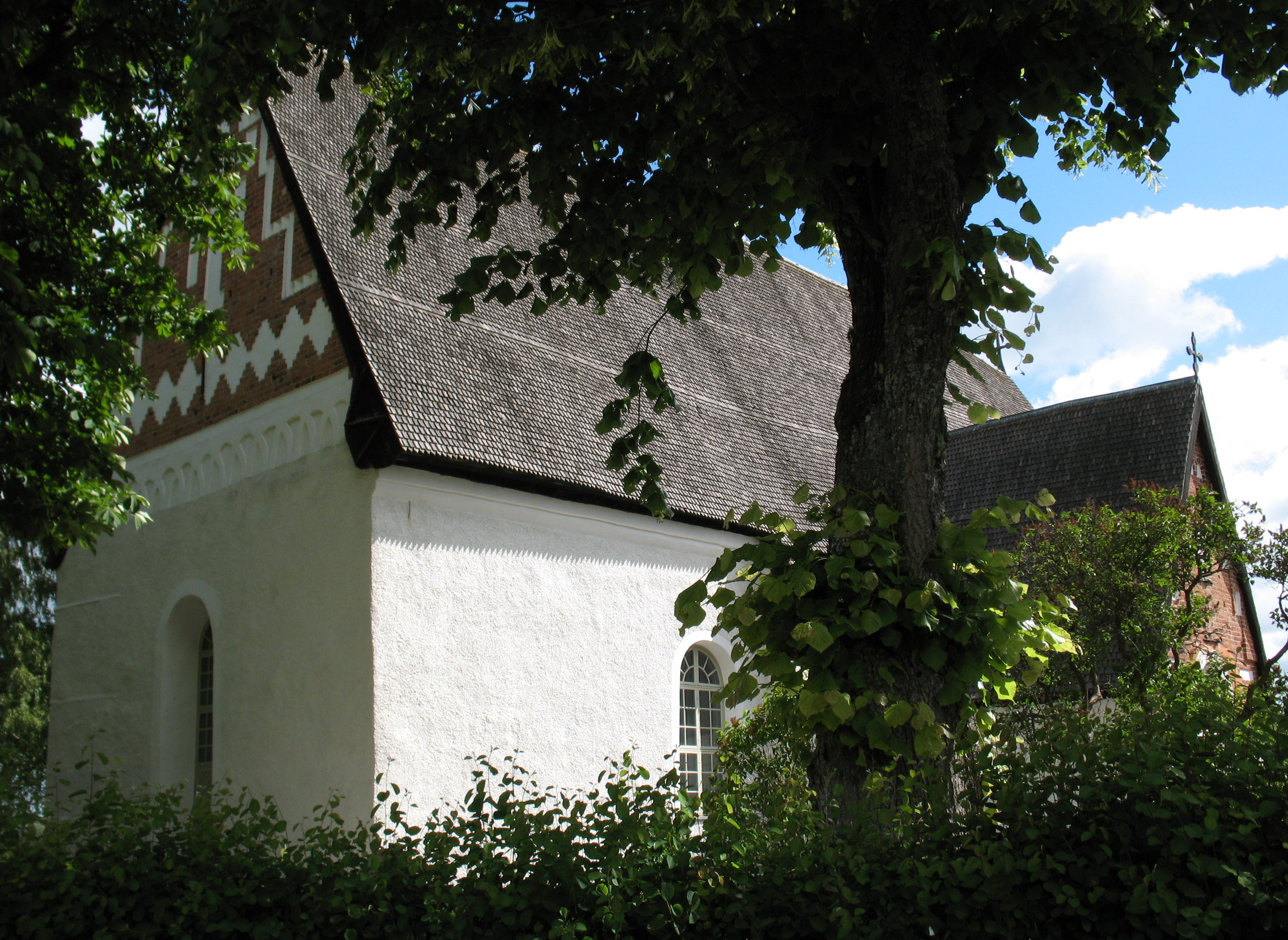
The church of Sparrsätra.

The battle took place at Sparrsätra, which is located in Uppland, north of Enköping. According to tradition it was fought on waterlogged meadows west of the church of Sparrsätra, but it has been suggested that the rebels had their encampment several kilometres eastwards in Rönne, where there are remains of potentially strategic fortifications.

== Battle ==
One view holds that this was the first battle where heavy cavalry was used in central Sweden, although such cavalry had appeared a century earlier at the Battle of Fotevik in Scania. The professional heavy cavalry fielded by King Eric defeated Holmger's army, which consisted of a public levy.

According to the 14th century Law of Södermanland a levied farmer was supposed to be equipped with sword, javelin, lance and helmet; however, it is known that these conscript armies consisted largely of people who had little more than an axe or a sword to fight with. In Snorri Sturluson's kings' sagas there are descriptions of battles where the combatants fought with stones.

== Aftermath ==
After the battle, Holmger fled north to Gästrikland, but he was soon arrested by the king and the jarl, who had him beheaded. The Eric's Chronicle tell that the king took part in the funeral and walked him to the grave, which suggests that the old Norse code of honouring dead enemies was still alive, although such traditions would later change. Among Upplanders who had lost their leader, Holmger rose to the status of unofficial saint, and only a few years after his execution people would tell of miracles in his name as far south as Denmark.

When the Papal legate William of Modena arrived in the same year, he stayed in the less turbulent district of Östergötland, where he met Birger Jarl. William reported home that he had offered to mediate in the conflict, and in March 1248, he reported that a peace agreement had been reached. This was at the time when the meeting at Skänninge took place, in which Sweden was formally integrated into the Catholic community.

The Swedes of Uppland, who since time immemorial had been divided into folklands according to how many warriors they could provide, had lost their warrior status, and they had become taxpayers like the king's other subjects. The new taxes described in the Annals of Sigtuna would also appear in the later law of Uppland, and the king used the taxes to buy the services of heavy cavalry that he could use against his own people.

It would be several decades before a new tax exempted warrior class appeared in Sweden, and by then, exemption would be a privilege only afforded to the select few who could provide a knight in full armour.

The outcome of the battle was notorious enough to be mentioned in both Icelandic and Danish chronicles, and elaborate legends would be told in Sweden until the 17th century. The Uppland Swedes had been transformed from a people that extorted tribute from other peoples, to one that paid taxes themselves.

== Sources ==
- Larsson, Mats G (2002). Götarnas riken : Upptäcktsfärder till Sveriges enande. Bokförlaget Atlantis AB ISBN 978-91-7486-641-4
- Lindström, Fredrik; Lindström, Henrik (2006). Svitjods undergång och Sveriges födelse (in Swedish). Albert Bonniers förlag. 978-91-0-010789-5.
- Nationalencyklopedin
