= Erik Knutsson =

King of Sweden from 1208 to 1216

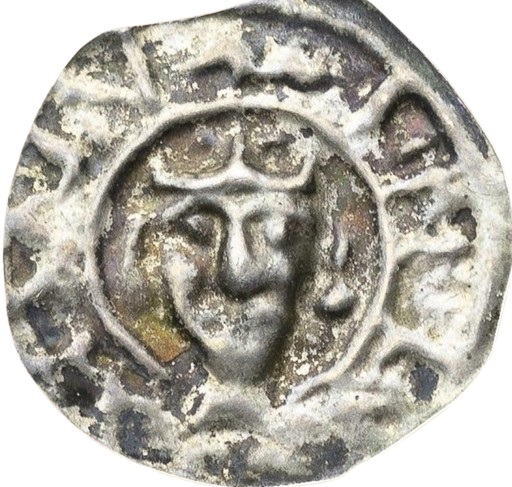
- Coin of King Erik c. 1210

King of Sweden
- Reign: 1208–1216
- Predecessor: Sverker Karlsson
- Successor: Johan Sverkersson
- Born: c. 1180
- Died: 10 April 1216 (aged 35–36); Näs Castle on the island of Visingsö
- Burial: Varnhem Abbey Church
- Spouse: Rikissa of Denmark
- Issue: Sophia Eriksdotter; Martha Eriksdotter; Ingeborg Eriksdotter; Marianna Eriksdotter; Erik Eriksson
- House: Erik
- Father: Knut Eriksson
- Mother: possibly Cecilia Johansdotter

Erik Knutsson (Old Norse: Eiríkr Knútsson; c. 1180 – 10 April 1216), sometimes known as Eric X, was King of Sweden between 1208 and 1216. Also known as Erik the Survivor (Swedish: Erik som överlevde), he was, at his accession to the throne, the only remaining son of King Knut Eriksson and his queen, whose name may have been Cecilia.

== Struggles for the throne ==
Nothing is known about his youth, but he may have been born around 1180 in Eriksberg royal manor. When Erik's father, King Knut, died peacefully in 1195 or 1196, his four sons were youthful but not children. One of them had been hailed as heir to the throne by the grandees of the kingdom when Knut was still alive. Whether this was Erik we do not know, nor do the sources disclose the names of his three brothers. In spite of the precautions of King Knut, his sons were passed over in favour of Sverker Karlsson, the head of the rival dynasty of the Sverkers. Perhaps this was due to the influence of the mighty second-of-the-realm, Jarl Birger Brosa. As far as we know the succession took place without bloodshed.

Knut Eriksson's sons continued to live in the Swedish royal court and were raised by King Sverker. Several years later, after the death of Birger Brosa, the brothers and their supporters brought forward claims to the throne. King Sverker did not acquiesce, at which point Erik and his brothers escaped to Norway where they stayed over the winter of 1204–05. Erik and his brothers had kin ties with the Norwegian Birkebeiner party since Jarl Håkon Galen was married to their cousin, and sought their support. In 1205, the brothers returned to Sweden with Norwegian backing. However, they were overcome by King Sverker in the Battle of Älgarås in Tiveden, where all three of Erik's brothers were killed. Erik survived and once again fled to Norway where he remained for three years.

In 1208 he returned to Sweden under unknown circumstances but apparently with Birkebeiner assistance. Sverker on his side received troops from King Valdemar Sejr of Denmark. In January 1208 Erik nevertheless defeated Sverker in the Battle of Lena and slew the Danish commander Ebbe Sunesen, whose troops suffered great losses. Popular tradition depicted the event as a battle between Sweden and Denmark where "two Danes ran for one Swede, and their backs were badly spanked by the Swedish men." A Danish folksong describes how "the horses of the lords return bloodied, and the saddles are empty".

== Consolidation of power ==
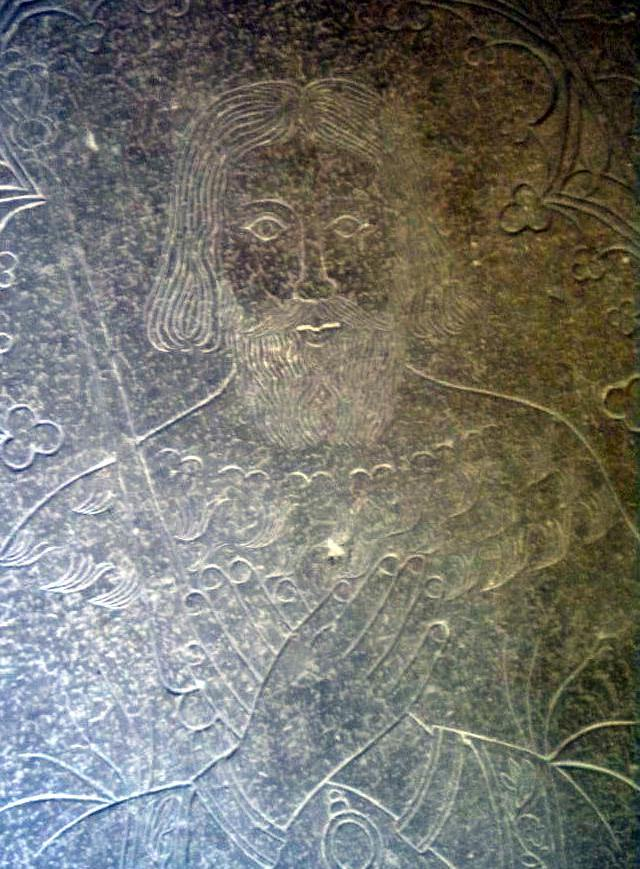
Image of king Erik from a 16th-century tombstone.

Now Erik took the name of King of Sweden. Birger Brosa's son Knut had been appointed jarl at some stage but appears to have died in the Battle of Lena. Erik appointed Folke Jarl, probably another son of Birger Brosa, in his stead. This person was the originator of the Folkung party which played a political role in 13th-century Sweden and is frequently confused with the royal family that reigned after 1250.

Sverker and the archbishop Valerius fled to Denmark after the defeat and applied for the intervention of Pope Innocent III. Innocent ordered the bishops of Skara, Linköping and a third see to persuade Erik to come to terms with Sverker and return the royal prerogatives. In case of refusal, Erik would be censured by the Church. This did not have the desired effect, and in 1210 Sverker invaded Sweden in an attempt to reconquer the throne. However, he was defeated in the Battle of Gestilren in July 1210. This time Sverker was killed at the hands of Folke Jarl and his party; however, Folke was also slain together with many Folkungs. The location of the battle has been a matter of debate (Varv in Västergötland, Göstring Hundred in Östergötland, Gästre in Uppland). The banner under which King Erik's troops fought, was preserved by his kinsman the lawspeaker Eskil Magnusson of the Bjälbo family in Skara, who in 1219 gave it as honorary to his visiting Icelandic colleague Snorre Sturlasson.

== Reign ==
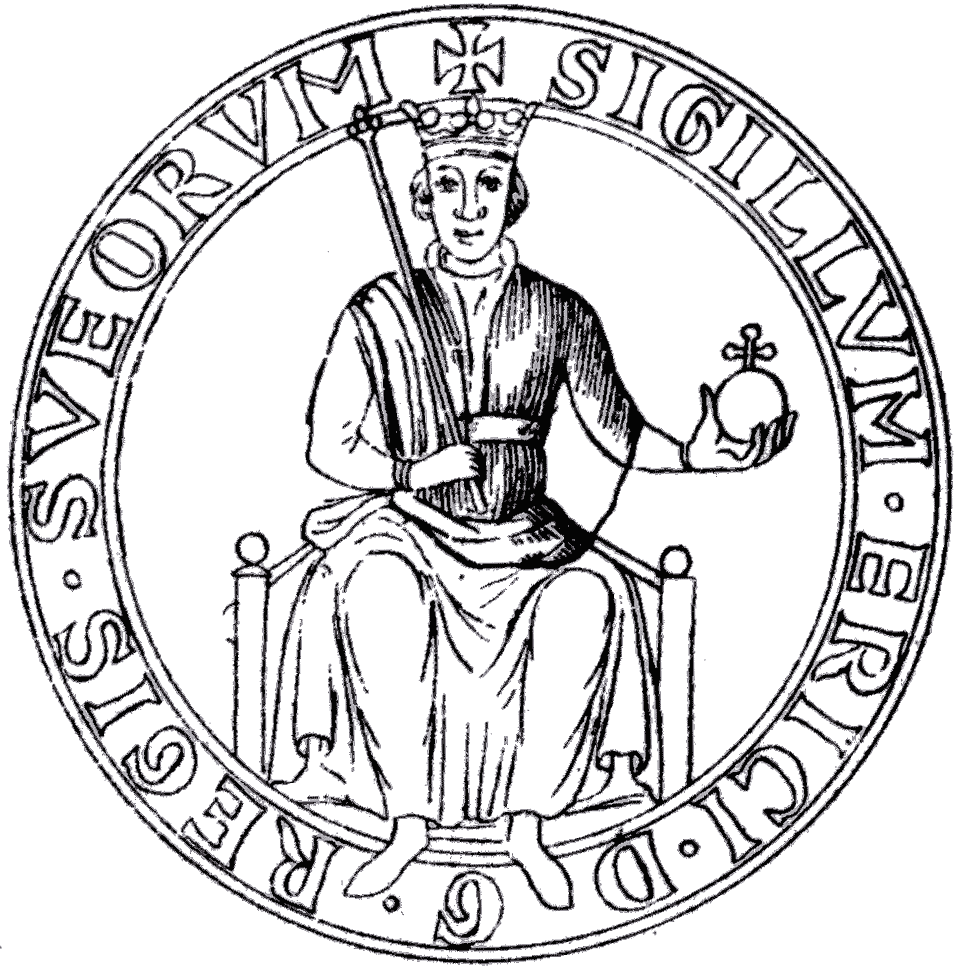
The seal of King Erik

The achievement of Erik Knutsson was remarkable: without support by the Church, he was able to foment a network of followers in short time and defeat troops from Denmark, the major Scandinavian power at the time. After his victory, King Erik nevertheless quickly reconciled with the Danish king as well as the Catholic Church. In the same year 1210 he married princess Rikissa, daughter of the late Valdemar I of Denmark, and sister of Valdemar Sejr. This was to make up relations with Denmark, which had traditionally supported the Sverker dynasty, against the Norwegian-supported dynasty of Erik. In November 1210 he was the first (known) Swedish king who was crowned, by his former enemy Archbishop Valerius.

Not much is known about Erik's reign; written documents are few and do not give much insight in affairs during his time. However, in 1216 Innocent III confirmed Erik in the rule, not only over his kingdom, but also over any pagan lands that he may conquer in the future. Thus King Erik entertained plans of military expansion to non-Christian areas across the Baltic Sea. For the rest, his reputation is good in Swedish historiography: the short chronicle incorporated in the Västgöta Law calls him a good årkonung (harvest king, king of good years).

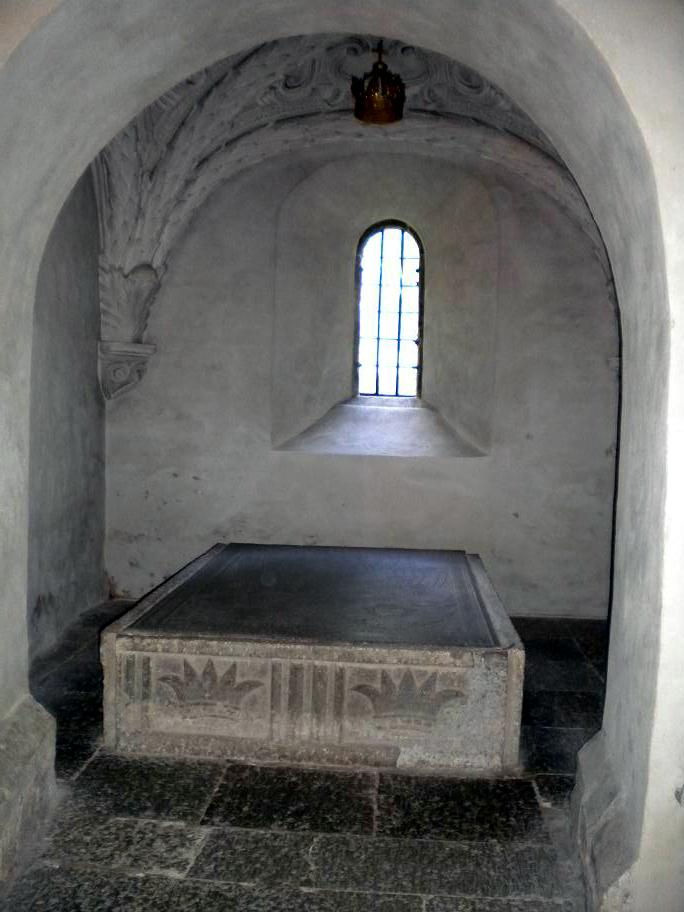
King Erik's tomb in Varnhem Abbey

Erik died suddenly of natural causes on 10 April 1216 in Näs Castle on the island of Visingsö. He was buried in the Varnhem Abbey. He did not leave a son at his demise, though Queen Rikissa gave birth to a boy named Erik shortly afterwards. Erik Knutsson's immediate successor was Johan I, a son of his rival Sverker Karlsson. After Johan died of illness in 1222, Erik's six-year-old son Erik was hailed as king.

== Issue ==
- Sophia Eriksdotter (died 1241), married Henry III of Rostock
- (allegedly) Martha Eriksdotter, who married the Marshal Nils Sixtensson (Sparre)
- Ingeborg Eriksdotter (died 1254), married to Birger Jarl, regent of Sweden
- (possibly) Marianna, who married Barnim I, Duke of Pomerania
- Erik Eriksson (1216–1250), King of Sweden in c. 1222–1229 and 1234–1250.

== Bibliography ==
- Axelson, Sven, Sverige i utländsk annalistik 900–1400 med särskild hänsyn till de isländska annalerna. Stockholm, 1955.
- Bolin, Sture, "Erik Knutsson", Svenskt biografiskt lexikon, https://sok.riksarkivet.se/Sbl/Presentation.aspx?id=15401
- Gillingstam, Hans, "Folkungaätten", Svenskt biografiskt lexikon, https://sok.riksarkivet.se/Sbl/Presentation.aspx?id=14301
- Gillingstam, Hans, "Knut Eriksson", Svenskt biografiskt lexikon, https://sok.riksarkivet.se/Sbl/Presentation.aspx?id=11661
- Gillingstam, Hans, "Utomnordiskt och nordiskt i de äldsta svenska dynastiska förbindelserna", Personhistorisk tidskrift, häfte 1, 1981. http://personhistoriskasamfundet.org/1971-1998/
- Harrison, Dick, Sveriges historia; medeltiden. Stockholm: Liber, 2002.
- Lönnroth, Erik, Från svensk medeltid. Stockholm: Aldus, 1959.
- Sandblom, Sven, Gestilren 1210. Striden stod i Uppland! I Gästre!. Enköping: Enköpings kommun, 2004.
- Wieselgren, P., Sveriges sköna litteratur: En öfverblick vid akademiska föreläsningar, Vol. II. Lund: Gleerup, 1834.
- Starbäck, Carl Georg; Bäckström, Per Olof (1885–1886). "Berättelser ur svenska historien" (in Swedish).

Erik Knutsson House of Erik Born: c. 1180 Died: 10 April 1216
Regnal titles
| Preceded by Sverker Karlsson | King of Sweden; 1208–1216 | Succeeded by Johan Sverkersson |
