= Näs Castle =

- Visingsö, Sweden
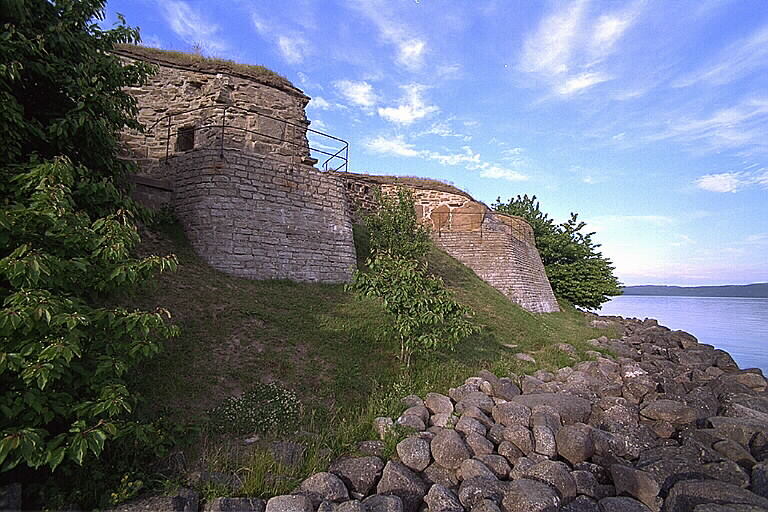
- Näs Castle ruins

Näs Castle (Swedish: Näs slottsruin) is the ruins of a former castle at Visingsö parish in Jönköping County, Sweden. The ruins are on the southern end of the island of Visingsö in the southern part of Lake Vättern.

== History ==
The facility was built as a royal residence during the 12th century. It was constructed during the reign of King Sverker I of Sweden (1132–1156) or his son King Karl Sverkersson (c. 1130–1167) who resided in Näs Castle and was assassinated on the island of Visingsö by supporters of his successor King Knut Eriksson. In 1318, the castle was pledged by King Birger Magnusson (1280–1321) to his brother-in-law King Eric VI of Denmark. The castle was burned down after fighting the same year while Birger was in exile.

== See also ==
- List of castles in Sweden
