= Holmger Knutsson =

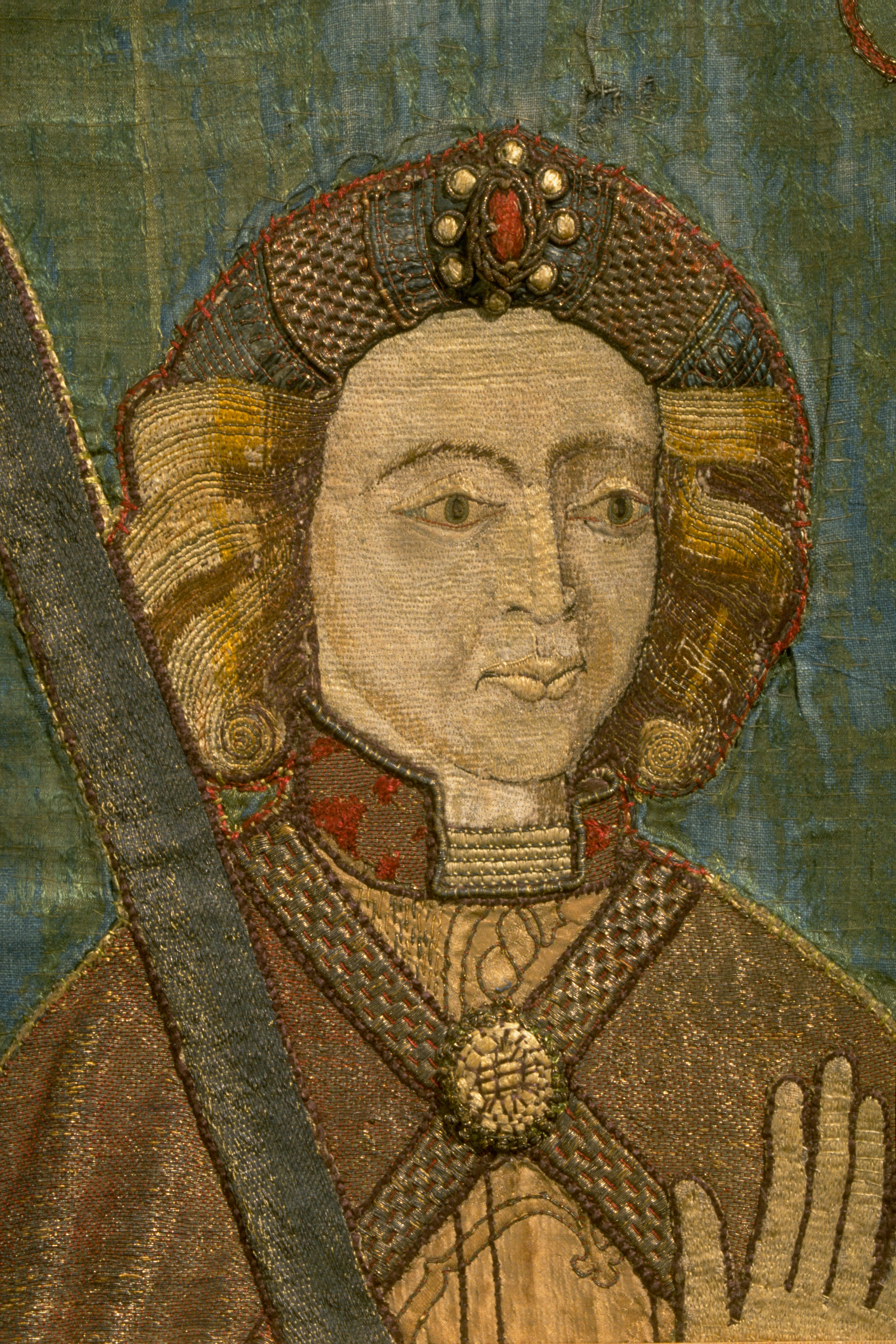
- Detail of Holmger Knutson's tomb cover from Skokloster Church, now in the Swedish Museum of National Antiquities.
- Born: 1210s
- Died: 1248
- Burial: Skokloster Church, Håbo, near Uppsala
- Spouse: Helena Filipsdotter
- Father: Knut Långe

Holmger Knutsson (1210s – 1248) was a Swedish nobleman and a claimant to the Swedish throne during the reign of King Erik Eriksson.

His tomb cover showed two Coats of Arms: one is known to have been used by his father, the other is that of the House of Bjälbo. It is could thus be considered likely that his mother came from that family, though it has also been claimed by Lagerqvist and others that she was Helena Pedersdatter Strange.

Holmger Knutsson was the eldest son of King Knut Långe (Knut Holmgersson) of Sweden. At his father's death in 1234, Holmger seems to have been on his way to be the new king, but he was side-tracked by Jarl Ulf Fase and earlier King Erik Eriksson who had been exiled in Denmark since 1229. Holmger's whereabouts after that are not known, but it has been speculated that he held Gästrikland north of Uppland for the next thirteen years.

Together with folkungs, Holmger made an unsuccessful attempt for the crown in 1247.

There seems to have been a widespread attempt to have Holmger established as a saint, but that was eventually suppressed. He lies buried next to his father in Skokloster (Sko Abbey) Church in Håbo, near Uppsala. Holmger was married to Helena Filipsdotter. They had no known children.

== Sources ==
- Adolfsson, Mats När borgarna brann - svenska uppror (Stockholm: Natur & Kultur, 2007)
- Gillingstam, Hans (1977). "Knut långe". Svenskt biografiskt lexikon (in Swedish).
- Harrison, Dick Jarlens sekel - en berättelse om 1200-talets Sverige (Ordfront, Stockholm: 2002) ISBN 91-7324-898-3
- Lagerqvist, Lars O. Sverige och dess regenter under 1000 år (Bonniers, Stockholm: 1982) ISBN 91-0-075007-7
- Larsson, Mats G. Götarnas riken : Upptäcktsfärder till Sveriges enande (Bokförlaget Atlantis AB. 2002) ISBN 978-91-7486-641-4
