= Erik Eriksson =

King of Sweden (r. 1222–1229; 1234–1250)

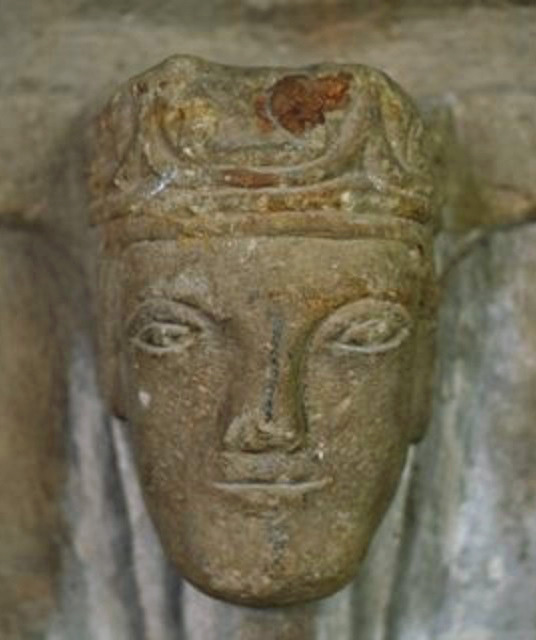
- Contemporary bust of King Erik

King of Sweden
- Reign: 1222–1229
- Predecessor: Johan Sverkersson
- Successor: Knut Långe
- Reign: 1234–1250
- Predecessor: Knut Långe
- Successor: Valdemar Birgersson
- Born: 1216
- Died: 2 February 1250 (aged 33–34); Sweden
- Spouse: Catherine Sunesdotter
- House: Erik
- Father: Erik Knutsson
- Mother: Rikissa of Denmark

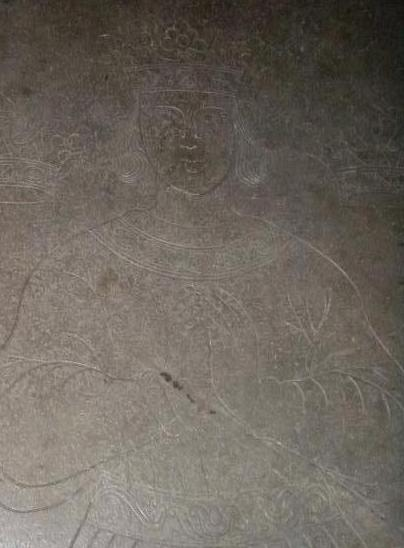
Erik on his gravestone in Varnhem Abbey.

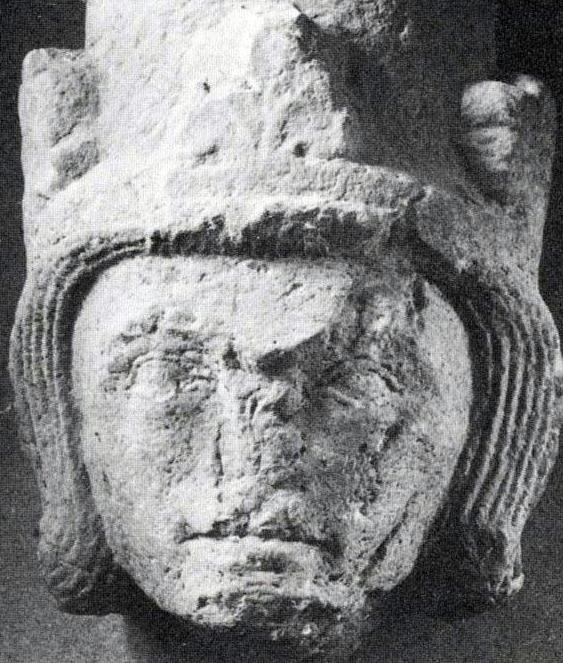
Damaged 13th century bust assumed to be of Erik

Erik Eriksson (Old Norse: Eiríkr Eiríksson; 1216 – 2 February 1250), sometimes known as Erik XI (Note: Referring to Erik Eriksson as Erik XI is a later invention, counting backwards from Erik XIV (1560–68). He and his brother Charles IX (1604–1611) adopted numerals according to a fictitious history of Sweden. The number of Swedish monarchs named Erik before Erik XIV (at least seven) is unknown, going back into prehistory, and none of them used numerals.) or with the epithet the Lisp and Lame (läspe och halte), was King of Sweden from 1222 to 1229 and again from 1234 to 1250. Being the last ruler of the House of Erik, he stood in the shadow of a succession of powerful jarls, especially his brother-in-law Birger Jarl, whose descendants ruled as kings after his death.

== Background ==
Erik was the son of King Erik Knutsson and Rikissa of Denmark. According to Erik's Chronicle (Erikskrönikan), written in the early 1320s, Erik is said to have been partly lame; "King Erik lisped somewhat when talking / and displayed a limp when walking". For this reason, later historians referred to him as "Erik the Lisp and Lame" which was apparently not used in his own time. Erik was born after his father had already died (1216). The fifteen-year-old Johan Sverkersson from the rival House of Sverker was hailed king by the Swedish aristocracy, while Queen Rikissa returned to her Danish homeland where her brother Valdemar Sejr ruled.

Erik spent his early youth in Denmark, while Valdemar championed his rights to the Swedish throne and tried to prevent the coronation of Johan. Pope Honorius III ordered three North German bishops to investigate the issue in 1219, however to no avail. Johan nevertheless died in 1222, whereby the House of Sverker became extinct in the male line.

== First reign ==
With no dynastic rivals at hand, the six-year-old Erik was hailed as king, sometime between August 1222 and July 1223. Archbishop Olof Basatömer supported his cause and appears to have crowned him in Strängnäs Cathedral on 31 July 1223. During the minority of the king, a council was formed, consisting of Bishop Bengt of Skara, the king's foster father Erengisle Vig, Stenar, Knut Kristinesson, and Knut Långe (Knut Holmgersson). The two last-mentioned were second cousins of King Erik. In 1225, Erik and his realm were taken under the protection of the Pope. In the same year a brief conflict with Norway flared up, as King Håkon Håkonson made an incursion into Värmland in retaliation for support given to Håkon's Norwegian enemies. The members of the royal council were termed consiliarii (Swedish: rådsherre), a term that now occurs for the first time in a Swedish context. However, the internal cohesion of the council was weak, and its members were considered notoriously unreliable. Knut Kristinesson went to Norway in 1226 in order to claim the crown of this country, and Bishop Bengt died in 1228.

In 1229, a feud broke out, as Knut the Tall and a party of nobles, the Folkung Party, rose against the young ruler. The causes are not known, but a wish by some nobles to restrain the power of the Church might have had a role. Erik was overthrown after the Battle of Olustra in 1230. The battle is believed to have taken place in Olustra (Ostra) in Södermanland, although Alvastra in Östergötland has been mentioned as a possible site. After his loss, the young king fled to Denmark where his uncle Valdemar Sejr was still ruling. Knut Långe was crowned King of Sweden in 1231, but his time was short and he died in 1234, which prompted Erik to return to the throne.

== Second reign ==
According to a Danish source, Erik returned to Sweden already in 1232, when Knut was still king. The Swedish Erikskrönikan on the contrary asserts that he came back after King Knut's death, after a new round of fighting; however, this is not recorded in any other source. At any rate Erik was once again accepted as king and ruled until his own death in 1250. At first, he reconciled with the Folkung Party. The Folkung Ulf Fase, who had been Jarl of the realm under Knut Långe, continued to serve in that function under Erik. Ulf Fase was an able politician who managed to prevent feuding between the noble factions for many years. As a king, Erik is depicted in Erikskrönikan as good-natured but physically passive:

He readily supported what was right and reasonable, and loved his own kindred. He was a hospitable host and gave the peasantry good peace. He understood serious matters well, but could not take part much in tournaments.

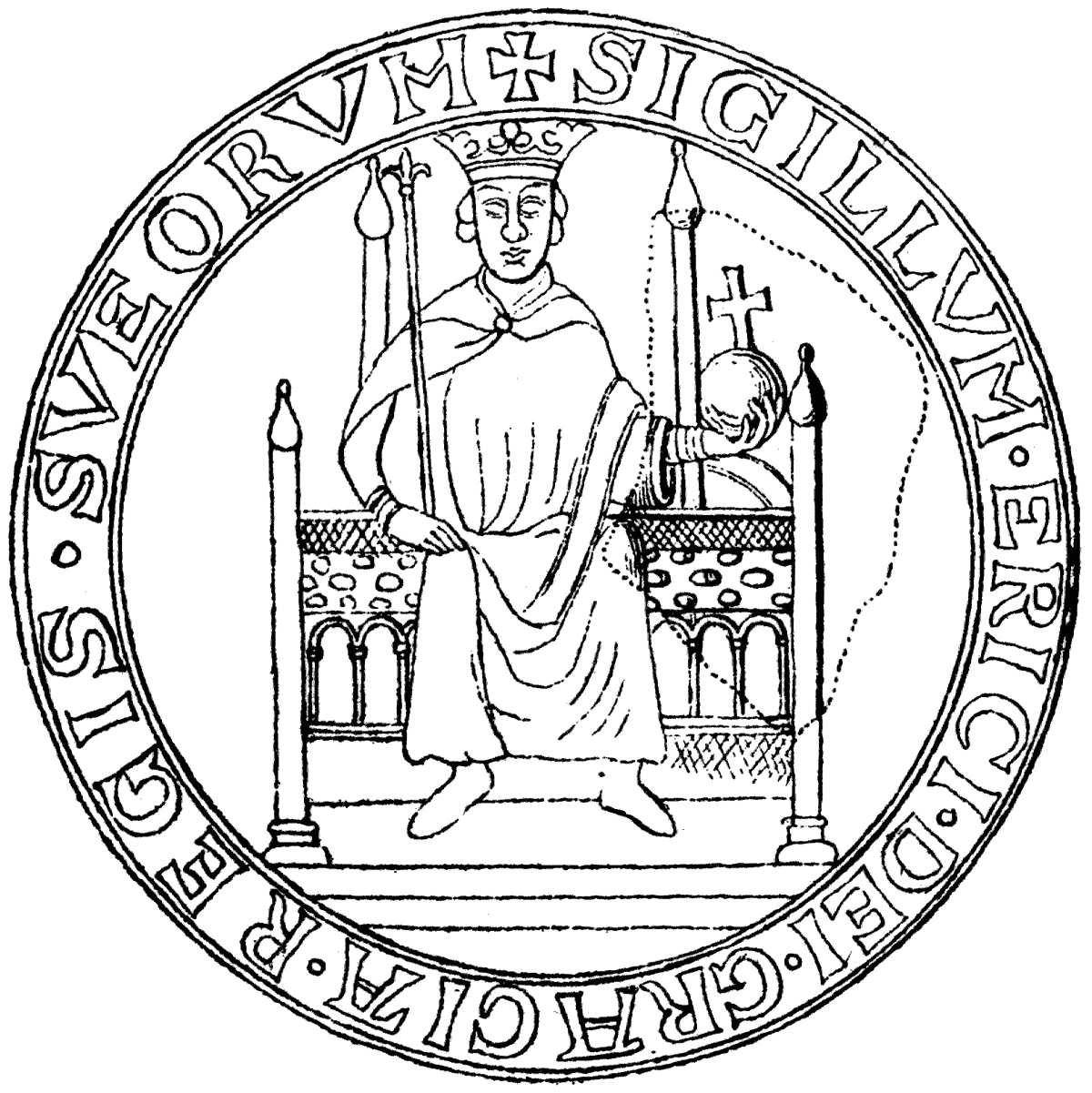
17th-century drawing of King Erik's seal

In fact, he was relatively insignificant and heavily dependent on stronger men in his entourage; first Ulf Fase and, after his death (1248), the latter's kinsman Birger Magnusson (better known as Birger Jarl; d. 1266). They were both scions of the large and influential Bjälbo family from Östergötland, but entertained different political agendas. While Ulf pursued a policy of alliance with the Norwegian king, Birger strove to strengthen royal authority by allying closely with the Catholic Church. In about the late 1230s, King Erik's elder sister Ingeborg was married to Birger, in the latter's first marriage. Birger was purportedly the son of a female heiress of the Sverker dynasty, thus having royal blood. It is possible that multiple jarls co-existed during his reign, as Birger Jarl is referred to as dux in 1247; however, whether this is a mistake, or if Ulf governed Svealand while Birger governed Östergötland, is not known.

== Eastward expansion ==
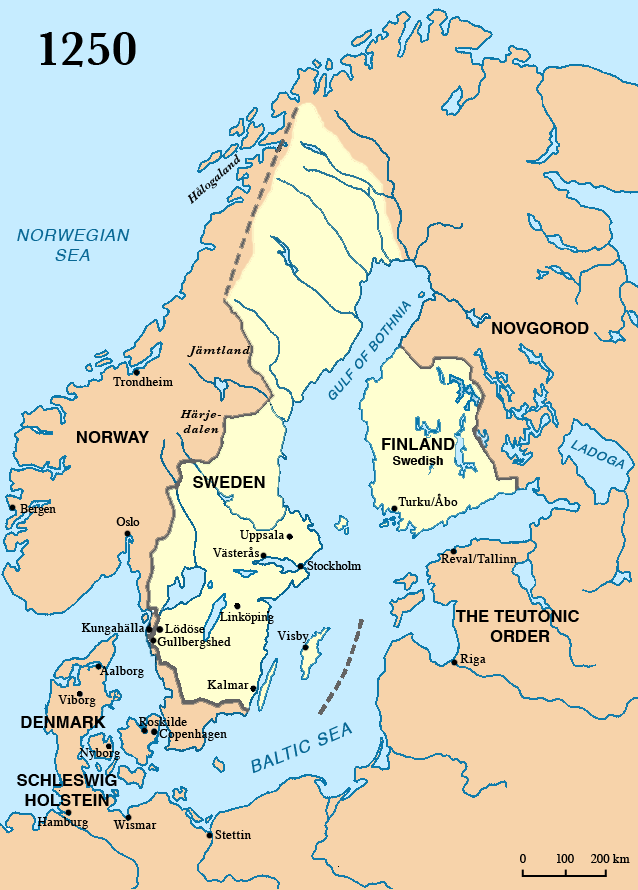
The rough extent of Swedish rule at Erik's death.

Sweden had a certain presence in southwest Finland by the early 13th century, although it is unclear to what extent this translated into political power. A bishopric existed in Nousiainen and later Turku (Swedish: Åbo), which stood under the papal legate of the Baltic region. The Erikskrönikan contains a graphic description of a military expedition to Tavastia (Finnish: Häme) further to the east that King Erik dispatched in an unspecified year, possibly in 1238–39 or 1249–50. The professed aim was to Christianize the pagan lands. A sizable fleet was assembled under the leadership of Birger and sailed over to Tavastia (a problematic statement since Tavastia is an inland region). According to the highly propagandist chronicle, the expedition was an unqualified success:

They took their banners and went ashore. The Christians fared well there; they let their shields and their helmets shine throughout the country. They were eager to try their swords on the heathen Tavasts, as I expect they did. The Tavasts then ran away with gold and silver and large herds. The heathen lost, the Christians won. Whoever was willing to do as they wished and become Christian and be baptised, they allowed him to keep his property and his life, and peace to live without any strife or trouble. Any heathen who did not want this, they killed.

The expedition led to the establishment of a permanent fortress, Tavasteborg, and the formal Christianization of the region. As the chronicle has it, "I think the Russian king feels its loss". The enterprise is not mentioned in other sources, and its circumstances are hotly debated among modern historians. It is possibly connected to a Swedish foray in the Novgorod Republic in 1240. A fleet of ships commanded by a certain Spiridon and accompanied by a few bishops went up the Neva River, but were attacked and routed by the Novgorodian prince Alexander Nevsky. Details of the battle are partly legendary, and its significance might have been exaggerated in Russian historiography. According to a 14th-century source, the Swedish leader was a Belgerd, corresponding to Birger, though this may be a later construction.

== Renewed domestic feuding ==
Internal fighting once again broke out in 1247, shortly before (or possibly after) Ulf Fase's death. The Folkung Party warred with King Erik and Birger, but their peasant allies in Uppland lost the Battle of Sparrsätra and were punished by tightening royal taxation. The Folkung leader Holmger Knutsson, a son of Knut Långe, fled to Gästrikland but was captured by Erik's men and beheaded.

Shortly after the defeat of the uprising, Birger was appointed Jarl of the realm. As such he oversaw a clerical meeting in Skänninge in February 1248, summoned by the papal legate William of Sabina. On behalf of Pope Innocent IV, he urged the Swedes to stick to canonic-juridical praxis as laid down by Rome. The authority of the bishops was strengthened and Sweden was increasingly incorporated in the Catholic Church.

== Family and heirs ==
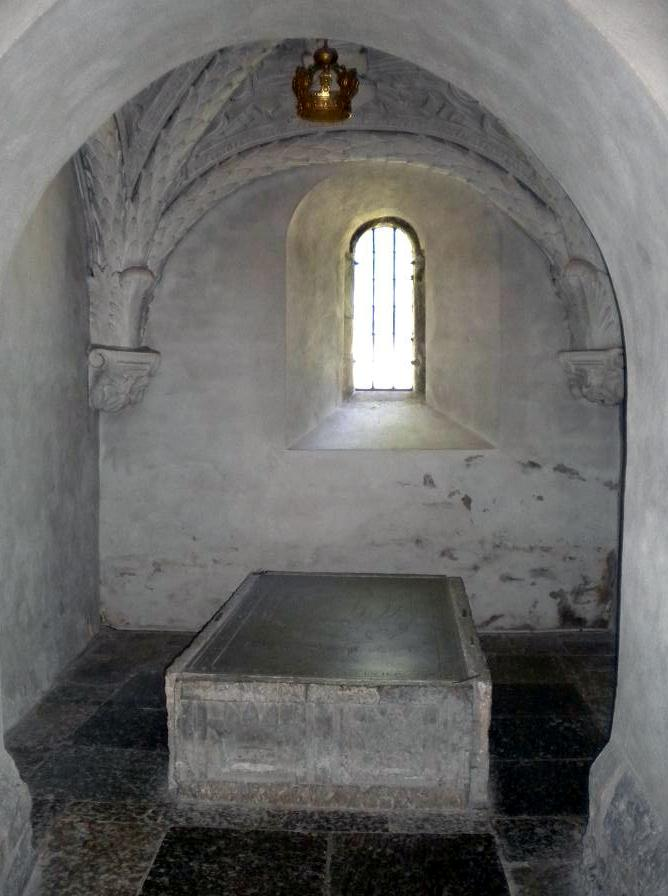
King Erik's tomb in Varnhem Abbey

Erik married Queen Catherine in 1243 or 1244. She was the daughter of Jarl Sune Folkesson of Bjälbo and an heiress of the House of Sverker. In that way the two long-competing royal houses were eventually united. Commonly, it is believed that Erik was childless since he was inherited by his sister, Birger Jarl's wife, but some sources suggest that he fathered Ingeborg, "filia regis Sueciae" who was married to John I of Saxe-Lauenburg. A later genealogy from the 16th century calls her "filia Erici Regis Suecorum". However, Ingeborg may actually have been a daughter of Birger Jarl.

Erik Eriksson died on 2 February 1250, and was buried in the monastery of Varnhem Abbey in Västergötland. With him the House of Erik became extinct in the male line, with the possible exception of Knut Långe's son Filip (d. 1251). (Note: Filip and his father Knut Långe were probably descendants of Saint Erik, although the details are not quite certain; Line, Kingship and State Formation in Sweden, p. 568.) Under these circumstances the throne went to the offspring of Birger Jarl and Ingeborg, the more since Birger was now in full control over the realm. Their eldest but still under-age son Valdemar was elected king in 1250 to succeed Erik, possibly by-passing the sons, to the extent there were such, of Ingeborg's elder sisters. (Note: Ingeborg had at least one, possibly more sisters, though their birth dates or birth order are not known. The sons of her documented sister Sophia (d. 1241) were dukes in Mecklenburg but made no known claims.) Birger Jarl became the Regent, holding the true power in Sweden until his own death in 1266. Skáldatal reports that Óláfr Þórðarson was one of Erik's court skalds.

== Sources ==
- Larrea, Beñat Elortza (13 March 2023). Polity Consolidation and Military Transformation in Medieval Scandinavia: A European Perspective, c.1035–1320. BRILL. p. 340. ISBN 978-90-04-54349-2.
- Line, Philip (2007). Kingship and State Formation in Sweden: 1130 - 1290. BRILL. ISBN 978-90-04-15578-7.

Erik Eriksson the lisp and the lame House of Erik Born: 1216 Died: 2 February 1250
Regnal titles
Preceded by Johan Sverkersson	King of Sweden; 1222–1229	Succeeded by Knut Långe
Preceded by Knut Långe	King of Sweden; 1234–1250	Succeeded by Valdemar
