= Knut Långe =

King of Sweden from 1229 to 1234

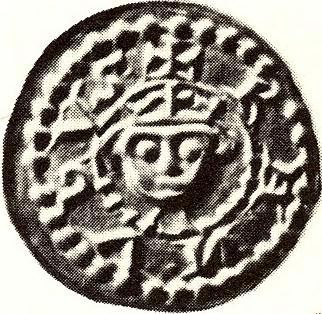
- Coin bearing the effigy of Knut Långe

King of Sweden
- Reign: 1229 – 1234
- Predecessor: Erik Eriksson
- Successor: Erik Eriksson
- Died: 1234
- Issue: Holmger Knutsson; Philip Knutsson
Names
- Swedish: Knut Långe till Sko; Knut Holmgersson
- Father: Holmger

Knut Långe ("the Tall"), also known as Canute II, was King of Sweden from 1229 until his death in 1234. He was the father of Holmger Knutsson, a later pretender for the Swedish throne. Both father and son were members of the House of Bjälbo. He is often identified with Knut Holmgersson, a relative of King Erik Eriksson.

== Family ==
Not much is certain about his background. An unreliable, late fourteenth century source calls him "Knut Joansson", but the dominating theory is that he was identical with "Knut Holmgersson" who was a member of King Erik Eriksson's council and was a relative to the king, and that his father was the man Holmger who was called a "nepos" of King Knut Eriksson. This theory is supported by the fact that one of Knut's sons was named Holmger. Nepos usually meant nephew, but could be used for other younger relatives. If these identifications are correct, Knut would be the great-grandson of Saint Erik. A few historians have instead suggested that the late source might be correct and that Knut's father was Jon Jarl.

Some sources give Knut's spouse as Danish noble woman Helena Pedersdatter Strange ( c. 1200–1255). However this theory has been challenged by Hans Gillingstam (1925–2016), who instead believed that he was married to an unknown woman from the House of Bjälbo, evidenced by the coat of arms on the tomb cover of his son Holmger. Knut had the sons Holmger Knutsson (d. 1248) and Philip Knutsson (d. 1251), who both died in Folkung uprisings against Birger Jarl.

== Biography ==
In 1220, Knut donated land to two Dominican friars at Sko in Uppland. They left after a while, and the land instead formed the nucleus of the Sko Abbey for Cistercian nuns. According to a 16th-century source, he was eventually buried there.

Knut Långe was probably a member of the council that ruled Sweden from 1222 to 1229, during the minority of King Erik Eriksson. In 1229 or 1230, Erik was overthrown after the Battle of Olustra in Södermanland. Knut's exact involvement in the rising is unclear: he might have participated, or been a compromise candidate. He was recognized in 1231 at the latest, but his time in office was short. The sources contradict each other on the matter of Erik's return: the Lund annals claim that Erik returned before the death of Knut in 1232, Erik's Chronicle claims that he returned following the death of Knut and after renewed fighting. A note by the Icelandic saga writer Sturla Þórðarson claims that Knut was co-regent with King Erik Knutsson, with Ulf Fase continuing to serve as jarl after Knut's death. the reference to Erik Knutsson is clearly incorrect. Despite this error, the note, when considered alongside other sources, has been interpreted as a possible indication that Knut was co-regent with Erik Eriksson during part of his reign.

Knut's reign likely saw the revision of some Swedish laws: creditors could no longer enter the homes of debtors to collect debts without the assistance of a government official, and the king was required to hold judicial reviews at least every third year. These changes have been noted as having taken place in the reign of a "King Knut", and due to chronological considerations, Knut Långe is thought to be most likely.

== Bibliography ==
- Adolfsson, Mats När borgarna brann - svenska uppror (Stockholm: Natur & Kultur, 2007)
- Larsson, Mats G. Götarnas riken : upptäcktsfärder ill Sveriges enande (Bokförlaget Atlantis AB. 2002) ISBN 978-91-7486-641-4

Knut Långe House of Erik Died: 1234
Regnal titles
| Preceded by Erik Eriksson | King of Sweden; 1229–1234 | Succeeded by Erik Eriksson |
