= Folkung =

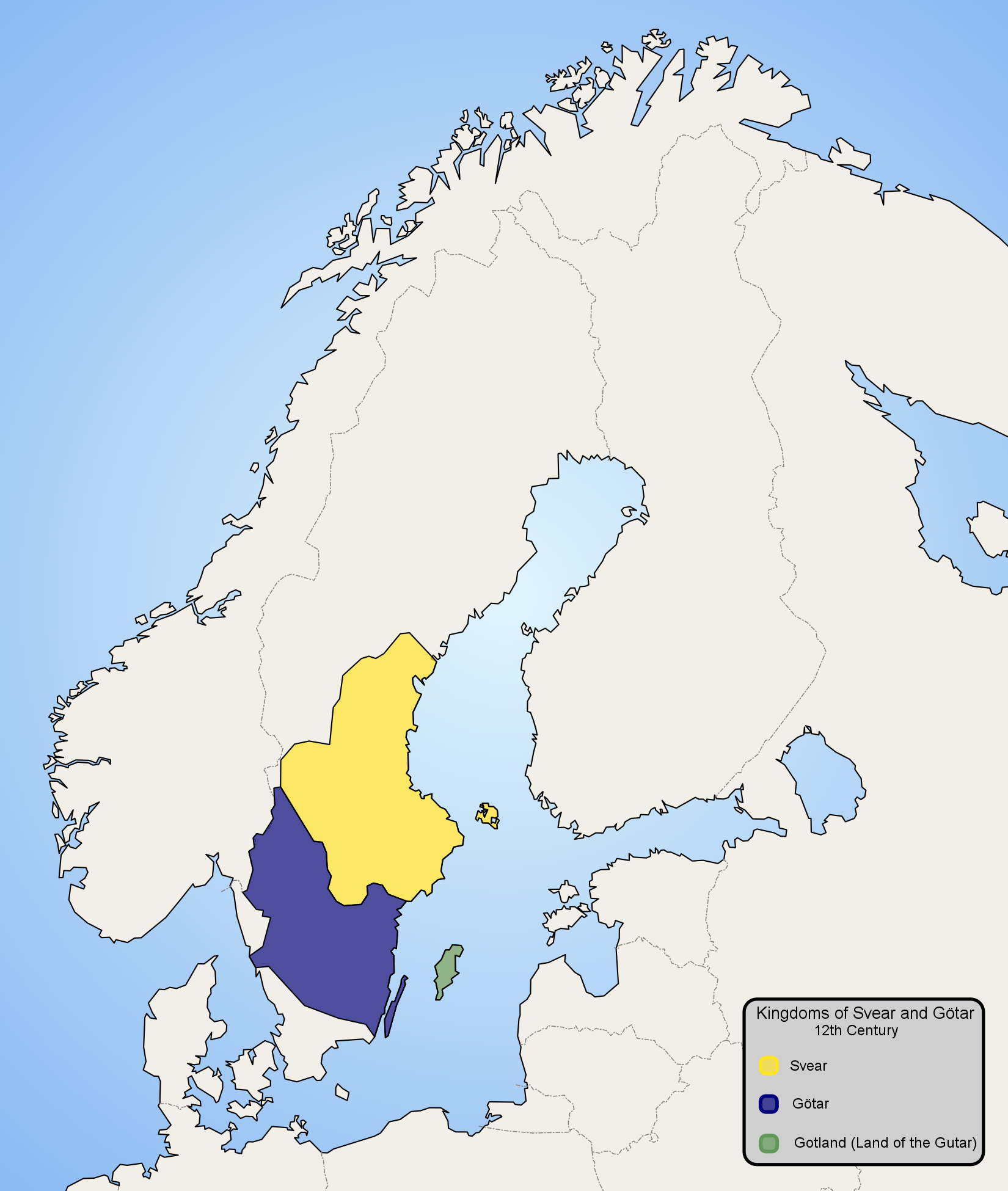
Approximate borders of Sweden in the 12th century before the incorporation of Finland during the 13th century. Blue and yellow represents the Geats (from Götaland) and Suiones (from Svealand) tribes; their previous unification marks the consolidation of Sweden (in one commonly held view).

In modern Swedish, Folkung has two meanings, which appear to be opposites:

1. The medieval "House of Bjälbo" in Sweden, which produced several Swedish statesmen and kings.
2. A group of people (singular Folkunge, plural Folkungar), who were at times in political opposition to the same House of Bjälbo. This "political party" fought for the ancient right of free men to elect the kings in Sweden.

Until the 17th century, Folkunge was used only with the second meaning. However, many of these political opponents were also said to have been descendants of Jarl Folke the Fat (from the House of Bjälbo), who lived before the family became royal. Hence, in the 17th century, the whole family, then already extinct and without any established name, became known as the House of Folkung (Folkungaätten in Swedish).

Later research, though, showed that the political Folkungs were not just descendants of Jarl Folke—instead, they belonged to different Swedish noble families, united by the ambition to fight against a central ruler of Sweden. According to one theory, Folkungs wanted to keep the old "freedom" of the petty kingdoms, including the election of kings, and to retain local power in their own control. Many Folkungs came from the ancient provinces of Svealand, opposing the ruling families of the time that were mostly from Götaland. The first Folkung uprising in 1229 was successful, elevating Canute II onto the throne. Later developments were less promising, and the centralized system eventually suppressed their resistance.

== See also ==
- Battle of Sparrsätra
- Second Folkung Uprising
- Third Folkung Uprising
- Consolidation of Sweden

== Bibliography ==
- Kari, Risto (2004), Suomalaisten keskiaika, WSOY, ISBN 951-0-28321-5
